= Church of the Assumption (Phoenix, Michigan) =

Historic church in Michigan, United States

- U.S. National Register of Historic Places
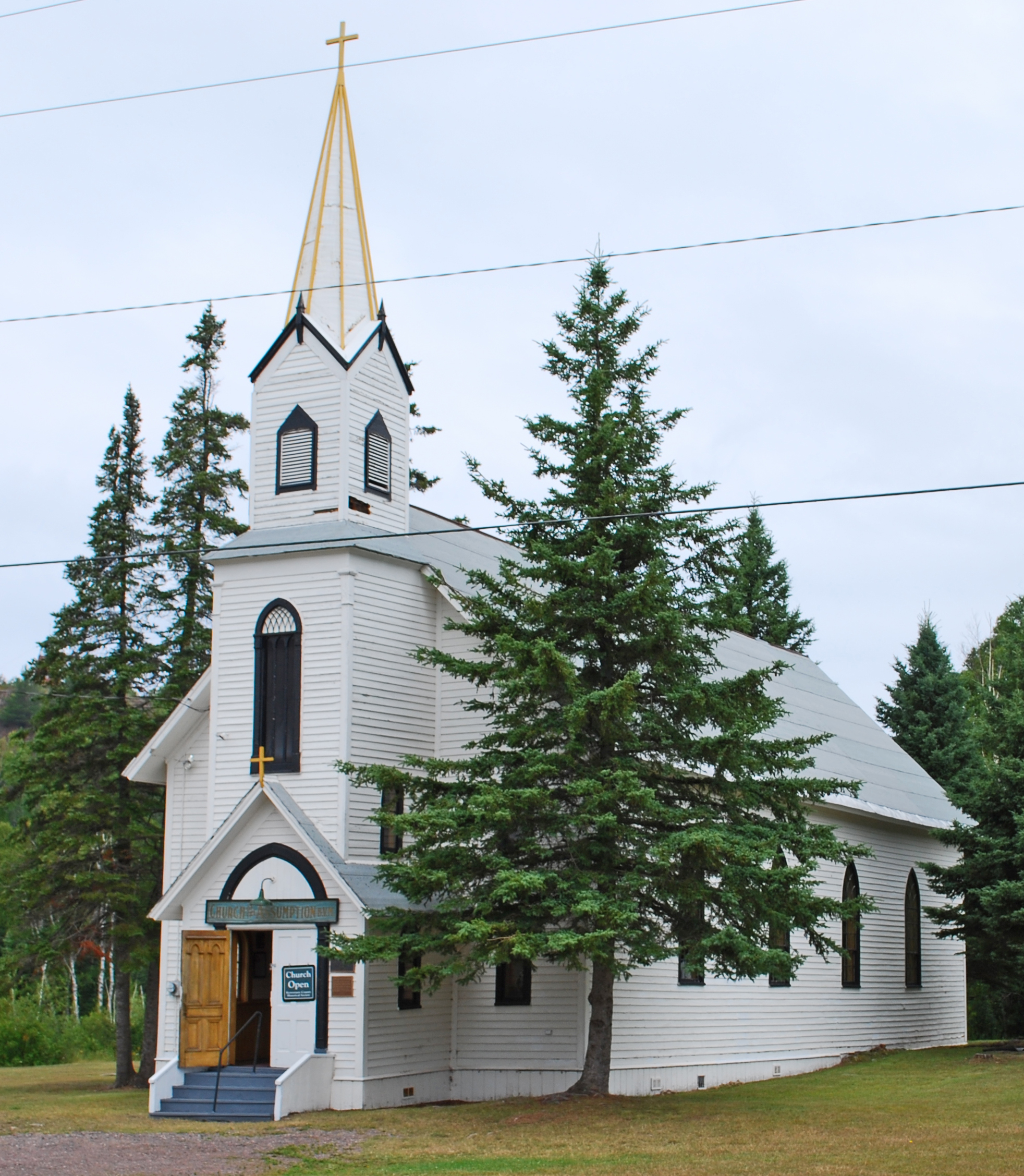

- Location within Michigan Location within the United States
- Interactive map
- Location: US 41, E of M-26, Houghton Township, Michigan
- Coordinates: 47°23′22″N 88°16′34″W
- Built: 1858
- Built by: Nicholas Grasser
- Architect: Frederic Baraga
- Architectural style: Carpenter Gothic
- NRHP reference No.: 00000220
- Added to NRHP: March 15, 2000

The Church of the Assumption is an historic Carpenter Gothic style Roman Catholic church located on US 41, 400 feet east of M-26 in Phoenix in Houghton Township, Michigan. It is also known as the Phoenix Church. The church was listed on the National Register of Historic Places in 2000.

== History ==
In 1853, Frederic Baraga was consecrated as bishop of the Upper Peninsula diocese, and in 1854 he sent Rev. Henry L. Thiele to serve at the Eagle River mission, which included the town of Clifton at the Cliff mine. In 1858, Bishop Baraga authorized Thiele to construct a church near Clifton. A site for a church and cemetery was donated by the North American Mining Company, and Thiel hired Nicholas Grasser to build the church for $1860. It is likely that Bishop Baraga himself designed the church. Construction began in 1868, and was completed in 1869.

The church was consecrated as St. Mary's, but by 1883, the name was changed to the Church of the Assumption. The church was served from the mission at Eagle Harbor. In 1884, the Cliff Mine closed down and the population of Clifton dropped to almost nothing in a few years time. The nearby Phoenix Mine suffered the same fate, and with almost no parishioners left, the Church of the Assumption was closed. However, in 1899 the Phoenix Consolidated Copper Company made plans to reopen the Phoenix Mine, and the church was dismantled and reconstructed in its present location in Phoenix. During reconstruction, the architecture of the church was changed to give it a more Gothic appearance, installing Gothic windows, changing the roof pitch, and reconstructing the belfry and spire.

The Phoenix Mine closed again by 1905, and the population of Phoenix again subsided. However, masses were held in the church until 1957, after which the church was finally closed. In 1985, the church was purchased by the Keweenaw County Historical Society, which undertook an extensive restoration process. As of 2009, the church (although deconsecrated) is still used for weddings and memorial services.

== Description ==
The Church of the Assumption is a white-painted wooden building in what was once the mining town of Phoenix. The church is covered in clapboard, and stands on concrete block piers which replaced the original supporting posts made of mine timbers. The building consists of a gable-roof nave about sixty feet by twenty-four feet, with a centrally positioned entryway/tower and steeple in the front facade and a small rear addition. The roof is steeply pitched, and the double-door entry has a pointed top arch. Four tall Gothic windows line each side of the nave's, and short upper and lower windows flank the entry tower, with additional windows in the tower's side walls. Another window in the front face of the tower above the entry.

Inside there is a small vestibule in the base of the tower, which leads into the nave. The long narrow room has wooden floor boards and wood-sheathed walls. A gallery is above, and a central aisle leads toward the altar. A rectangular-plan Gothic wooden altar stands on a platform in the front, with tiers of candle shelves behind. A door in the center of the rear wall behind the altar leads to a small one-story hip-roof sacristy.
