= Lake Shore Drive Bridge (Michigan) =

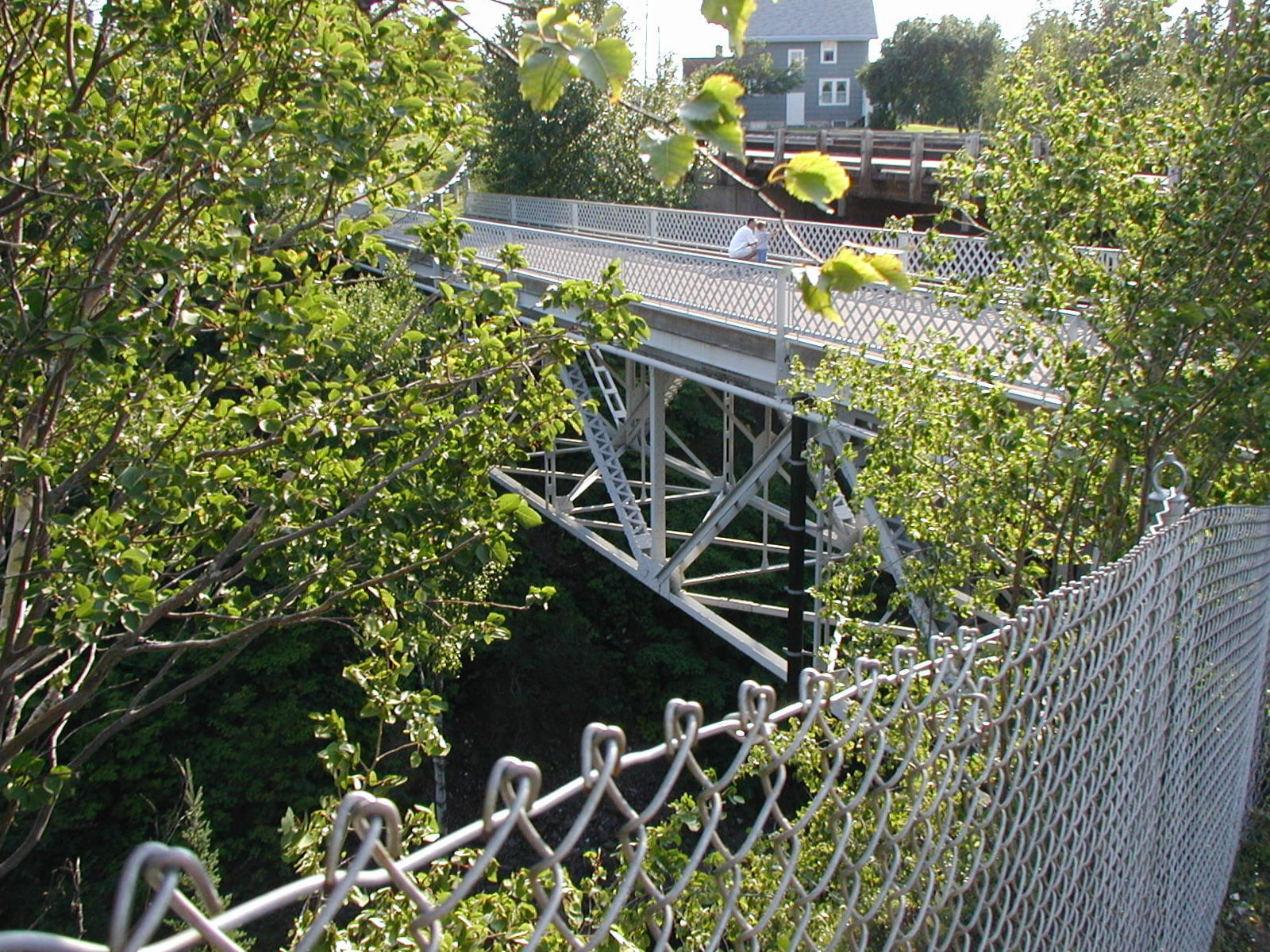
- Coordinates: 47.4125°N 88.2967°W
- Carries: Pedestrians
- Crosses: Eagle River
- Locale: Eagle River, Michigan
- Other name(s): M-26 Bridge; Eagle River Bridge
- Heritage status: Michigan State Historic Site; Designated: May 10, 1990
- ID number: 42142021000B030
- Followed by: Eagle River Timber Bridge

Characteristics
- Material: Steel
- Total length: 139 feet (42 m)
- Width: 18 feet (5.5 m)
- Longest span: 105 feet (32 m)
- No. of spans: 3

History
- Designer: Michigan State Highway Department
- Constructed by: Wisconsin Bridge and Iron Company
- Construction end: 1915

The Lake Shore Drive Bridge, also known as the M-26 Bridge or the Eagle River Bridge, is a pedestrian bridge in Eagle River, Michigan, crossing the Eagle River. It carried highway M-26 over the river from 1915 until 1990, when the adjacent Eagle River Timber Bridge replaced it for automobile traffic. The Lake Shore Drive Bridge is listed as a Michigan State Historic Site and is a contributing property of the Eagle River Historic District.

== History ==
=== Construction ===
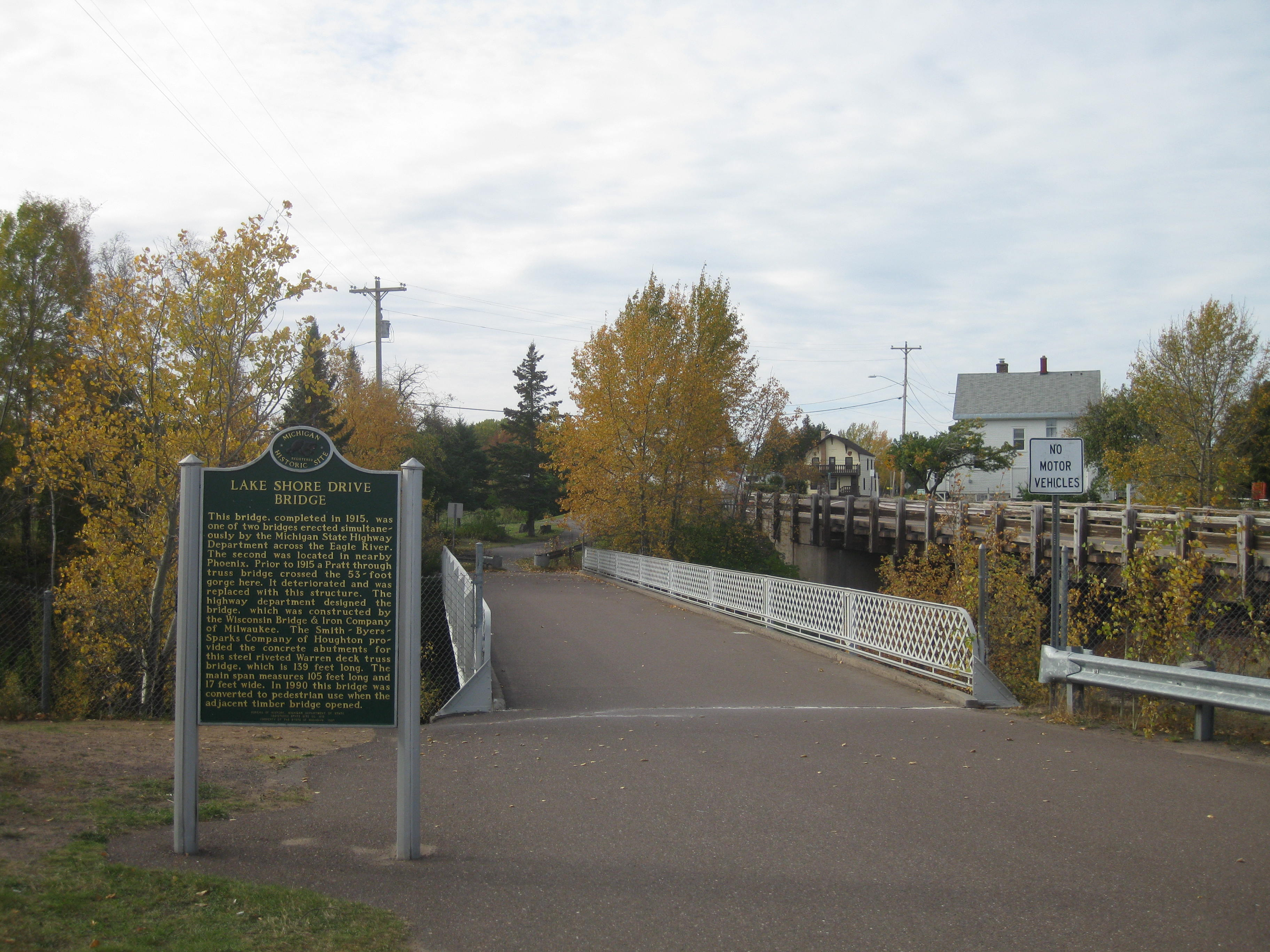
Looking along the length of the bridge

Originally located on the site was a Pratt through truss bridge, which by 1915 had deteriorated sufficiently to warrant replacement. The new bridge was designed by the Michigan State Highway Department under a system of standardized bridge plans provided to local communities on request. The Lake Shore Drive Bridge was constructed by the Wisconsin Bridge and Iron Company of Milwaukee and was completed in 1915. The concrete abutments were made by the Smith-Byers-Sparks Company from Houghton, Michigan. The Lake Shore Drive Bridge was one of two bridges built simultaneously over the Eagle River, the other located in Phoenix, Michigan.

The bridge is a contributing property of the Eagle River Historic District, listed on the National Register of Historic Places on September 13, 1984.

=== Replacement ===
In 1990, the adjacent Eagle River Timber Bridge opened for traffic and the Lake Shore Drive Bridge was relegated to pedestrian traffic. The Lake Shore Drive Bridge was listed as a Michigan State Historic Site on May 10, 1990, and an informational marker was erected in 1991.

=== 2007 inspection ===
The collapse of the I-35W Mississippi River bridge, a continuous deck truss, in Minneapolis on August 1, 2007, prompted inspections of bridges of similar construction. Four bridges of this type were identified in Michigan, including the Lake Shore Drive Bridge. The bridge was inspected on August 6, 2007, and was determined to be safe.

== Architecture ==
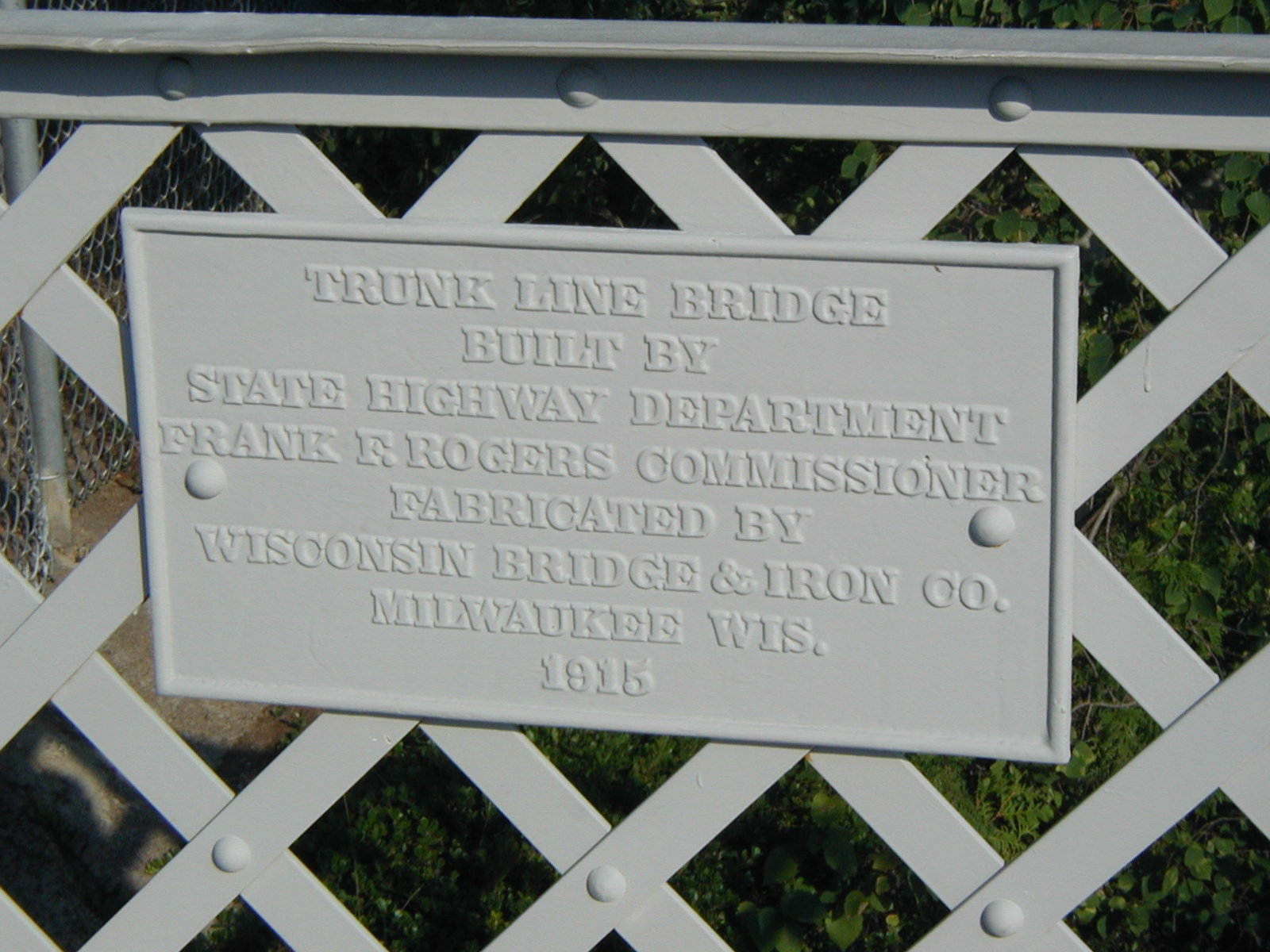
Commemorative placard on the guard rail

The bridge is a Warren deck truss and continuous deck truss made of riveted steel. The 139-foot (42 m) bridge has three spans: a main span of 105 feet (32 m) flanked by two 34-foot (10 m) spans. The guard rails are made of woven steel lattice.

== See also ==
- List of Michigan State Historic Sites in Keweenaw County, Michigan
