= Eagle River Bridge =

Eagle River Bridge may refer to:

- Lake Shore Drive Bridge (Michigan), pedestrian bridge built in 1915
- Eagle River Timber Bridge, automobile bridge built in 1990
