= Central Mine Historic District =

Historic district in Michigan, United States

- U.S. National Register of Historic Places
- U.S. Historic district
- Michigan State Historic Site
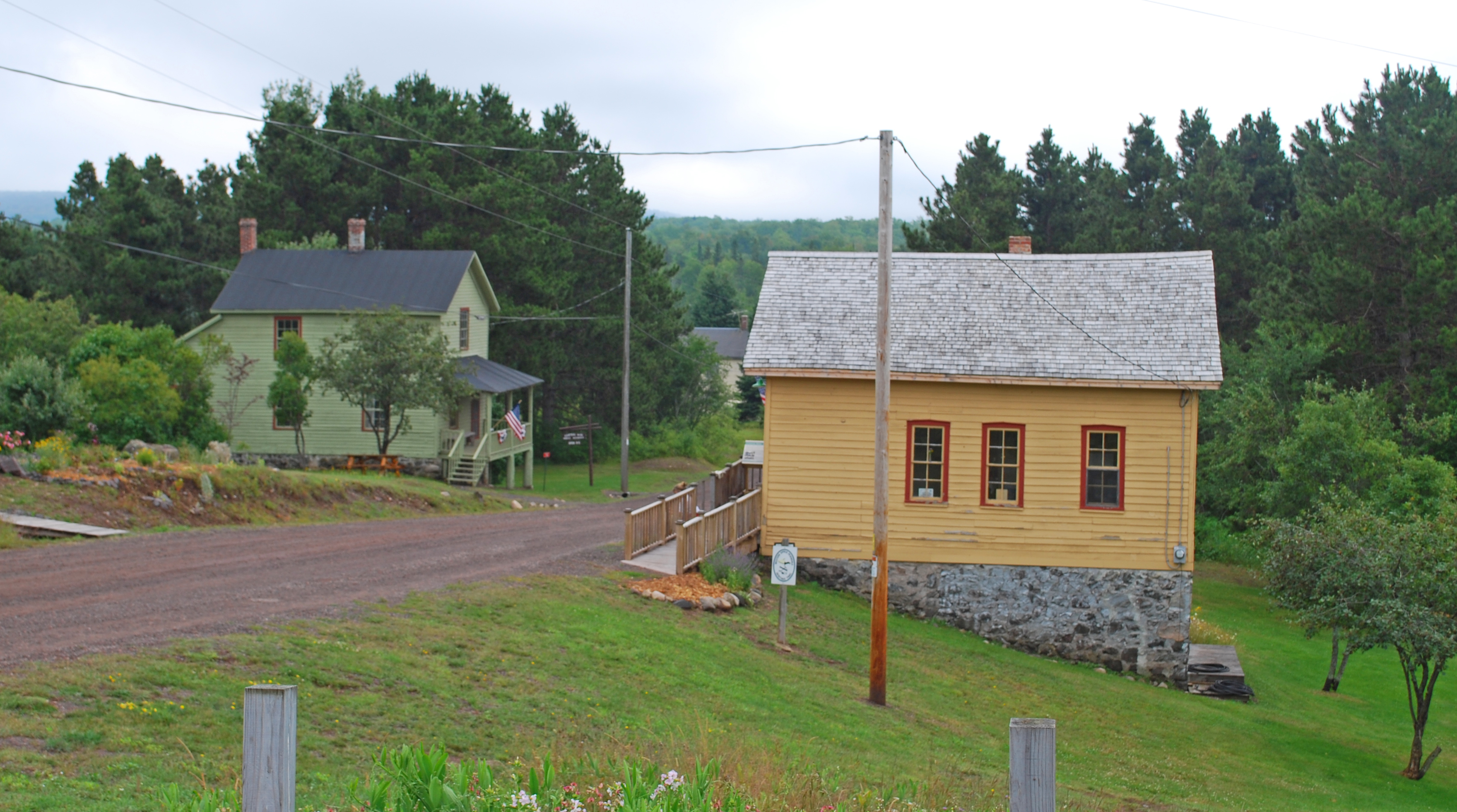
- Street scene

- Location within Michigan Location within the United States
- Interactive map
- Location: Houghton Township, Keweenaw County, near Eagle River, Michigan
- Coordinates: 47°24′21″N 88°11′58″W
- NRHP reference No.: 74000991

Significant dates
- Added to NRHP: June 28, 1974
- Designated MSHS: November 11, 1973

The Central Mine Historic District is a historic district located off US 41 in Upper Michigan. The mine itself was designated a Michigan State Historic Site in 1958, while the surrounding district was designated a Michigan State Historic Site in 1973 and listed on the National Register of Historic Places in 1974.

== Description ==
The Central Mine Historic District covers the remains of the nearly abandoned mining town of Central. The district includes around 20 frame structures from an original 130, as well as scattered ruins. Most remaining structures are frame, two-story company houses on stone foundations. These houses all have gable roofs, porches, and lean-to additions. The district also contains the well-maintained Central Mine Methodist Church, which is in nearly original condition.

== History ==
In 1854, John Shawson, an agent of the Cliff Mine, discovered native copper in the bottom of an ancient pit (apparently dug by Native Americans) several miles from Cliff Mine. The Central Mining Company was organized in 1854 for the purpose of mining copper in the Keweenaw. Mining began in 1856, and the mine's lode proved so rich that Central became was able to turn a profit in its first year of operation. Between 1856 and between then and the end of the 19th century the company built over 130 structures for the mine and the community of workers. At the peak of production in 1868, the town of Central was home to over 130 people, primarily immigrants from Cornwall, England. The mining industry eventually contracted, and by 1887 the Central Mine was the only fully operational mine in Keweenaw County. In 1898 the mine ceased operation, and residents began leaving the town. The last permanent resident left in 1952, although some structures in the area are still used as summer cottages.

== Central Mine and Village ==
The Keweenaw County Historical Society owns 38 acres of the old Central site and operates the Central Mine Visitor Center which features exhibits about the mine and village. Some of the residences can be visited or are being restored.

== Gallery ==
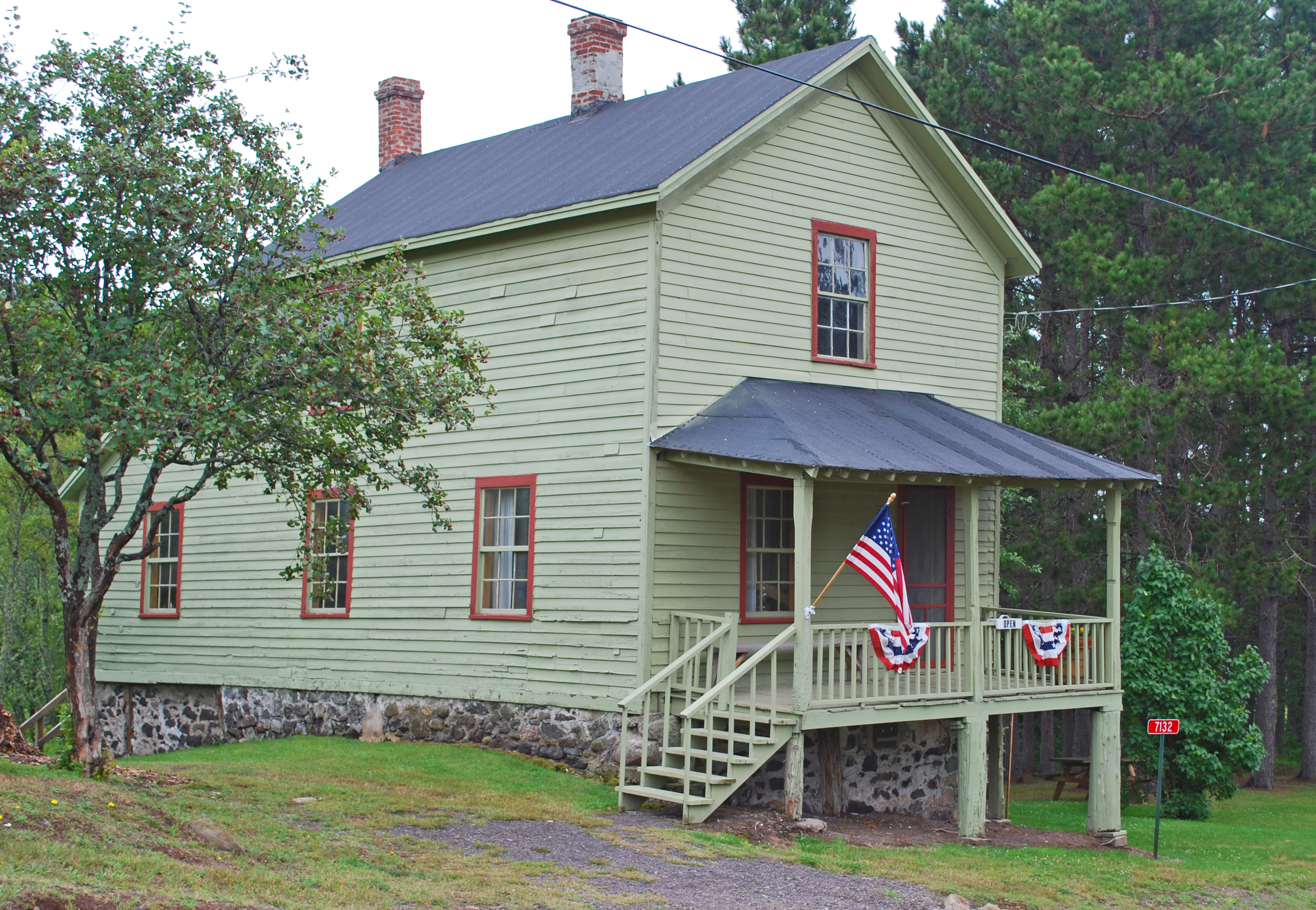
Miner's Residence

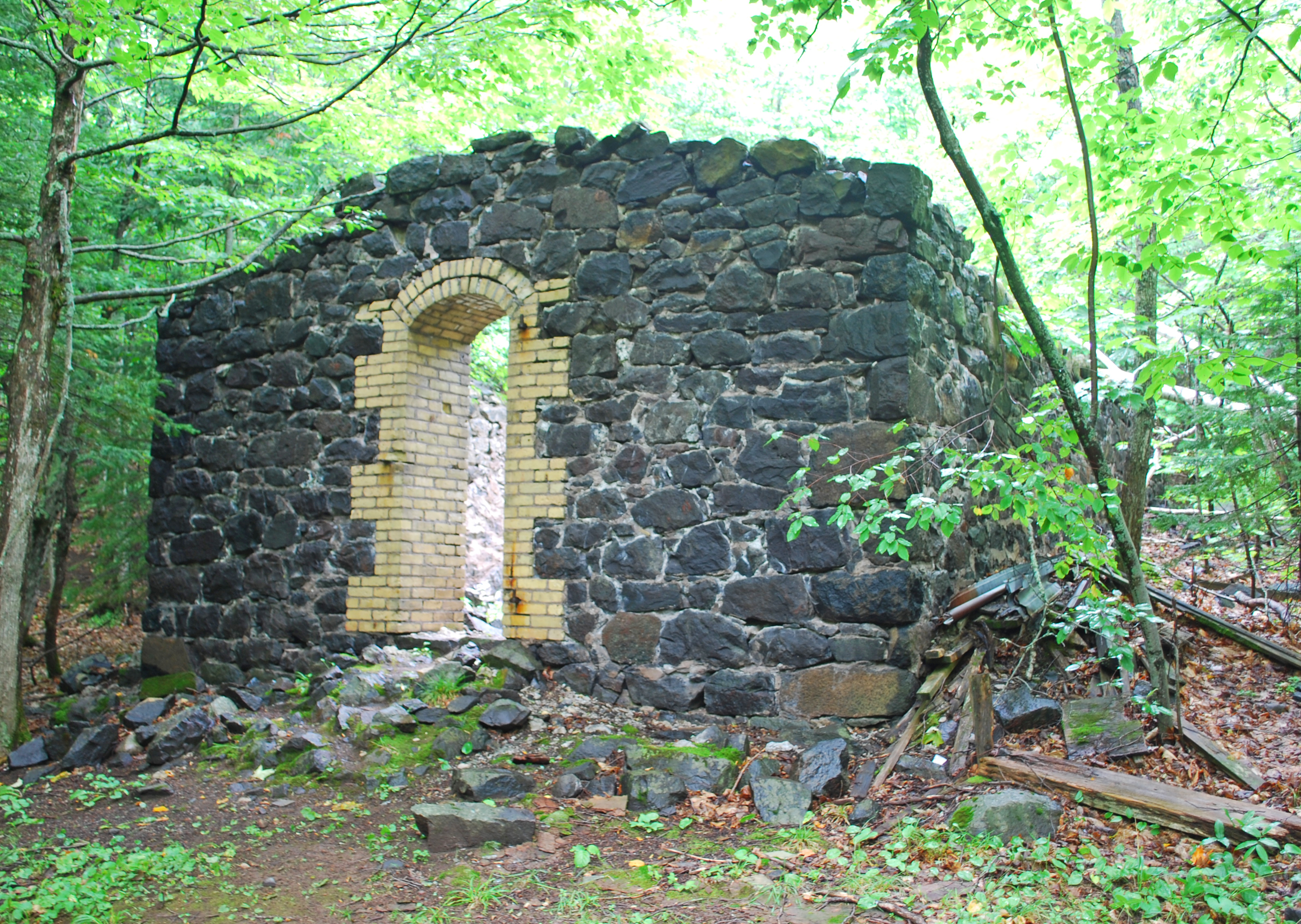
Powderhouse ruins

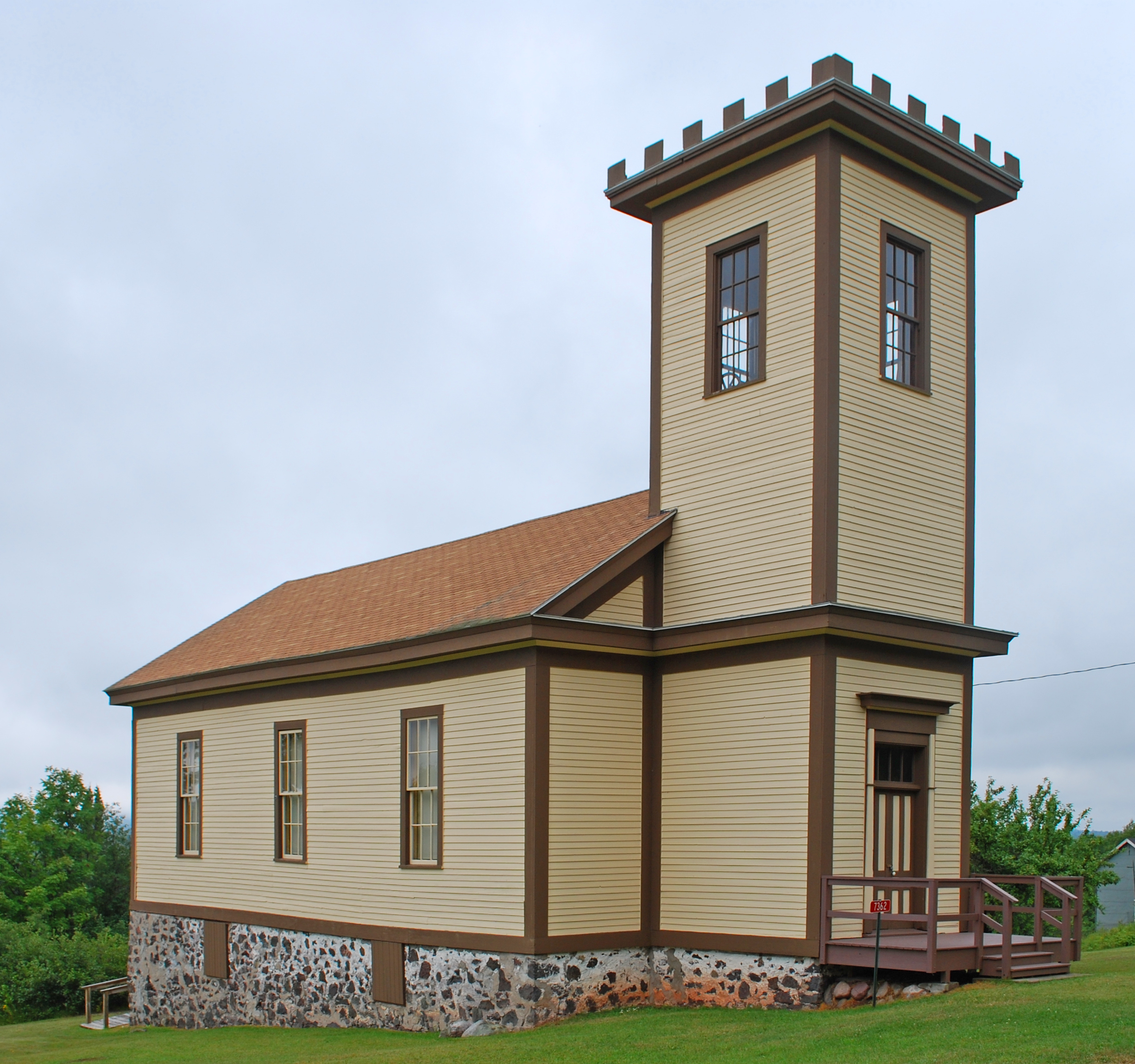
Central Mine Methodist Church
