= Central Mine Methodist Church =

Historic church in Michigan, United States

- U.S. National Register of Historic Places
- U.S. Historic district – Contributing property
- Michigan State Historic Site
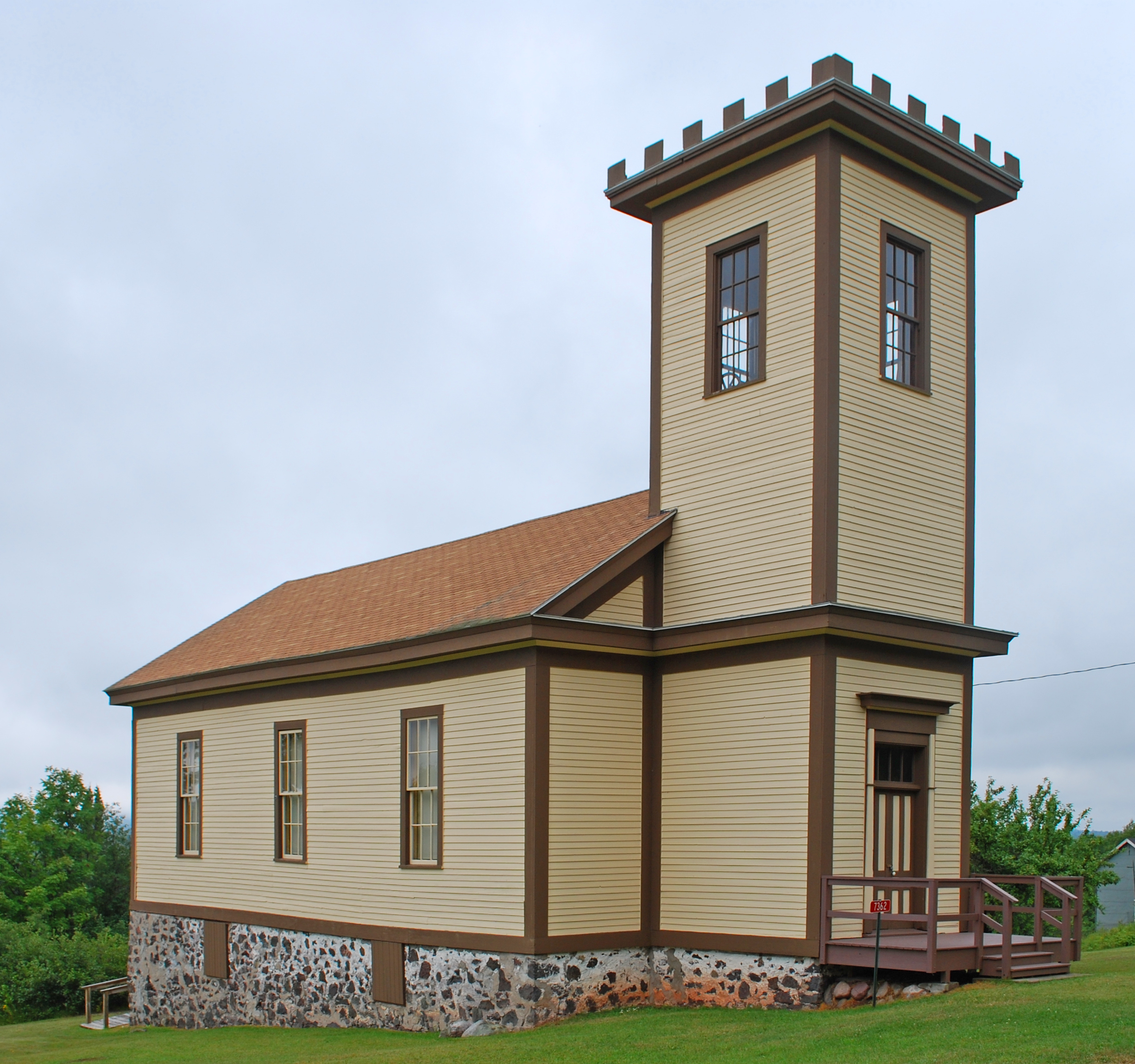

- Location within Michigan Location within the United States
- Interactive map
- Location: Old Stage Rd., Central, Michigan
- Coordinates: 47°24′25″N 88°12′13″W
- Built: 1869
- Architect: Multiple
- Part of: Central Mine Historic District (ID74000991)
- NRHP reference No.: 70000278

Significant dates
- Added to NRHP: October 15, 1970
- Designated MSHS: July 17, 1970

The Central Mine Methodist Church is a church located on Old Stage Road in Central, Michigan, in the Central Mine Historic District. It is one of the few structures being maintained in this nearly deserted mining town. It was listed on the National Register of Historic Places and designated a Michigan State Historic Site in 1970.

== Description ==
The Central Mine Episcopal Church is a single-story rectangular frame church on a stone rubble foundation with basement. The front facade boasts a large square tower with a belfry and castellations on the top. The exterior is clad in wood siding with outlines along each edge; the gabled roof is shingled. The interior sanctuary is approximately 46 feet by 31 feet; an additional vestibule is located in the case of the tower. The sanctuary is furnished with handmade straight-backed pews.

== History ==
The town of Central housed workers from the nearby Central Mine, where copper was mined from 1856 to 1898. Beginning in 1856, worship services were conducted in the Central schoolhouse. Construction on the church was begun in 1868 as a joint effort between the Central Mining Company and employees, primarily immigrants from Cornwall, England. The church was completed in 1869, and promptly became a community center for the town. Peak membership was over 300 people.

However, after the Central Mine closed in 1898, the population in Central swiftly declined and the church closed. In 1907, one of the original residents of Central, Alfred Nicholls, conceived of the idea of a "homecoming," where ex-parishioners would gather at the church once a year. The idea was implemented, and as many as 200 people attended the annual gatherings. These reunion gatherings have been held annually since, and continue into the 21st century

The church is in nearly original condition, with the only changes made in 1879, when some pews were removed, and in 1968 when a bell was hung in the belfry.
