= Twin Lakes State Park =

Twin Lakes State Park may refer to the following state parks in the United Stastes:

- Twin Lakes State Park (Iowa)
- Twin Lakes State Park (Michigan)
- Twin Lakes State Park (Virginia)
