= Misery River =

Location
- Country: United States

Physical characteristics
- Source
  - location: Lake Roland, Houghton County, Michigan
- Mouth
  - location: Misery Bay, Lake Superior
  - elevation: 607 ft (185 m)

Basin features
- Tributaries
  - left: North Branch Misery River, Clear Creek
  - right: Little Misery River, Capone Creek, Butch Creek, Ahola Creek

The Misery River is a 24.2-mile-long (38.9 km) river on the Keweenaw Peninsula of the U.S. state of Michigan.

It is formed from the outflow of Lake Roland in Houghton County, Michigan at 46°53′00″N 88°51′32″W near Twin Lakes State Park and flows into Misery Bay on Lake Superior at 46°59′58″N 88°58′51″W.

== Tributaries ==
- The Little Misery River flows into the Misery River at 46°59′50″N 88°58′52″W, shortly before it flows into Lake Superior.
- The North Branch Misery River flows into the Misery River at 46°57′38″N 88°56′45″W, near the boundary between Ontonagon and Houghton counties.
- Capone Creek flows into the Misery River at 46°56′18″N 88°56′18″W.
- Butch Creek flows into the Misery River at 46°54′54″N 88°53′35″W.
- Clear Creek flows into the Misery River at 46°54′40″N 88°53′14″W.
  - Shawmut Creek flows into Clear Creek at 46°54′40″N 88°53′05″W.
- Ahola Creek flows into the Misery River at 46°53′30″N 88°52′55″W.
