= Eagle River Light =

Lighthouse in Michigan, United States

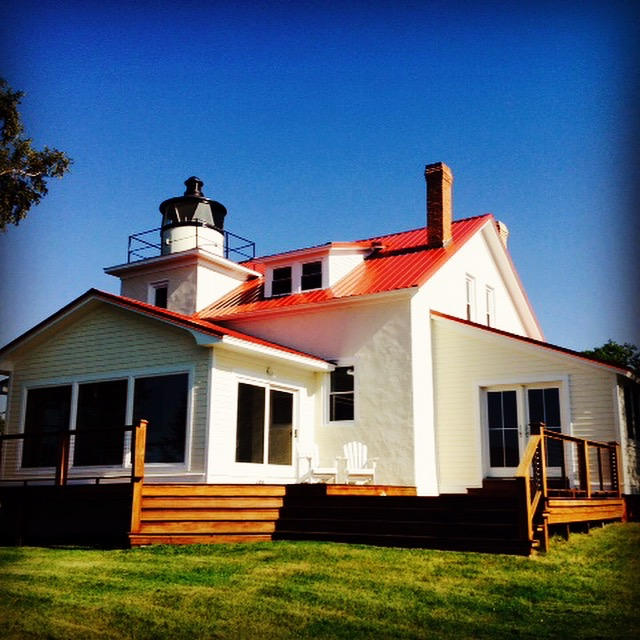
- Location: Eagle River
- Coordinates: 47°24′49.3″N 88°17′53.8″W

Tower
- Constructed: 1858
- Heritage: National Register of Historic Places contributing property

Light
- First lit: 1884
- Deactivated: 1908
- Lens: sixth order Fresnel lens
- Eagle River Light
- U.S. Historic district – Contributing property
- Part of: Eagle River Historic District (ID84001746)
- Designated CP: September 13, 1984

The Eagle River Light is a decommissioned lighthouse at the mouth of the Eagle River in the community of Eagle River on the Keweenaw Peninsula in the U.S. state of Michigan.

== History ==
With the discovery of the "Cliff Lode" in 1845 and the subsequent copper mining operations there, Eagle River became a booming port city and rivaled Copper Harbor as the biggest boom town in the Keweenaw. On September 28, 1850, the United States Congress appropriated $6,500 to construct a light at Eagle River. A site was selected that year, but it took until 1853 for the Michigan Legislature to obtain title to the site. Construction was not completed until 1857.

The light was situated on a sand bluff overlooking Lake Superior on the west bank of the river. The tower was only 24 feet (7.3 m) high, but because of its location on a bluff, the sixth order Fresnel lens could be seen for a distance of ten nautical miles.

Cracks at the base of the station were documented in 1867, and the entire structure was said to be in danger of collapsing. Congress appropriated $14,000 in 1869 to build a replacement, but recalled the funds in 1870 due to a shortfall in the federal budget.

After copper in the Keweenaw area was commercially exhausted, the copper mining boom collapsed. The principal mine, the Cliff Mine, closed in 1873 and the Eagle River port became idle. Although the harbor quickly fell into disrepair, the light station continued to serve as the only marker of the shore between the Keweenaw Waterway and Eagle Harbor.

The station was renovated and partially rebuilt in 1884. By 1892, it was recommended that the light station be decommissioned and a new light be built a few miles to the east at Five Mile Point. In 1893, Congress authorized construction of the Sand Hills Lighthouse, but failed to appropriate any funds to carry out the construction. This situation continued for many years. The Eagle River Light Station was decommissioned in 1908 and its buildings were sold at auction in that year to John Vertin, a successful merchant from Calumet. The replacement light would not be built until 1917 and after at least ten vessels had been lost on the nearby Sawtooth Reef.

The Eagle River Lighthouse was sold by the Vertin family in the 1990s to Edward “Bud” Cole, a historic preservationist with a family lineage in the Keweenaw dating back to the 1850s. Along with the Eagle River Lighthouse, he also owns several other historically significant buildings in Eagle River and over 4000 acres of the Eagle River forestland corridor with 3 miles of Eagle River running through the property. Cole is also the owner of the Sandhills Lighthouse purchased in March 2019.

The Eagle River Lighthouse is available for rent on Homeaway.

== See also ==
- Lighthouses in the United States

== Specialized Further reading ==
- LaFave, Michael (Mackinac Center), Privatization Shines (article on the general subject of privatization of lighthouses).
