= Sand Hills Light =

Lighthouse in Michigan, United States

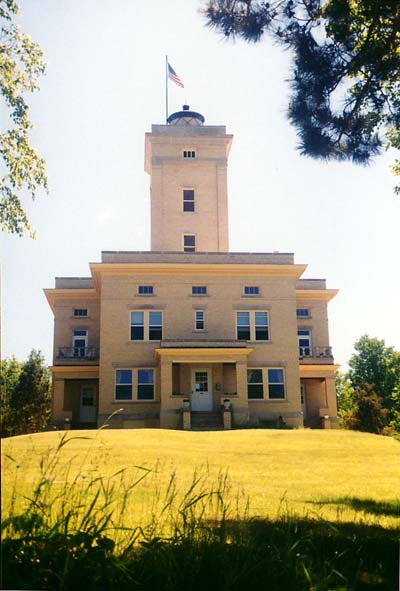
- Location: Ahmeek, Michigan
- Coordinates: 47°23′31″N 88°22′13.5″W

Tower
- Constructed: 1919
- Construction: Yellow brick
- Automated: 1939
- Height: 91 feet (28 m)
- Shape: Square
- Markings: natural with black lantern and trim
- Heritage: National Register of Historic Places listed place

Light
- First lit: 1919
- Deactivated: 1954
- Focal height: 93 feet (28 m)
- Lens: Fourth order Fresnel lens with bullseye
- Range: 16 nautical miles; 29 kilometres (18 mi)
- Sand Hills Light Station
- U.S. National Register of Historic Places
- Nearest city: Mohawk, Michigan
- Area: 55 acres (22 ha)
- Architect: Park, Charles A.
- Architectural style: Classical Revival
- NRHP reference No.: 94000746
- Added to NRHP: July 27, 1994

Sand Hills was an active lighthouse on the shore of Lake Superior is on private property and is currently closed to the public. It is located in Ahmeek in Keweenaw County in the Keweenaw Peninsula, which is the northern part of the Upper Peninsula in Michigan. It was listed in the National Register of Historic Places in 1994.

== History ==
From 1857 to 1908, Eagle River Light was the only lighthouse between the Keweenaw Waterway and Eagle Harbor Light. With the end of the copper boom in the 1870s the Eagle River, Michigan harbor started to decay. "By the 1890s, it seemed the only ship coming into the harbor was the lighthouse service tender." It was recommended to build a new lighthouse at Sand Hills where most of the lake traffic passing and to decommission Eagle River.

A lighthouse at Sand Hills was authorized by Congress in 1893, but no funds were allocated for its construction. Meanwhile, the Eagle River Light was decommissioned and sold in 1908, leaving no navigation light in the area. Sand Hills Light was finally commissioned in 1917, in part as a response to a number of ships that had run aground on the nearby Sawtooth Reef since the dismantling of the light at Eagle River. Sand Hills is about halfway between Eagle Harbor Light and Ontonagon, Michigan.

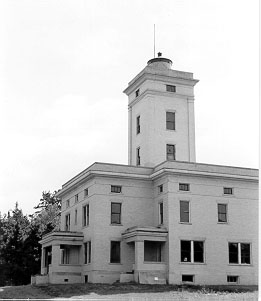
Undated USCG photo

The lighthouse was completed in May 1919 and was in service for 20 years as an aid to navigation operated by 3 keepers. The site includes an oil house, garage, barracks building (1916, and used in World War II, and a concrete breakwater (1917).

The station originally had a Fourth Order bullseye lens lighted by an oil vapor lamp, which was visible for 9.6 nautical miles; 18 kilometres (11 mi).

In 1939, the Coast Guard assumed responsibility for the Lighthouse and automated its use, eliminating the need for keepers.

In 1942, it was converted to a wartime Coast Guard training facility, housing and schooling roughly 200 trainees at a time. In 1943 it was closed as a training location and reverted to being simply a lighthouse.

It continued as an active lighthouse until 1954, when it was decommissioned, in part due to improvements in weather forecasting and the adoption of radar.

It stayed empty and idle through the next few years, finally being liquidated and sold at public auction in 1958 for $26,000 to H. Donald Bliss, an insurance agent from the Detroit area.

In 1961, it was sold again to Bill Frabotta, a Detroit photographer and artist who used the fog station as a summer cottage. In 1992, Mr. Frabotta began a comprehensive 3 year rebuilding project, and along with his wife, Mary, converted the entire facility into a premier Bed and Breakfast Inn, which after a long successful run closed permanently in 2018 and sold in 2019 to local Eagle River resident, Edward “Bud” Cole, owner of the Eagle River Lighthouse, which is the older sister to the Sand Hills Lighthouse.

Edward “Bud” Cole is an international businessman and a historical preservationist with a family lineage in the Keweenaw going back to the 1850s. Mr. Cole also owns and stewards the Eagle River Lighthouse and several other historically significant buildings in the historic town of Eagle River, Michigan along with over 1000 contiguous acres surrounding Sand Hills Lighthouse and over 4000 acres of the Eagle River Corridor. Mr. Cole, currently President of Fender Music Asia Pacific since 2014, lives between Tokyo, Japan and Eagle River, Michigan.

The original fourth order Fresnel lens is on display at Dossin Great Lakes Museum in Detroit.

Sand Hills Light is the "twin" of the ill-fated 1940 Scotch Cap Light on Alaska's Unimak Island. Scotch Cap Light was destroyed on April 1, 1946 when a massive tsunami struck the station, destroying it and killing its five-man crew, the worst disaster to ever befall a land-based Coast Guard light station.

== Getting there ==
The Lighthouse is located in Ahmeek, Michigan and is closed to the public at this time.

The lighthouse is privately owned. The grounds, lighthouse, and property are closed to the public.

== See also ==
- Lighthouses in the United States
