= Little Misery River =

Location
- Country: United States

Physical characteristics
- Source
  - location: Ontonagon County, Michigan
- Mouth
  - location: Misery River
  - elevation: 604 ft (184 m)

The Little Misery River is a 7.0-mile-long (11.3 km) river on the Keweenaw Peninsula of the U.S. state of Michigan. It flows into the Misery River at 46°59′50″N 88°58′52″W, shortly before it flows into Lake Superior.
