= Portage Charter Township, Michigan =

Portage Township, Michigan
- Charter township
- Charter Township of Portage
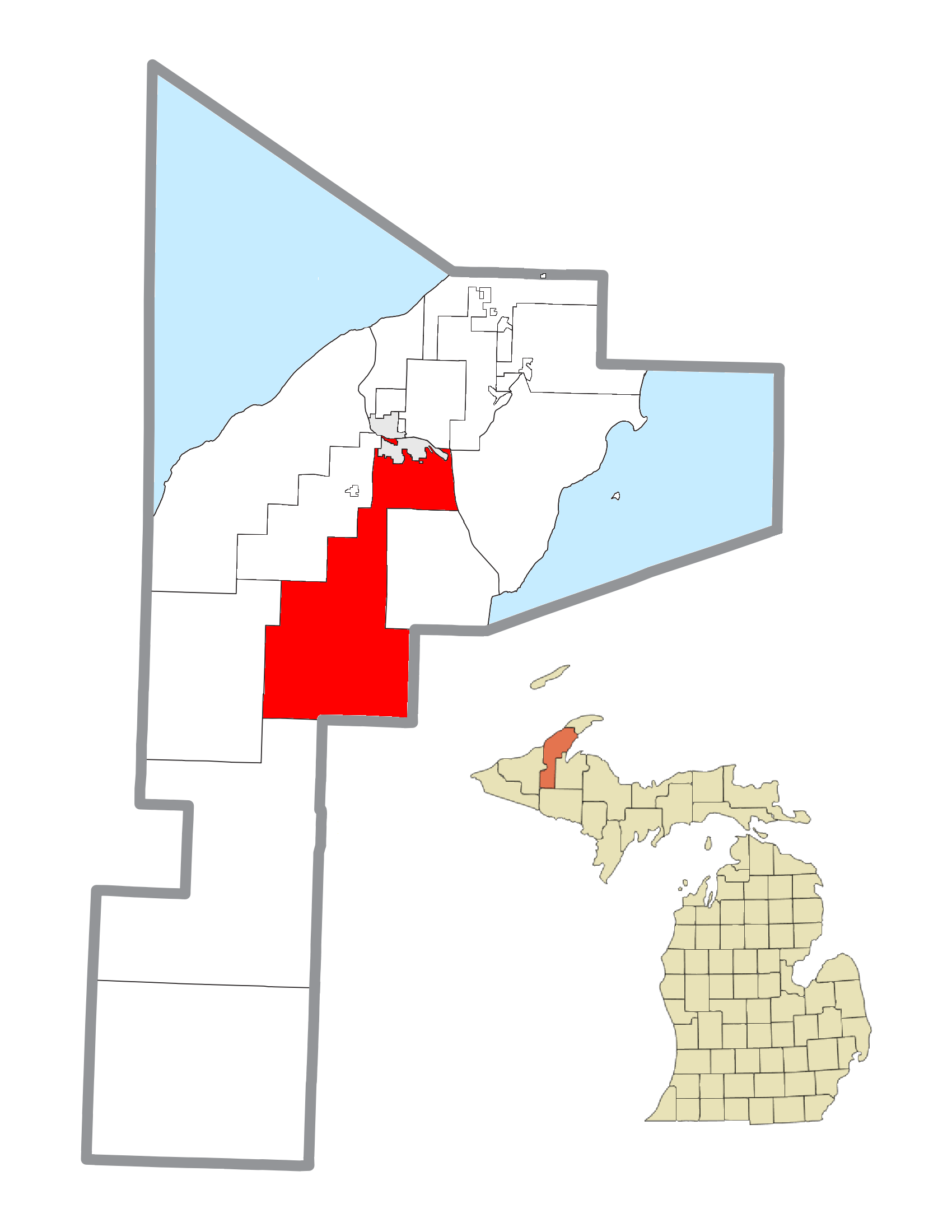
- Location within Houghton County

- Location within the state of Michigan
- Coordinates: 47°00′58″N 88°36′34″W
- Country: United States
- State: Michigan
- County: Houghton
- Established: 1849

Government
  - Supervisor: Bruce Petersen

Area
  - Total: 116.6 sq mi (301.9 km^{2})
  - Land: 112.1 sq mi (290.3 km^{2})
  - Water: 4.5 sq mi (11.6 km^{2})
- Elevation: 896 ft (273 m)

Population (2020)
  - Total: 3,189
  - Density: 28.45/sq mi (10.99/km^{2})
- Time zone: UTC-5 (Eastern (EST))
  - Summer (DST): UTC-4 (EDT)
- ZIP code(s): 49916 (Chassell); 49921 (Dodgeville); 49931 (Houghton); 49958 (Pelkie); 49965 (Toivola)
- Area code: 906
- FIPS code: 26-65540
- GNIS feature ID: 1626925
- Website: Official website

Portage Charter Township is a charter township of Houghton County in the U.S. state of Michigan. As of the 2020 census, the township population was 3,189. The city of Houghton is adjacent to the north side of the township. Portage Lake is the eastern boundary in the north, and the township extends well south of Houghton to the Baraga County line.

== Communities ==
- Askel is a small unincorporated community in the township.
- Dakota Heights is a small unincorporated community in the township, cut off from the rest of the township by the city of Houghton.
- Dodgeville is an unincorporated community and census-designated place (CDP) within the township.
- Elo is an unincorporated place founded in 1900. It had a post office from 1908 until 1957.
- Hurontown is an unincorporated community and census-designated place (CDP) within the township.
- Isle Royale Location is an unincorporated community in the township.
- Pilgrim is a small, unincorporated community in the township.
- Superior Location is an unincorporated community in the township.
- Tapiola is an unincorporated community located near Otter Lake in the township.

== Geography ==
According to the United States Census Bureau, the township has a total area of 116.6 square miles (301.9 km^{2}), of which 112.1 square miles (290.3 km^{2}) are land and 4.5 square miles (11.6 km^{2}), or 3.85%, are water.

== Demographics ==
As of the census of 2000, there were 3,156 people, 1,257 households, and 804 families residing in the township. The population density was 28.0 inhabitants per square mile (10.8/km^{2}). There were 1,584 housing units at an average density of 14.1 per square mile (5.4/km^{2}). The racial makeup of the township was 95.98% White, 0.22% African American, 0.41% Native American, 2.15% Asian, 0.25% from other races, and 0.98% from two or more races. Hispanic or Latino of any race were 0.73% of the population. 35.7% were of Finnish, 15.6% German, 6.5% English, 5.8% French and 5.1% Italian ancestry according to Census 2000.

There were 1,257 households, out of which 28.1% had children under the age of 18 living with them, 53.4% were married couples living together, 6.3% had a female householder with no husband present, and 36.0% were non-families. 26.9% of all households were made up of individuals, and 9.8% had someone living alone who was 65 years of age or older. The average household size was 2.49 and the average family size was 3.04.

In the township the population was spread out, with 23.7% under the age of 18, 15.2% from 18 to 24, 23.8% from 25 to 44, 24.0% from 45 to 64, and 13.3% who were 65 years of age or older. The median age was 36 years. For every 100 females, there were 113.4 males. For every 100 females age 18 and over, there were 112.0 males.

The median income for a household in the township was $33,080, and the median income for a family was $44,213. Males had a median income of $33,958 versus $23,221 for females. The per capita income for the township was $17,655. About 8.1% of families and 14.2% of the population were below the poverty line, including 14.6% of those under age 18 and 8.9% of those age 65 or over.
