= Eagle River Timber Bridge =

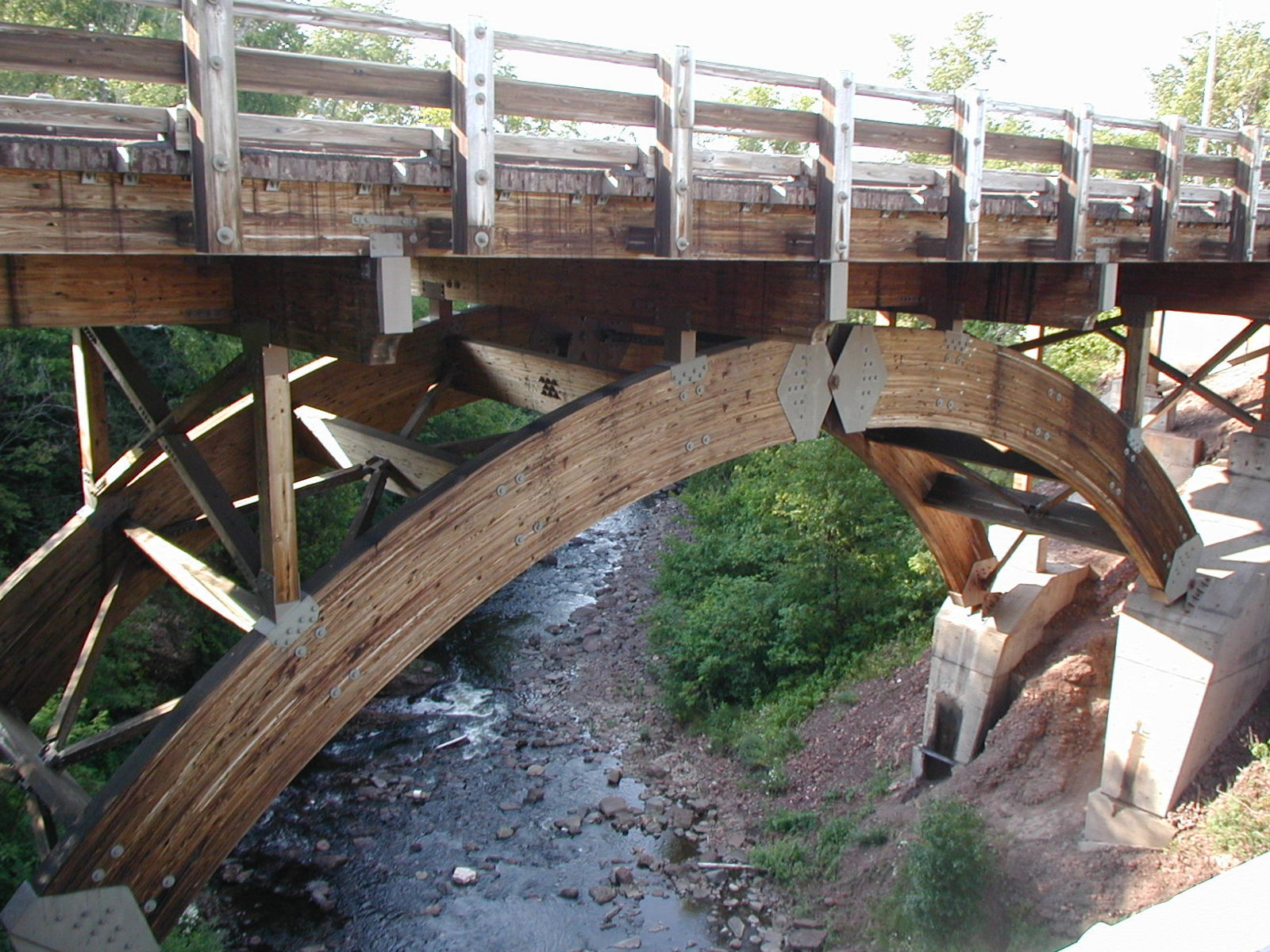
- Coordinates: 47.4125°N 88.297°W
- Carries: Automobiles
- Crosses: Eagle River
- Locale: Eagle River, Michigan
- Other name: Eagle River Bridge
- ID number: 42142021000B050
- Preceded by: Lake Shore Drive Bridge

Characteristics
- Material: Wood and steel
- Total length: 152 feet (46 m)
- Width: 35 feet (11 m)
- Height: 50 feet (15 m)
- Longest span: 79 feet (24 m) (Note: One arch spans 74 feet (23 m), the other spans 79 feet (24 m).)

History
- Construction start: 1988
- Opened: 1990

Statistics
- Daily traffic: 849 (in 2007)

Location
- Interactive map of Eagle River Timber Bridge

The Eagle River Timber Bridge is a wooden arch bridge carrying highway M-26 over the Eagle River in Eagle River, Michigan. It opened in 1990 as a replacement for the historic Lake Shore Drive Bridge that runs parallel to it.

== History ==
Construction on the bridge began in 1988. The quantity of wood used was equivalent to three or four average-size houses. The bridge opened for highway M-26 traffic in 1990, at which point the neighboring Lake Shore Drive Bridge was restricted to pedestrian use.

On August 26, 1992, the bridge was entered into the 1992 Timber Bridge Design and Construction Award Competition. It was awarded first place in the "Long Span Vehicular Bridges" category.

== Design ==
The bridge is primarily constructed of wood joined with steel connectors. It is supported by two adjacent structural glued laminated timber arches: one spans 74 feet (23 m) and the other 79 feet (24 m). Each arch is constructed from two curved sections joined by a crown hinge. The road deck is made of wood and covered by an asphalt road surface.

All the timber members were structural glued laminated and pressure treated with preservative pentachlorophenol in oil. Arches and girts and deck beams were manufactured by Sentinel Structures, Inc. at Peshtigo, Wisconsin. Any wooden portions which were cut or drilled also had an application of copper naphthenate. The steel pins in the hinges at the crown and abutments were chrome plated to reduce friction and prevent corrosion. All other steel was hot-dipped galvanized, given a tie-coat, and covered by epoxy and a top coat of brown urethane, a system designed to provide thirty years of protection. The engineered timber members were manufactured in Peshtigo, Wisconsin by Sentinel Structures, Inc.

Bridge maintenance consists of reapplying preservative to all wooden members and any necessary tightening of bolts.
