= Edward Thomas Abrams =

American physician and politician (1860–1918)

- Born: November 20, 1860; Eagle River
- Died: May 20, 1918 (aged 57); Dollar Bay
- Education: Valparaiso University, Geisel School of Medicine
- Occupation: Surgeon, politician

Edward Thomas Abrams (November 20, 1860 – May 20, 1918) was an American physician.

== Early life ==
Abram was born on November 20, 1860, to Michael and Lydia Chegwyn Abrams, came from Cornwall, England. Abrams was born in a miner's cabin in Eagle River, Michigan, November 20, 1860. His early life was a period of hard struggle to gain an education. Between the ages of thirteen and eighteen, he was apprenticed to a blacksmith; he then began to teach at a country school to earn the money which would enable him to go to college. After obtaining in 1883 a Bachelor of Science degree at Valparaiso, he attended Dartmouth Medical School, from which he was graduated in 1889. Later he did postgraduate work at Long Island College Hospital, and in 1902 Olivet conferred on him the honorary degree of Master of Arts. The doctor began his practice in Centennial, Michigan, and later removed to Dollar Bay, where he spent the remainder of his life.

In 1890, he was married to Ida L. Howe, of Howell, Mich. One child, a daughter, was born to them, but died in early infancy. He was survived by his wife, several sisters and two brothers, one of whom, James Abrams, was a physician at Calumet, Mich.

== Career ==
In 1907, he was elected to the Michigan House of Representatives. His legislative experience and knowledge of parliamentary procedure made him the backbone of medical legislation in the state. Appreciation of the fairness of his nature was shown, when in 1913, during the copper miners' strike, the State appointed him as intermediary between agitators and employers. He was a politician of high type, straightforward and relentless in his pursuit of right. Nothing could stop him when on the trail of error, if he believed his action would be beneficial. It was said of him that he had improved medical measures more than any other man in Michigan. These same characteristics were not only evidenced in state affairs, but had an influence national in scope. In demand as a public speaker, he rarely spoke at length, but with an earnest manner and delivery. His knowledge of history, combined with enthusiasm, made him an interesting speaker. He was an authority in the state on Cornish history, beliefs and customs, loyal to the spirit of his ancestry. Abrams was the owner of a medical library with full files of about twenty periodicals.

He was intensely patriotic and at the time of his death was president of the local chapter of the Red Cross, member of the state committee, Council of National Defense, and, as acting president of the State Board of Health, was much interested in Camp Custer, and made frequent visits there.

Physically, Abrams was small, wiry and active. At one time he was fond of wrestling. Perhaps because of his slender hands, he was said to be very accurate during delicate operations.

Besides being a member of the American Association of Obstetricians and Gynecologists, Abrams belonged to the American Medical Association, was a member of the state and local medical organizations, charter member of the A. K. K., one of the oldest medical fraternities. He was also member of the American Society of Social and Political Economics and the American Geographical Society.

He was surgeon to various railroad and mining companies in the Upper Peninsula, consulting surgeon and lecturer on gynecology and obstetrics at the Lake Superior General Hospital, Lake Linden and surgeon-in-chief to St. Joseph's Hospital at Hancock.

His last appearance in public was in addressing a gathering for the Red Cross the evening before his death. His talk was masterly and full of feeling. It was remarked that he spoke from first to last as one inspired, as one apart and looking on. He died on May 20, 1918, aged 57, after an evening spent in study in his library.
