= Dakota Heights, Michigan =

- Location within Michigan
- Coordinates: 47°07′05″N 88°35′13″W
- Country: United States
- State: Michigan
- County: Houghton
- Township: Portage
- Platted: 1906
- Time zone: UTC-5 (Eastern (EST))
  - Summer (DST): UTC-4 (EDT)
- ZIP Code(s): 49931 (Houghton)
- Area code: 906

Dakota Heights is an unincorporated community in Portage Charter Township, Houghton County in the U.S. state of Michigan. It is an enclave surrounded on all four sides by the extreme western part of the city of Houghton (on the fourth by Portage Lake (or, depending on the definition of terms, the Portage Lake Shipping Canal)); it is non-contiguous with any other part of Portage Township. (However, it was formerly served by the water lines of Adams Township.) Living in Dakota Heights is at least sometimes regarded as living "in town" (Houghton).

== History ==
Dakota Heights was platted in 1906 and named after the Dacotah Mining Company, which operated briefly in its vicinity. It provided housing for workers on the Copper Range Railroad, which had a number of facilities immediately to the north; the company owned most of the housing. It remains "primarily residential," though some businesses have opened (and closed) in it over the years, including a former motel, and currently a podiatrist's office, restaurant spa, and bank.

== Geography ==
Dakota Heights originally sat at the west end of Houghton's Shelden Avenue. West of Dakota Heights was originally countryside, prior to the development of the M-26 corridor that began in the mid-1970s.

=== Climate ===
Dakota Heights has a humid continental climate but winters are typically long and snowy with much lake effect snow.

=== Environmental issues ===
Pollution in Huron Creek, arguably from inadequate private septic systems has contributed to the growth of algae.

== Education ==
The local school district is Houghton-Portage Township Schools. Students K-12 are served by Houghton Elementary (K-5), Middle (6-8), and High (9-12) schools.Houghton-Portage Township Schools

The Rock School formerly served Dakota Heights and the surrounding area.

== Infrastructure ==
=== Transportation ===
In 1979 Highway M-26 was rerouted through the community, bisecting it. Park Avenue had formerly served as the main route from Houghton to Atlantic Mine, but this was replaced by the new route of the highway.

Houghton Motor Transit operates a demand bus that serves the community, but "curb to curb" services is only for Houghton residents, and as it is outside the city limits of Houghton rates with one terminus in Dakota Heights are higher. However, there are no regularly scheduled route buses operating in the community.

A snowmobile trail runs along Dakota Heights' Park Avenue.
