= Scotch Cap Light =

Lighthouse in Alaska, United States

- Location: Unimak Island, Alaska, United States
- Coordinates: 54°23′40″N 164°44′41″W
- Operator: United States Coast Guard
- Active light
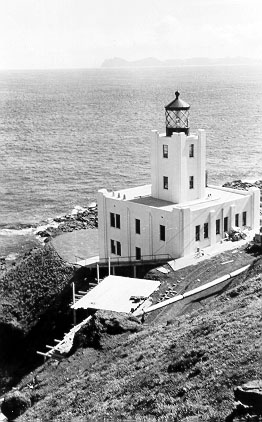
- Constructed: 1971
- Construction: metal
- Height: 26 ft (7.9 m)
- Shape: square
- Power source: solar power
- Operator: United States Coast Guard
- Focal height: 110 ft (34 m)
- Range: 9 nmi (17 km; 10 mi)
- Characteristic: Fl W 6s
- 1950 light
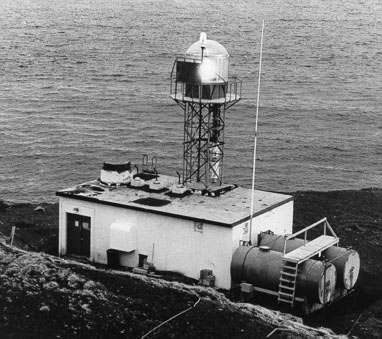
- Constructed: 1950
- Construction: masonry
- Lens: third order Fresnel lens
- 1903 light
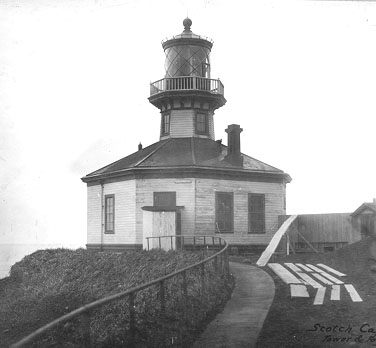
- Constructed: 1903
- Construction: lumber
- Height: 45 ft (14 m)
- Shape: octagon
- 1940 light
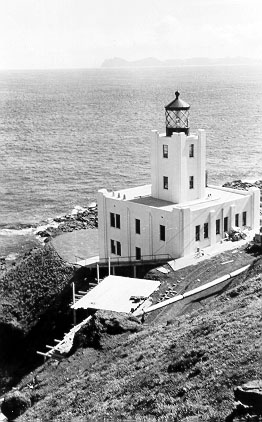
- Constructed: 1940
- Construction: concrete
- Shape: square
- Deactivated: 1 April 1946

The Scotch Cap Light is a series of lighthouses located on the southwest corner of Unimak Island in Alaska. It was the first station established on the outside coast of Alaska.

== History ==
The Scotch Cap Light was built in 1903 as a 45-foot (14 meter) wood tower on an octagonal wooden building. According to the Coast Guard Historian's Office, the lighthouse was witness to several shipwrecks.

In 1909, the cannery supply ship Columbia wrecked. The 194 crew members were guests of the keepers for two weeks before a rescue ship could remove them. In 1930, the Japanese freighter Koshun Maru became lost in a snowstorm and beached near the light. In 1940, a new concrete reinforced lighthouse and fog-signal building was erected near the site of the original lighthouse. In 1942, the Russian freighter Turksib wrecked near the station. The 60 survivors lived at the station for several weeks because rough seas prevented a rescue ship from reaching the station.

The 1940 aid to navigation was the "twin" of the Sand Hills Light in Michigan's Keweenaw Peninsula, replicating much of its design.

On April 1, 1946, the station was destroyed by a massive tsunami created by a powerful earthquake. The entire five-man crew was killed; they were Anthony Petit, the lighthouse keeper; Jack Colvin, fireman first class; Dewey Dykstra, seaman first class; Leonard Pickering, motor machinist's mate second class; and Paul James Ness, seaman first class. This was the worst disaster to ever befall a land-based Coast Guard light station. Keeper-class cutter USCGC Anthony Petit (WLM-558), based in Ketchikan, Alaska, is named in honor of the fallen lighthouse keeper.

In 1946, in the wake of the tsunami disaster, a temporary unwatched light was established. The new permanent structure was completed in the early 1950s, and the temporary light was discontinued. The lighthouse was automated in 1971. A skeletal tower replaced the 1950s structure, and the fog signal was discontinued.

== See also ==
- List of lighthouses in the United States
