= Eagle River Historic District =

Historic district in Michigan, United States

- U.S. National Register of Historic Places
- U.S. Historic district
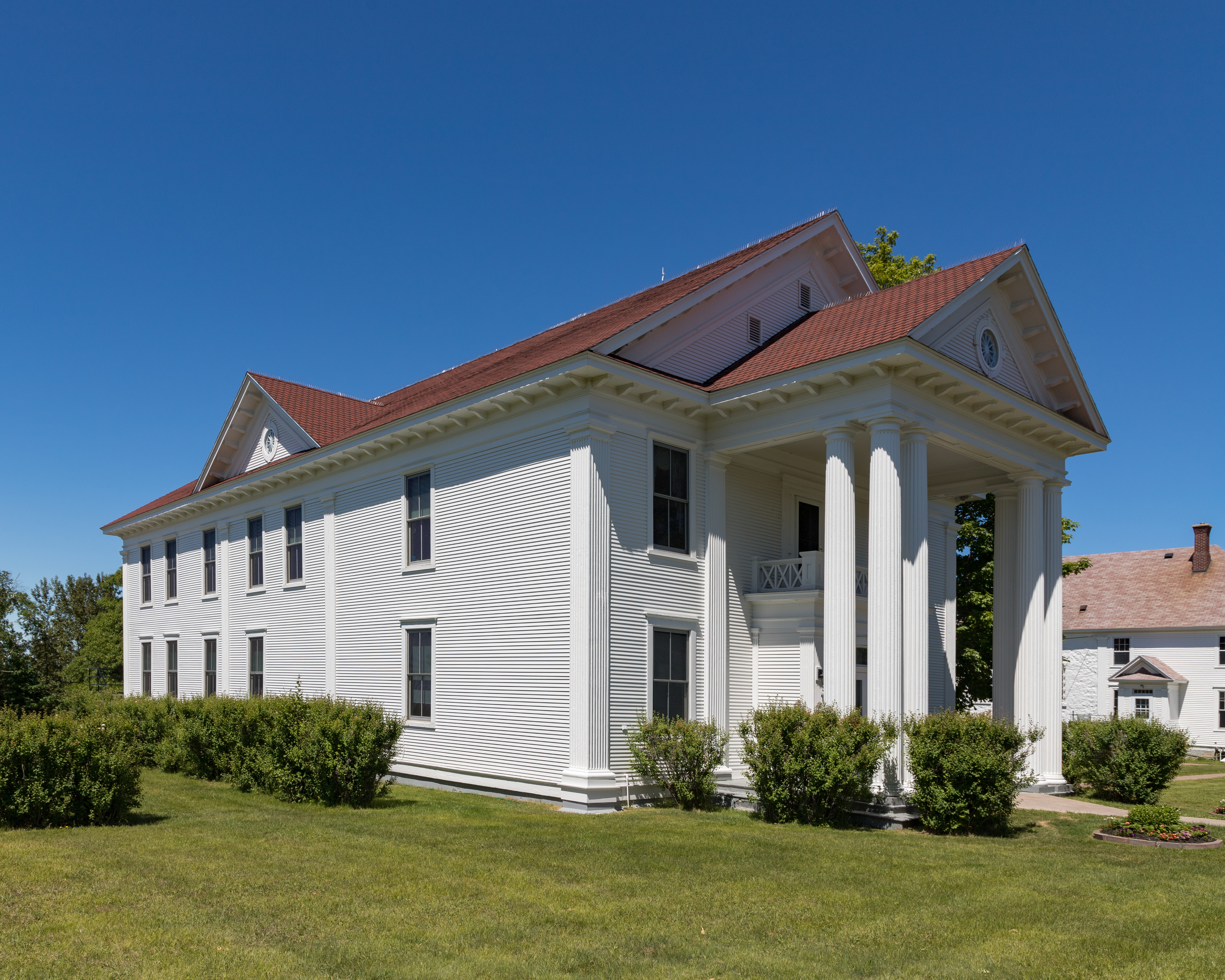
- Keweenaw County Courthouse

- Location within Michigan Location within the United States
- Interactive map
- Location: Roughly Front, 2nd, 3rd, 4th, 5th, and Main Sts., Eagle River, Michigan
- Coordinates: 47°24′48″N 88°17′48″W
- Architect: J. B. Sweatt
- Architectural style: Colonial Revival
- NRHP reference No.: 84001746
- Added to NRHP: September 13, 1984

The Eagle River Historic District is a historic district located in Eagle River, Michigan, roughly covering Front Street, 2nd Street, 3rd Street, 4th Street, 5th Street, and Main Street. The district was listed on the National Register of Historic Places in 1984.

== History ==
The community of Eagle River, founded in 1843, is one of the oldest settlements in the Keweenaw Peninsula. When Keweenaw County was organized, Eagle River was named the county seat. Its location on the shore of Lake Superior made Eagle River a natural port, and it served as a major shipping hub for the copper mined in the Keweenaw in the mid-19th century.

== Description ==
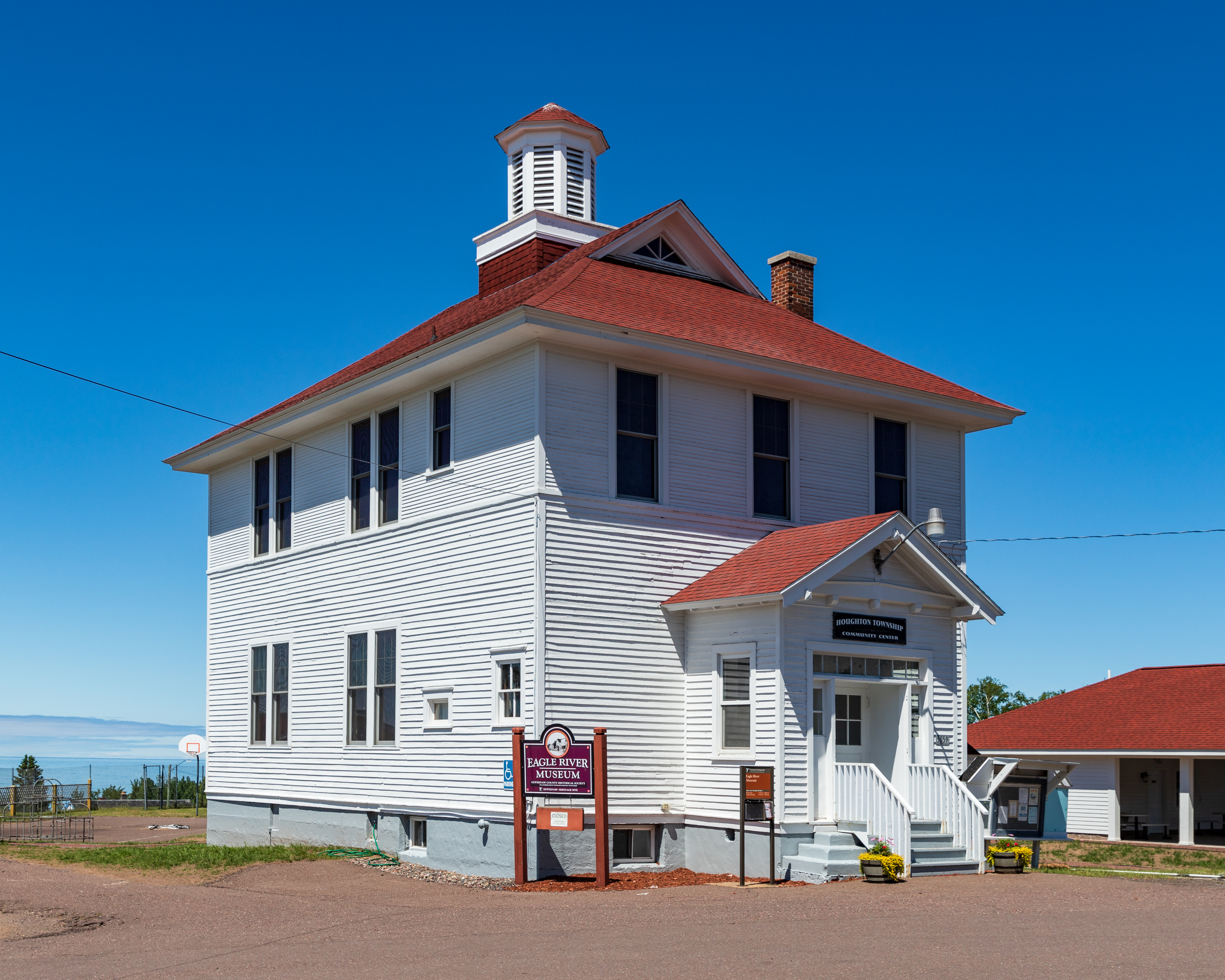
Eagle River Museum and Houghton Township Community Center, Eagle River, Michigan

The Eagle River Historic District includes most of the remaining structures that date from the early settlement of the community. These include early industrial plants as well as county buildings, commercial buildings, and private residences.

The earliest buildings, dating from the 1840s and 1850s, are located along East Main Street. These buildings, both commercial and residential, are simple rectangular structures, typically with symmetrical facades, gable roofs, and rear extensions. Other significant buildings include the town hall/school; the Keweenaw County Courthouse, Sheriff's residence, and jail; and the Eagle River Lighthouse. The district also includes stone and frame buildings structures that were once a fuse factory and brewery.
