= Eagle River (Michigan) =

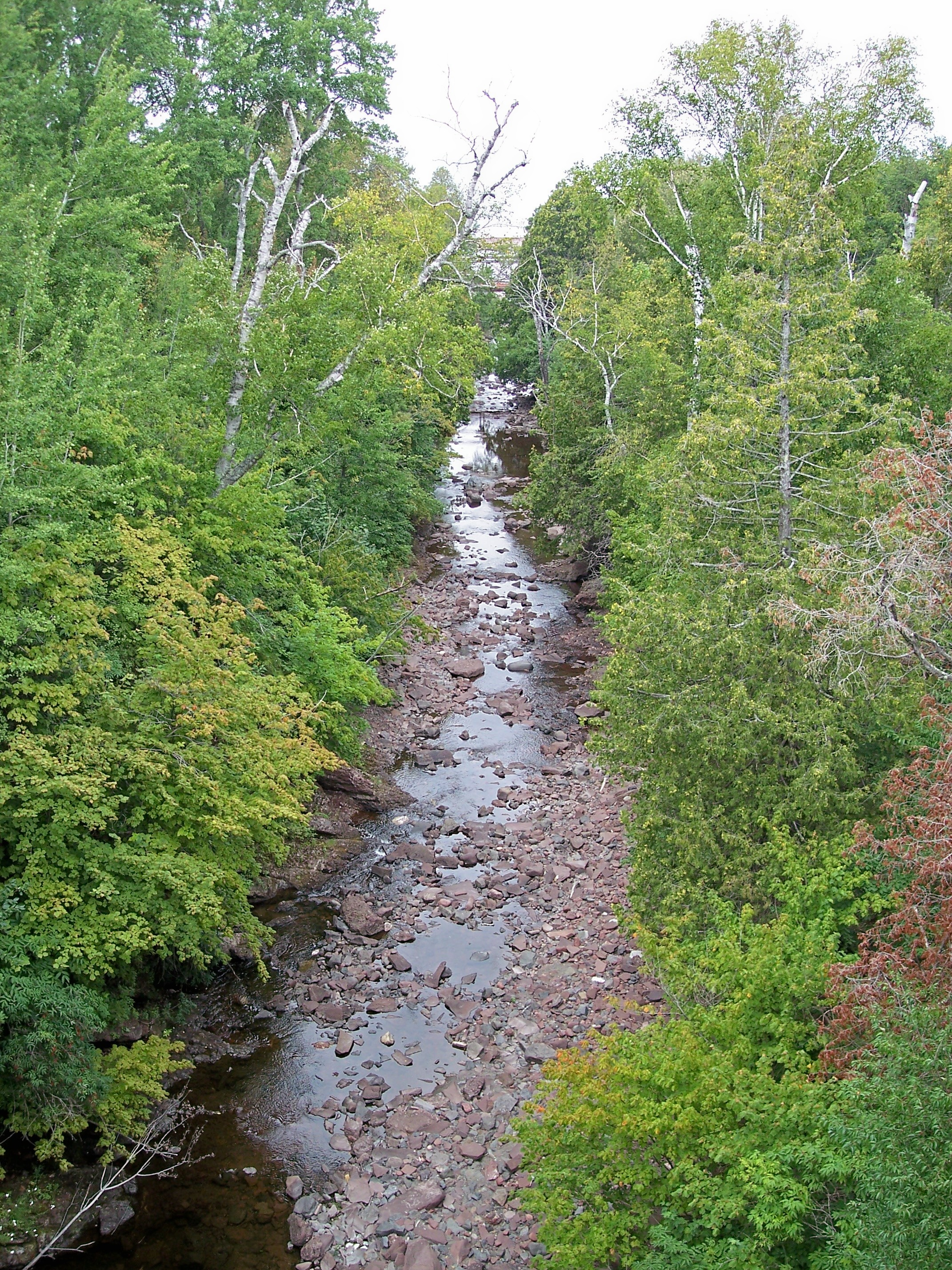
- The Eagle River near its mouth in the community of Eagle River

Location
- Country: United States

Physical characteristics
- Source
  - location: at the confluence of its East and West Forks
  - coordinates: 47°23′21″N 88°16′42″W
- Mouth
  - location: in Eagle River, Michigan, at Lake Superior
  - coordinates: 47°24′54″N 88°17′57″W

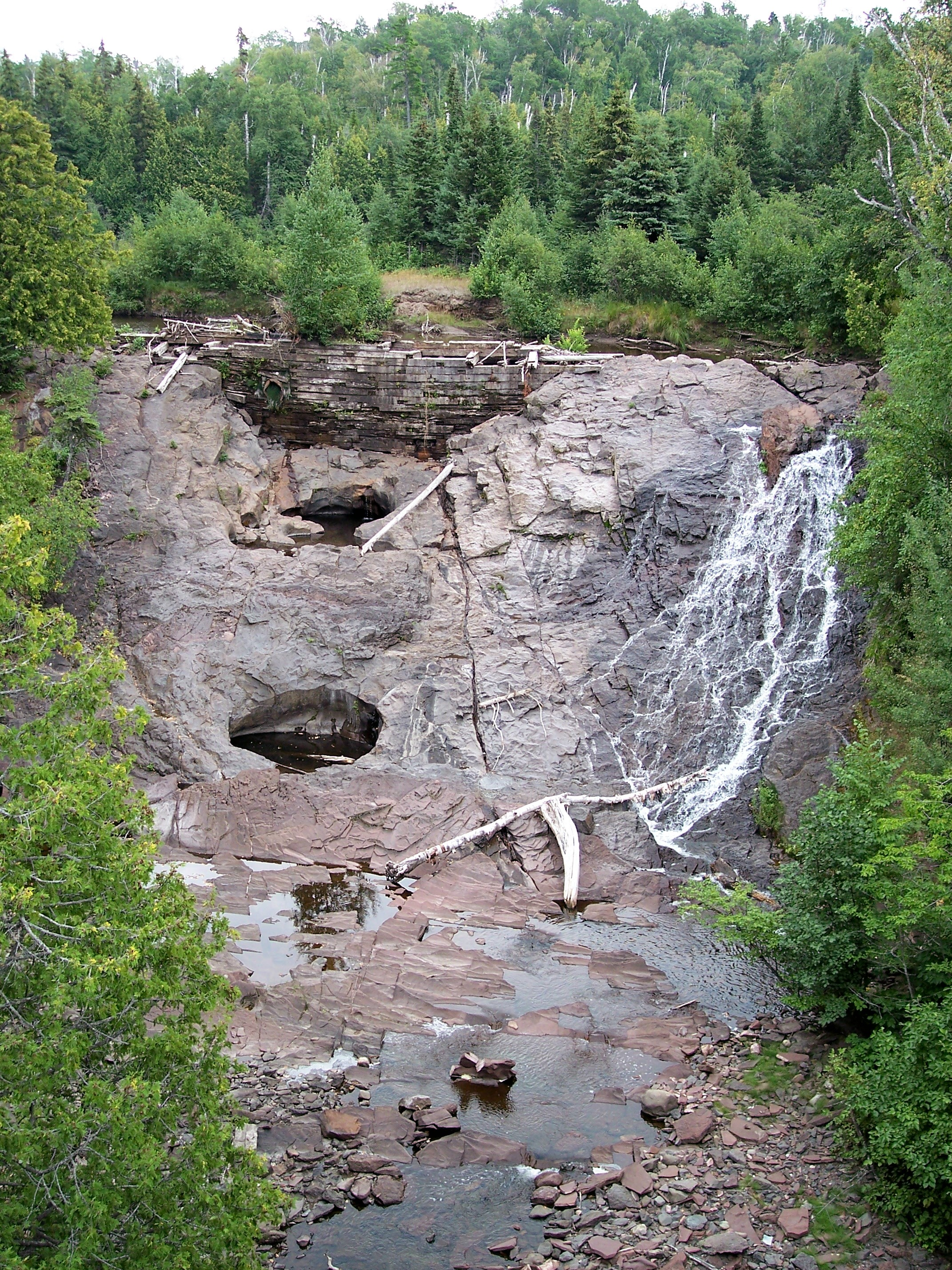
Near minimum flow

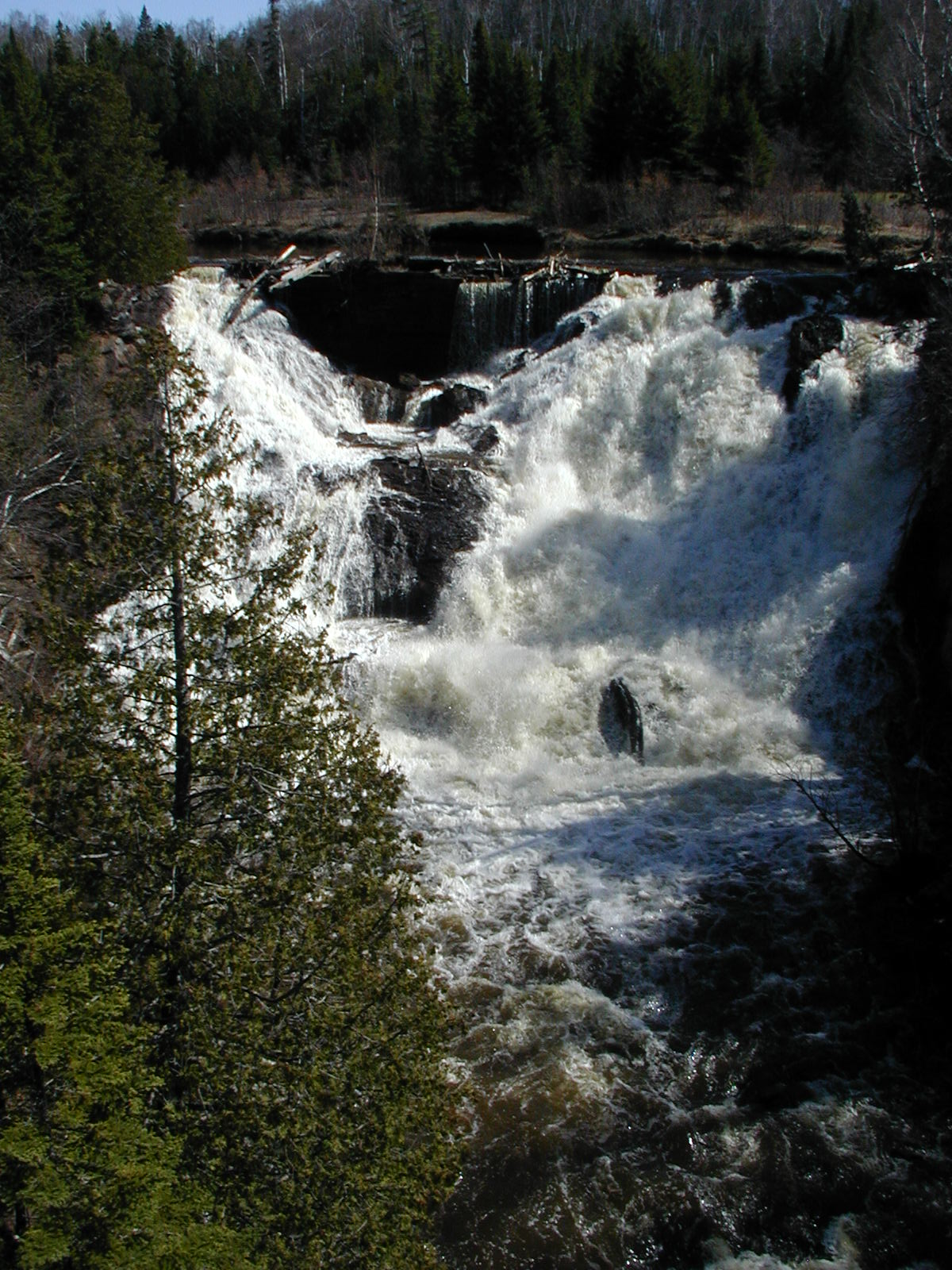
Near peak flow

Falls of the Eagle River in Eagle River

The Eagle River is a 2.6-mile-long (4.2 km) stream on the Keweenaw Peninsula of the U.S. state of Michigan. The river flows into Lake Superior in the community of Eagle River. Most of the river lies within Houghton Township.

The main branch of the river is formed at the confluence of its East Branch and its West Branch at the community of Phoenix, about two miles southeast of its mouth, and parallels M-26 from Phoenix into Eagle River.

The east and west branches each run along the south side of the Cliff Range to meet in Phoenix and flow through a gap in the Cliff Range. The west branch rises about three miles southwest of Phoenix in northeastern Allouez Township. Cliff Drive runs alongside the river, and is joined by U.S. Highway 41 and M-26 about a mile and a quarter southeast of Phoenix. The only significant tributary on the west branch is Brodie Creek, which rises a bit further inland from the Cliff Range and enters the west branch just outside Phoenix.

The east branch rises out of Beaver Pond about five miles east of Phoenix. It flows west along the south side of the Cliff Range, paralleled by US 41. The only significant tributary of the east branch is Buffalo Creek, which enters about three miles east of Phoenix.

== See also ==
- List of Michigan rivers
