= Twin Lakes State Park (Michigan) =

Park in Michigan, USA

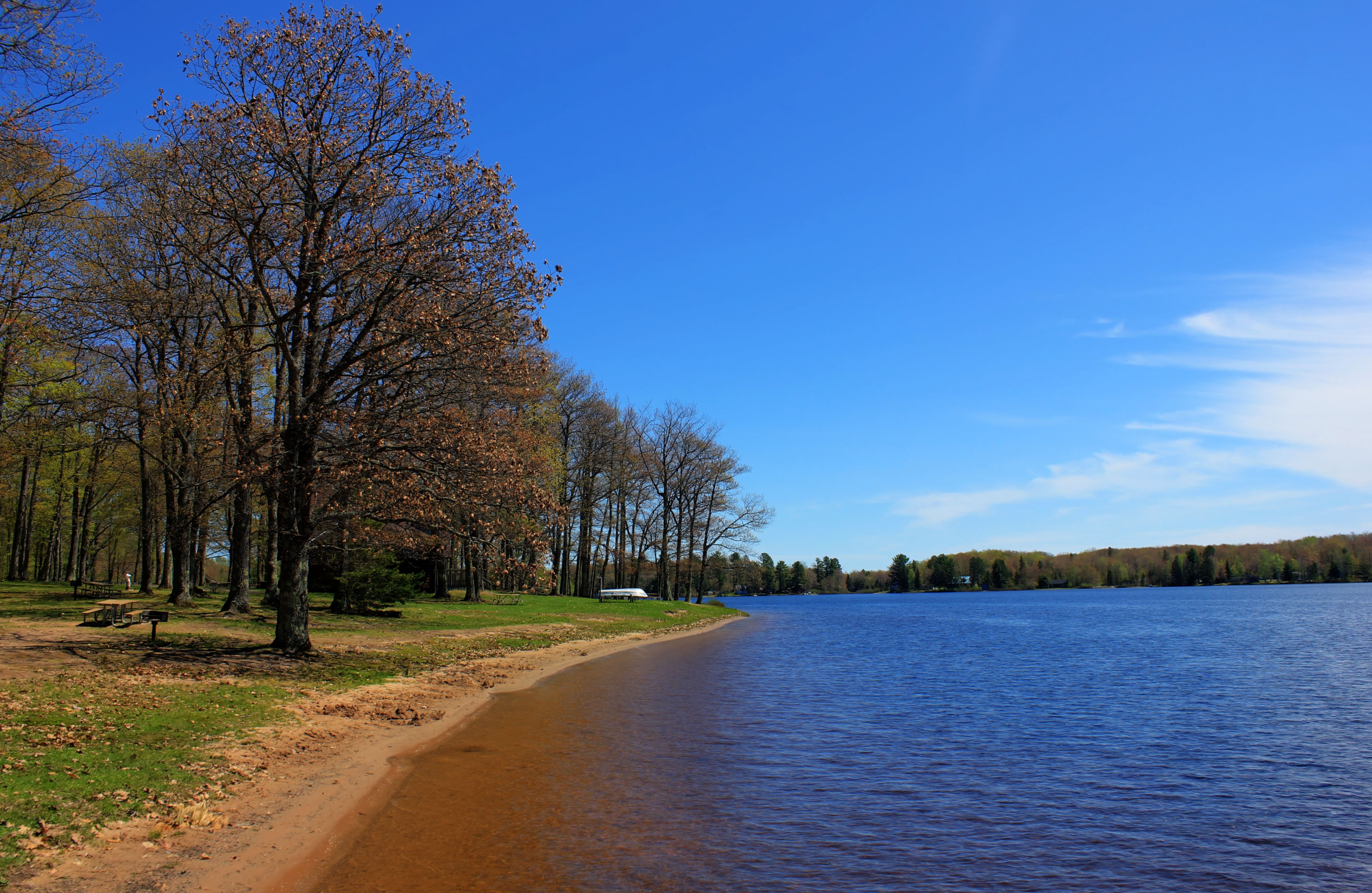
- Shore and lake

- Location within Michigan Location within the United States
- Location: Elm River Township, Houghton County, Michigan, United States
- Nearest city: Houghton, Michigan
- Coordinates: 46°53′24″N 88°51′28″W
- Area: 175 acres (71 ha)
- Elevation: 1,197 feet (365 m)
- Established: 1964
- Administrator: Michigan Department of Natural Resources
- Designation: Michigan state park
- Website: Official website

Twin Lakes State Park is a 175-acre (71 ha) state park on the western shore of Lake Roland in Houghton County, Michigan. It is located in the Elm River Township, Michigan along M-26.

== Activities and amenities ==
The park offers fishing, swimming, beach house, boat launch, campground and cabins, picnicking and playground areas, and 1.5 miles (2.4 km) of trails for hiking, snowmobiling and cross-country skiing.
