= Phoenix, Michigan =

- Unincorporated community
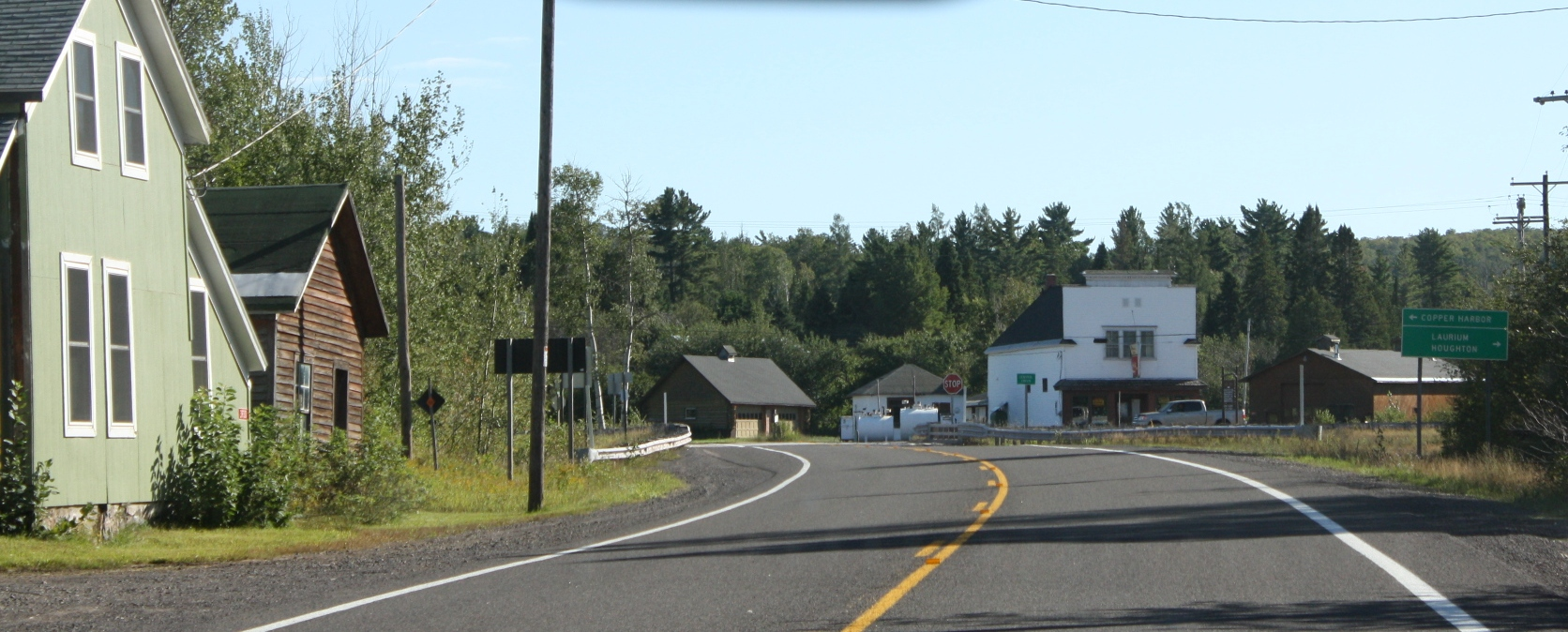
- Downtown Phoenix along M-26

- Location within the state of Michigan Phoenix (the United States)
- Coordinates: 47°23′20″N 88°16′39″W
- Country: United States
- State: Michigan
- County: Keweenaw
- Township: Houghton
- Elevation: 925 ft (282 m)
- Time zone: UTC-5 (Eastern (EST))
  - Summer (DST): UTC-4 (EDT)
- ZIP code(s): 49950 (Mohawk)
- Area code: 906
- GNIS feature ID: 634768

Phoenix is an unincorporated community in Keweenaw County, Michigan, United States. Phoenix lies at the junction of M-26 and U.S. Highway 41, approximately two miles (3.2 km) south of Eagle River, near the shores of Lake Superior.

Phoenix was the site of the Phoenix Mine, one of the earliest copper mines in the Keweenaw Peninsula. The Phoenix Copper Mining Company's predecessor, the Lake Superior Copper Company, was the first active copper mine in the Copper Country, established in the early 1840s. With the establishment of a religious presence and blacksmith shop in the 1800s—the Church of the Assumption and Bammert Blacksmith Shop—these surviving edifices have been preserved by the Keweenaw County Historical Society.
