= M-26 (Michigan highway) =

State highway in Michigan, United States

M-26
- M-26 highlighted in red

Route information
- Maintained by MDOT
- Length: 96.355 mi (155.068 km)
- Existed: c. July 1, 1919–present
- Tourist routes: Lake Superior Circle Tour

Major junctions
- South end: US 45 near Rockland
- M-38 near Greenland; US 41 in Calumet
- North end: US 41 at Copper Harbor

Location
- Country: United States
- State: Michigan
- Counties: Ontonagon, Houghton, Keweenaw

Highway system
- Michigan State Trunkline Highway System; Interstate; US; State; Byways
← M-25	→ US 27
← M-110	M-111	→ US 112
← M-205	M-206	→ M-208

M-26 is a 96.355-mile-long (155.068 km) state trunkline highway in the U.S. state of Michigan, running from two miles (3.2 km) east of Rockland to its junction with US Highway 41 (US 41) in Copper Harbor. It generally runs southwest-to-northeast in the western half or Michigan's Upper Peninsula. The northernmost segment, which closely parallels the shore of Lake Superior on the west side of the Keweenaw Peninsula, is highly scenic.

M-26 previously reached the Wisconsin border, but a section of the highway became US 45. Other changes on the northern end of M-26 incorporated highways that were previously numbered M-111 and M-206 in the Eagle Harbor and Eagle River area.

== Route description ==
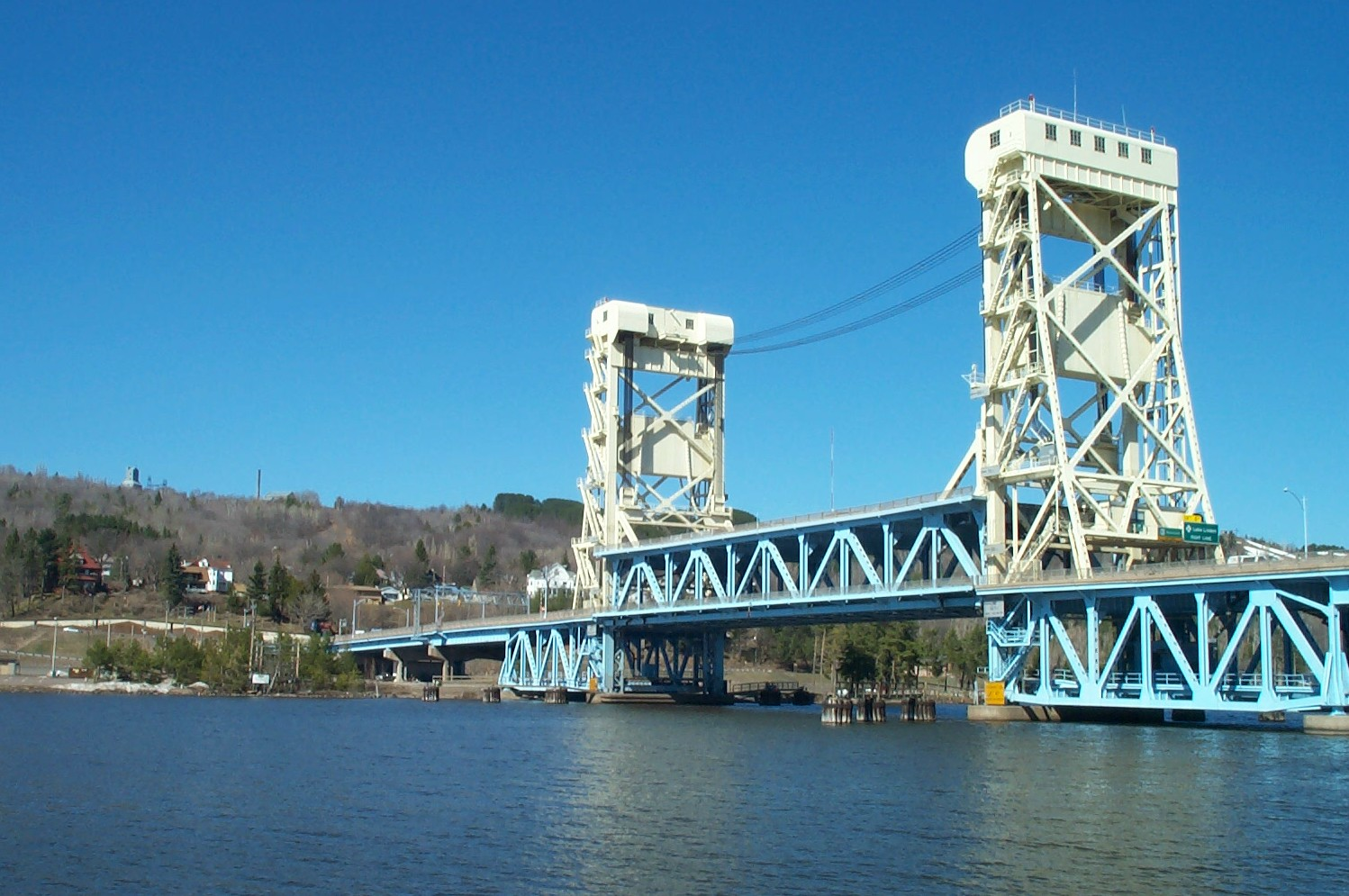
The Portage Lake Lift Bridge carries US 41/M-26 across the Keweenaw Waterway from Houghton to Hancock.

=== Southern terminus to Houghton ===
M-26 starts at an intersection with US 45 east of Rockland in Michigan's Ontonagon County. From there it runs through the town of Mass City to the junction with M-38 east of Greenland. The two highways join for a short distance before M-26 separates turning northeast to Winona across the Houghton County line. In Twin Lakes M-26 passes the shores of the namesake lakes and Twin Lakes State Park. M-26 passes through wooded, hilly terrain in western Houghton County. The segment of roadway in South Range was recently realigned to smooth out curves in the roadway. From there north, M-26 runs generally downhill on approaching the western business district of Houghton and the Portage Lake Lift Bridge from the west. It enters and runs through the middle of Dakota Heights before re-entering Houghton and continuing to approach the bridge.

=== Portage Lake Lift Bridge ===
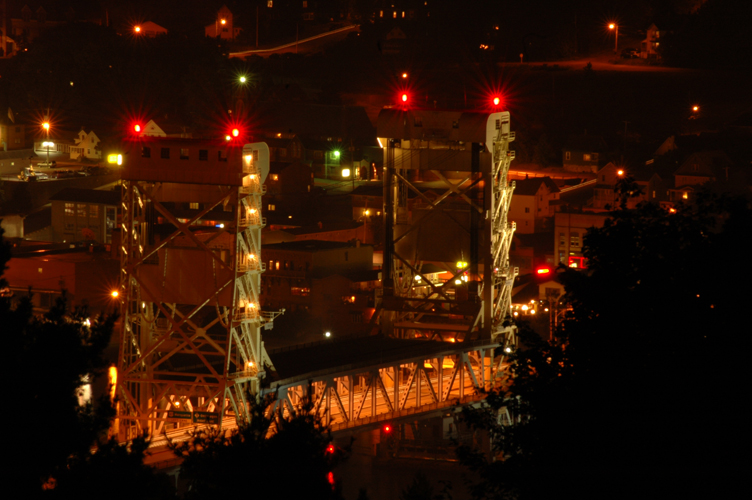
The Portage Lake Lift Bridge at night from north of Hancock, MI

The Portage Lake Lift Bridge connects the cities of Hancock and Houghton, Michigan by crossing over the Portage Waterway, an arm of Portage Lake which cuts across the Keweenaw Peninsula with a canal linking the final several miles to Lake Superior to the northwest.

As its name states, the bridge is a lift bridge with the middle section capable of being lifted from its low point of four feet clearance over the water to a clearance of thirty two feet to allow boats to pass underneath. The Portage Lake Lift Bridge is the widest and heaviest double decked vertical lift bridge in the world. The lower deck of the bridge was originally open to rail traffic, but this level is now closed to trains and is used in the winter for snowmobile traffic. Throughout the 1960s, 70s and 80s, the bridge was painted the same color as the Mackinac Bridge — cream and forest green — however, in the early 1990s, it was repainted in a cream and robins egg blue color scheme—exactly the same colors as the National Park Service's ship Ranger III—to some denoting Houghton as the "Gateway to Isle Royale".

=== Hancock to Copper Harbor ===
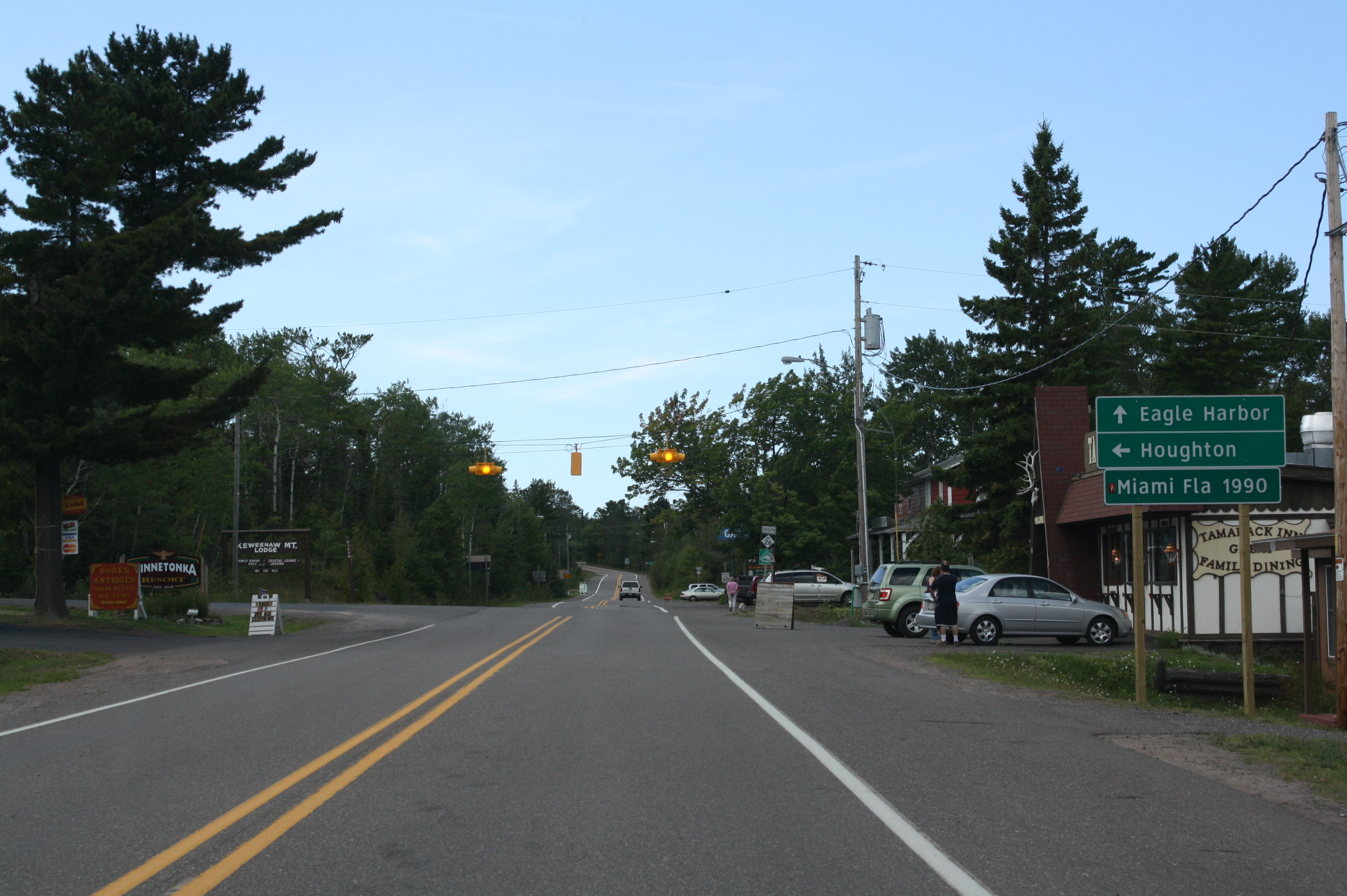
Northern terminus

On the north end of the bridge, M-26 turns east while US 41 turns west into Hancock. M-26 passes through Ripley at the base of the Mt. Ripley Ski Area before turning north to Dollar Bay on the shore of the heavy polluted Torch Lake. Next are the twin communities of Lake Linden and Hubbell. M-26 forms the main streets of these as it passes north from Hubbell into Lake Linden. The highway then runs back to the west to rejoin US 41 in Calumet. US 41/M-26 connects with the northern end of M-203 on the north side of town before heading out to Keweenaw County. In the town of Phoenix, M-26 separates from US 41 one last time, turning west for a stretch along the northern shoreline of the Keweenaw Peninsula. It passes through the communities of Eagle River (county seat of Keweenaw County) and Eagle Harbor.

M-26 in Eagle River crosses the namesake river on the glue-laminated Eagle River Timber Bridge. The 152-foot (46 m) bridge features two timber frame arches of 74 feet (23 m) and 79 feet (24 m) in length. The connecting work between the wood elements is steel. There are hinge points in the center of each arch. The deck is wood covered with an asphalt driving surface. Enough wood was used in construction to fabricate three or four average-sized homes. All the wood was pressure-treated, and the steel was galvanized and epoxy-coated. Reapplication of preservative and tightening bolts will be the routine maintenance required every three years.

Past Eagle Harbor, M-26 meets the highly scenic Brockway Mountain Drive. The northern terminus of M-26 is located in Copper Harbor. The terminus is just past the second intersection with Brockway Mountain Drive near the marina and the location of the Isle Royale Queen ferry to Isle Royale National Park.

== History ==
Before it was a state highway, many parts of the original route of M-26 were used as a military road, connecting Fort Wilkins at Copper Harbor with Fort Howard at Green Bay, Wisconsin. From 1919 until 1934, M-26 was routed southward to the Wisconsin state line to a connection with STH-26 along what is now US 45.

The original northern terminus of M-26 was in Laurium at M-15 (now US 41); it was extended by 1927 along US 41 to Mohawk and then replacing M-83 to Gay. This extension would be reversed in 1933 when the Mohawk to Gay routing was turned over to Keweenaw County control. A second extension in 1935 along US 41 to Phoenix replaced M-129 between Phoenix and Eagle Harbor. At this time, M-206 was designated from M-26 to the Eagle Harbor light house. A rerouting of M-26 in November 1940 moved it between Phoenix and Eagle River, replacing M-111. The segment between Phoenix and Eagle River along Copper Falls Mine Road was turned over to Keweenaw County at this time.

In 1979, M-26 was rerouted through Dakota Heights, bisecting it. Park Avenue had formerly served as the main route from Houghton to Atlantic Mine, but this was replaced by the new route of the highway.

The Lake Shore Drive Bridge, which had carried M-26 over the Eagle River, was relegated to pedestrian use in 1990 after the adjacent Eagle River Timber Bridge opened for traffic.

In 2006, the Michigan Department of Transportation (MDOT) opened a bypass around the southwest and southern edge of South Range in order to provide a safer route through the town. As of 4 October 2006, MDOT has transferred jurisdiction of the necessary pieces of roadway to complete the M-26 bypass of South Range.

=== M-111 ===

After 1938, the M-111 designation was given to an old M-6 routing in the Keweenaw Peninsula that ran between Eagle River and Phoenix along what is, now, modern-day M-26 parallel to Eagle River. That incarnation lasted two years until M-111 was deleted and M-26 was realigned over it. The M-111 designation has not been used since being deleted in 1940.

=== M-206 ===

M-206 was a state highway that served as a spur route from M-26 into Eagle Harbor and the Eagle Harbor Lighthouse in Keweenaw County in 1935.

== Major intersections ==
County	Location	mi	km	Destinations	Notes
Ontonagon	Rockland	0.000	0.000	US 45 – Ontonagon, Bruce Crossing, Watersmeet	
Ontonagon	Greenland	5.518	8.880	M-38 west / LSCT west – Ontonagon	Western end of M-38 concurrency; the LSCT designation joins M-26
Ontonagon	Greenland	6.615	10.646	M-38 east – Baraga	Eastern end of M-38 concurrency
Houghton	Houghton	43.468	69.955	US 41 south (Portage Lake Lift Bridge) / LSCT – Marquette	Southern end of US 41 concurrency on the bridge over the Portage Canal
Houghton	Hancock	43.744	70.399	US 41 / LSCT north – Hancock	Northern end of US 41 and LSCT concurrencies
Houghton	Calumet	58.307	93.836	US 41 south / LSCT south – Houghton	Southern end of US 41 and LSCT concurrencies
Houghton	Calumet	59.373	95.552	M-203 south – McLain State Park	
Keweenaw	Phoenix	72.432	116.568	US 41 north / LSCT north – Copper Harbor	Northern end of US 41 concurrency; a loop route of the LSCT branches off to follow M-26
Keweenaw	Eagle Harbor Township	86.977	139.976	Brockway Mountain Drive east	Western terminus of Brockway Mountain Drive
Keweenaw	Copper Harbor	95.925	154.376	Brockway Mountain Drive west	Eastern terminus of Brockway Mountain Drive
Keweenaw	Copper Harbor	96.355	155.068	US 41 / LSCT – Houghton, Fort Wilkins Historic State Park	LSCT loop route rejoins main branch
1.000 mi = 1.609 km; 1.000 km = 0.621 mi: Concurrency terminus
