= Houghton Township, Michigan =

- Civil township
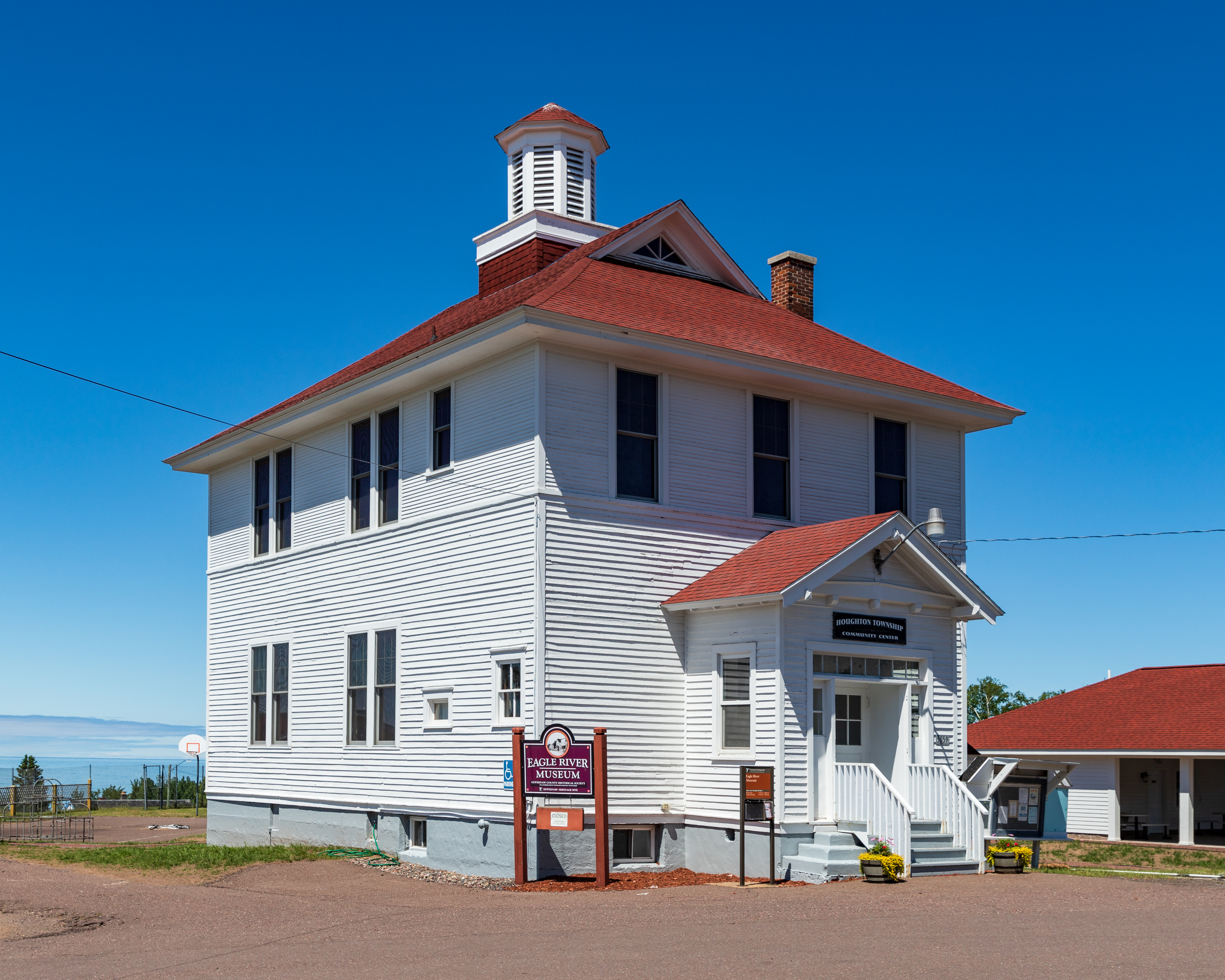
- Houghton Township Community Center

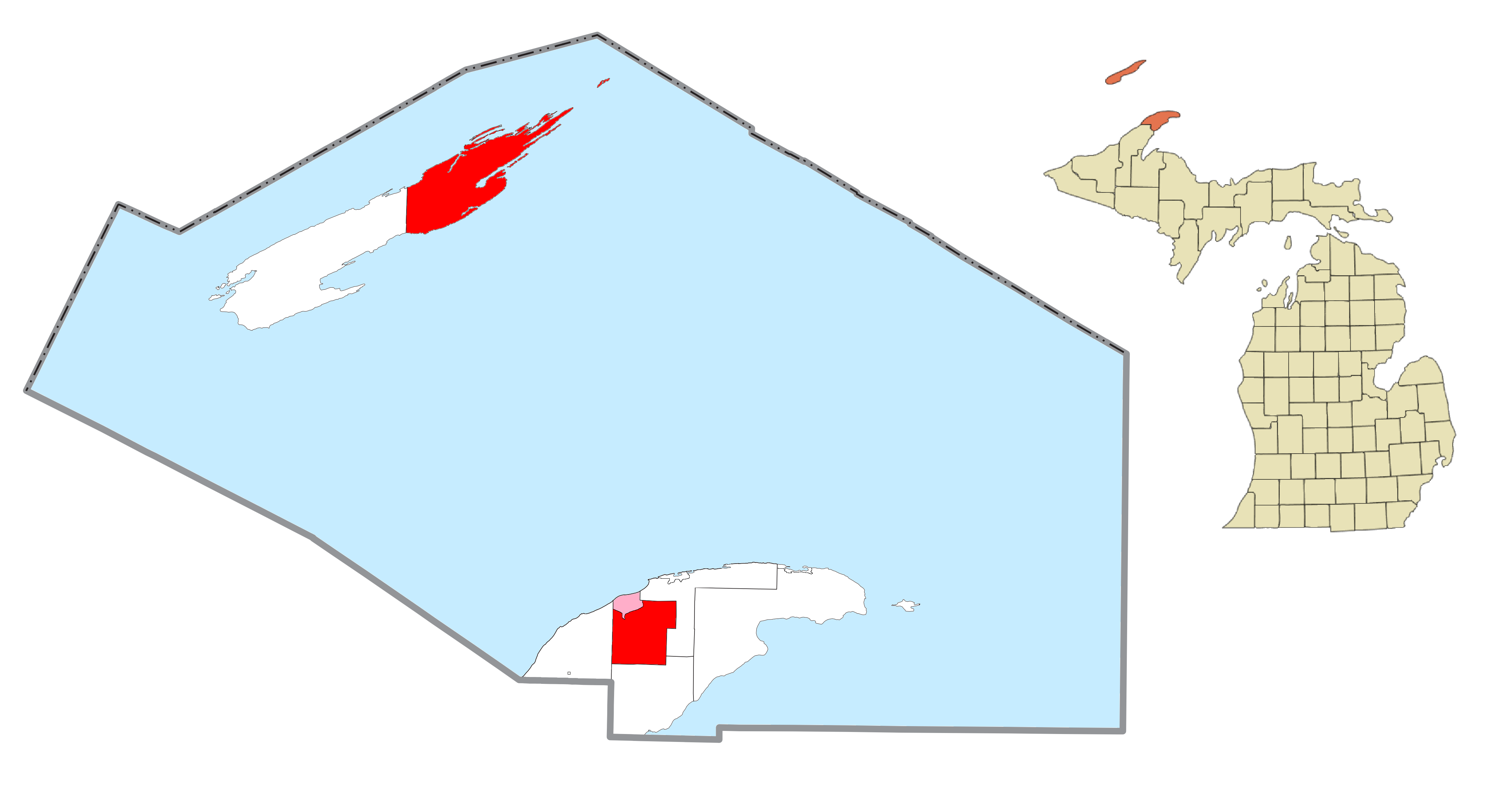
- Location within Keweenaw County (red) and the administered CDP of Eagle River (pink)

- Location within the state of Michigan Location within the state of Michigan
- Coordinates: 47°24′59″N 88°17′44″W
- Country: United States
- State: Michigan
- County: Keweenaw
- Established: 1861

Government
  - Supervisor: Robby Fischer
  - Clerk: Linda Paradiso
  - Treasurer: Julie Hamilton

Area
  - Total: 517.42 sq mi (1,340.11 km^{2})
  - Land: 120.72 sq mi (312.66 km^{2})
  - Water: 396.70 sq mi (1,027.45 km^{2})
- Elevation: 630 ft (192 m)

Population (2020)
  - Total: 72
  - Density: 0.85/sq mi (0.33/km^{2})
- Time zone: UTC-5 (Eastern (EST))
  - Summer (DST): UTC-4 (EDT)
- ZIP code(s): 49931 (Houghton) (Note: The Houghton 49931 ZIP Code is used exclusively for post office box services to Isle Royale National Park.); 49950 (Mohawk)
- Area code: 906
- FIPS code: 26-39380
- GNIS feature ID: 1626493
- Website: Official website

Houghton Township is a civil township of Keweenaw County in the U.S. state of Michigan. The population was 72 at the 2020 census.

The township consists of a mainland portion of the Keweenaw Peninsula and the county seat of Eagle River, as well as the unpopulated northeast portion of Isle Royale National Park.

== Geography ==
According to the U.S. Census Bureau, the township has a total area of 517.42 square miles (1,340.11 km^{2}), of which 120.72 square miles (312.66 km^{2}) is land and 396.70 square miles (1,027.45 km^{2}) (76.67%) is water.

Due to its surrounding water boundaries, it ranks as the third-largest municipality by total area after McMillan Township and Eagle Harbor Township, although Houghton Township has the largest water boundaries of any municipalities in the state.

=== Major highways ===
- US 41 runs west–east through the central portion of the township.
- M-26 enters the township concurrently with US 41 until it branches off to the north in Phoenix.

=== Communities ===
- Central is an unincorporated community located within the township at 47°24′26″N 88°12′02″W. This settlement developed around the successful Central Mine, which began operating in 1854. A post office named Central Mine opened on December 8, 1871, in what was then part of Sherman Township, as seen in an 1873 map of Keweenaw County. The name changed to Centralmine on June 30, 1894, and was disestablished on September 15, 1904. The mine itself closed in 1894.
- Eagle Nest is an unincorporated community located just southeast of Eagle River at 47°24′27″N 88°16′39″W.
- Eagle River is an unincorporated community and census-designated place located along Lake Superior at 47°24′50″N 88°17′44″W. It is also the county seat of Keweenaw County.
- Phoenix is an unincorporated community located at the junction of U.S. Route 41 and M-26 at 47°23′20″N 88°16′39″W.
- Rock Harbor Lodge is a seasonal unincorporated community located on Isle Royale at 48°08′45″N 88°29′01″W. It is the main access point for visitors to the national park and is also the northernmost community in the state, although it is uninhabited during the colder months.
- Vaughsville is an unincorporated community located in the western portion of the township along US 41 / M-27 at 47°22′53″N 88°17′45″W. The area was first settled by Joel Vaugh, who bought land here in 1849. He platted the village, but the settlement dwindled following his death in 1862.

== Demographics ==
=== 2020 census ===
As of the 2020 census, there were 72 people, 41 households, and 27 families in the township. In 2020, the racial makeup of the township was 97.22% white, and 2.78% from two or more races. Hispanic or Latinos of any race were 0.00% of the population.

=== 2000 census ===
At the 2000 United States census, there were 204 people, 45 households, and 26 families in the township. The population density was 1.7 per square mile (0.6/km^{2}). There were 273 housing units at an average density of 2.2 per square mile (0.9/km^{2}). By the 2020 census, its population declined to 72.

In 2000, the racial makeup of the township was 58.33% white, 36.76% African American, 0.98% Native American, 0.49% Asian, 0.98% from other races, and 2.45% from two or more races. Hispanic or Latinos of any race were 4.90% of the population. Among its population at the time, 16.5% were of Finnish, 10.6% English, 9.4% Irish, 8.8% Italian, 6.5% German and 5.3% Norwegian ancestry.

At the 2000 census, there were 45 households, out of which 13.3% had children under the age of 18 living with them, 51.1% were married couples living together, 6.7% had a female householder with no husband present, and 42.2% were non-families. 42.2% of all households were made up of individuals, and 17.8% had someone living alone who was 65 years of age or older. The average household size was 1.89 and the average family size was 2.54. The median income for a household in the township was $28,750, and the median income for a family was $41,250. Males had a median income of $32,500 versus $21,875 for females. The per capita income for the township was $8,505. None of the families and 7.0% of the population were living below the poverty line, including no under eighteens and 9.1% of those over 64. At the 2021 American Community Survey, its median household income increased to $51,250.
