= Eagle River, Michigan =

- Census-designated place (CDP) and unincorporated community
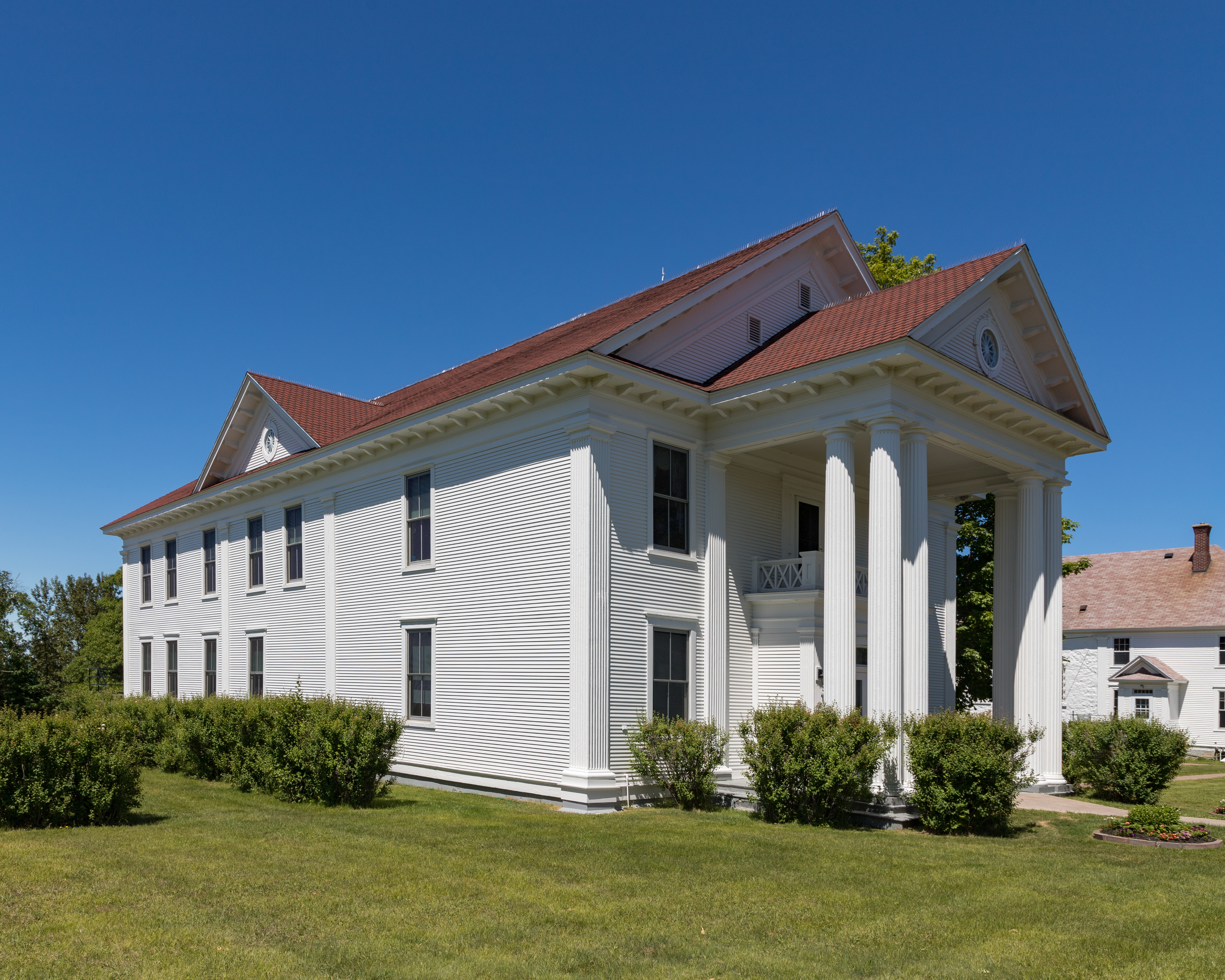
- Keweenaw County Courthouse in Eagle River

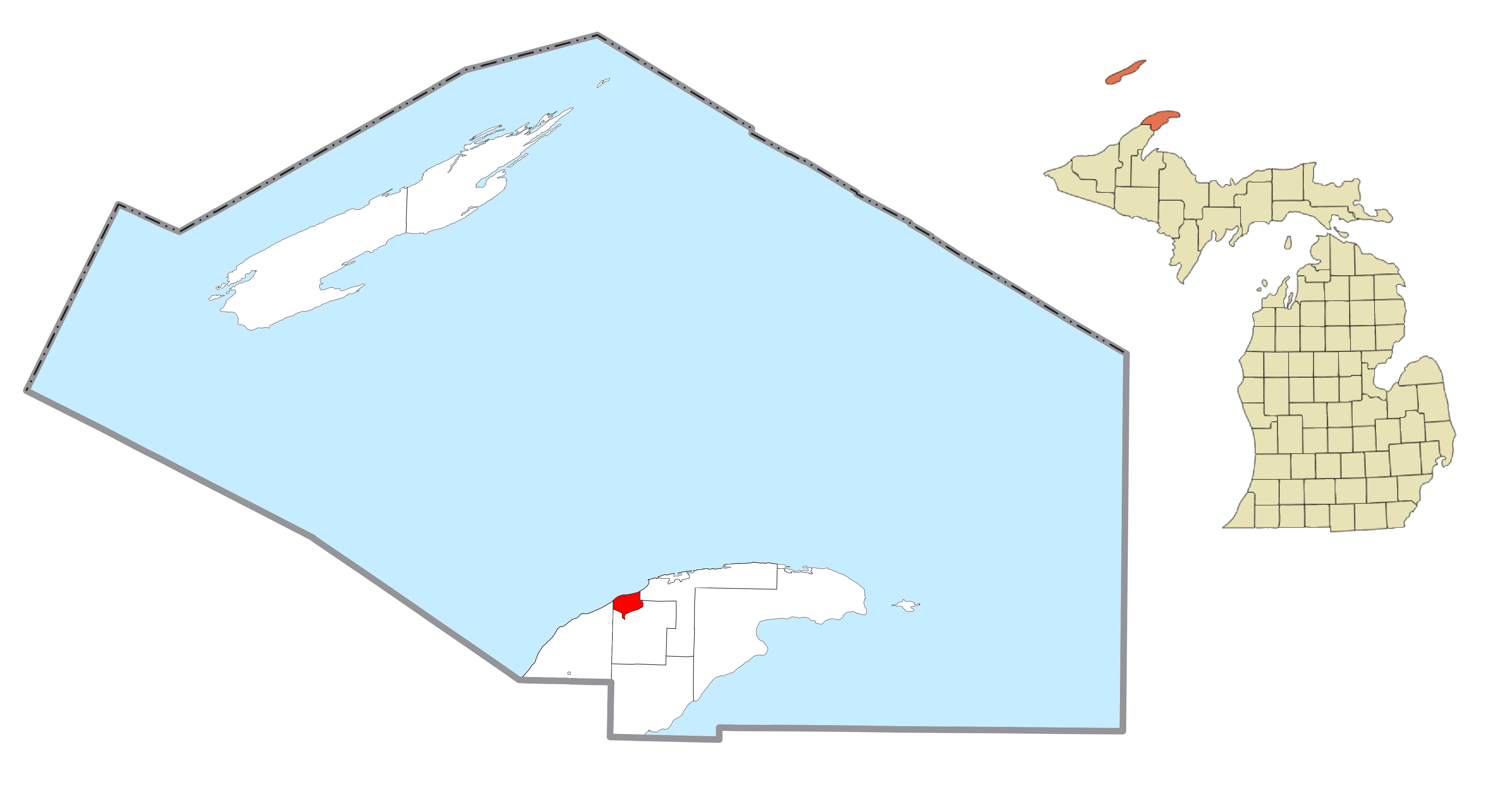
- Location within Keweenaw County

- Location within the state of Michigan Location within the United States
- Coordinates: 47°24′50″N 88°17′44″W
- Country: United States
- State: Michigan
- County: Keweenaw
- Townships: Allouez and Houghton

Area
  - Total: 6.22 sq mi (16.12 km^{2})
  - Land: 6.20 sq mi (16.07 km^{2})
  - Water: 0.019 sq mi (0.05 km^{2})
- Elevation: 650 ft (200 m)

Population (2020)
  - Total: 65
  - Density: 10.5/sq mi (4.05/km^{2})
- Time zone: UTC-5 (Eastern (EST))
  - Summer (DST): UTC-4 (EDT)
- ZIP code(s): 49950 (Mohawk)
- Area code: 906
- GNIS feature ID: 625096

Eagle River is an unincorporated community and census-designated place (CDP) in the U.S. state of Michigan. It is the county seat of Keweenaw County. Its population was 65 at the 2020 census, which makes it by far the least-populated county seat in the state of Michigan. As an unincorporated community, Eagle River has no legal autonomy and is part of Allouez Township and Houghton Township.

== History ==
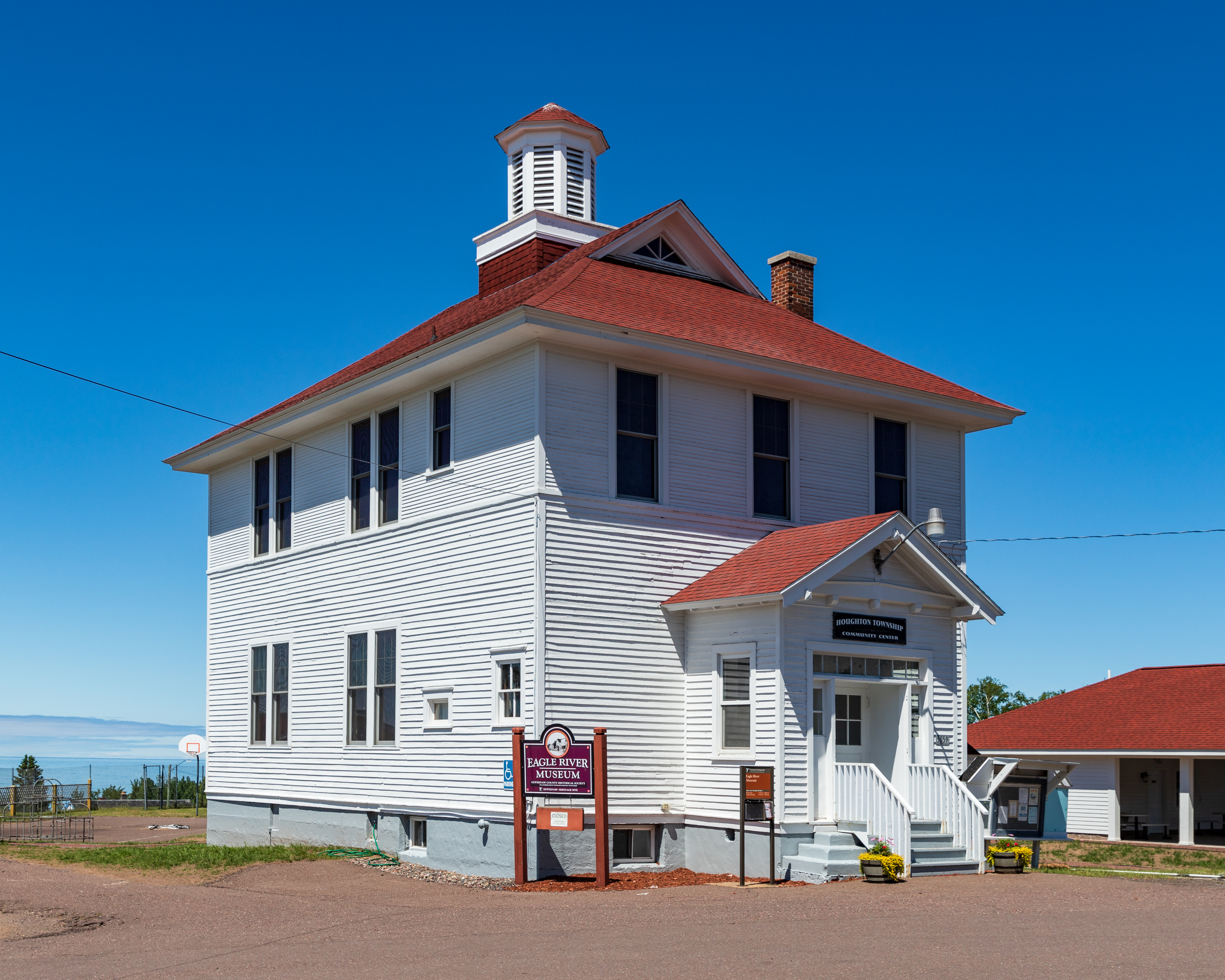
The Houghton Township Community Center in Eagle River

Eagle River was a boom town of the copper mining era in the Keweenaw. Copper was discovered in 1845 at the Cliff Range nearby, the so-called "Cliff Lode". The land of the Eagle River community had been leased by the Keweenaw Copper Company in 1843. It was later platted by the Phoenix Company and sold as individual lots. The first postmaster was named on October 24, 1845. It was part of Houghton County until Keweenaw County was organized in 1861. The profitability of the area's copper mines had begun to decline sharply by around 1870.

The Eagle River Timber Bridge is a wooden arch bridge that carries highway M-26 over the Eagle River. It opened in 1990 as a replacement for the historic Lake Shore Drive Bridge that runs parallel to it.

Eagle River is home to the Holy Transfiguration Skete, a Byzantine Catholic monastery and community, which is known for producing jams and other foodstuffs from berries collected in the nearby forests. Holy Transfiguration is one of only a few Byzantine Catholic monasteries in the United States.

The community of Eagle River was listed as a newly-organized census-designated place for the 2010 census, meaning it now has officially defined boundaries and population statistics for the first time.

== Geography ==
According to the United States Census Bureau, Eagle River has a total area of 5.96 square miles (15.44 km^{2}), of which 5.94 square miles (15.38 km^{2}) is land and 0.02 square miles (0.05 km^{2}) (0.34%) is water.

Eagle River is listed as being part of both Allouez Township and Houghton Township. Only a very small portion of 0.01 square miles (0.03 km^{2}) and no residents are within the Allouez Township portion of the community, while the majority of land and all residents are within Houghton Township.

The community is on M-26 on the north side of the Keweenaw Peninsula on the shores of Lake Superior. It is about 27 miles (43 km) northeast of Houghton and is situated on the mouth of the Eagle River. The Mohawk 49950 ZIP Code serves the community.

The decommissioned Eagle River Light is on the west bank of the river on a sand bluff overlooking Lake Superior, although the view is partially obscured by condominiums.

== Demographics ==
As of 2020, its population was 65. Its median household income was $57,500.

Historical population
Census	Pop.	Note	%±
2020	65		—
U.S. Decennial Census

== Transportation ==
- US 41
- M-26

== Notable people ==
- Edward Thomas Abrams (1860–1918), doctor and legislator
