= SS Chester A. Congdon =

American Great Lakes freighter 1907-1918

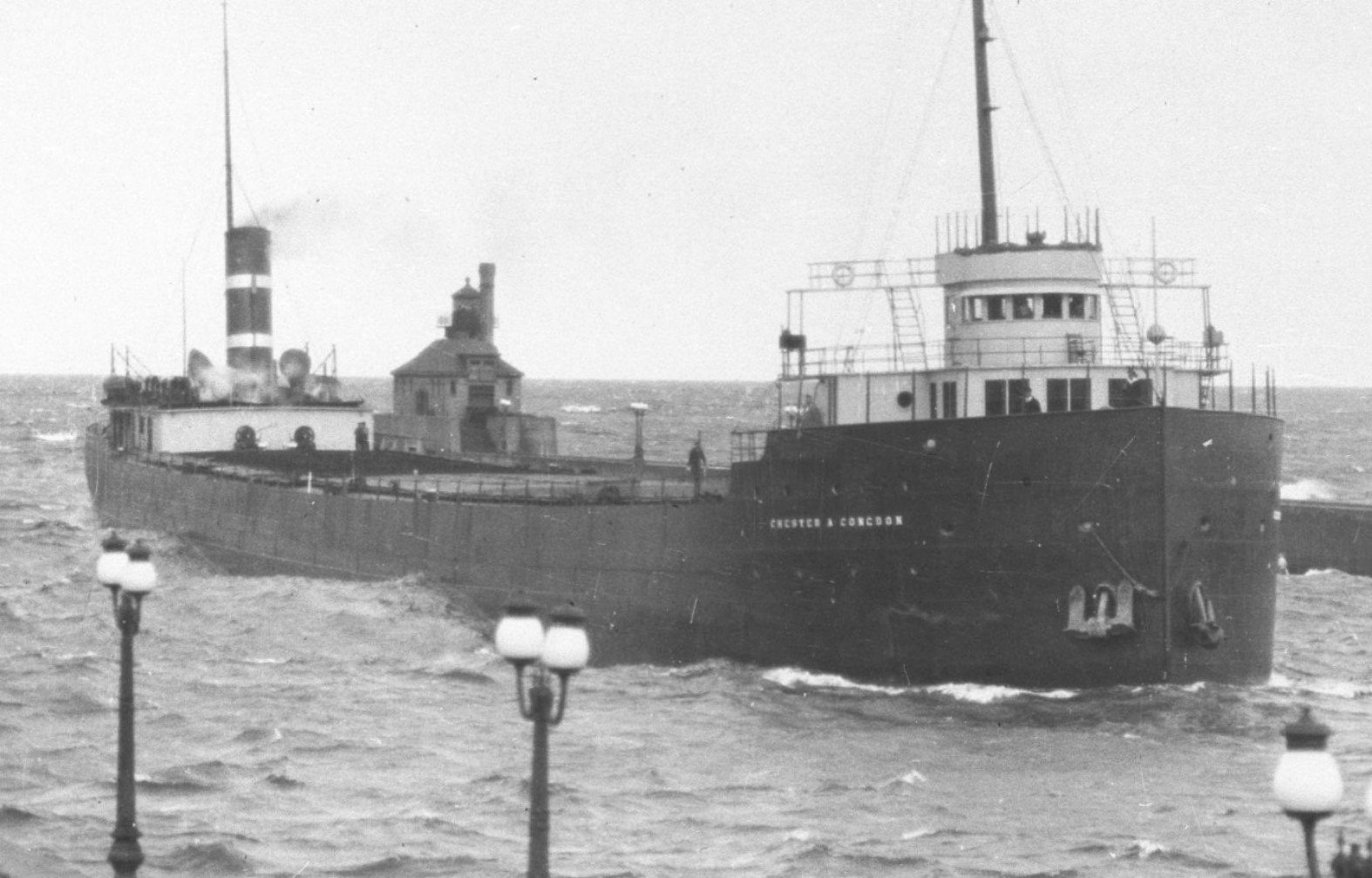
- Chester A. Congdon in the Duluth Ship Canal

History

United States
- Name: Salt Lake City (1907–1912); Chester A. Congdon (1912–1918)
- Namesake: Salt Lake City, Utah (1907–1912); Chester Adgate Congdon (1912–1918)
- Operator: Holmes Steamship Company (1907–1911); Acme Transit Company (1911–1912); Continental Steamship Company (1912–1918)
- Port of registry: Fairport, Ohio (1907–1912); Duluth, Minnesota (1912–1918)
- Builder: Chicago Shipbuilding Company, South Chicago, Illinois
- Yard number: 74
- Launched: 29 August 1907
- Christened: Dorothy Holmes
- Maiden voyage: 19 September 1907
- Out of service: 6 November 1918
- Identification: US official number 204526
- Fate: Sank on Lake Superior

General characteristics
- Class & type: Lake freighter
- Tonnage: 6,530 GRT; 4,843 NRT
- Length: 552 feet (168.2 m) LOA; 532 feet (162.2 m) LBP
- Beam: 56.16 feet (17.1 m)
- Depth: 26.42 feet (8.1 m)
- Installed power: Engine: 1 × 1,765 hp (1,316 kW) triple expansion steam engine; Boilers: 2 × Scotch marine boilers
- Propulsion: 1 × fixed pitch propeller
- Capacity: 10,200 long tons (10,364 t)

National Register of Historic Places data
Chester A. Congdon
U.S. National Register of Historic Places
Location within Michigan Location within the United States
| Location | Congdon Shoals, northeast end of Isle Royale National Park, Michigan |
| Coordinates | 48°11′36″N 88°30′52″W |
| Built | 1907 |
| Architect | Chicago Shipbuilding Company |
| Architectural style | Freighter |
| MPS | Shipwrecks of Isle Royale National Park TR |
| NRHP reference No. | 84001716 |
| Added to NRHP | 14 June 1984 |

SS Chester A. Congdon was an American lake freighter in service between 1907 and 1918. She was built under the name Salt Lake City in 1907 by the Chicago Shipbuilding Company of South Chicago, Illinois, for the Holmes Steamship Company, and was intended to be used in the grain trade on the Great Lakes. She entered service on 19 September 1907, when she made her maiden voyage. In 1911, Salt Lake City was sold to the Acme Transit Company. A year later, she was transferred to the Continental Steamship Company, and was renamed Chester A. Congdon, after lawyer and entrepreneur Chester Adgate Congdon. She was involved in several accidents throughout her career.

At 02:28 (EST) on 6 November 1918, Chester A. Congdon left Fort William, Ontario, under the command of Captain Charles J. Autterson, loaded with 380,000 bushels of wheat bound for Port McNicoll, Ontario. At 04:00, shortly after leaving the shelter of Thunder Bay, Chester A. Congdon encountered a heavy storm. Captain Autterson decided to return, and anchored in Thunder Bay until 10:15 a.m. when Chester A. Congdon headed back to open water. Shortly after she passed Thunder Cape, a thick fog descended on Lake Superior. She ran aground on the southern end of Canoe Rocks, on the northeast point of Isle Royale at 13:08 p.m. The first mate travelled to Fort William to deliver the news of the grounding. On November 8, a storm halted salvage operations, and broke Chester A. Congdon in two. She was the largest financial loss on the Great Lakes up to that point.

The wreck of Chester A. Congdon is the largest shipwreck of Isle Royale. It rests mostly intact in two pieces, with the bow on the south side of the reef now known as Congdon Shoal in 60–120 feet (18.3–36.6 m) of water, and the stern on the north side in 20–210 feet (6.1–64.0 m) of water. The wreck was listed on the National Register of Historic Places on June 14, 1984, and has become a popular site for recreational divers.

== History ==
=== Background ===
In 1843, the gunship USS Michigan became the first iron-hulled vessel built on the Great Lakes upon her launching in Erie, Pennsylvania. Though Canadian merchants were importing iron vessels prefabricated in the United Kingdom by the mid-1840s, the first regionally produced iron-hulled merchant vessel, Merchant, would not be built until 1862. Despite Merchant's clear success proving the potential of iron hulls, ships built from wood remained preferable until the 1880s due to their lower cost, as well as the abundance of high-quality timber and workers trained in carpentry. Between the early 1870s and the mid-1880s, shipyards around the Great Lakes began to construct iron ships on a relatively large scale.

In 1884, the first steel freighters were built on the Great Lakes, with metal becoming a material used in the construction of new hulls by the 1890s. Rapidly decreasing steel prices, combined with the development of the pneumatic rivet gun and the advancement of gantry cranes enabling shipyard employees to work at an increased speed and with greater efficiency, contributed to the rapid increase in the size of lake freighters in the late 19th and early 20th centuries.

Throughout the 1880s, the iron ore trade on the Great Lakes grew quickly, primarily due to the increasing size of the lake freighters and the rise in the number of trips they made to the ore docks of Lake Superior. With the railways unable to keep up with the rapid extraction of iron ore, bulk freighters became an integral component in the region's iron ore industry. By 1890, 57% of the 16,000,000 long tons (16,256,751 t) of the iron ore produced by mines in the United States was sourced from the region surrounding Lake Superior.

=== Design and construction ===
Salt Lake City (US official number 204526) was built in South Chicago, Illinois, in 1907 by the Chicago Shipbuilding Company. She was launched into the Calumet River on 29 August 1907, as hull 74. She was built for W. A. and H. B. Hawgood's Holmes Steamship Company of Cleveland, Ohio, and was christened by Dorothy Holmes. Salt Lake City was the third last ship of the so-called "10,000-ton capacity class". (Note: Other ships built to the same design as Salt Lake City included D. R. Hanna, Henry A. Hawgood, Sheldon Parks, J. Q. Riddle, Ward Ames, Matthew Andrews, H. P. Bope, Jay C. Morse, J. J. Sullivan, William A. Hawgood and W. R. Woodford, the last two of which succeeded her in construction.) She set the record for the fastest completion of a ship between its launching and maiden voyage at a Great Lakes shipyard. Salt Lake City was built for use in the grain trade on the Great Lakes.

Built with an arched frame system designed to create an unobstructed cargo hold, Salt Lake City was equipped with 32 telescoping hatch covers. The hatches were 9 feet (2.7 m) wide, and were placed on 12 feet (3.7 m) centers. Salt Lake City had a cargo capacity of 10,200 long tons (10,364 t). Her cargo hold was divided into three separate compartments, which had capacities of 3,700 long tons (3,759 t), 3,100 long tons (3,150 t) and 3,400 long tons (3,455 t). Salt Lake City was fitted with side-ballast tanks located between the hull plating and the cargo hold beneath the deck arches.

The hull of Salt Lake City had an overall length of 552 feet (168.2 m), and a length between perpendiculars of 532 feet (162.2 m). Her hull was 56 feet (17.1 m) in beam, and 31 feet (9.4 m) deep. (Note: Some sources list her beam as 56.16 feet (17.1 m) or 56.2 feet (17.1 m); and depth as 26 feet (7.9 m), 26.42 feet (8.1 m), 26.5 feet (8.1 m) or 27 feet (8.2 m).) Her tonnage was calculated as 6,530 gross register tons, and 4,843 tons net register tons. (Note: One source lists her gross register tonnage as 6,371.39 tons.)

She was powered by a 1,765 hp (1,316 kW) 83 rpm triple expansion steam engine; the cylinders of the engine were 23.5 inches (59.7 cm), 38 inches (96.5 cm) and 63 inches (160.0 cm) in diameter, and had a stroke of 42 inches (106.7 cm). Steam for the engine was provided by two coal-fired, induced-draft 180 pounds per square inch (1,200 kPa) Scotch marine boilers, 14.5 feet (4.4 m) in diameter, and 11.5 feet (3.5 m) long. The engine and boilers were both built by the American Shipbuilding Company in Cleveland.

=== Service history ===
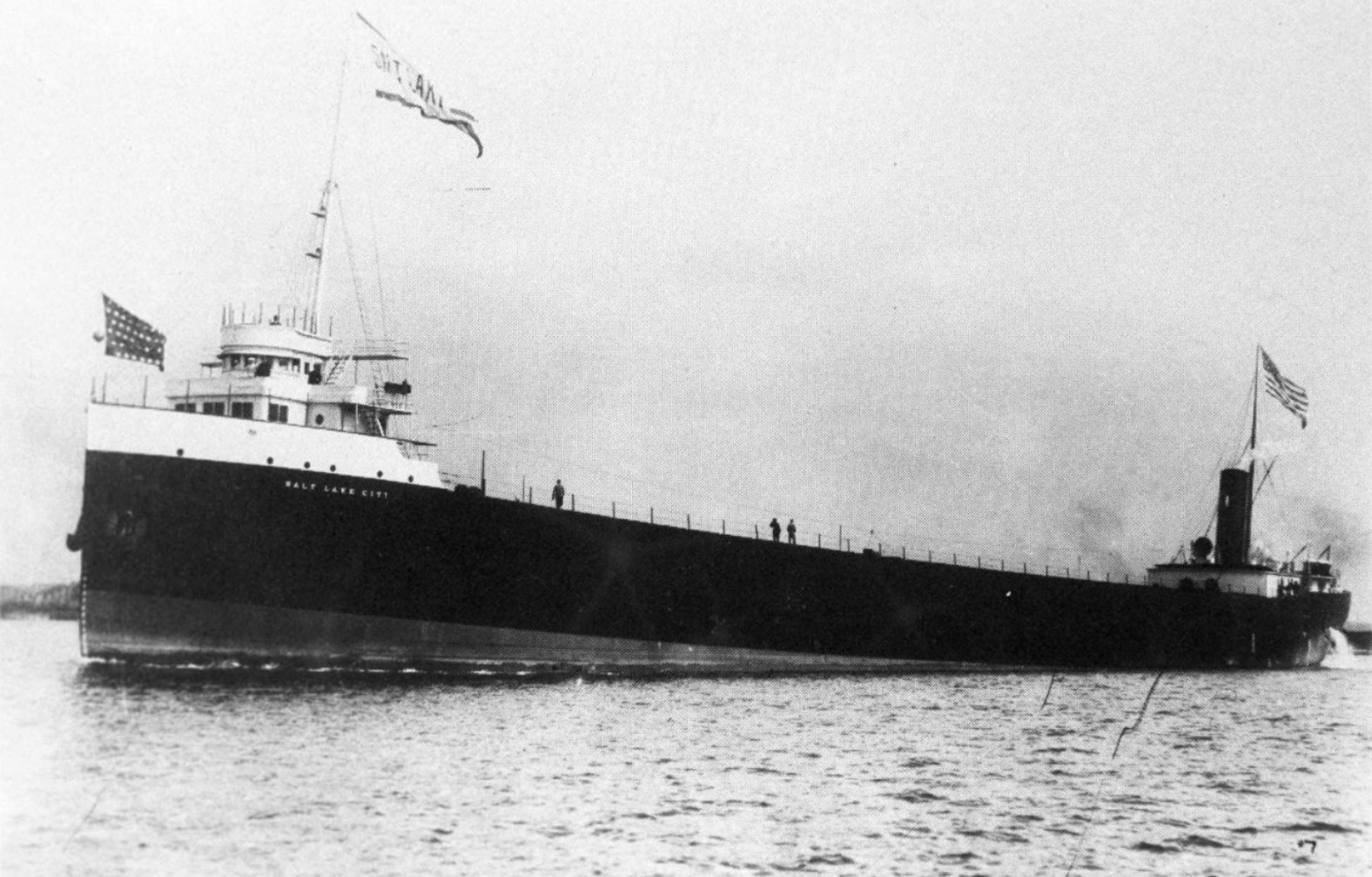
Salt Lake City early in her career

Salt Lake City was enrolled in Cleveland on 11 September 1907, and her home port was Fairport, Ohio. She began her maiden voyage on 19 September, leaving the shipyard under the command of Captain James Owen. In June the following year, she struck a scow at the Twin Ports.

In 1911, the Holmes Steamship Company merged into the Acme Transit Company, which was managed by H. B. Hawgood. On 2 February 1912, Salt Lake City was sold to the G. A. Tomlinson managed Continental Steamship Company of Duluth, Minnesota. She was renamed Chester A. Congdon, in honour of lawyer and entrepreneur Chester Adgate Congdon. By 1915, her home port had been changed to Duluth.

In April 1912, Chester A. Congdon was in Milwaukee, Wisconsin, when she broke away from the tugs towing her and struck the freighter Charles Weston, damaging two of her own hull plates in the process. While waiting for fog to lift on Lake Michigan on 10 August that same year, Chester A. Congdon drifted onto a shoal roughly 4 miles (6.4 km) north of Cana Island. She damaged 90 hull plates and around 50 frames, arriving in Superior, Wisconsin, on 20 August for repairs that took ten days to complete.

On 26 September 1913, Chester A. Congdon struck the breakwater in Fairport harbour, damaging her steering quadrant. She was repaired in Fairport. As Chester A. Congdon was travelling on the Detroit River in October 1915, her bilge scraped along the bottom near Grosse Pointe, Michigan, due to low water levels. Several of her rivets were sheered off, causing her hull to leak; she was repaired in Superior.

=== Final voyage ===
On 5 November 1918, Chester A. Congdon arrived in Fort William, Ontario, where she loaded 380,000 bushels of wheat at the Ogilvie & Pacific grain elevators. (Note: Other sources have listed her cargo as 350,000, 390,000, or 400,000 bushels.) At 02:28 (EST) the next day, she left Fort William for Port McNicoll, Ontario, under the command of Captain Charles J. Autterson. Shortly after passing Thunder Cape, Chester A. Congdon encountered a heavy storm. At 04:00, Captain Autterson decided to head back into Thunder Bay for 7–8 miles (11.3–12.9 km), and anchor until the storm subsided. Chester A. Congdon headed back into open water at 10:15. By that time the wind had stopped, however the waves were still present. After she passed Thunder Cape, a thick fog descended on Lake Superior. Captain Autterson set a course for Passage Island at 10:40, with the intention of running for 2.5 hours at a speed of 9 knots (17 km/h; 10 mph), and anchoring if the fog remained. At 13:08, Chester A. Congdon ran aground on the southern reef of Canoe Rocks, on the northeast point of Isle Royale, her officers not having heard the fog signal from Passage Island.

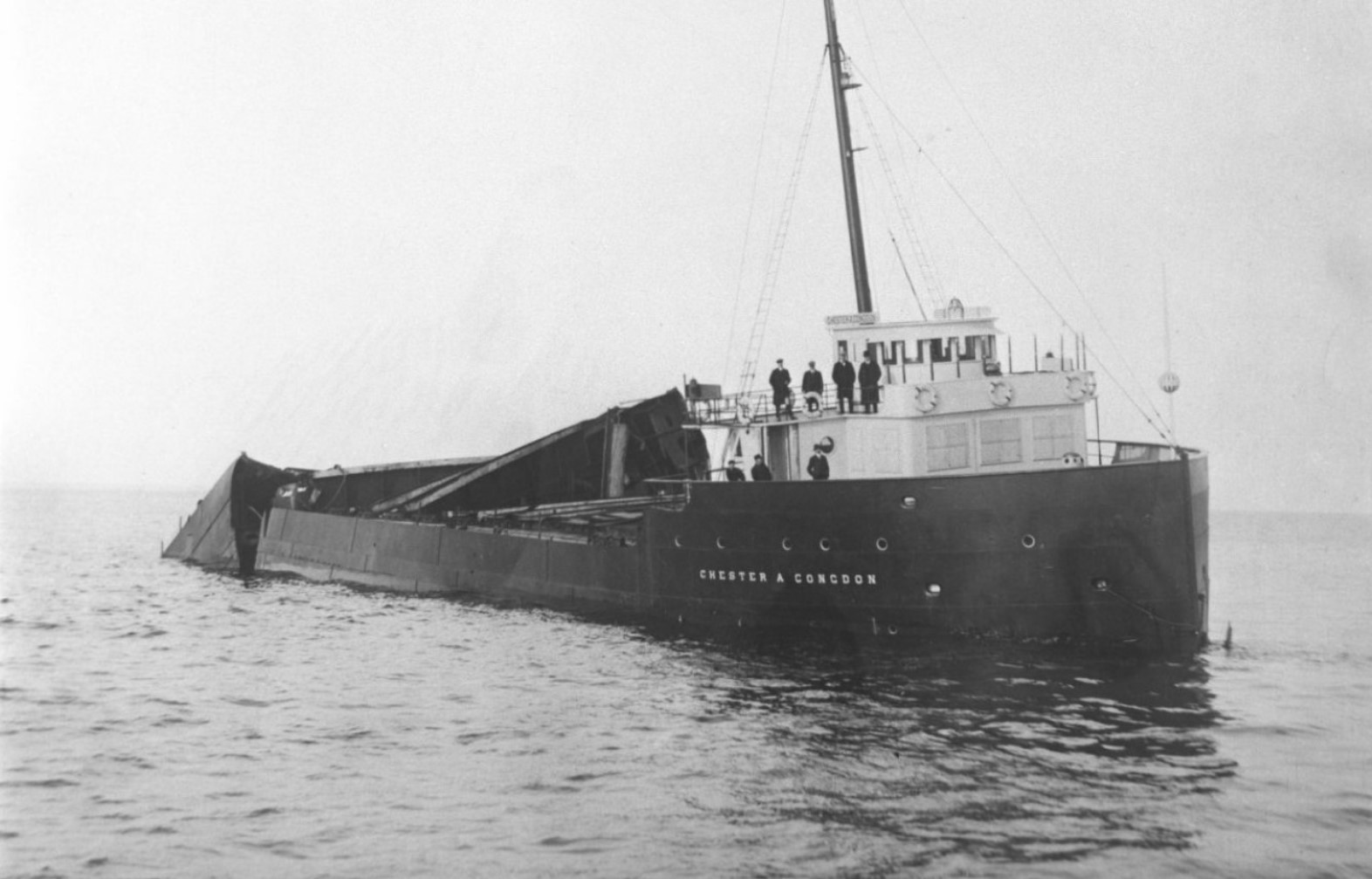
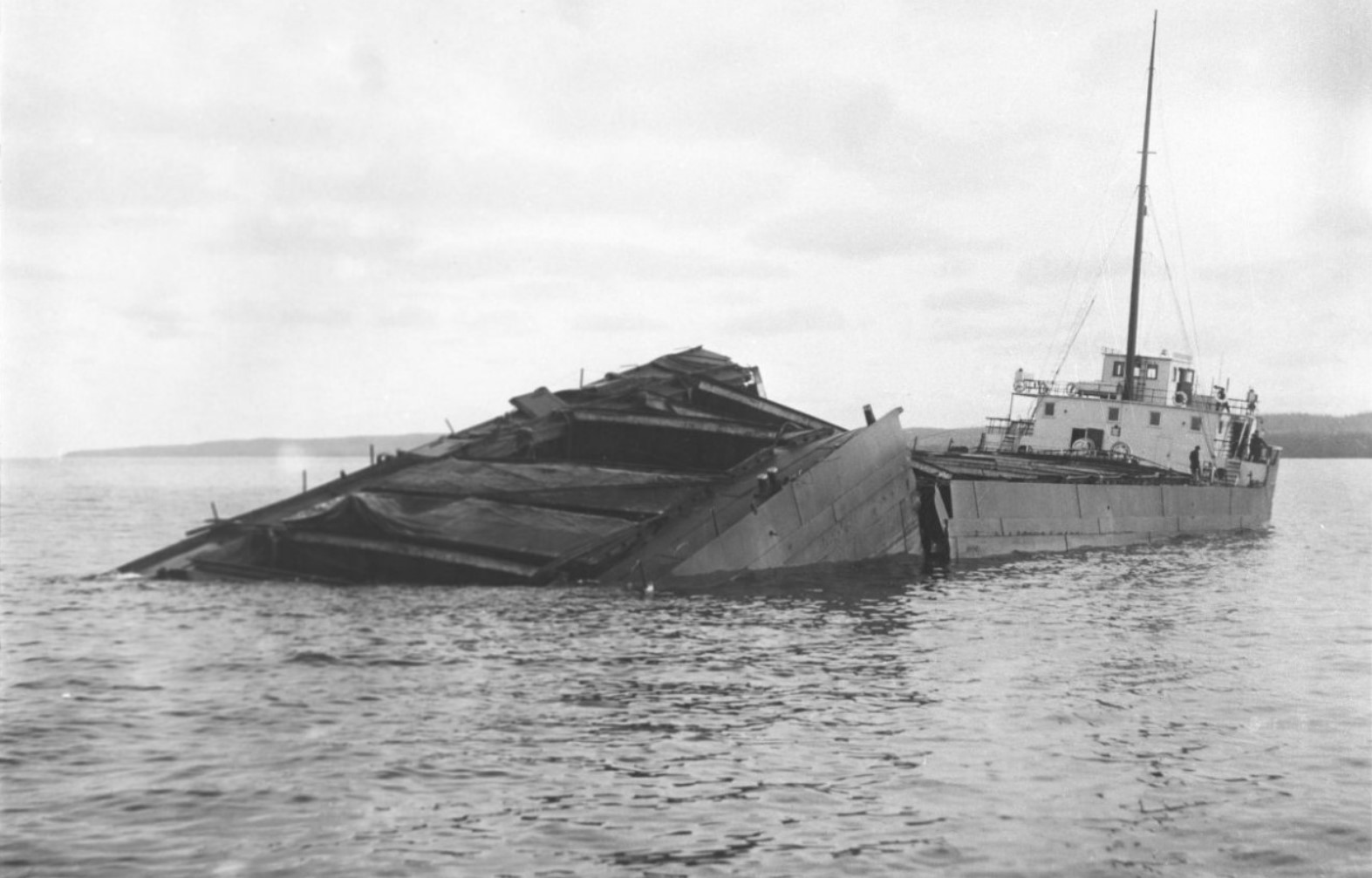
Chester A. Congdon after she broke in two

The lifeboats were lowered, one of which headed to Passage Island (roughly 7 miles (11.3 km) away) to request assistance from the lighthouse keeper. A launch, occupied by two fishermen arrived at the scene to render assistance. The fishermen took the second mate to Fort William, however the launch broke down, causing them to not reach their destination until 06:00 on 7 November. After the second mate relayed the news, the manager of the Canadian Wrecking & Towing Company, J. Wolvin, dispatched the wrecking barge Empire, and the tugs A. B. Conmee and Sarnia to the wreck. It was reported that Chester A. Congdon's first tank on her port side, and the first and second tanks on her starboard side were full of water. It was hoped that removing her cargo would be enough to refloat her. The removed grain was to be loaded onto the barge Crete. On 8 November, a storm with 55 miles per hour (88.5 km/h) winds forced the salvors to abandon the wreck. Chester A. Congdon's crew was removed by Empire, which then sought shelter at Isle Royale. By the time the salvage crew returned to Chester A. Congdon's wreck, it had broken in two between the 6th and 7th hatches, and the stern had sunk.

Chester A. Congdon was declared a total loss. On November 29, it was announced that businessman James Playfair of Midland, Ontario, had purchased her wreck for $10,000 (equivalent to $138,042 in 2024), with the intention of raising it in early 1919. (Note: Johnston, Louis & Williamson, Samuel H. (2023). "What Was the U.S. GDP Then?". MeasuringWorth. United States Gross Domestic Product deflator figures follow the MeasuringWorth series.) By about December, Chester A. Congdon's wreck had sunk, sliding down both sides of the reef.

==== Aftermath ====
There were no deaths when the freighter sank. However, the wireless operator on Empire seriously injured his thigh when it became caught in the hoisting gear. Only 50,000 to 60,000 bushels of her cargo was removed. At over $1.5 million (equivalent to $20.7 million in 2024), she was the largest financial loss on the Great Lakes up to that point, as well as Lake Superior's first $1 million shipwreck. As a result of the First World War, the price of wheat was $2.35 (equivalent to $32.00 in 2024) per bushel. Chester A. Congdon's cargo was valued at over $893,000 (equivalent to $12.3 million in 2024), her hull at $365,000 (equivalent to $5.04 million in 2024), and the disbursements at $369,400 (equivalent to $5.1 million in 2024).

Chester A. Congdon, along with the identically–sized D. R. Hanna (lost on Lake Huron in 1919), remained the largest shipwrecks on the Great Lakes until the loss of the self-unloading freighter Carl D. Bradley in 1958. (Note: The 600 foot (182.9 m) freighter William C. Moreland wrecked on the Keweenaw Peninsula in 1910. However, her stern section was recovered.) Chester A. Congdon remained Lake Superior's largest shipwreck until the sinking of the freighter Edmund Fitzgerald in 1975.

== Chester A. Congdon wreck ==
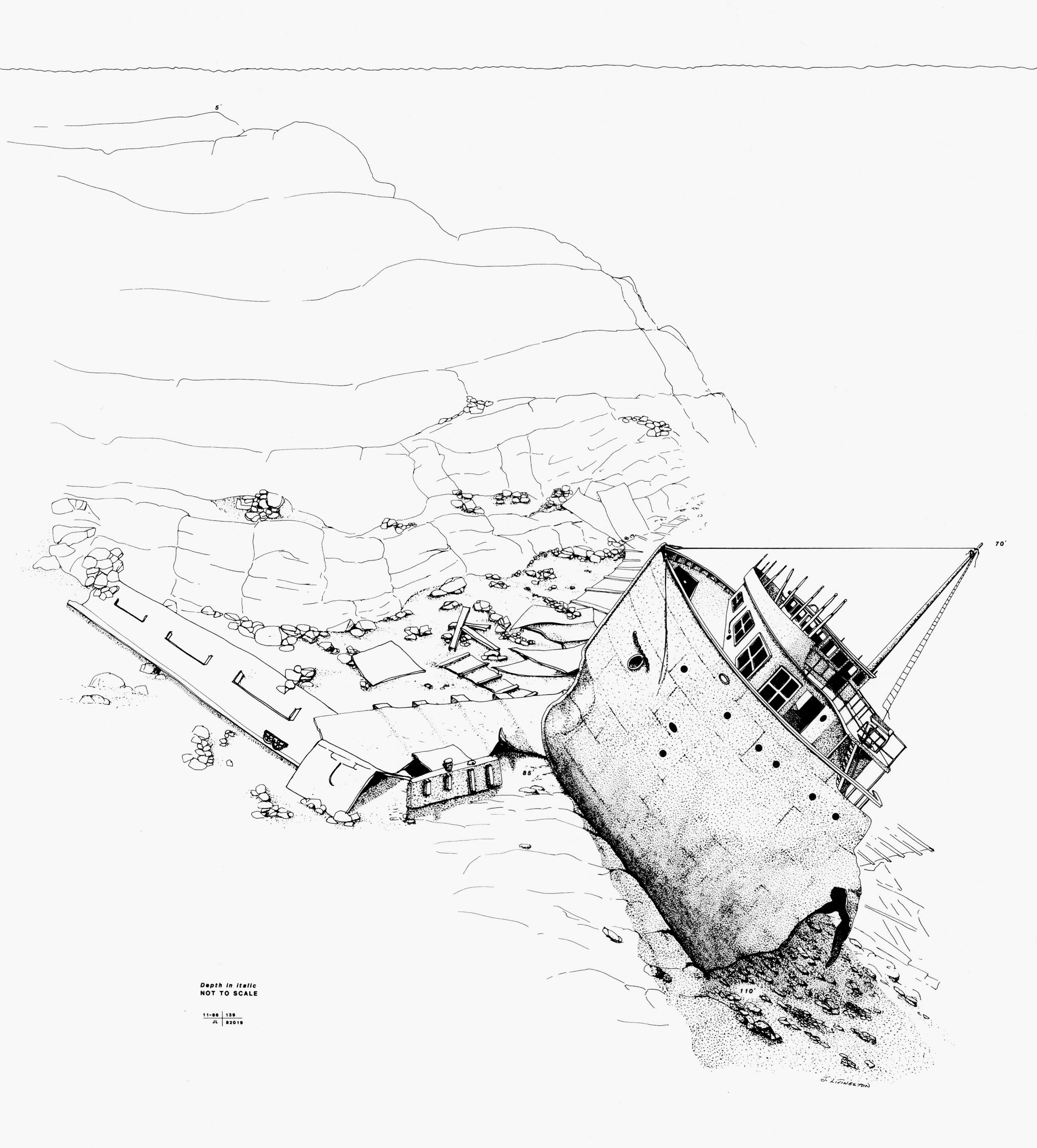
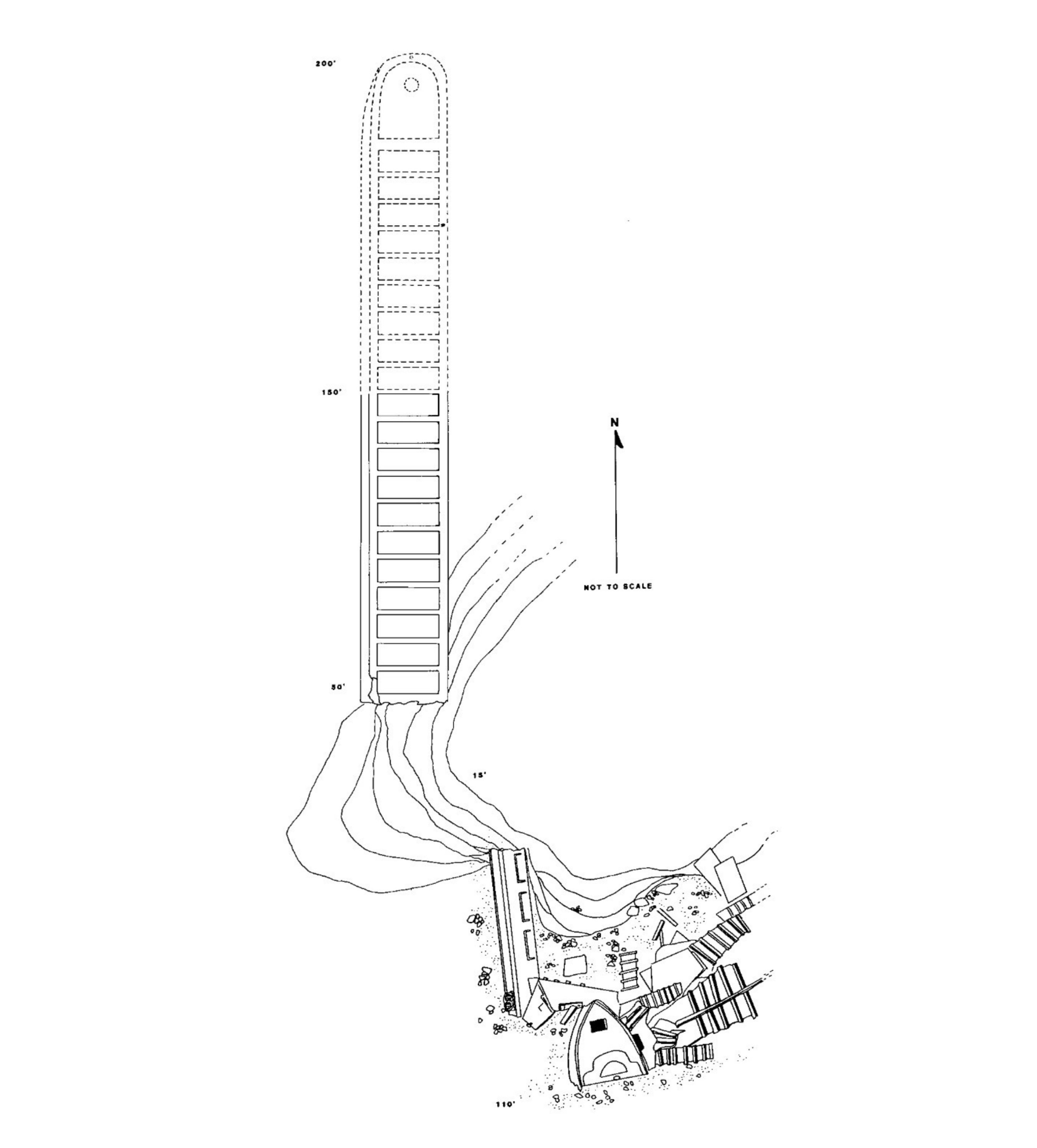
The separate sections of Chester A. Congdon's wreck

Chester A. Congdon became the largest shipwreck sunk near Isle Royale. She rests in two pieces, with the bow on the south side of the reef now known as Congdon Shoal in 60–120 feet (18.3–36.6 m) of water, and the stern on the north side in between 20 and 210 feet (6.1 and 64.0 m) of water. The bow rests at the base of an underwater cliff at an angle of between 35° and 59°, with the partially damaged stem pointing towards the shoal. The wreck contains an intact pilothouse and forecastle deck, as well as penetrable living quarters, and a windlass room which is accessible through a hole in the forward deck. The stern section rests at a steep angle, and has an intact engine room and stern cabins. The rudder was driven through the deck when the stern hit the bottom. Pieces of her hull are on top of the shoal in 10 feet (3.0 m) of water.

Chester A. Congdon's wreck was listed on the National Register of Historic Places on June 12, 1984. As of 2009, she is Isle Royale's third most frequently visited shipwreck (behind the lake freighter Emperor, and the excursion steamer America respectively), with over 150 dives made out of the 1062 dives made to the wrecks in the park that year.

== Sources ==
- "A Directory of Names, Pennant Numbers and Addresses of all Members of the Ship Masters' Association of the Great Lakes". Norwalk, Ohio: American Publishers Company. 1915.
- Bowlus, W. Bruce (2010). Iron Ore Transport on the Great Lakes: The Development of a Delivery System to Feed American Industry. Jefferson, North Carolina: McFarland & Company, Inc. ISBN 978-0-786433-26-1.
- Bugbee, Gordon P. (February 1962a). "Iron Merchant Ships: An Upper Lakes Centennial - Part One" (PDF). Detroit, Michigan: Great Lakes Maritime Institute.
- Bugbee, Gordon P. (March 1962b). "Iron Merchant Ships: An Upper Lakes Centennial – Part Two" (PDF). Detroit, Michigan: Great Lakes Maritime Institute.
- Carrell, Toni (1983). "Shipwrecks of Isle Royale National Park (Thematic Group)". Washington D.C.: National Park Service.
- "Chester A. Congdon". Washington D.C.: National Park Service.
- "Chester A. Congdon (Propeller), U204526, struck bottom, 1 Oct 1915". Ontario, Canada: Maritime History of the Great Lakes. 1915.
- "Chester A. Congdon (Propeller), U204526, aground, 8 Nov 1918". Ontario, Canada: Maritime History of the Great Lakes. 1918.
- "Choctaw Shipwreck Site National Register of Historic Places Registration Form" (PDF). Washington D.C.: National Park Service. 2018. Archived from the original (PDF) on 1 January 2019.
- Green, Fred W. (1915). "Green's Marine Directory of the Great Lakes, 1915". Cleveland, Ohio.
- Harrington, Steve (1998). Divers Guide to Michigan. St. Ignace, Michigan: Maritime Press & Great Lakes Diving Council, Inc. ISBN 978-0-9624-6299-3.
- Herriman, F. D. (1908). "Great Lakes Register 1908". Cleveland, Ohio: Great Lakes Register.
- Herriman, H. N. (1915). "Great Lakes Register 1915". Cleveland, Ohio: Great Lakes Register.
- Kohl, Cris (2005). The 100 Best Great Lakes Shipwrecks – Volume II. West Chicago, Illinois: Seawolf Communications. ISBN 978-0-9679-9766-7.
- Labadie, C. Patrick; Richards, Donald (1968). "Telescope – Volume 17, Number 7". Detroit, Michigan: Great Lakes Maritime Institute.
- Lenihan, Daniel J. (1987). "Submerged Cultural Resources Study: Isle Royale National Park" (PDF). Washington D.C.: National Park Service. Archived from the original (PDF) on 7 February 2017.
- McGraw, Kathy (1987). "Telescope – Volume 36, Number 2". Detroit, Michigan: Great Lakes Maritime Institute.
- Merryman, Ken (2022). "Chester A. Congdon". Fridley, Minnesota: Superior Trips.
- "Moreland, William C." Bowling Green, Ohio: Bowling Green State University. 2021.
- "Salt Lake City". Bowling Green, Ohio: Bowling Green State University. 2021.
- "Salt Lake City (1907, Bulk Freighter)". Alpena, Michigan: Alpena County George N. Fletcher Public Library. 2021.
- Stonehouse, Frederick (1990) [1984]. Went Missing, II. Au Train, Michigan: Avery Color Studios. ISBN 978-0-932212-37-5.
- Swayze, David (2001). "Great Lakes Shipwrecks – C". Port Huron, Michigan: Boatnerd. Archived from the original on 16 April 2002.
- The Greenstone (2010). "The Greenstone 2010" (PDF). Washington D.C.: National Park Service. Archived from the original (PDF) on 6 August 2011.
- "The Marine Review (Cleveland, Ohio), 15 Aug 1907". Cleveland, Ohio: The Marine Review. 1907.
- "The Marine Review (Cleveland, Ohio), 5 Sep 1907". Cleveland, Ohio: The Marine Review. 1907.
- "The Marine Review (Cleveland, Ohio), 26 Sep 1907". Cleveland, Ohio: The Marine Review. 1907.
- "The Marine Review (Cleveland, Ohio), 7 Nov 1907". Cleveland, Ohio: The Marine Review. 1907.
- "The Marine Review (Cleveland, Ohio), 18 Mar 1909". Cleveland, Ohio: The Marine Review. 1909.
- "The Marine Review (Cleveland, Ohio), February 1912". Cleveland, Ohio: The Marine Review. 1912.
- "The Marine Review (Cleveland, Ohio), August 1912". Cleveland, Ohio: The Marine Review. 1912.
- "The Marine Review (Cleveland, Ohio), December 1912". Cleveland, Ohio: The Marine Review. 1912.
- "The Marine Review (Cleveland, Ohio), January 1914". Cleveland, Ohio: The Marine Review.
- Thompson, Mark L. (1994). Queen of the Lakes. Detroit, Michigan: Wayne State University Press. ISBN 0-8143-2393-6.
- Thompson, Mark L. (2004). Graveyard of the Lakes. Detroit, Michigan: Wayne State University Press. ISBN 978-0-814332-26-9.
- Wicklund, Richard H. (1977). "Telescope – Volume 26, Number 5" (PDF). Detroit, Michigan: Great Lakes Maritime Institute.
- Wolff, Julius F. Jr. (1972). "The Shipwrecks of Lake Superior, 1900 – 1909". Inland Seas. 28 (1). Toledo, Ohio: Great Lakes Historical Society: 51–63 – via National Museum of the Great Lakes.
