= SS Emperor =

Canadian Great Lakes freighter 1910-1947

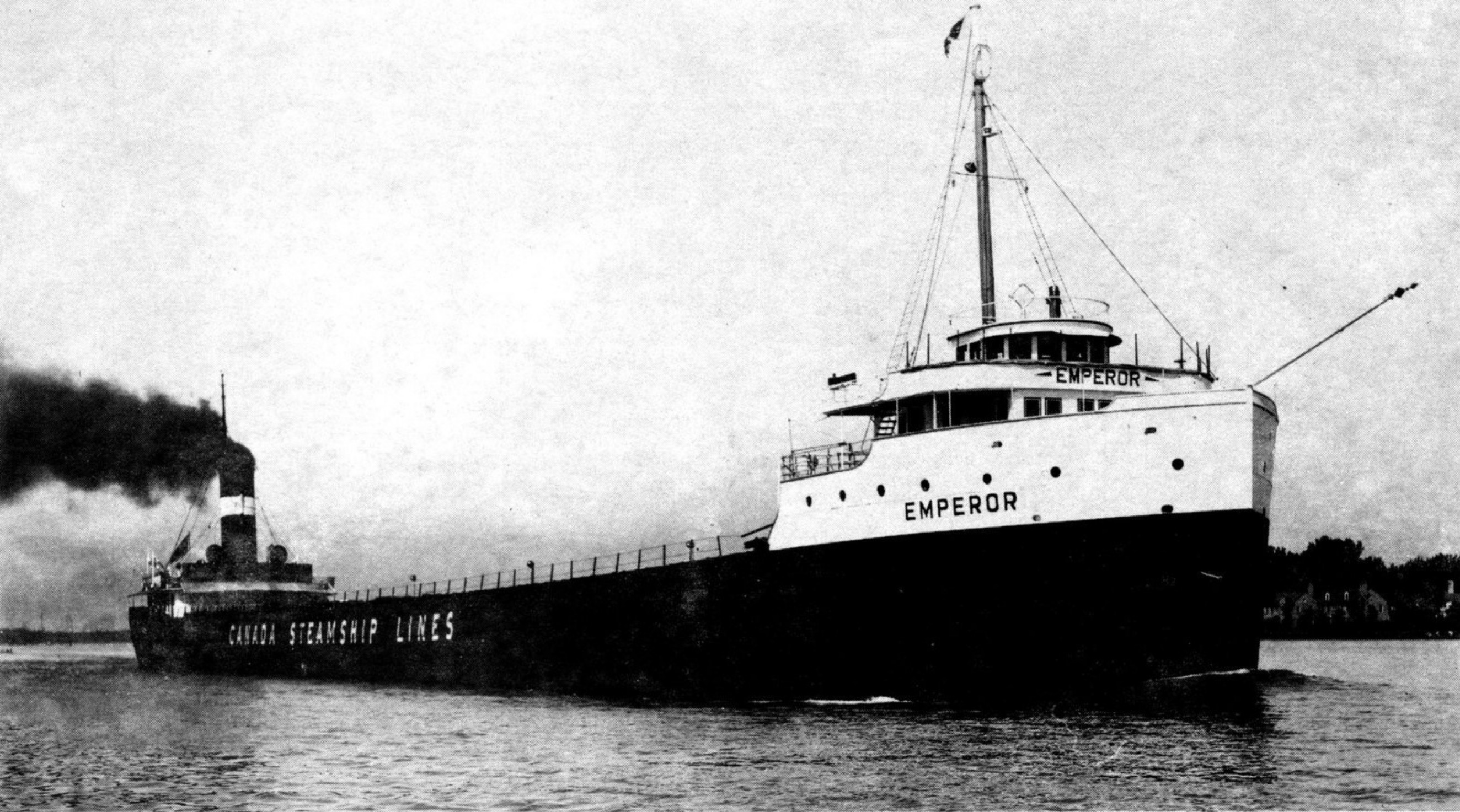
- Emperor downbound in the St. Clair River on May 5, 1939

History

Canada
- Name: Emperor
- Operator: Inland Lines, Ltd. (1911–1913); Canada Steamship Lines (1913–1947)
- Port of registry: Midland, Ontario
- Builder: Collingwood Shipbuilding Company, Collingwood, Ontario
- Yard number: 28
- Launched: December 17, 1910
- Christened: James Playfair
- Completed: April 1911
- Maiden voyage: May 3, 1911
- Out of service: June 4, 1947
- Identification: Canadian official number 126654
- Nickname(s): The Pride of Canada
- Fate: Sank on Lake Superior

General characteristics
- Class & type: Lake freighter
- Tonnage: 7,031 GRT; 5,048 NRT
- Length: 525 feet (160.0 m) LOA; 504 feet (153.6 m) LBP
- Beam: 56.1 feet (17.1 m)
- Draught: 27 feet (8.2 m)
- Depth: 31 feet (9.4 m) (moulded)
- Installed power: Engine: 1 × 2,200 hp (1,600 kW) 82 rpm triple expansion steam engine; Boilers: 2 × 180 pounds per square inch (1,200 kPa) Scotch marine boilers
- Propulsion: 1 × fixed pitch propeller
- Speed: 10 knots (19 km/h; 12 mph) (nominal)
- Capacity: 10,000 long tons (10,160 t)

National Register of Historic Places data
Emperor
U.S. National Register of Historic Places
Location within Michigan Location within the United States
Location	North side of Canoe Rocks, on the northeast end of Isle Royale National Park, Michigan
Coordinates	48°12′2″N 88°29′30″W
Area	91.8 acres (37.2 ha)
Built	1910
Architect	Collingwood Shipbuilding Company
Architectural style	Freighter
MPS	Shipwrecks of Isle Royale National Park TR
NRHP reference No.	84001748
Added to NRHP	June 14, 1984

SS Emperor was a Canadian lake freighter in service between 1911 and 1947. She was built between 1910 and April 1911 by the Collingwood Shipbuilding Company in Collingwood, Ontario, for Inland Lines, Ltd., of Midland, Ontario. She entered service on May 3, 1911. Emperor was sold to Canada Steamship Lines of Montreal, Quebec. Under the ownership of Canada Steamship Lines, she carried a wide variety of cargoes, but most frequently iron ore to Point Edward, Ontario, where it would be transported to Hamilton, Ontario, by train. After the opening of the fourth Welland Canal, Emperor carried the ore directly to Hamilton. She was involved in several accidents throughout her career.

After discharging a cargo of coal in Fort William, Ontario, on June 3, 1947, Emperor headed to Port Arthur, Ontario, where she loaded 10,264 long tons (11,496 short tons; 10,429 t) of iron ore bound for Ashtabula, Ohio. She left Port Arthur at 10:55 p.m. (EST). The weather was clear, and visibility was good. At midnight, Captain Eldon Walkinshaw handed over watch duties to first mate James A. Morrey. Emperor ran hard aground on Canoe Rocks, on the northeast point of Isle Royale shortly before 4:15 a.m. on June 4. She sank in between 20 and 35 minutes. Twelve of her crew were killed, while the 21 survivors were picked up by the United States Coast Guard Cutter Kimball.

Emperor's wreck is the most recent, and second largest shipwreck of Isle Royale, surpassed only by the freighter Chester A. Congdon, which also wrecked on Canoe Rocks. The wreck rests in 25 to 175 feet (7.6 to 53.3 m). Her bow lies partially broken up in shallow water, while her stern is intact and in deeper water. The wreck was listed on the National Register of Historic Places in 1984, and has become a popular site for recreational divers.

== History ==
=== Background ===
In 1843, the gunship USS Michigan became the first iron-hulled vessel built on the Great Lakes upon her launching in Erie, Pennsylvania. Though Canadian merchants were importing iron vessels prefabricated in the United Kingdom by the mid-1840s, the first regionally produced iron-hulled merchant vessel, Merchant, would not be built until 1862. Despite Merchant's clear success proving the potential of iron hulls, ships built from wood remained preferable until the 1880s due to their lower cost, as well as the abundance of high-quality timber and workers trained in carpentry. Between the early 1870s and the mid-1880s, shipyards around the Great Lakes began to construct iron ships on a relatively large scale.

In 1884, the first steel freighters were built on the Great Lakes, with metal becoming a material used in the construction of new hulls by the 1890s. Rapidly decreasing steel prices, combined with the development of the pneumatic rivet gun and the advancement of gantry cranes enabling shipyard employees to work at an increased speed and with greater efficiency, contributed to the rapid increase in the size of lake freighters in the late 19th and early 20th centuries.

Throughout the 1880s, the iron ore trade on the Great Lakes grew quickly, primarily due to the increasing size of the lake freighters and the rise in the number of trips they made to the ore docks of Lake Superior. With the railways unable to keep up with the rapid extraction of iron ore, bulk freighters became an integral component in the region's iron ore industry. By 1890, 57% of the 16,000,000 long tons (16,256,751 t) of the iron ore produced by mines in the United States was sourced from the region surrounding Lake Superior.

=== Design and construction ===
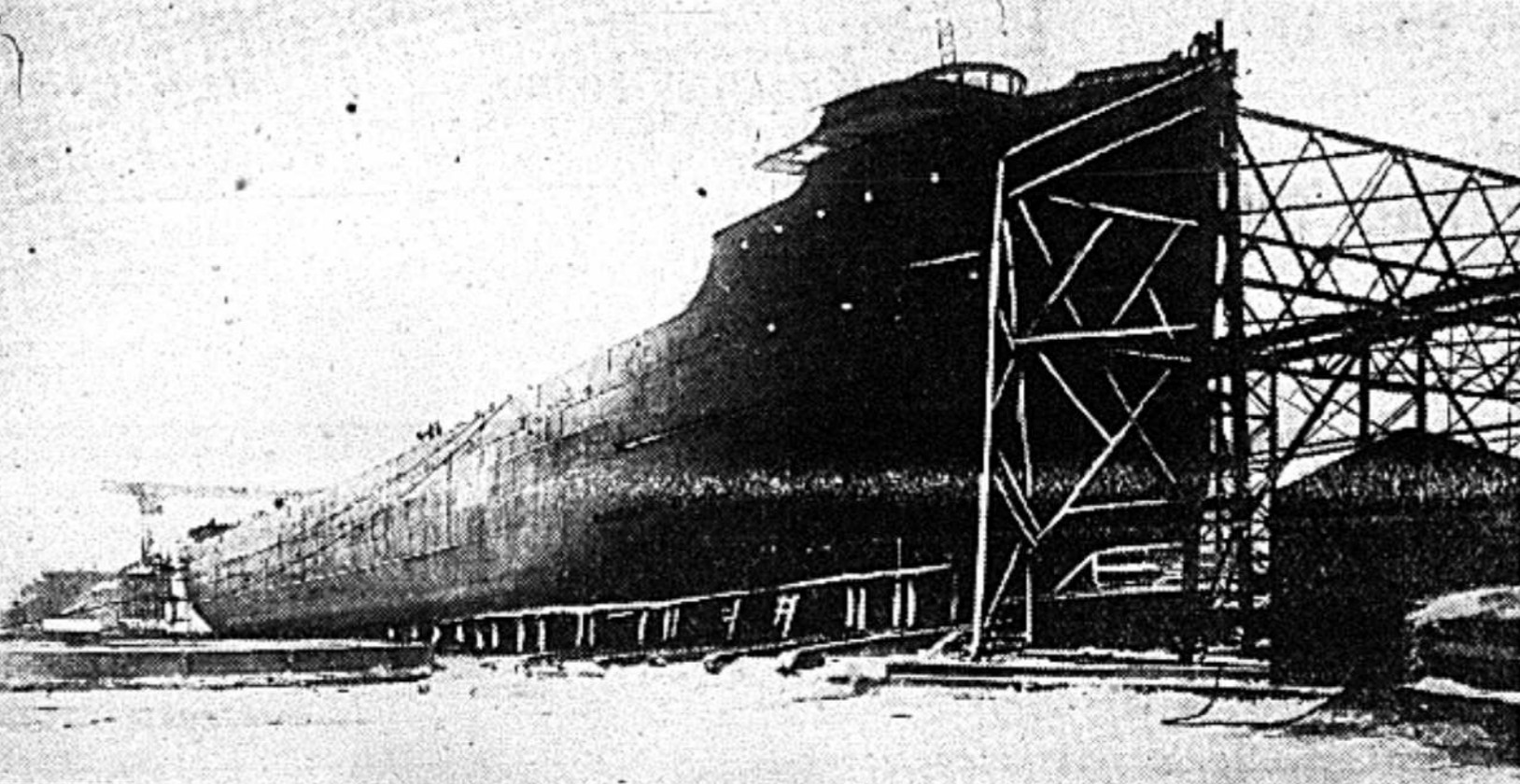
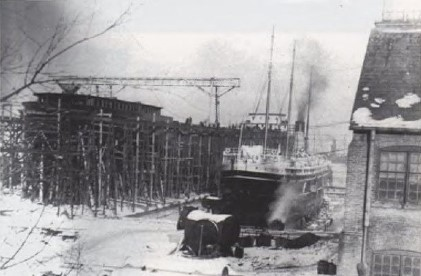
Emperor under construction in December 1910

Emperor (Canadian official number 126654) was built in Collingwood, Ontario, between 1910 and 1911, by the Collingwood Shipbuilding Company. She was launched into Collingwood harbour on December 17, 1910, as hull number 28; she was christened by James Playfair of Midland, Ontario. Emperor was built for the Playfair managed Inland Lines, Ltd. of Hamilton, Ontario. Playfair was known to give the ships in his fleet names related to royalty. Emperor was ready to go into commission in April 1911. When she was completed, Emperor became the largest Canadian ship built to that date, earning her the nickname "The Pride of Canada". She was built exclusively for the iron ore trade. (Note: Her size necessitated the lengthening of the wharf 200 feet (61.0 m) south, and 60 feet (18.3 m) west of the ore dock in Point Edward, Ontario.)

Built with an arch-and-web frame system designed to create an unobstructed cargo hold, Emperor had 30 cargo hatches. The hatches were 9 feet (2.7 m) by 36 feet (11.0 m) wide, and were placed 12 feet (3.7 m) apart. Emperor's cargo hold was divided into five separate compartments, each with six hatches and a capacity of 2,000 long tons (2,032 t); she had a total cargo capacity of 10,000 long tons (10,160 t). There was an ore chute at each hatch. She was equipped with seven side-ballast and bilge tanks (each with a capacity of 5,021 long tons (5,102 t)), which were connected with seven steel pipes. The side and bottom tanks were not separated. This tank system enabled Emperor to quickly take on and discharge water. Emperor had 11 bulkheads. Her pilothouse, the captain's and mate's quarters were at the bow, while the crew's quarters were located at the stern. Emperor's engine room was 67 feet (20.4 m) in length.

The hull of Emperor had an overall length of 525 feet (160.0 m), and a length between perpendiculars of 504 feet (153.6 m). Her beam was 56.1 feet (17.1 m) wide. (Note: Lenihan lists the width of Emperor's beam as 56 feet (17.1 m).) The moulded depth (roughly speaking, the vertical height of Emperor's hull) was 31 feet (9.4 m). Her maximum draught was 27 feet (8.2 m). Emperor had a gross register tonnage of 7,031 and a net register tonnage of 5,408.

Emperor was powered by a 2,200 hp (1,600 kW) 82 rpm triple-expansion steam engine; the cylinders of the engine were 23 inches (58.4 cm), 38.5 inches (97.8 cm) and 63 inches (160.0 cm) in diameter, and had a stroke of 42 inches (106.7 cm). Steam was provided by two coal-fired, single-ended Scotch marine boilers 12 feet (3.7 m) in length and 15 feet 6 inches (4.7 m) in diameter, with a working pressure of 180-pound-per-square-inch (1,200 kPa). The boilers were each fitted with 6 furnaces, accounting for a combined grate surface of 156 square feet (14.5 m^{2}), and a total heating surface of 5,880 square feet (546.3 m^{2}). Both the engine and boilers were manufactured by Emperor's builder. Emperor had a registered nominal speed of 10 knots (19 km/h; 12 mph). (Note: By the time Emperor sank, her usual speed when loaded was 11 knots (20 km/h; 13 mph).)

=== Service history ===
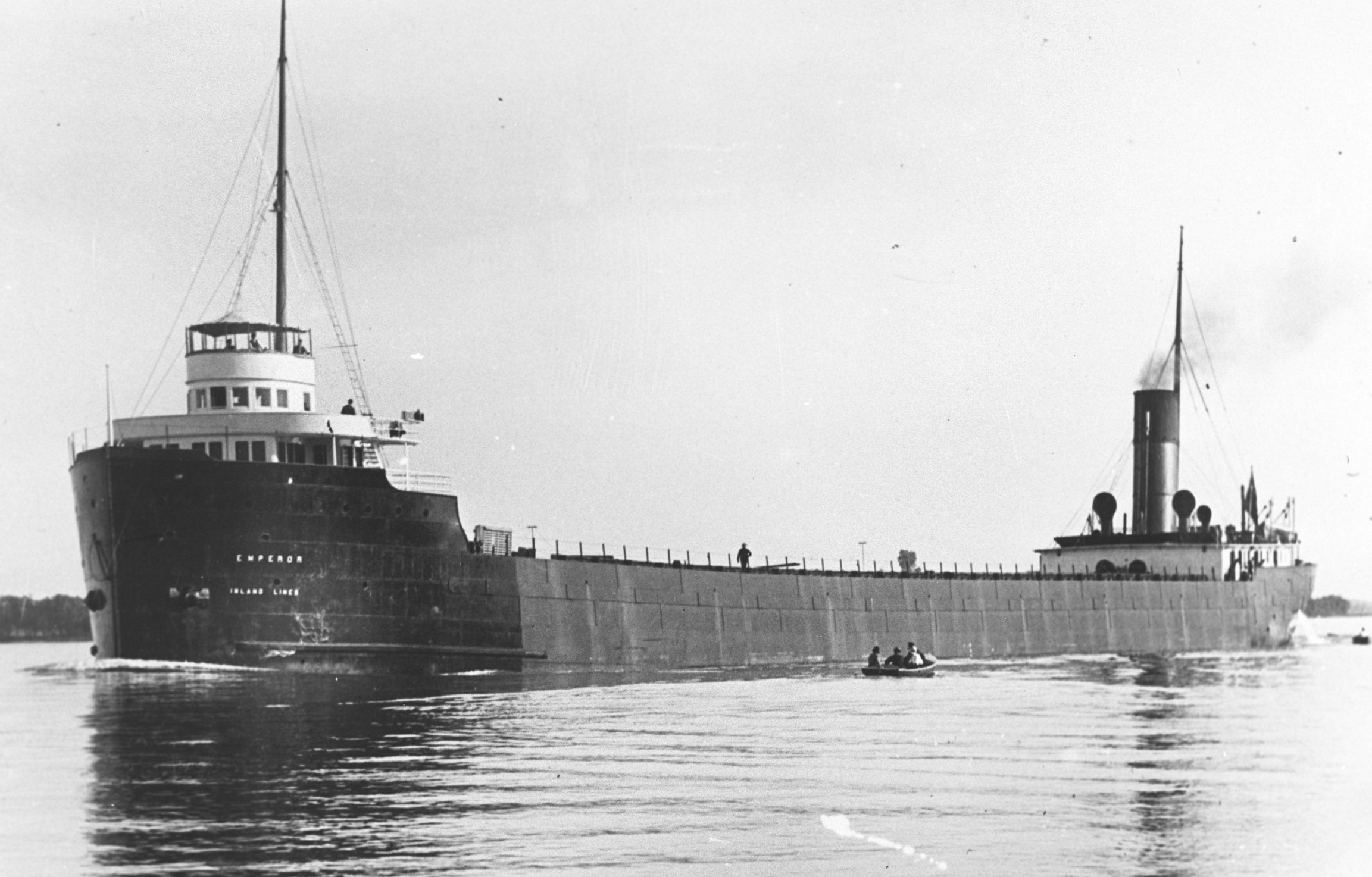
Emperor early in her career

Emperor was accepted by Inland Lines, Ltd. after she ran her sea trials in Georgian Bay off Collingwood. She commenced her maiden voyage on May 3, 1911, sailing upbound, without cargo. While upbound on Lake Huron on May 17, Emperor broke her propeller shaft in Thunder Bay. She was towed to DeTour, Michigan, by the package freighter Superior, after which she was towed to Port Arthur, Ontario, for repairs. On June 16, 1911, the Richelieu & Ontario Navigation Company, Ltd. of Montreal, Quebec, acquired a controlling interest in Inland Lines, Ltd.

On October 18, 1911, Emperor was bound from Fort William, Ontario, for Midland with 310,000 bushels of wheat. While anchoring below the Canadian lock at the Soo Locks, Emperor overrode her anchor, tore a hole in her bow and sank into 20 feet (6.1 m) of water 400 feet (121.9 m) below the lower entry. Her stern went against the north pier, while her bow swung 100 feet (30.5 m) into the channel, blocking it. She was raised on May 19, and after temporary repairs were made, she taken to Midland. Emperor's captain, George Pearson said of the accident:

I was not on the bast at the time of the accident, the steamer being temporarily in charge of the first mate. It is usual for a steamer leaving the lock to give a sharp blast, indicating to the canal crew that all is in readiness for the flood. In this case the flood was forced. As soon as the gates were opened the force of the water parted the lines of the steamer, causing her to leave the canal at high speed. The mate ordered an anchor dropped. The water at this point was not sufficiently deep to override the anchor, with the result that it was hit by the steamer and tore a hole in her bottom.

A court inquiry conducted in Collingwood by Dominion Wreck Commissioner L. A. Demmers determined that the canal employees were to blame for the sinking, as they flooded the lock without checking if Emperor was ready. The court further stated that it believed it was "customary for the master of a vessel to sound one blast of the whistle as a signal to the canal authorities to begin flooding", also adding that it "thinks it is extremely necessary that masters of all vessels should have copies of the regulations governing the operation of locks and canals". Emperor's officers were acquitted of any wrongdoing, with the blame being placed on a watchman who "happened to be a deck hand, and therefore irresponsible".

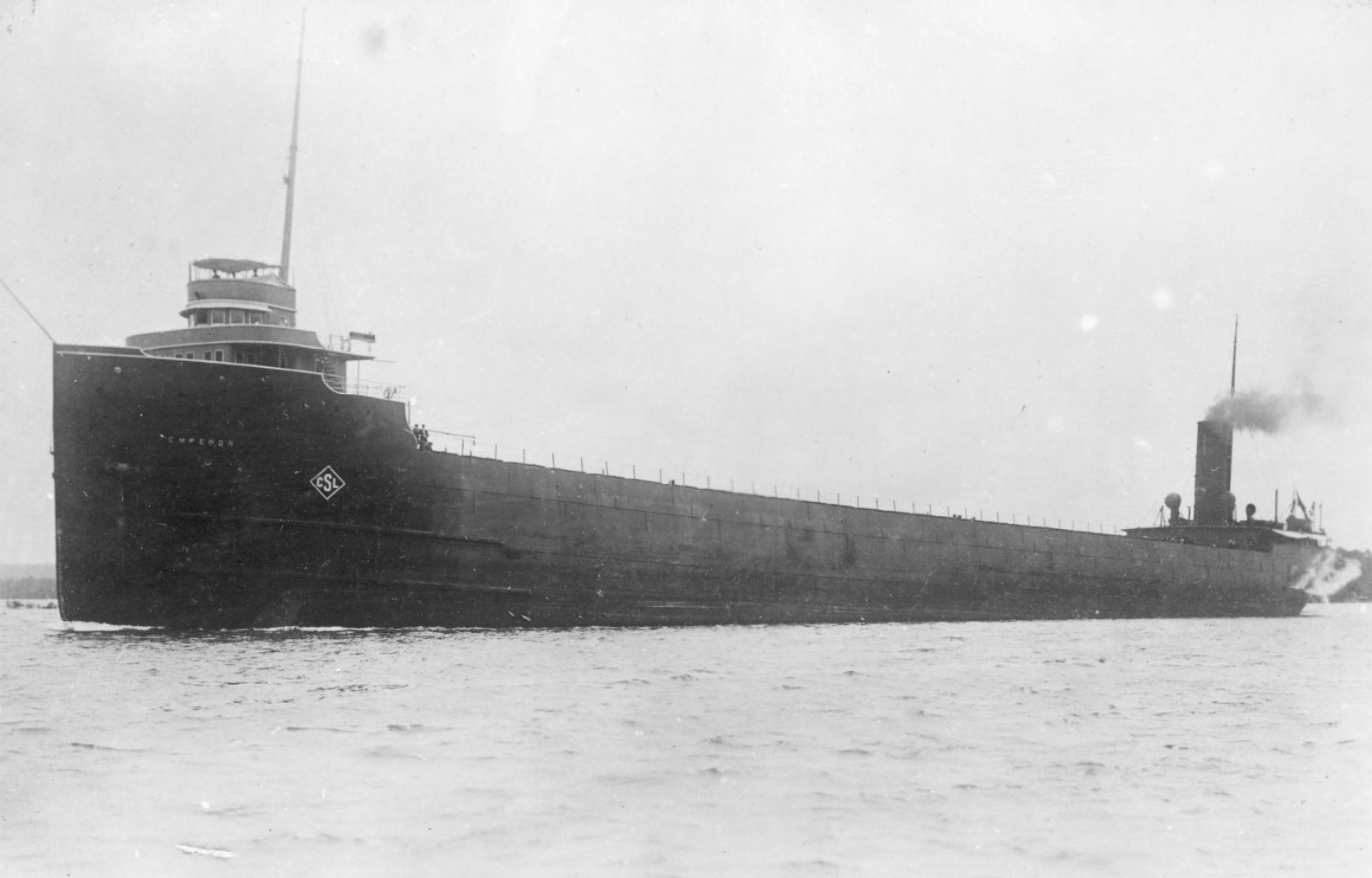
Emperor c. 1915 in the St. Marys River

In 1913, the Richelieu & Ontario Navigation Company, Ltd. was merged into the newly formed, Montreal-based Canada Transportation Company, Ltd., the name of which was almost immediately changed to Canada Steamship Lines. While under the ownership of Canada Steamship Lines, Emperor carried a wide variety of cargoes, but mainly carried iron ore to Point Edward, Ontario, which was then taken to the steel mills of Hamilton, Ontario, by train.

While bound for a Lake Superior port, Emperor ran aground on Pointe aux Pins on the north shore of Lake Erie, on the morning of May 29, 1914. She was pulled off the next day by the tugs Hackett and James Reid. On October 29, 1926, Emperor ran aground near Mackinaw City, Michigan, on Major Shoal. She was freed at 16:00 p.m., after jettisoning 886 long tons (992 short tons; 900 t) of iron ore. Sometime before 1932, Emperor reportedly ran aground on an unknown object near Michipicoten Island, while on her way to Fort William.

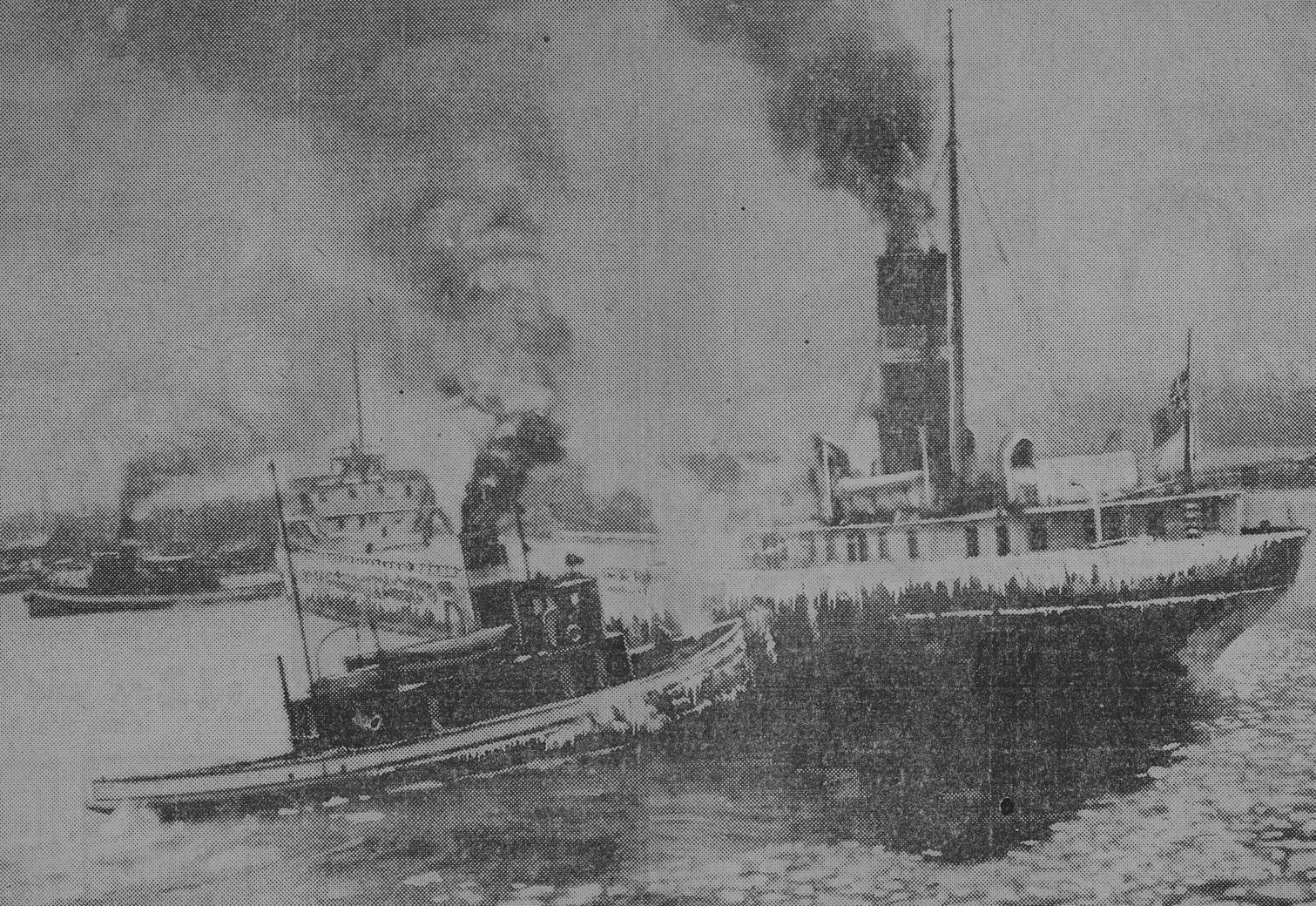
Emperor after losing her rudder

While bound for the lakehead with 8,858 long tons (9,921 short tons; 9,000 t) of coal on the night of November 24, 1936, Emperor encountered a heavy storm. While she was between Passage Island and Lamb Island, she lost her rudder. Emperor spent November 25 drifting in the storm. The tug James Whalen was sent to aid Emperor. However, before she arrived, the canaller Renvoyle arrived on the scene and towed Emperor to Fort William. One of Emperor's deckhands was swept overboard in the storm, and drowned.

On May 4, 1937, Emperor was bound from Port Weller, Ontario, for Hamilton with a cargo of iron ore she loaded in Ashland, Wisconsin. Conditions on Lake Ontario were foggy, which caused Emperor to miss the port turn, which would then have put her on a course to the piers of the Burlington Canal at the entrance to Hamilton harbour. However, she carried on, eventually running aground near Bronte, Ontario, at 11:00 p.m. The tug Rival and barge Londonderry arrived from Kingston, Ontario, to free her. After a portion of Emperor's cargo was removed, she was refloated on May 6, having sustained hardly any damage.

In the spring of 1940, Emperor's first mate James A. Morrey fell overboard from one of the bridge wings. He sustained no serious injuries.

=== Final voyage ===
After unloading a cargo of coal in Fort William on June 3, 1947, Emperor headed to the Canadian National Railway ore dock in Port Arthur, where she loaded 10,264 long tons (11,496 short tons; 10,429 t) of iron ore from the Steep Rock Mine. The loading of the ore took six to seven hours. She left Port Arthur for Ashtabula, Ohio, at 10:55 p.m. (EST), under the command of Captain Eldon Walkinshaw. Two of her 35–man crew were left behind at Fort William. She had a draught of 21.3 feet (6.5 m) at the bow, and 21.9 feet (6.7 m) at the stern. The weather was clement; there was little wind, and visibility was good. At midnight, Walkinshaw handed over watch duties to first mate Morrey, who had supervised the loading of the iron ore. Shortly before 4:15 a.m., Emperor crashed into Canoe Rocks, on the northeast point of Isle Royale, and broke in two.

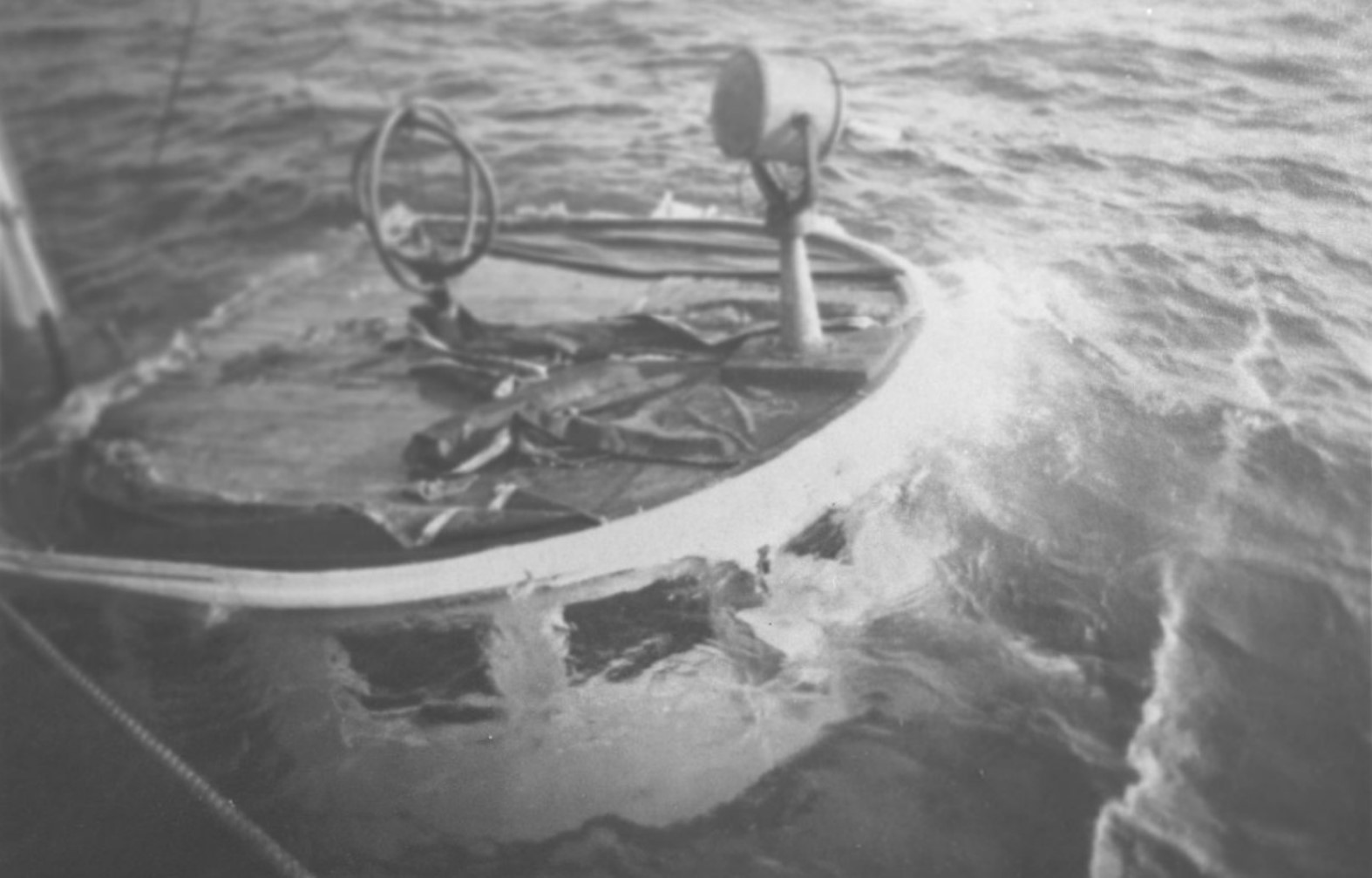
Emperor's pilothouse underwater

About 10 minutes after Emperor struck Canoe Rocks, Walkinshaw gave the order to abandon ship. By that time, she had developed a serious list. The starboard lifeboat was successfully launched, but was leaking due to the absence of a bilge plug. The port boat capsized when it was sucked under by Emperor as she sank. The night steward claimed that Emperor's boilers exploded during the sinking. She sank in between 20 and 35 minutes. The United States Coast Guard Cutter Kimball, which was maintaining navigation lights in the vicinity of Blake Point, intercepted an SOS signal from Emperor and arrived on the scene in 35 minutes. After Kimball transported the 21 survivors and the body of cook Evelyn Schultz to Fort William, she travelled back to the wreck to search for survivors and bodies. Canada Steamship Lines also chartered the excursion boat Coastal Queen to assist in the search. However, bad weather prevented diver E. J. Fowler, who was on board Coastal Queen from reaching the wreck.

==== Investigation ====
The investigation into Emperor's sinking proved to be difficult, as Walkinshaw, Morrey, and helmsman J. Prokup all died. An investigation carried out by the Department of Transport blamed Morrey, who they claimed "did not keep proper watch", for the sinking of Emperor. They determined that Morrey, who was meant to be on watch duty until 6:00 a.m., was likely sleep deprived at the time of the grounding, and had not made the usual navigational checks Emperor would have required to pass safely between Isle Royale and Passage Island. The courts criticised the prevailing system "which required the First Mate to be in charge of the loading of the ship during the period when he should have been off duty, resulted in his becoming overly tired, suffering as he was from a lack of sleep". Furthermore, Prokup, who was unacquainted with that part of Lake Superior, failed to detect the error in Emperor's course. Also criticised were the usage of wooden lifeboats and the lack of lifeboat drills performed on board Emperor in 1947. The Board of Investigation fully exonerated Captain Walkinshaw, stating that "under all the circumstances he did everything possible most promptly and efficiently". They also praised the captain and crew of Kimball for their rescue of the survivors.

==== Aftermath ====
Emperor was the final and second–largest shipwreck to occur at Isle Royale. She was also the largest shipwreck to have occurred on Lake Superior since the loss of the freighter Chester A. Congdon in 1918, and the deadliest since the sinking of the canaller Kamloops in 1927, both also at Isle Royale. The first dives to Emperor's wreck took place on June 12, 1947. They were conducted by Fowler, who made a total of three, roughly 30 minute dives to the wreck. In 1948, Canada Steamship Lines replaced Emperor with the freighter Burlington.

In 1975, sport divers from the Inland Divers Club of Duluth, Minnesota, discovered the preserved remains of a crew member near Emperor's engine room and reported it to the National Park Service. The body was missing its eyes, nose and arms from the elbow down. However, the clothes, facial features and hair all remained intact. In order to deter potential looters, the body was later reportedly sunk at the end of the stern by Canadian divers. Soon after, the remains of one additional crew member were discovered resting on a bunk; the disposition of this body is unknown. Although unverified, several other bodies are reported to have been found.

== Emperor wreck ==
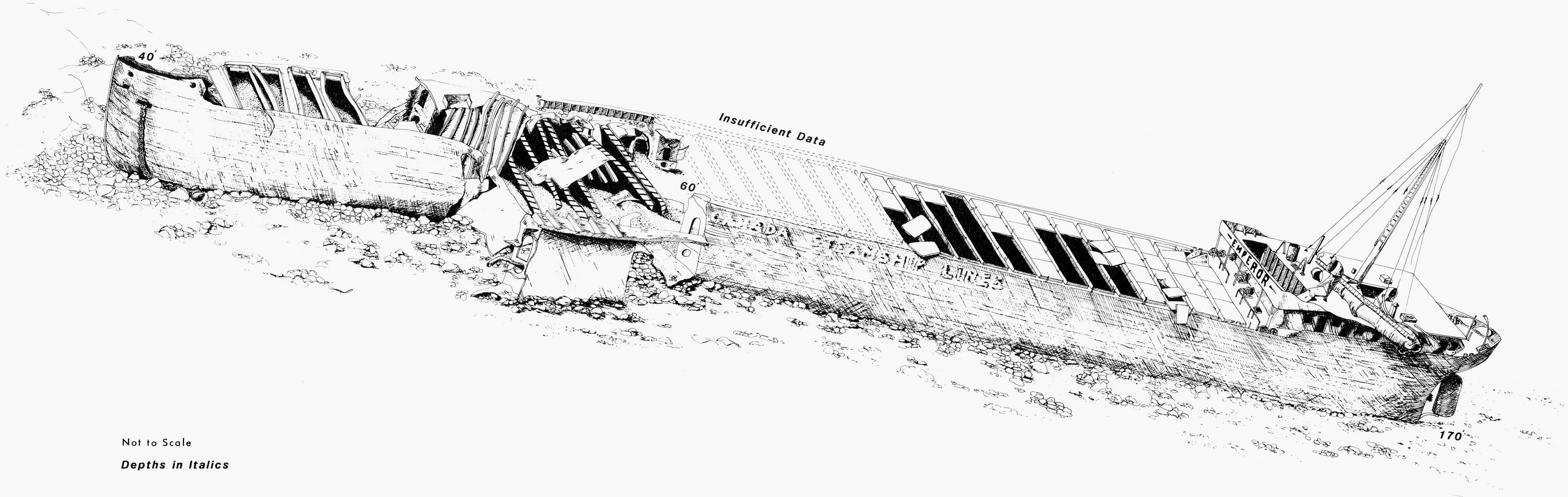
Diagram of Emperor's wreck

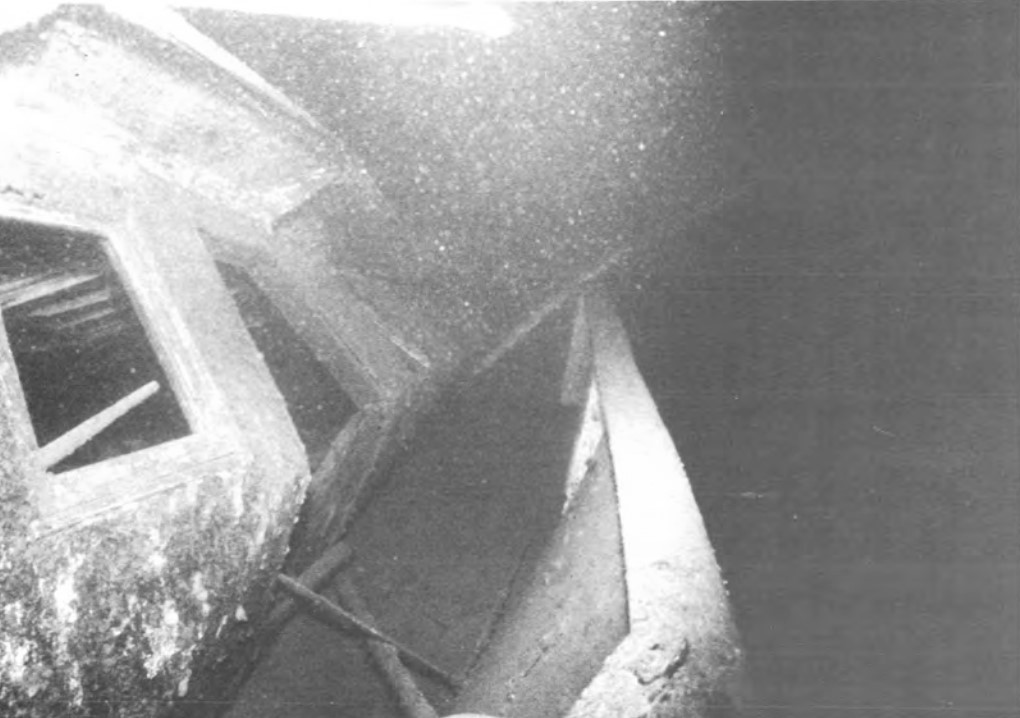
The collapsed port side of Emperor's stern cabin

The wreck of Emperor rests in between 25 feet (7.6 m) of water at the bow, and 175 feet (53.3 m) of water at the stern, in two partially attached sections. The bow has sustained severe damage, mostly due to the impact of ice, while the stern is intact. The bow section stretches from 25 feet (7.6 m) at the bow's tip, down into about 80 feet (24.4 m) of water, where the intact stern section starts. The bow section includes two 7,000 pound (3,175.1 kg) anchors, a windlass and chain locker, as well as five relatively intact cargo hatches. The stern features an intact and penetrable engine room, an intact mast, and a partially intact cabin. Emperor's boilers are undamaged, proving the night steward's account of a boiler explosion false. The roof on the port side of the cabin has partially collapsed, as the funnel (also present) fell on top of it with sufficient force to not only damage the roof, but also the bulkhead. There are 17 intact cargo hatches aft of the break in the hull. The propeller blades broke off as Emperor sank, leaving only the propeller hub and rudder. Her cargo holds still contain her cargo of iron ore. Wreckage from the canaller Dunelm which ran aground in 1910, but was freed, lies 100 yards (91.4 m) east of Emperor's bow.

Emperor's wreck was listed on the National Register of Historic Places on June 12, 1984. Between 1980 and 1985, Emperor was the second-most popular shipwreck at Isle Royale National Park, behind the excursion steamer America. However, as of 2009, she is Isle Royale's most frequently visited shipwreck, accounting for over 350 of the 1062 dives made to the wrecks in the park that year. A 70–year–old man died while exploring the stern section of Emperor's wreck in 100–150 feet (30.5–45.7 m) of water, on July 25, 2024.

== Sources ==
- "A Directory of Names, Pennant Numbers and Addresses of all Members of the Ship Masters' Association of the Great Lakes". Norwalk, Ohio: American Publishers Company. 1915.
- "British Whig (Kingston, ON), 10 Apr 1911". Kingston, Ontario: British Whig. 1911.
- "British Whig (Kingston, ON), 19 Oct 1911". Kingston, Ontario: British Whig. 1911.
- Bowlus, W. Bruce (2010). Iron Ore Transport on the Great Lakes: The Development of a Delivery System to Feed American Industry. Jefferson, North Carolina: McFarland & Company, Inc. ISBN 978-0-786433-26-1.
- Bree, Marlin (1988). In the Teeth of the Northeaster: A Solo Voyage on Lake Superior. Saint Paul, Minnesota: Marlor Press, Inc. ISBN 978-05-17564-49-3.
- Bugbee, Gordon P. (February 1962a). "Iron Merchant Ships: An Upper Lakes Centennial - Part One" (PDF). Detroit, Michigan: Great Lakes Maritime Institute.
- Bugbee, Gordon P. (March 1962b). "Iron Merchant Ships: An Upper Lakes Cenntenial – Part Two" (PDF). Detroit, Michigan: Great Lakes Maritime Institute.
- Carrell, Toni (1983). "Shipwrecks of Isle Royale National Park (Thematic Group)". Washington D.C.: National Park Service.
- Champion, Brandon (2024). "Scuba diver dies while exploring Lake Superior shipwreck near Isle Royale". Grand Rapids, Michigan: Mlive.
- "Choctaw Shipwreck Site National Register of Historic Places Registration Form" (PDF). Washington D.C.: National Park Service. 2018. Archived from the original (PDF) on January 1, 2019.
- "Echo Soundings: Marine News of 1913-1914". Amherstburg, Ontario: Amherstburg Echo. 1914.
- "Emperor". Bowling Green, Ohio: Bowling Green State University. 2021. Archived from the original on May 12, 2021.
- "Emperor (1911, Bulk Freighter)". Alpena, Michigan: Alpena County George N. Fletcher Public Library. 2021.
- "Emperor (Propeller), aground, 4 Jun 1947". Ontario, Canada: Maritime History of the Great Lakes. 1947.
- Gillham, Skip (1972). "Ship of the Month No.23: Renvoyle". Toronto, Ontario: Toronto Marine Historical Society.
- "Green's Marine Directory of the Great Lakes". Cleveland, Ohio: Osborn and Lange, Inc. 1939.
- Harrington, Steve (1998). Divers Guide to Michigan. St. Ignace, Michigan: Maritime Press & Great Lakes Diving Council, Inc. ISBN 978-0-9624-6299-3.
- Herriman, H. N. (1922). "American Bureau of Shipping – Great Lakes Department". Cleveland, Ohio: American Bureau of Shipping.
- Johnston, J. E. (1956). "Telescope – Volume 5, Number 6". Detroit, Michigan: Great Lakes Model Shipbuilders' Guild.
- Kohl, Cris (2005). The 100 Best Great Lakes Shipwrecks – Volume II. West Chicago, Illinois: Seawolf Communications. ISBN 978-0-9679-9766-7.
- Labadie, C. Patrick; Richards, Donald (1968). "Telescope – Volume 17, Number 8". Detroit, Michigan: Great Lakes Maritime Institute.
- Lee, Robert E. (1970). "Telescope – Volume 19, Number 2". Detroit, Michigan: Great Lakes Maritime Institute.
- Lee, Robert E. (1977). "Telescope – Volume 26, Number 5". Detroit, Michigan: Great Lakes Maritime Institute.
- Lenihan, Daniel J. (1987). "Submerged Cultural Resources Study: Isle Royale National Park" (PDF). Washington D.C.: National Park Service. Archived from the original (PDF) on July 17, 2023.
- Merryman, Ken (2021). "Emperor". Fridley, Minnesota: Superior Trips.
- "Ship of the Month No.144: Emperor". Toronto, Ontario: Toronto Marine Historical Society. 1986.
- Stonehouse, Frederick (1990) [1984]. Went Missing, II. Au Train, Michigan: Avery Color Studios. ISBN 978-0-932212-37-5.
- "Sunken Steamer Blocks Navigation". Buffalo, New York: The Buffalo News. 1911 – via Newspapers.com.
- "The Greenstone 2010" (PDF). Washington D.C.: National Park Service. 2010. Archived from the original (PDF) on August 6, 2011.
- "The Marine Review (Cleveland, OH), June 1911". Cleveland, Ohio: The Marine Review. 1911.
- "The Marine Review (Cleveland, OH), November 1911". Cleveland, Ohio: The Marine Review. 1911.
- "The Railway and Marine World (Toronto, ON), Jan. 1911, p. 89, 91". Toronto, Ontario. 1911.
- "The Railway and Marine World (Toronto, ON), Feb. 1911, p. 188-89". Toronto, Ontario. 1911.
- "The Railway and Marine World (Toronto, ON), June 1911, pp. 571, 573". Toronto, Ontario. 1911.
- "The Railway and Marine World (Toronto, ON), November 1911, pp. 1085-86". Toronto, Ontario. 1911.
- "The Railway and Marine World (Toronto, ON), December 1911, pp. 1187". Toronto, Ontario. 1911.
- Thompson, Mark L. (1994). Queen of the Lakes. Detroit, Michigan: Wayne State University Press. ISBN 0-8143-2393-6.
- Thompson, Mark L. (2004). Graveyard of the Lakes. Detroit, Michigan: Wayne State University Press. ISBN 978-0-814332-26-9.
- "Toronto Telegram (Toronto, ON), 26 Aug 1932". Toronto, Ontario: Toronto Telegram. 1932.
- "Toronto Telegram (Toronto, ON), 12 Dec 1936". Toronto, Ontario: Toronto Telegram. 1936.
- "Toronto Telegram (Toronto, ON), 19 Dec 1936". Toronto, Ontario: Toronto Telegram. 1936.
