= Emperor (ship) =

Several merchant ships have been named Emperor, or a variation of Emperor.

- Emperor (1853 ship) (originally named Leopard), Canadian (later U.S.) schooner, U.S. Official No. 8500. Wrecked on Lake Ontario, near Oswego, New York, in November 1870.
- Emperor, British steam sloop. Wrecked at Fécamp, Pas-de-Calais, France on 9 October 1857.
- SS Emperor, Canadian steamer, bulk freighter, Official No. 126654. Wrecked on Isle Royale in Lake Superior on 4 June 1947.

== See also ==
- SS Emperor of St. John (originally named Canadian Warrior), Canadian propeller, package freighter, Official No. 140960. Wrecked at Ballantyne Cove, Cape George, Nova Scotia, on 7 December 1926.
- SS Emperor of Halifax (originally Canadian Signaller, later Skjoldheim and Polyana), Canadian (later Norwegian) propeller, package freighter. Torpedoed by German submarine U-103 in the Atlantic Ocean on 25 April 1941.
- SS Emperor of Fredericton (originally Canadian Sower), Canadian (later Japanese) propeller, package freighter, Official No. 141487. Torpedoed by an American submarine near Po-hai on 10 February 1945.
- SS Emperor of Montreal (originally Canadian Trader, later Gilda Scuderi), Canadian (later Italian and U.S.) propeller, package freighter, Official No. 141376. Lost in November 1928, while travelling from Seattle, Washington, to Kobe, Japan.
- SS Emperor of Port McNicoll (originally Canadian Adventurer, later Nootka), Canadian (later Peruvian) propeller, package freighter, Official No. 141486. Scrapped in Peru in 1960.
- SS Emperor of Havana (originally Canadian Sailor, later Nichiyei Maru and Nitei Maru), Canadian (later Japanese) propeller, package freighter, Official No. 141377. Foundered in the Yellow Sea on 11 October 1942.
