= J. B. Ford =

Bulk freighter on the Great Lakes of US and Canada

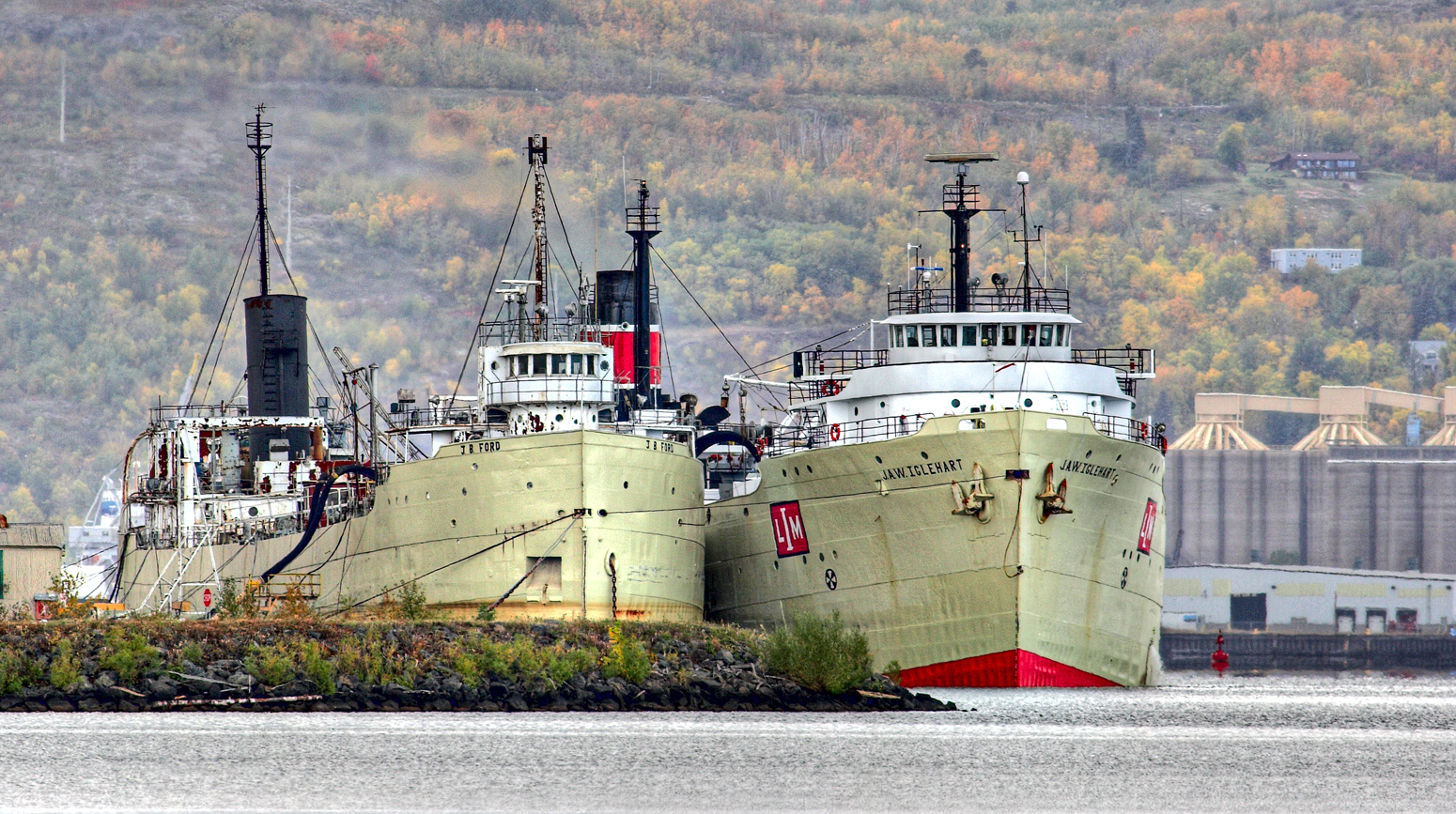
- J. B. Ford (left) in use for cement storage in 2006. (J. A. W. Iglehart on the right)

History

United States
- Name: J. B. Ford
- Namesake: J. B. Ford
- Owner: Lafarge
- Operator: Lafarge
- Port of registry: Detroit, Michigan
- Builder: American Shipbuilding Company
- Launched: 12 December 1903
- Identification: IMO number: 5166378; Callsign: WA4454
- Fate: Scrapped 2021

General characteristics
- Class & type: Lake freighter
- Length: 440 ft (130 m)
- Beam: 50 ft (15 m)
- Draft: 28 ft (8.5 m)
- Installed power: Two Scotch marine boilers
- Propulsion: Triple expansion steam

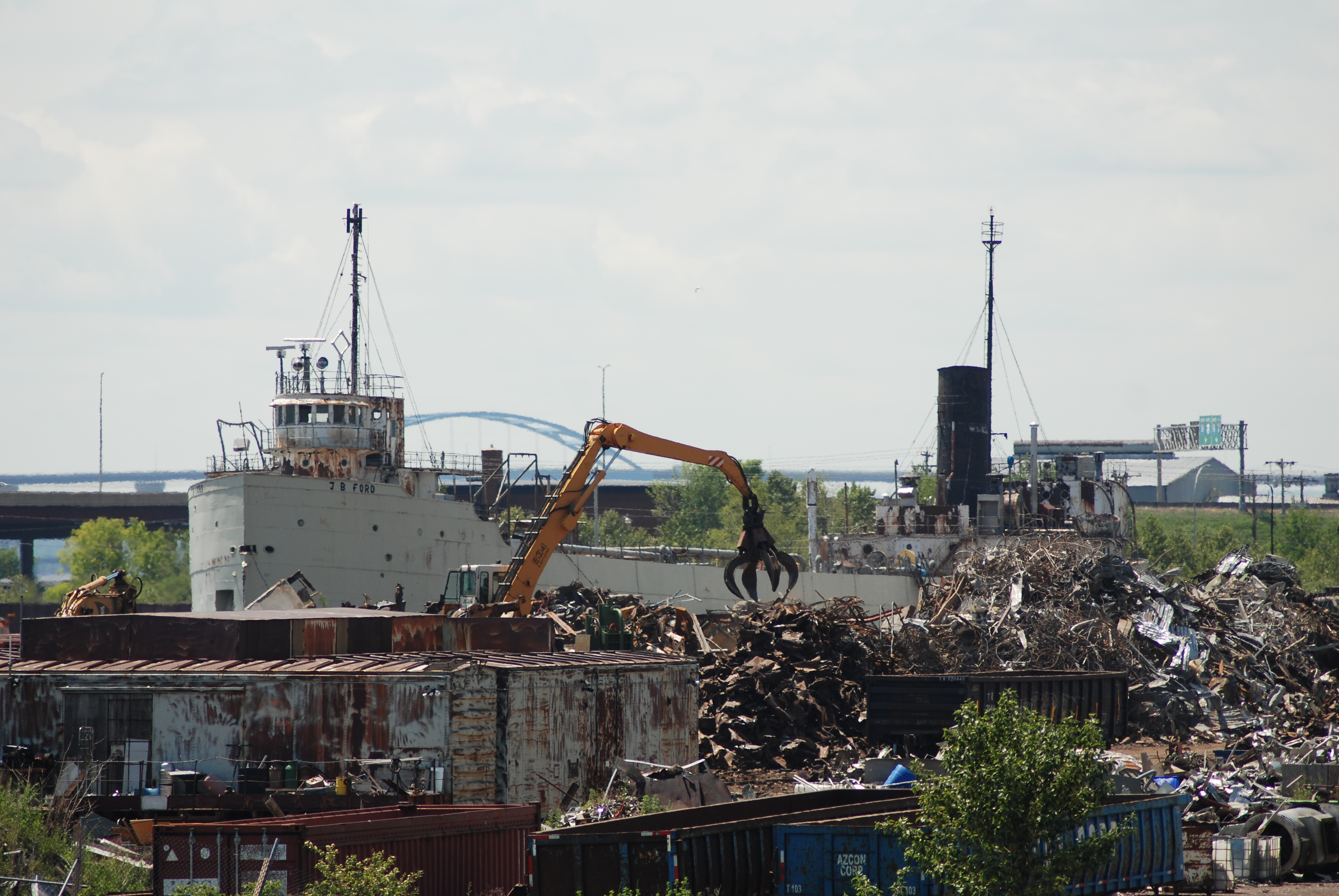
J. B. Ford at Azcon scrap dock in Duluth, Minnesota, on 27 June 2018

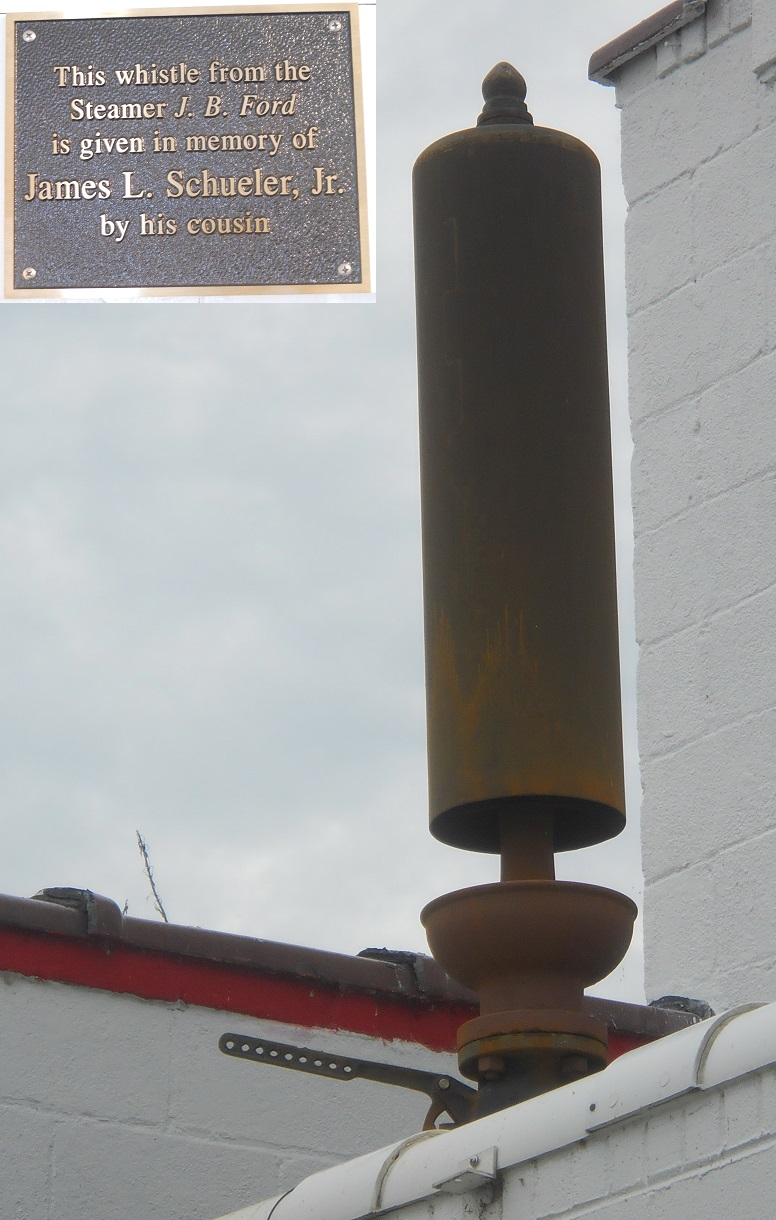
The main steam whistle from the steamship J. B. Ford. The insert shows a plaque inside the building that tells whom the whistle honors. Guest of the museum may salute passing lake freighters using this whistle. The Harsens Island Historical Society was gifted the whistle in 2017. Harsens Island is North of Detroit in Michigan.

J. B. Ford was a steamship bulk freighter that saw service for 112 years on the Great Lakes of the United States and Canada.

The ship was launched at Lorain, Ohio on 12 December 1903 as Edwin F. Holmes. The freighter was named in honor of Edwin Francis Holmes, an investor in the Hawgood & Avery Transit Co. and a director of the Hawgood & Avery Fleet in 1904. Edwin F. Holmes sailed in the Commonwealth Steamship Fleet until 1911 when she was transferred to the Acme Transit Fleet (another of the Hawgood fleets). At the time of its scrapping was the oldest intact lake freighter still afloat.

The ship was 440 feet (130 m) long with a 50-foot (15 m) beam, and a depth of 28 feet (8.5 m). It was powered by a 1,500-horsepower (1,100 kW) triple-expansion steam engine, fed by two coal-fired Scotch marine boilers. J. B. Ford had 12 hatches feeding into 4 cargo compartments.

Although J. B. Ford had not seen powered service since 15 November 1985, it served as a stationary cement storage and transfer vessel in South Chicago, Chicago, from 1987 until 2001. The vessel was towed to Superior, Wisconsin to serve in the same capacity. The vessel continued in this duty until 2006 when J. A. W. Iglehart, former fleet mate of J. B. Ford, was retired from service and took over the duties at Superior.

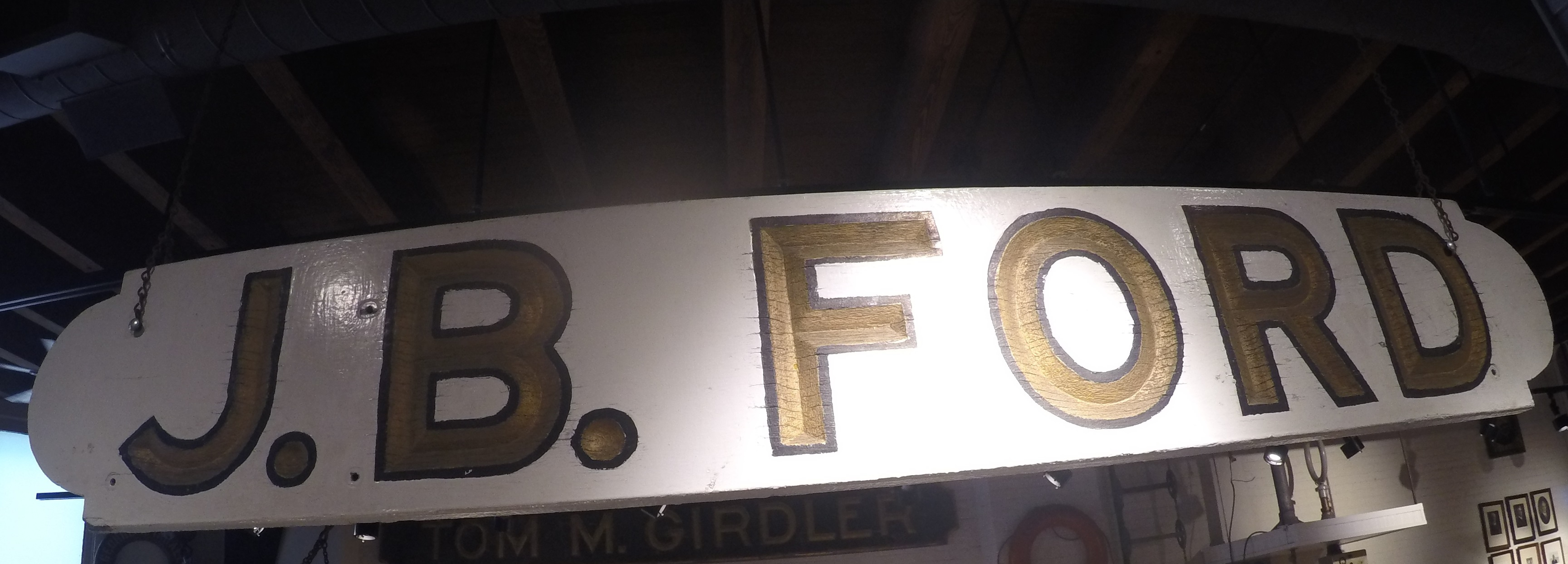
Wooden nameboard from J. B. Ford on display at the Buffalo Harbor Museum in Buffalo, New York

J. B. Ford was moved to a storage dock awaiting orders to scrap the vessel. The scrapping of E. M. Ford, and the attempts to save that ship in 2008, generated public interest in the old steamers. In 2010 the Great Lakes Steamship Society (GLSS) was formed (and soon thereafter incorporated) with the intention of acquiring and preserving items of maritime heritage on the Great Lakes, with their first goal the preservation of J. B. Ford. The GLSS achieved 501c3 non profit status in 2011 and worked to save the vessel until July 2014. When the GLSS effort began in 2010, the vessel's owner, Lafarge, deferred scrapping the J. B. Ford to allow the group time to get organized and put a real effort forward to preserve the ship. The effort failed due to increasing cost to stabilize and preserve the vessel, combined with a loss of interest in preserving it. As of July 2014, the GLSS was still working with the vessel's owners to recover artifacts and significant items from the vessel, particularly the forward cabins.

J. B. Ford was towed to the Azcon scrapyard on 9 October 2015. On the afternoon of 1 March 2021, the ship caught fire when a spark ignited wood in a cabin area while crews were dismantling it.

== Notable events ==
- December 12, 1903: Launched in Lorain, Ohio by American Shipbuilding Company as the Edwin F. Holmes
- January 22, 1904 : Work on fitting out the new vessel was delayed by major flooding on the Black River; the Holmes broke loose from her moorings in the current, and was pushed into the opposite bank. She was not freed until 5 February 1904 when she was returned to the fit-out dock and work continued.
- July 19, 1904 : The Steamer Edwin F. Holmes was backing away from the Northern Coal dock un-assisted by tugs when a wind blew her into the Booth's Line passenger Steamer America crushing in five of her cabins. The America was not damaged below the water line so she left Duluth, MN with supplies to make repairs underway. The next day the Holmes left Duluth, MN.
- November 27-December 1, 1905 : While sailing in Lake Huron with a load of coal for Duluth, MN a tremendous storm hit the region. The Holmes made it safely to the Soo Locks but she continued on, not knowing the full intensity of the storm. The Holmes was reported overdue on 30 November 1905. Although her identical sister ship, the Umbria, sustained heavy damage to her forward cabins and navigation centre (requiring the crew to steer the vessel from the emergency steering station at the stern of the vessel as it limped into Duluth), the Holmes arrived undamaged in Duluth, MN on 1 December, sailing into the Duluth piers past the broken and battered wreck of the Pittsburgh Steamship Companies' SS Mataafa which had been wrecked trying to enter the piers. She had grounded and broken her back on the beach just a few yards from the shore. Nine crew-members of the Mataafa perished in the wreck, giving history the name Mataafa Storm.
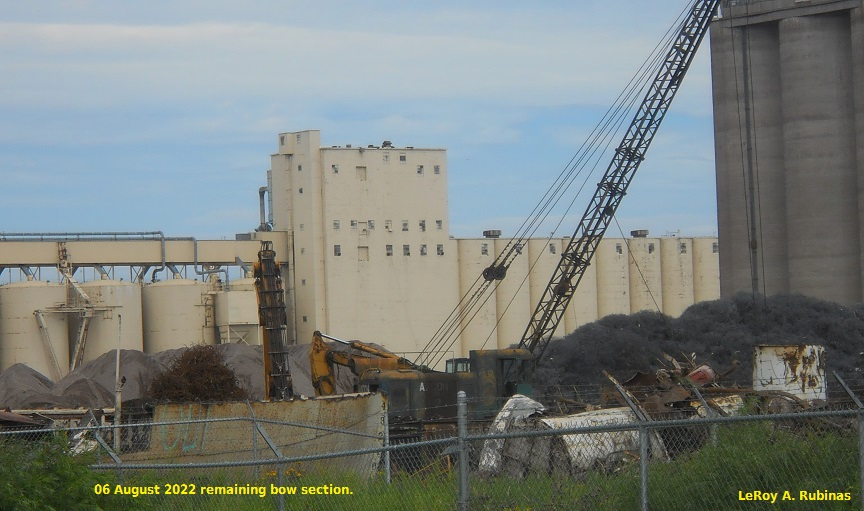
- The bow section of J. B. Ford on 6 August 2022. By the end of August none of this vessel would remain floating.
  November 6–11, 1913 : Two powerful storm fronts collided over the region creating a massive storm system. Powering through the first part of the storm the Holmes reached safety of the Locks. A day-long lull in the storm tricked many seasoned mariners into thinking the storm was over, and after venturing out into Lake Huron, weather conditions deteriorated to the worst on record, and the storm ended up causing massive losses. Twelve vessels sank with no survivors, 32 vessels were blown ashore around the region, and seven of these were completely destroyed. On the lakes 235 sailors lost their lives, with at least 36 more killed on land, making this the worst storm ever to hit the region. To date no storm has equaled the Great White Hurricane of 1913, in terms of either lake weather conditions, or loss of life and property.
- October 9, 2015: Under tow by the Helen H. and the Minnesota, She departed the Superior Municipal Dock bound for Azcon Metals in Duluth Minnesota for scrapping.

== See also ==
- Great Lakes Storm of 1913
