= List of shipwrecks of Isle Royale =

The List of shipwrecks of Isle Royale includes more than 25 ships that have been sunk near Isle Royale in Lake Superior (North America). Isle Royale has been an obstacle to shipping on Lake Superior since the earliest days.

Upon its reefs, more than 25 major wrecks have occurred. Some were refloated, but most never left.

== Early wrecks ==
Still to be found beneath the waves of Lake Superior are the wooden sidewheeler, Cumberland (1877); bulk freighter, Chester Congdon (1918); and the first 10,000-long-ton (10,000 t) Canadian wheat packet, Emperor (1947). Earlier, the Kamloops which "went missing" in 1927 was found on the northern shore of the island in 1977.

The earliest recorded wrecks were the Madeline (1839) and the Siskiwit (1840) of the American Fur Company. Many smaller French "ships" were reported upon Lake Superior in the 18th century, which were gone before the English arrival in 1763. Along the north shore of the lake, the most celebrated wreck is that of the America which served as a connection between Isle Royale and the mainland and was a highway from Duluth, Minnesota, to Port Arthur, Ontario.

== The 3 C's of Isle Royale ==
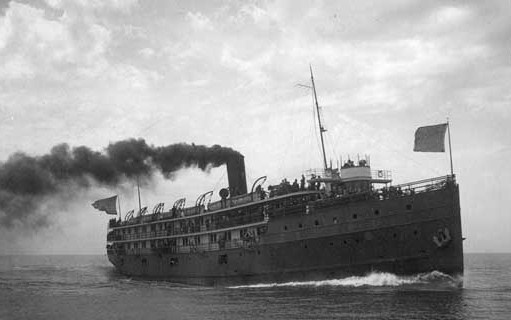
S.S. Puritan (George M. Cox)

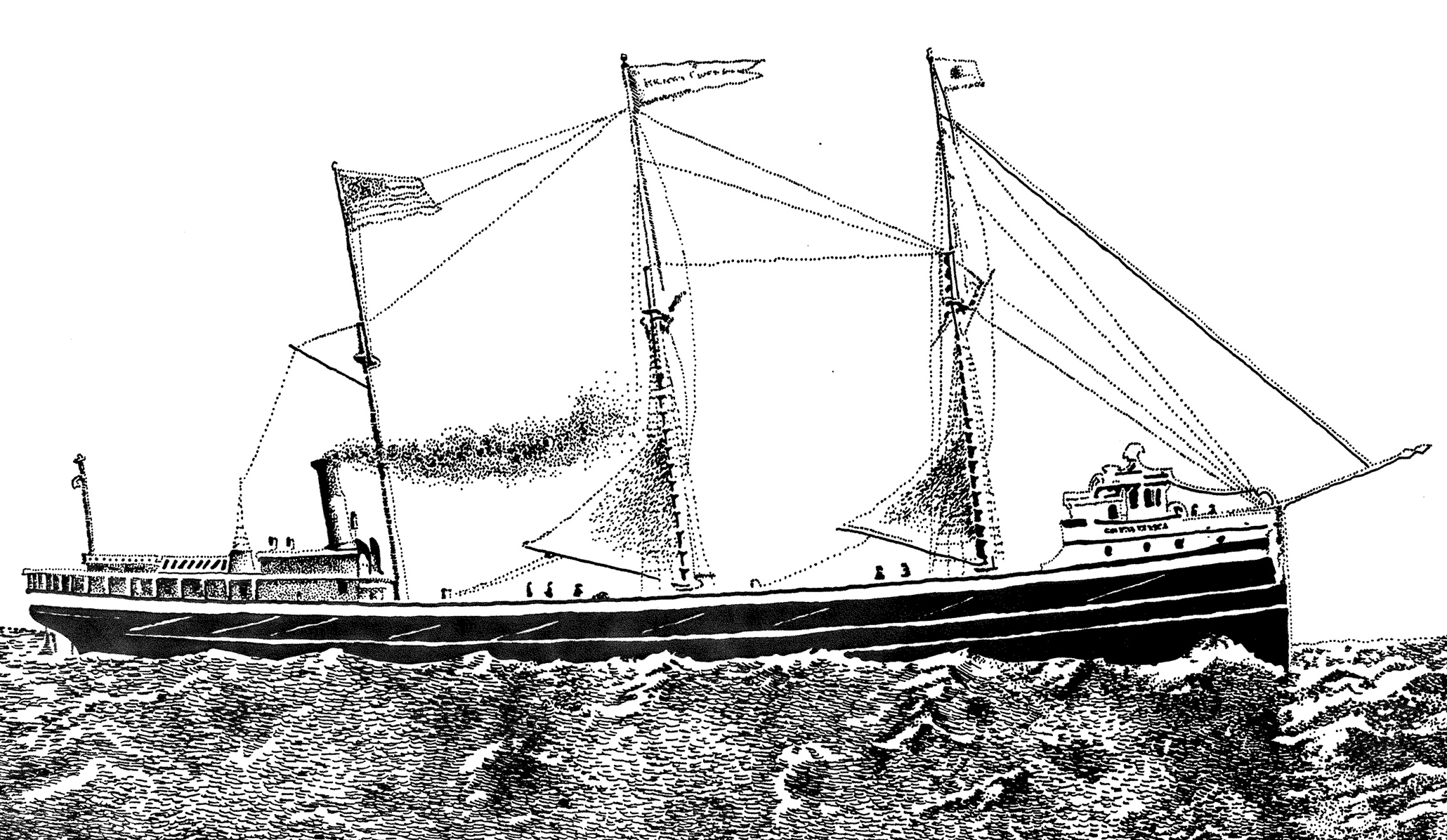
SS Henry Chisholm

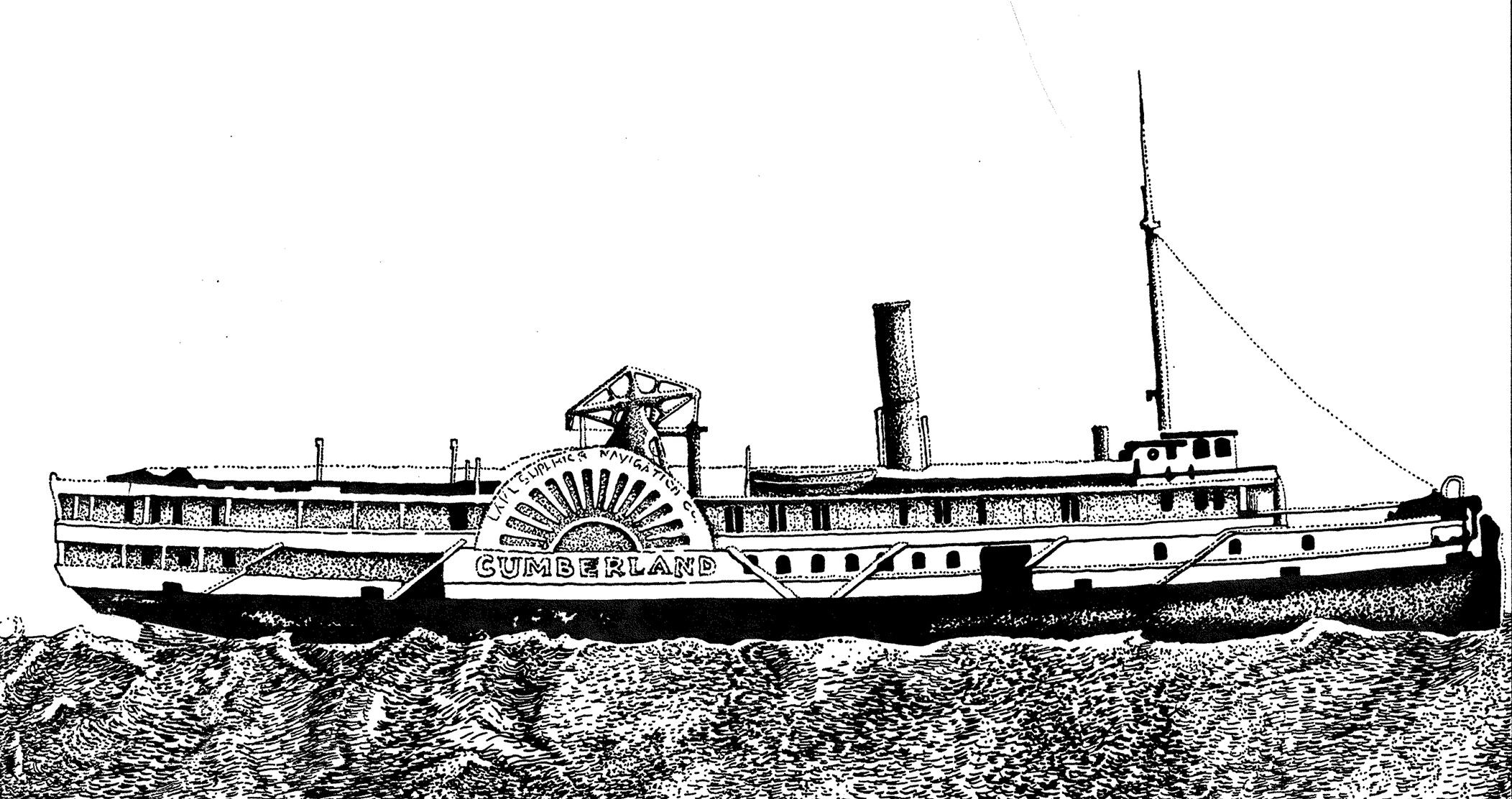
PS Cumberland

To the west and south of Isle Royale is the Rock of Ages Lighthouse. Built in 1908, the light has provided the ships of Lake Superior with assurances that the Rock of Ages reef would be found by the captain, before the reef found the ship. But that was too late or too little for the three residents lying atop the reef.

The Passenger Steamer Cumberland had spent July 21–23, 1877 aground on a bar near Nipigon, Ontario, just prior to heading out into the clear lake from Thunder Bay. She was headed to Duluth, running in clear weather with a light breeze out of the south, when she ran hard upon the reef. A salvage crew tried to float the ship off the reef, but gave up when the weather turned sour in early August. The 'elements' of the lake have left only scattered sections of her hull, sidewheel and anchor from 20 to 140 feet (6 to 43 m) deep on the Rock of Ages Reef.

Nearby to the southwest lies the Henry Chisholm. Sunday, October 1898 she was headed east towards the Soo when her tow separated in a storm north of Copper Harbor, Michigan. On the morning of the 20th, while preparing to begin a search of the Isle Royale harbors for the tow Martin, the Chisholm ran hard atop the reef. So badly damaged was the hull that the salvage crew estimated that it would take 8–10 pumps to lower the water in the hold. With bad weather expected at any time, it was abandoned to the lake. Today, she rests amongst the remains of the Cumberland, the steam engine being the identifiable remains.

To the east lies the George M. Cox. It was on the night of May 28, 1933, that the Cox struck the reef in a heavy fog. The Cox had been headed for Fort William and was making a good 10 statute miles per hour (16 km/h) in a calm lake when she struck. The impact was so great that the boilers ripped loose. The craft then settled onto the reef with a 90-degree tilt. Many pictures have been seen of the Cox, with its bow standing high out of the water, and the stern lapped by the waves. Again, the damage exceeded the ability of salvagers to remove her from the grave.

Each of these ships can still be visited by divers who brave the temperatures, which get as low as 34 °F (1 °C).

== The America ==
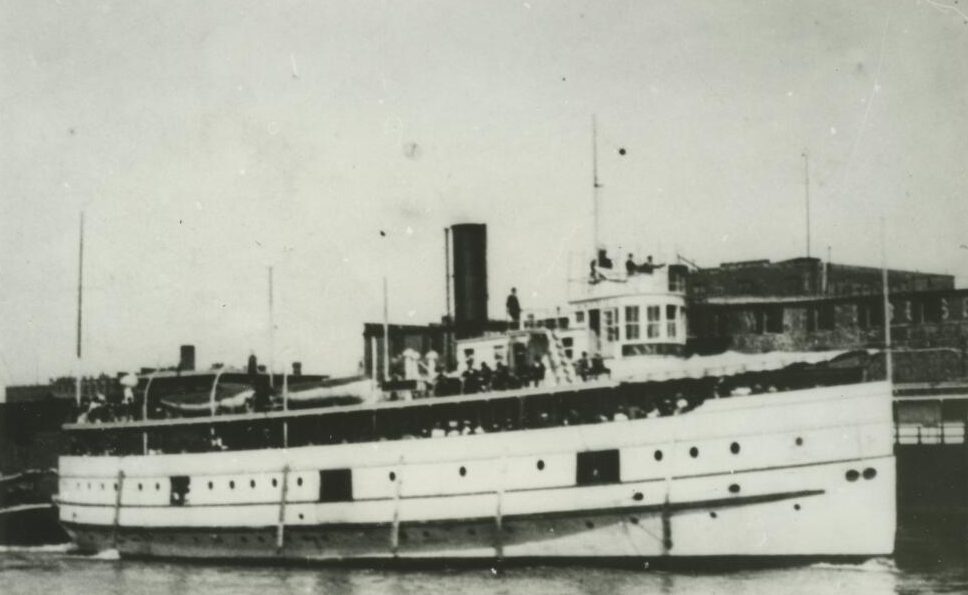
SS America

"STEAMER IS SUNK WHEN IT STRIKES ISLE ROYALE REEF"
"All aboard are Rescued; Few Details of Accident are Given. Duluth, Minn. June 7 (AP) An old passenger steamer, the AMERICA, is lying on the bottom of Lake Superior tonight under 17 fathoms [31 m], of water. Its crew and passengers, about 45 in all, were taken off Isle Royale tonight, where they went when the ship sank this morning." --Houghton Mining Gazette (June 8, 1928)

The America was built in Detroit by a Michigan City, Indiana, and Detroit, Michigan, partnership for excursion trips between Michigan City and Chicago, Illinois. Only three years later, in 1901, the America was operating on Lake Erie, when Alfred Booth of A. Booth Co. of Chicago began to negotiate for ownership of this modern and fast ship (19 knots (35 km/h; 22 mph)) for the North Shore route out of Duluth, Minnesota. On April 26, 1902, the America left her berth on the lower lakes for a final home on Lake Superior.

Capt. "Fog King" Hector became her first captain on Superior. Capt. Hector began his days on Lake Superior at 17 in 1863 operating a small fishing operation. The "Fog King" was completely familiar with the north shore. He was seldom late on his run, regardless of the weather. Most of the America's problems in those years came from its need to enter civilization. In 1902, it collided with the Duluth Ship Canal; in 1904, the anchor from a bulk freighter ripped through the upper staterooms while berthed next to a grain terminal in Duluth, and in 1910, another ship was struck by the America rendering major damage to both. It was this collision, which allowed the America to be repaired and enlarged from its original 486 tons to 937 tons.

The only major incident during Capt. Hector's tenure took place off the Susie Islands. On June 10, 1907, the America had just stopped to drop off supplies at either Grand Portage or the old Parkerville dock in the Susie Islands. As the crew was putting the final packages into place, a new 2nd Porter, Harvey Holler (16 years old), stepped backwards and out the open gangway. The crewmembers never saw him again, despite their attempts to search the waters.

The year 1911 saw the newly lengthened America traveling up the North Shore with a new captain. Capt. Edward C. "Indian" Smith was to be the final captain of the ship. Capt. Smith had worked the other Booth boat, Hiram R. Dixon, and the under Hector on the America. It was said that on the foggiest days, you would hear the ship's whistle and know to head to the rendezvous point. Standing in your small skiff, unable to see more than 15 or 20 feet, you would wait for the America. Then from the fog would come the bow, and the America would come to rest alongside your skiff with barely a ripple. And no sooner had it come to rest, than the engines would pound and the America would slip back into the fog, headed for the next meeting along the shore.

Capt. Smith only once in the first 14 years brought the America to a problem. In 1914, she ran aground on Fisherman's Point in Two Harbors. This time, the damage was minor, compared to the rock Capt. Hector found in Burlington Harbor (Two Harbors) in 1909. The last few years found the America stuck upon a reef or bar each year. On May 28, 1925, she went aground on Scott's Point in Colville. The following year, she went aground in the Kaministiquia River at Fort William, Ontario. And on July 21, 1927, she rammed into a tug at Port Arthur. Each time, the damage was greater and the repairs more expensive.

On June 6, 1928, the America steamed through the Duluth Ship Canal. Later that day, she landed in Grand Marais after making the routine stops along the coast. After clearing cargo and passengers, the America rounded the breakwall heading for Isle Royale. Apparently, the routine was to continue north along the shore and return through Isle Royale, stopping at the fish houses before returning to Duluth.

But on this night, the America was carrying several passengers bound for Washington Island. At 3 a.m. on June 7, she nosed out of the Singer Hotel Dock on Washington Island. Heading for North Gap and open water, the Captain retired and let First Mate Wicks and a helmsman take the watch. Within minutes, the ship bumped over a reef, puncturing holes in the single bottom. Returning to the bridge, where the mate was signaling the alarm to the crew and passenger, Capt. Smith ordered the helmsman, Fred Nelson, to head towards a gravel beach before the ship floundered and lost headway.

Thirty yards off the beach, the America hit another reef and came to an abrupt halt. Meanwhile, the crew in the engine room greased the engine to prevent rust and improve salvage and the topside crew began to move the passengers to the lifeboats. Within an hour and a half of leaving Washington Island, the crew and passengers were on their way back in lifeboats. They met a small fleet of fishing boats coming to the sound of the whistle.

The America came to rest with the bow standing out of the water and the stern and midships reaching into the depths. A. Booth and Sons elected not to salvage the America, probably due to the completion of Minnesota Trunk Route I (US 61). The new road cut the cost of transportation along the shore making it unprofitable to operate a ship. The next year in September, 1929, Capt. Cornelius Flynn of the Duluth Salvage Company bought the rights to the America. The winter of '28–29 had done minor damage to the upper cabins. But before he could get a crew to the site, winter set in and kept them at home. The following spring, the ice had sheared off the cabins at the waterline. The decrease in weight and the upward pressure of the ice floated the wreck and it settled beneath the surface. Today, it can be seen 4 to 85 feet (1 to 26 m) below the water.

== Frank Rockefeller ==
On the night of November 3, 1905, the Frank Rockefeller ran aground in Rainbow Cove during a blizzard. The very next day, a salvage crew was on the way to float her free. She continued in service hauling many bulk products until 1969. At that time, she was retired by her owners who called her the Meteor, a whaleback designed ship now on display in Superior, Wisconsin.
