= SS D. R. Hanna =

552-foot steel freighter that sank on Lake Huron in 1919

Coordinates: 45°05.05′N 83°05.193′W

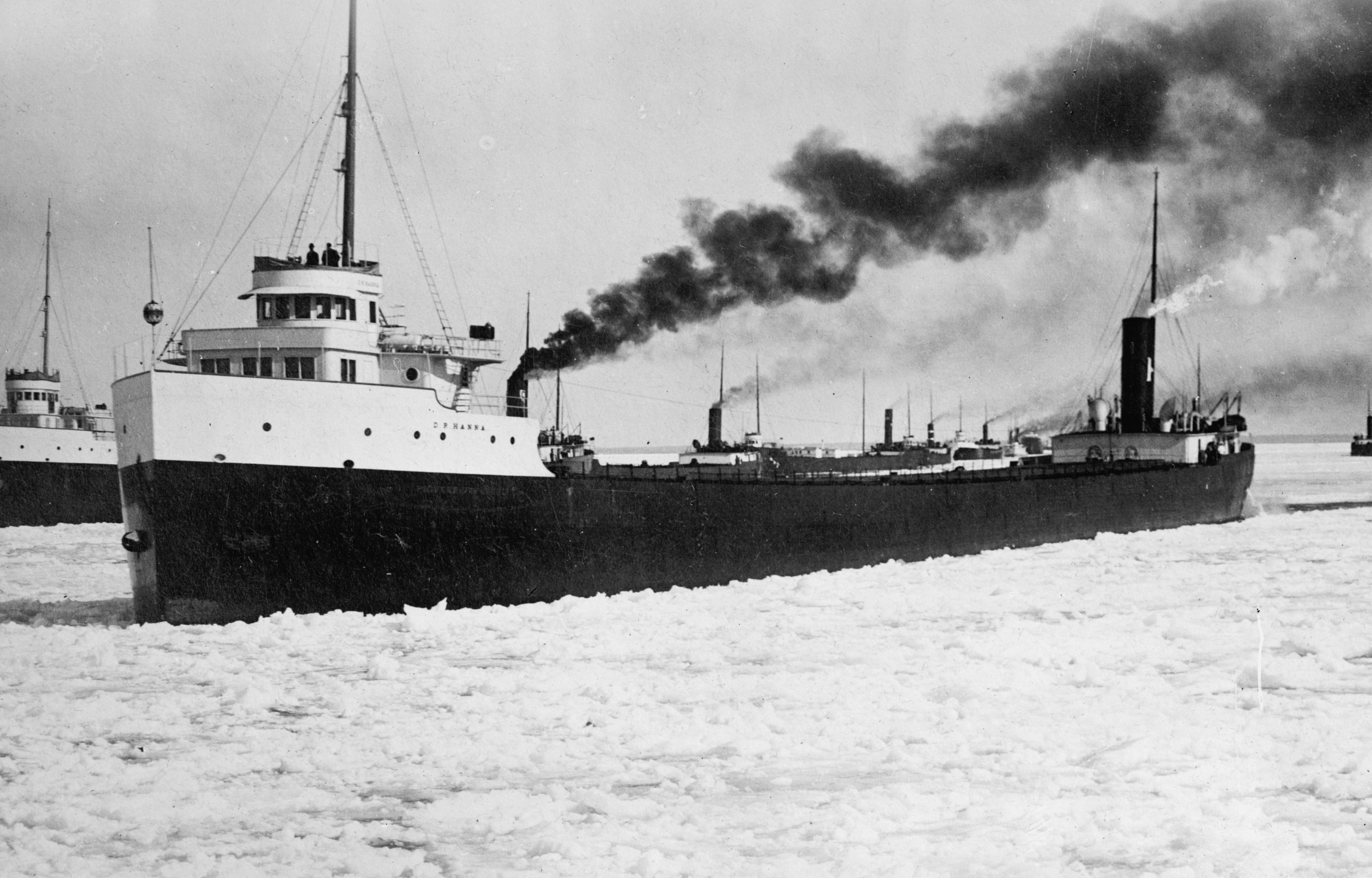
- D. R. Hanna underway

History

United States
- Name: D. R. Hanna
- Operator: Pioneer Steamship Company
- Port of registry: United States, Fairport, Ohio
- Builder: American Ship Building Company of Lorain, Ohio
- Yard number: 346
- Launched: October 20, 1906
- In service: November 12, 1906
- Out of service: May 16, 1919
- Identification: U.S. Registry #203676
- Fate: Rammed by the steamer Quincy A. Shaw in heavy fog off Thunder Bay Island on Lake Huron

General characteristics
- Type: Lake freighter
- Tonnage: 7,023 GRT; 5,491 NRT
- Length: 552 ft (168 m)
- Beam: 56 ft (17 m)
- Height: 31 ft (9.4 m)
- Installed power: 2x Scotch marine boilers
- Propulsion: 1,760 hp (1,310 kW) triple expansion steam engine
- Capacity: 10.000 tons
- Crew: 31

SS D. R. Hanna was a 552-foot (168 m) long American Great Lakes freighter that operated on the Great Lakes from November 12, 1906 to her sinking on May 16, 1919 after a collision with Quincy A. Shaw. D. R. Hanna was like many other freighters, and was used to haul bulk cargoes such as iron ore, coal and grain.

== History ==
D. R. Hanna (Official number 203676) was a product of the American Ship Building Company of Lorain, Ohio and was built for the Pioneer Steamship Company (Hutchinson & Company, Mgr.) of Fairport, Ohio. She had a length of 552 feet (168 m), a beam of 56 feet (17 m) and a height of 31 feet (9.4 m). She was powered by a 1,760-horsepower (1,310 kW) triple expansion steam engine and fueled by two coal-fired Scotch marine boilers. She had a gross register tonnage of 7,023 tons and a net register tonnage of 5,491 tons. She was launched on October 20, 1906 as hull number #346.

On September 1, 1910 D. R. Hanna collided with the steamer Harvey H. Brown. D. R. Hanna was sent to Detroit, Michigan for temporary repairs. On September 29, 1910 D. R. Hanna sailed to Cleveland, Ohio. Harvey H. Brown was badly damaged and it did not sail at all in that shipping season.

On October 13, 1915 D. R. Hanna had 37 feet (11 m) of her foremast knocked off when she struck the Superior Avenue high level bridge in Cleveland. She had a new foremast installed in Detroit.

On May 19, 1916 D. R. Hanna ran aground near the Little Rapids Cut after her steering gear failed. She was temporarily repaired and sailed to Chicago, Illinois for repairs.

On September 6, 1918 D. R. Hanna ran aground on the Detour Shoal on Lake Huron. She was bound for Indiana Harbor, Indiana with a cargo of iron ore. The steam barge F.T. Newman was sent to assist D. R. Hanna. Meanwhile, the 266-foot (81 m) long freighter LaSalle ran aground and the steam barge Reliance was sent to her aid. As soon as Reliance freed LaSalle she went to free D. R. Hanna. After she was freed, D. R. Hanna sailed to Indiana Harbor and unloaded her cargo; after unloading, D. R. Hanna was taken to the Ecorse, Michigan yard of the Great Lakes Engineering Works where she was placed in dry dock She damaged between 50 and 60 of her steel hull plates, her stern post and her rudder stock. She also cracked her tail shaft.

== Final voyage ==
On May 16, 1919 D. R. Hanna was bound from Duluth, Minnesota for Buffalo, New York with 377,000 bushels of wheat in her cargo hold when she was rammed by Quincy A. Shaw in heavy fog. Quincy A. Shaw was upbound with coal at the time the collision occurred. Soon after the collision D. R. Hanna rolled over and sank. Her crew were rescued by Quincy A. Shaw. There were no deaths. The cargo of D. R. Hanna was valued at $840,000 (roughly $15,000,000 in 2025), the insurance loss was set at $421,000.

== D. R. Hanna today ==
The remains of D. R. Hanna rest in 130 feet (40 m) of water about six miles (9.7 km) off the Thunder Bay Island Light. Her wreck was located upside down in October 1919. The wreck of D. R. Hanna in part of the Thunder Bay National Marine Sanctuary and Underwater Preserve and is also the largest wreck in the underwater preserve. The closest wreck of a steam-powered freighter is the wreck of Isaac M. Scott which was lost during the White Hurricane of 1913.
