= SS America (1898) =

Steam packet wrecked off Isle Royale in Lake Superior

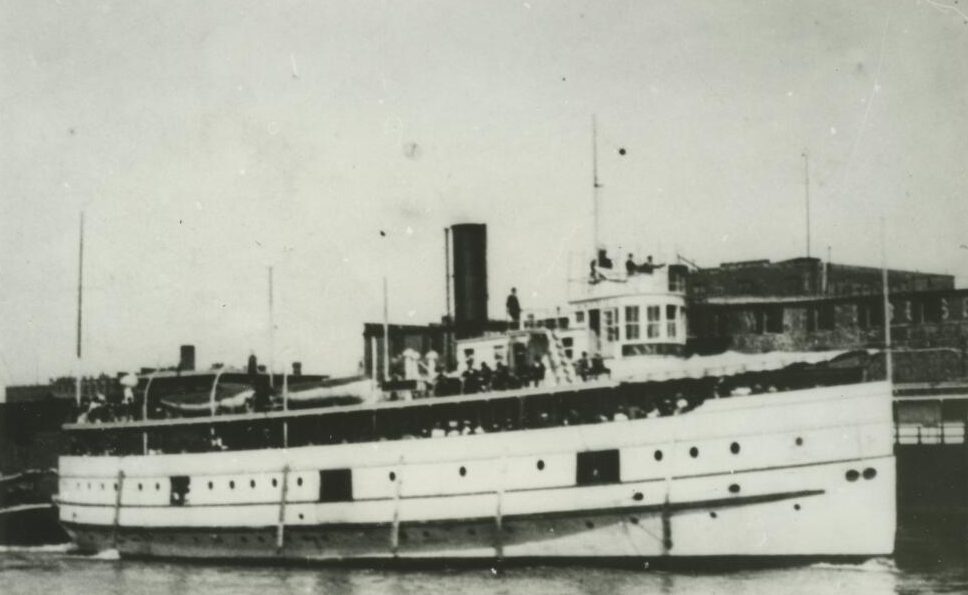
- The America circa 1900

History
- Name: America
- Operator: Booth Fisheries Company
- Builder: Detroit Dry Dock Company
- Launched: 2 April 1898
- Fate: Sank 7 June 1928

General characteristics
- Type: steel freighter
- Length: 183 ft (56 m)
- Beam: 31 feet
- Depth: 11 ft (3.4 m)
- Installed power: 700HP
- Propulsion: triple expansion steam engine
- Notes: Official No. 107367
- AMERICA
- U.S. National Register of Historic Places
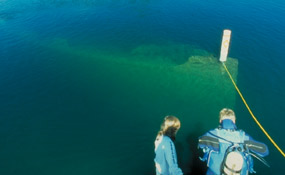
- Divers preparing to explore the America

- Location within Michigan Location within the United States
- Location: North Gap of Washington Harbor, Isle Royale National Park, Michigan
- Coordinates: 47°53′37.9″N 89°13′20.6″W
- Area: 5.7 acres (2.3 ha)
- Built: 1898
- MPS: Shipwrecks of Isle Royale National Park TR
- NRHP reference No.: 84001708
- Added to NRHP: June 14, 1984

America was a packet boat transporting passengers, mail, and packages between settlements along the North Shore of Lake Superior, an inland sea in central North America. Built in 1898, America sank in Washington Harbor off the shore of Isle Royale in 1928, where the hull still remains. The wreck was placed on the National Register of Historic Places in 1984.

== History ==
America (Official No. 107367) was a steel-hulled ship, built by the Detroit Dry Dock Company in Wyandotte at what is today the Wyandotte shores golf course and launched on April 2, 1898. The ship was 184 feet long, 31 feet wide, and 11 feet in depth. She had a gross tonnage of 486 tons and a net of 283 tons. She was powered by a triple expansion steam engine and two Scotch boilers, manufactured by the Dry Dock Engine Works, delivering 700HP.

Less than a month after her launch, America began a daily run, transporting passengers and packages on Lake Michigan between Chicago and Michigan City, Indiana. The ship remained on this run until 1901; in 1902 she was purchased by the Booth Steamship Company and transferred to service in Lake Superior. There, the ship served as a communications link for the western portion of Lake Superior, running three voyages per week among Duluth, Minnesota, Isle Royale, and Thunder Bay, Ontario and numerous small communities in between. The ship carried supplies in and fish catch out, as well as moving mail and passengers.

America had a number of accidents; the first one barely two weeks after she arrived in Duluth, when the ship ran into an ice floe and stove in her bow. In 1904, she ran too close to the steamer Edwin F. Holmes, destroying five staterooms, and in 1909 she ran aground.

In 1909, the Booth Steamship Company failed and a new company, the Booth Fisheries Company, took over operation of the failed company's assets, including America. In 1911, America was lengthened to 183 feet, increasing the gross and net tonnages to 937 tons and 593 tons respectively. The beam and depth remained the same. The rework added 12 more staterooms, bringing the total to 51, of which 43 were reserved for passengers. In 1914, management of the ship was taken over by the United States & Dominion Transportation Company, a subsidiary of Booth.

Also in 1914, America again ran aground, taking considerable damage. On 7 June 1924, she struck a reef, capsized, and sank off Isle Royale, Michigan; all 47 people aboard survived, and she was refloated, repaired, and returned to service. In 1926, she collided with another steamer, and in 1927 rammed the dock and grounded while coming into port.

== Wreck ==
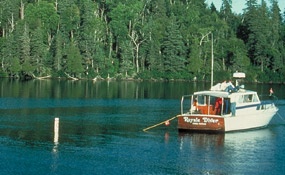
Mooring at America

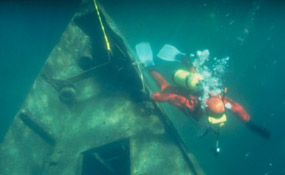
America from above

On June 6, 1928, America steamed out of Duluth on her normal route. She arrived in Isle Royale's Washington Harbor in the early morning hours of June 7 to drop off passengers, and left again before dawn. Once the ship had cleared the dock, the captain turned over the helm to the first mate. Five minutes later, America hit a submerged reef as she was leaving Washington Harbor. Although the captain returned to the helm and attempted to beach her, America ran aground on a second reef. All 16 passengers and 31 crew aboard were successfully transported to lifeboats. Within an hour, America had settled to the bottom in the north gap of Washington Harbor, leaving only her bow, forward deck, and wheelhouse above the waterline.

Efforts were made to re-float the ship, but the bidding process was delayed, and a salvage company was not lined up until 1929. Over the winter of 1928-29, the wheelhouse was sheared off and the ship was shifted by the ice to sit lower in the water. By that time, it was thought that raising the wreck would not be financially feasible, and indeed, the salvage company was never able to raise the capital required to raise the wreck.

A group of divers in the 1960s attempted to raise America and bring her to Duluth for service as a museum ship. This later attempt was also unsuccessful due to Lake Superior storms and, it was rumored, sabotage by a diver who wanted America to stay where she was.

== The wreck today ==
America lies along a steep underwater cliff, with the wreckage sitting as deep as 85 feet to as shallow as only two feet to the surface, and can be easily seen by visitors arriving in Washington Harbor. The ship lies about 190 feet from Isle Royale. The hull is completely intact, as are the belowdeck cabins and the stern. The forward part of the superstructure is missing due to the elements and salvage operations. The effects of winter ice can be seen as far down as 30 feet below the surface, and alterations to the vessel from earlier salvage attempts are apparent.

America is one of the most popular wrecks for diving in Isle Royale National Park, with over 210 dives in 2009 out of 1062 dives made to wrecks in the park. The pressure from the number of dives and the lake motion near the surface has caused the wreck to deteriorate. Nearly all portable objects have been stripped from the wreck by souvenir-hunting divers. Isle Royale National Park has joined in an informal partnership with the Great Lakes Shipwreck Preservation Society (GLSPS) to preserve and monitor America. In 1996, the GLSPS repaired one of the ship's interior walls, and they have reattached other pieces and otherwise worked to stabilize the ship.

One of the Americas lifeboats was on display at the America dock in Snug Harbor in the Rock Harbor Channel on Isle Royal, but was washed into the lake in 2017.

== See also ==
- List of shipwrecks of Isle Royale
