= Passage Island (Michigan) =

Island in Lake Superior, United States

- Location within Michigan

Geography
- Location: Lake Superior; Isle Royale National Park
- Coordinates: 48°14′07″N 88°20′59″W

Administration
- United States
- State: Michigan
- County: Keweenaw County
- Township: Houghton Township

Demographics
- Population: Uninhabited

Passage Island is a small island in the U.S. territory in western Lake Superior. It is the northeasternmost island in Isle Royale National Park, and the northernmost part of Michigan with any human-made structures, although the Gull Island chain is slightly further north.

The island is uninhabited, but has a lighthouse (Passage Island Light) and a short hiking trail. The U.S. National Park Service conducts tours of the island which depart from Rock Harbor on Isle Royale.

== Naming ==
The name "Passage Island" refers to the fact that ships out of and bound for Thunder Bay, Ontario often pass through the gap between Passage Island and Blake Point on the northeastern end of Isle Royale. Although this gap is three and a half miles wide, this passage was often dangerous during late season (early winter) conditions on Lake Superior, especially before the development of modern navigational aids. Great Lakes sailors refer to passing through this gap as "threading the needle."
