= Isle Royale Queen IV =

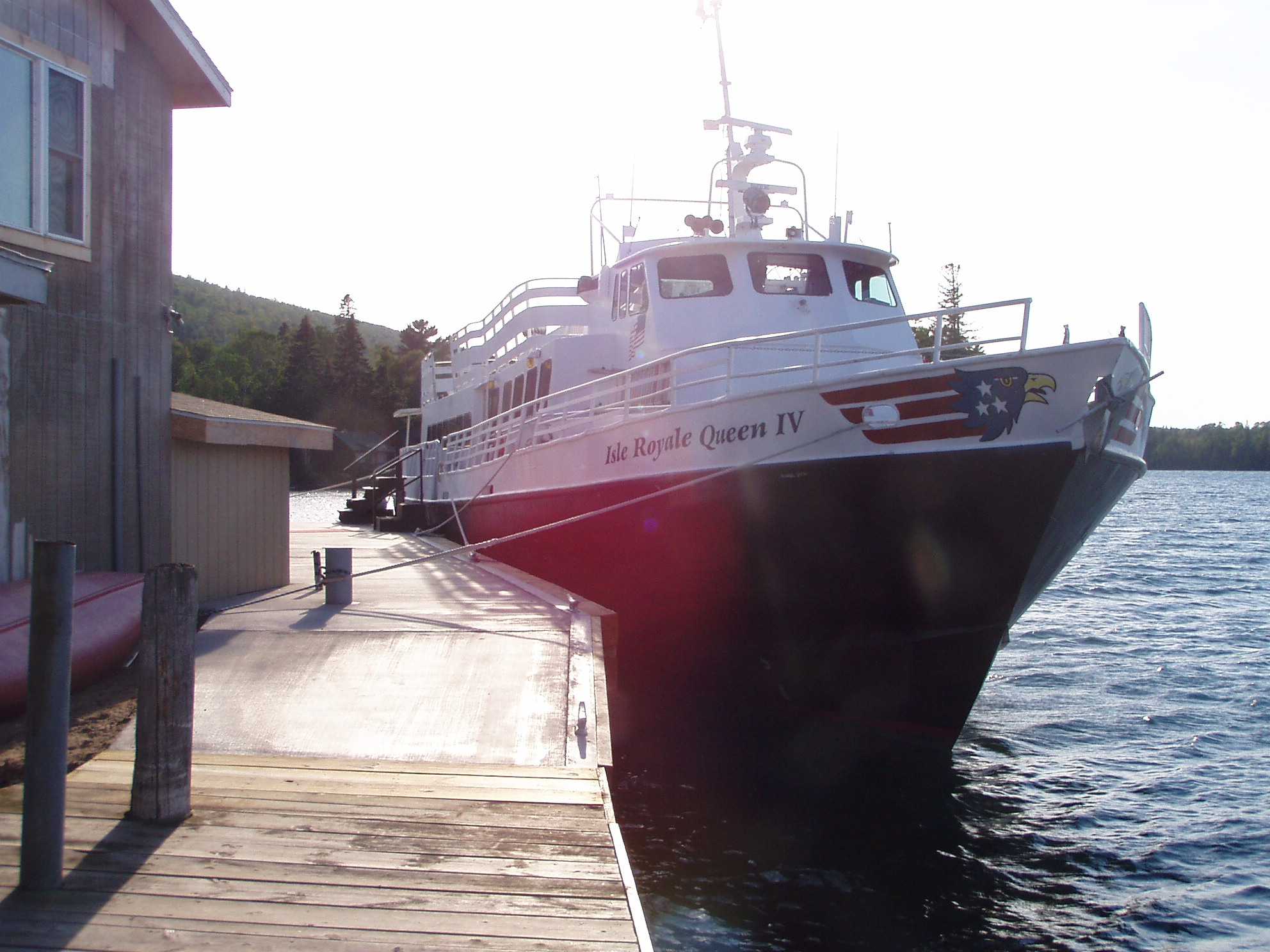
- Isle Royale Queen IV at dock

History

United States
- Name: Isle Royale Queen IV
- Operator: Isle Royale Line, Inc.
- Route: Copper Harbor—Rock Harbor, Michigan
- Launched: 1980
- Acquired: 2004
- In service: 20 June 2005
- Identification: MMSI number: 367046160; Callsign: WDC5770
- Status: in active service, as of 2014

General characteristics
- Type: Passenger ferry
- Length: 100 ft (30 m)
- Beam: 22 ft (6.7 m)
- Propulsion: 3 × V12 Detroit 71 turbo-charged diesel engines

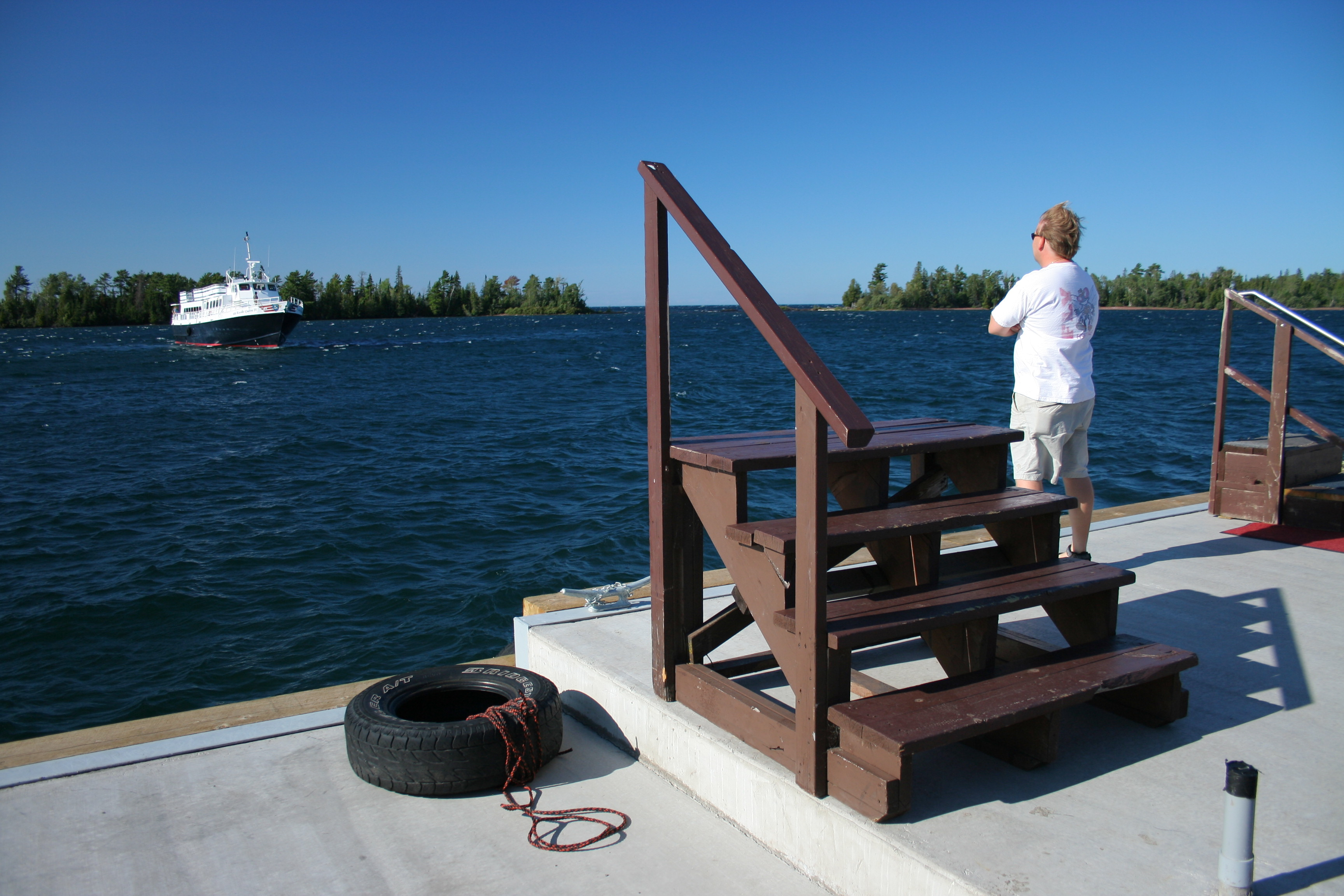
The Isle Royale Queen IV docking at the Waterfront Landing.

Isle Royale Queen IV is a passenger ferry operating on Lake Superior between Copper Harbor, Michigan, and Isle Royale National Park, the largest island on Lake Superior and the State of Michigan's only national park. The ferry operates from mid-May to the end of September each year. In the months of June, July, and August the ferry operates nearly every day. The crossing distance between the port of Copper Harbor and the Smithwick Channel entrance to Rock Harbor at Isle Royale is 53.9 miles (86.7 km). The Queen IV makes this crossing in three hours, fifteen minutes, depending on weather conditions on Lake Superior.

The Queen IV is owned and operated by the Donald E. and Elizabeth A. Kilpela family who now operate the ferry and all the business operations associated with the Isle Royale Line. Inc. (formerly known as the Isle Royale Ferry Service, the private corporation that owns the service. The corporation is a contracted concessionaire of the U.S. National Park Service).

The Queen IV is the third ferry the family has operated on the Lake Superior run since 1971. The ferry began operations on the run in 2005 after being purchased by the family in Port Canaveral, Florida, in 2004. The ferry was built in 1980 in Louisiana, but operated for many years as a tour boat named the John Jay in New York's lower harbor.

In late July 2015, the vessel ran aground, and the Ranger III was called upon to bring the Isle Royale Queen IV's passenger back to the mainland.
