= Submerged Resources Center =

The Submerged Resources Center is a unit within the United States National Park Service. The unit is based out of Lakewood, Colorado in the NPS Intermountain Region headquarters.

== History ==
In 1976, the Submerged Cultural Resources Unit (known as SCRU) was formed and staffed by underwater archeologists, photographers, and service divers to provide the expertise required by managers of national parks with submerged lands. Renamed the Submerged Resources Center in 1999 to include natural resources, the core mission of the program has remained the same: to inventory and evaluate submerged resources in the National Park System and to assist other agencies, nationally and internationally, with underwater resource issues.

== Projects ==
Projects the SRC have been involved in include work on USS Arizona, the shipwrecks of Isle Royale National Park, and mapping the shipwrecks of Dry Tortugas National Park, among others.

Daniel Lenihan, former Chief of the SRC, describes the founding of the unit and many of its exploits in Submerged: Adventures of America's Most Elite Underwater Archeology Team.
