= Isle Royale Line =

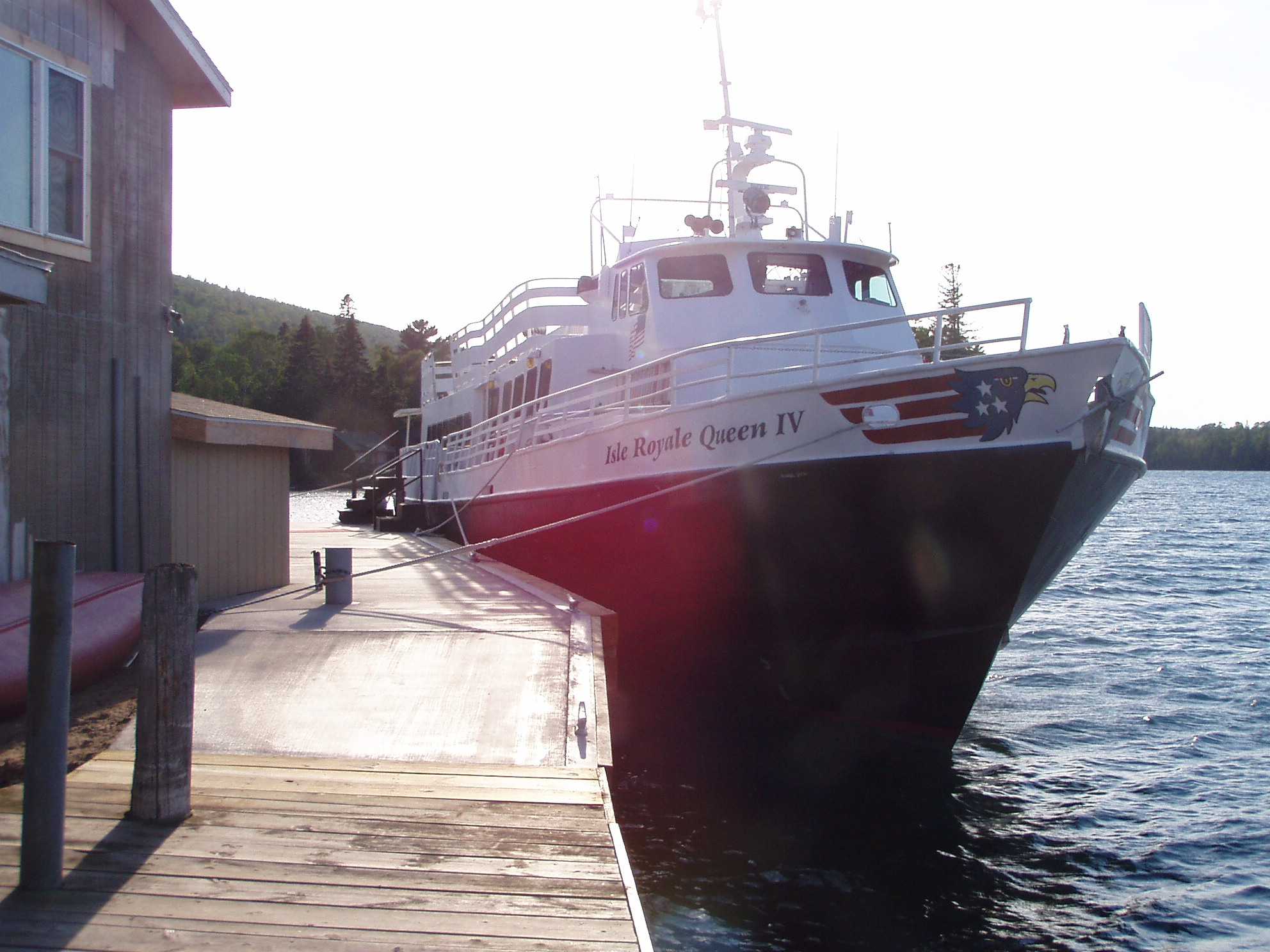
Isle Royale Queen IV, the current ferry

The Isle Royale Line – previously Isle Royale Ferry Service – is a transportation service between Copper Harbor, Michigan and Isle Royale National Park. It is the successor of a series of ferry services between the Keewenaw Peninsula and Isle Royale, operating six vessels since 1930 under different owners: Water Lily, Copper Queen, and four named Isle Royale Queen.

== History ==
=== Water Lily: 1930-1935 ===
Ferry service to the island began around ten years before it became a national park, with the Water Lily, owned by Charles Kauppi. Kauppi originally hailed from Gay, Michigan, but, in the summer of 1930, brought his small fishing vessel the Water Lily up from Gay forty miles into the harbor. The former commercial fisherman began to run charters from the harbor to the island for campers, hikers, fishermen, and resort-goers. This move was extremely risky, as the harbor was forty miles from the closest town, and the road connecting the two was not paved at the time. Also, he began his new enterprise at the beginning of the Great Depression, and Keweenaw County would soon experience an unemployment rate of over 60%.

But Kauppi seemed not to be a normal man. He was a risk-taker, very brave (several seamen have said that Kauppi is the bravest captain ever to have sailed on Lake Superior, going out to rescue ailing vessels in unspeakable conditions—sometimes at the request of the Coast Guard station in Eagle Harbor). He was determined to have his ferry service.

But the Water Lily wasn't really a suitable ferry boat. It was a converted fishing vessel, 35 feet in length, with several portholes and a wooden hull. And the trips to the island were immensely long, usually taking over six hours. Many times Kauppi would recruit a passenger (usually a woman) to take the helm when he brewed coffee on the long voyage over. In about 1935, Kauppi realized that he needed something better, now that the publicity surrounding president Herbert Hoover's authorization of Isle Royale as a national park had increased business.

=== Copper Queen and Isle Royale Queen: 1936-1955 ===
Over the five years Kauppi had operated the Water Lily, he realized that it had turned cramped and out-of-fashion. He decided to build a vessel suitable for passengers, and soon contacted a local shipbuilder to build his 48-foot (15 m) Copper Queen. With its yacht-like shape, handsome build, and carrying capacity of 48, Kauppi knew he could attract more customers with it. Kauppi sold his Water Lily, and continued on with his charter with the Queen.

However, when the Coast Guard began to impose tighter ferry boat construction standards, the Copper Queen could have been put out of service. The vessel did not possess watertight compartments that lay below that waterline, and the Coast Guard did not certify the ship to carry people on a regular schedule. Unfazed, Kauppi simply continued running his charter service to the island, as he had done with his previous boat.

The Copper Queen did about the same time as the Water Lily: six-and-a-half hours. It would remain at the island overnight at Rock Harbor and return the next morning. As well as stopping at Rock Harbor, the Queen would also make stops at Tobin Harbor and Belle Isle, where there were also lodges and campgrounds. Kauppi would occasionally sail to Thunder Bay, then known as Port Arthur/Fort William. It cost five dollars to traverse the lake to the island.

But Kauppi was determined to run something other than a charter. He wanted to expand towards a scheduled and published ferry service. This goal was reached in 1938 when he commissioned the Wiinikka Boat Works of Houghton to build the Isle Royale Queen, a forty-foot ship that contained the necessary watertight compartments the Coast Guard wanted. Kauppi could now operate his business on a schedule, but he did not rid himself of the Copper Queen

When Isle Royale became a national park in 1940, Kauppi began to operate both boats, with the help of his son Willard (known as "Sully"), to the island. But when Charles died in 1955, his family sold the Copper Queen to the Grand Portage-Isle Royale Transportation Service, where it was renamed the Voyageur.

=== Ward Grosnik: 1955-1971 ===
The family's second move was to sell the Isle Royale Queen and its business to one Ward Grosnik of Copper Harbor. Grosnik quickly expanded on the current operation, and set up a contract with the T. D. Vinette Boat Company of Escanaba, Michigan to build the Isle Royale Queen II, a 57-foot-long (17 m), 18-foot-wide (5.5 m) steel ship, much faster than her descendants. This new ship was put into service in 1960, and he soon sold the Isle Royale Queen to a Houghton resident.

The Queen II could make it to Isle Royale in about four hours, which nearly cut travel time in half. She possessed three Gray Marine engines (later replaced with twin diesel engines), could carry 57 people, and could carry 1 1/2 tons of extra gear. Captain F. Manzzutti, a marine surveyor who surveyed the Queen, described the new vessel as such:

a specially designed, staunch, graceful, open-water long-voyage, heavy weather ferry ... with a gracefully raked stem, streamline, contour, elliptical after-splay; tumble-home transom; rounded forefoot; slightly flared, raised bow; straight sides; v-bow merging into semi-modest v-bottom to midship, thence to a near-flat bottom to the reinforced transom area.

Ward, along with his sons, ran this new boat from 1955 to 1971, when Ward retired. He then sold his enterprise to Donald Kilpela Sr., then residing in Livonia, Michigan, outside of Detroit. Kilpela soon moved to Copper Harbor to resume his new ferry service.

=== The Queen II, III, and IV: 1971-Present ===
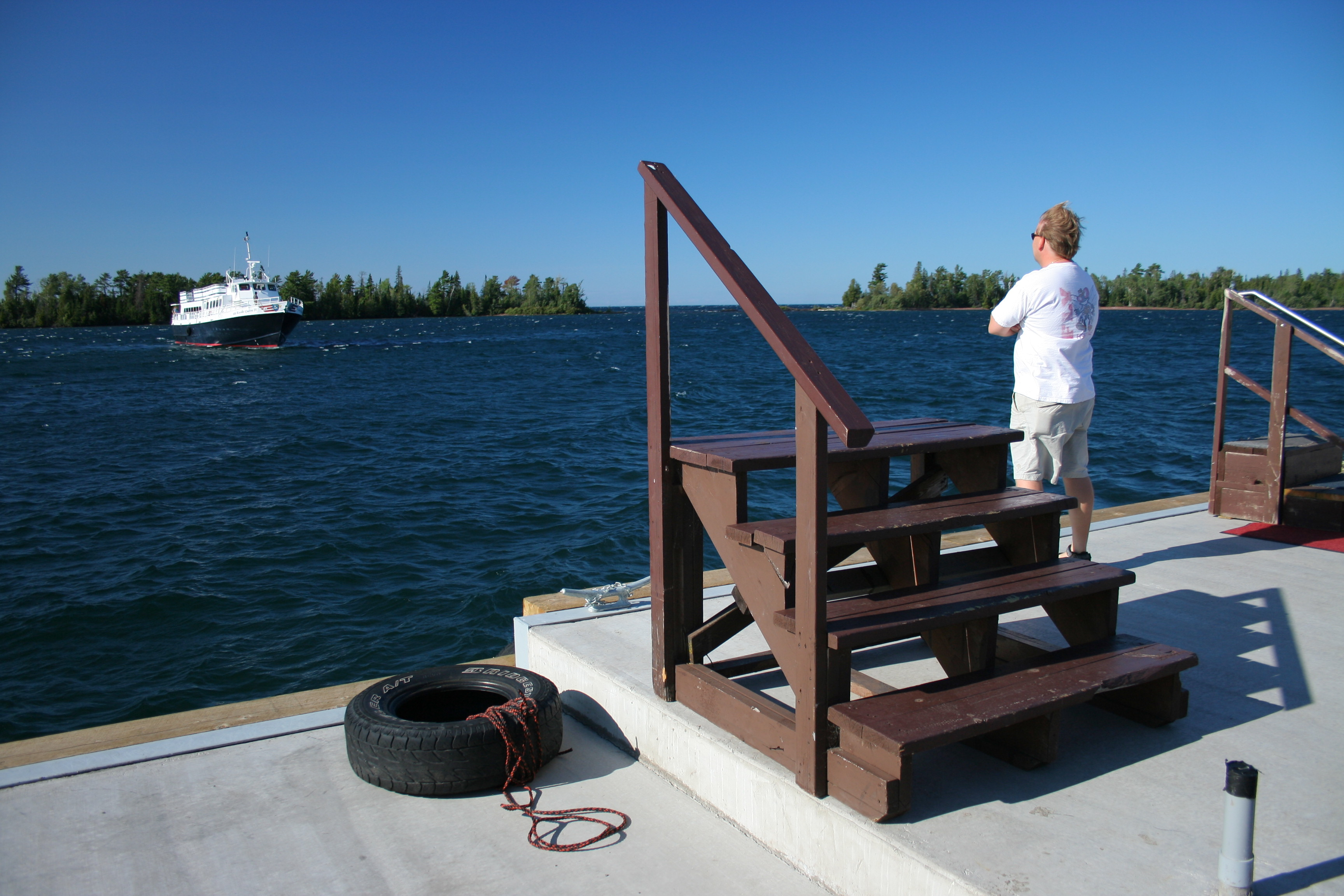
The Isle Royale Queen IV docking at the Waterfront Landing.

Kilpela ran regular trips to Isle Royale in the Queen II from 1971-1988. As the Island itself began to undergo changes (1976: the land was designated a National Wilderness Preservation System; 98% of the Island must remain wilderness—1981: the land is designated as an International Biosphere Reserve), Kilpela's business began to increase. He soon added two gift shops to his growing enterprise: Elizabeth's (named and run by his wife) and Ragamuffins (also run by his wife and his daughters), and he was looking to find a replacement for his current ferry. Despite his efforts, Kilpela could not find a new vessel worthy of the crossing, so he hired naval architect Timothy Graul to design a lengthening of his current ship. The Vinette Boat Company, which had built the original vessel, added 24 feet and a stern cabin to the Queen II. She was now 81 feet long, could carry 100 passengers, and could traverse the lake in about 3.5 hours.

In 1989, this new ship was renamed the Isle Royale Queen III. As well as having a new name, length, and carry capacity, the new Queen could handle rough seas much more easily with her longer hull. The names that had been bestowed on the earlier ship, such as the "Barf Barge", "Chuck Wagon", etc. were transferred over (the new ship still couldn't handle high seas very well), but were used much more sparingly. The Queen III lasted until 2004, when Kilpela decided to replace, yet again, his older vessel.

After nearly two years of searching, Kilpela found his new ship: the American Freedom, which was then docked in Cape Canaveral. Kilpela and his three sons sailed the ship up three rivers, into Lake Michigan, and finally, to Copper Harbor, where it was renamed the Isle Royale Queen IV. At 100 feet long, 20 feet wide, with spacious cabin space, she could make the crossing in just over three hours. Donald Kilpela Sr. retired from captaining duties several years before he purchased the Queen IV, and the duty passed to his three sons, Donald Jr., Ben, and John Kilpela.

== See also ==
- Ferries in Michigan
