= Isle Royale National Park =

National park on Isle Royale, Michigan, US

- IUCN category Ib (wilderness area)
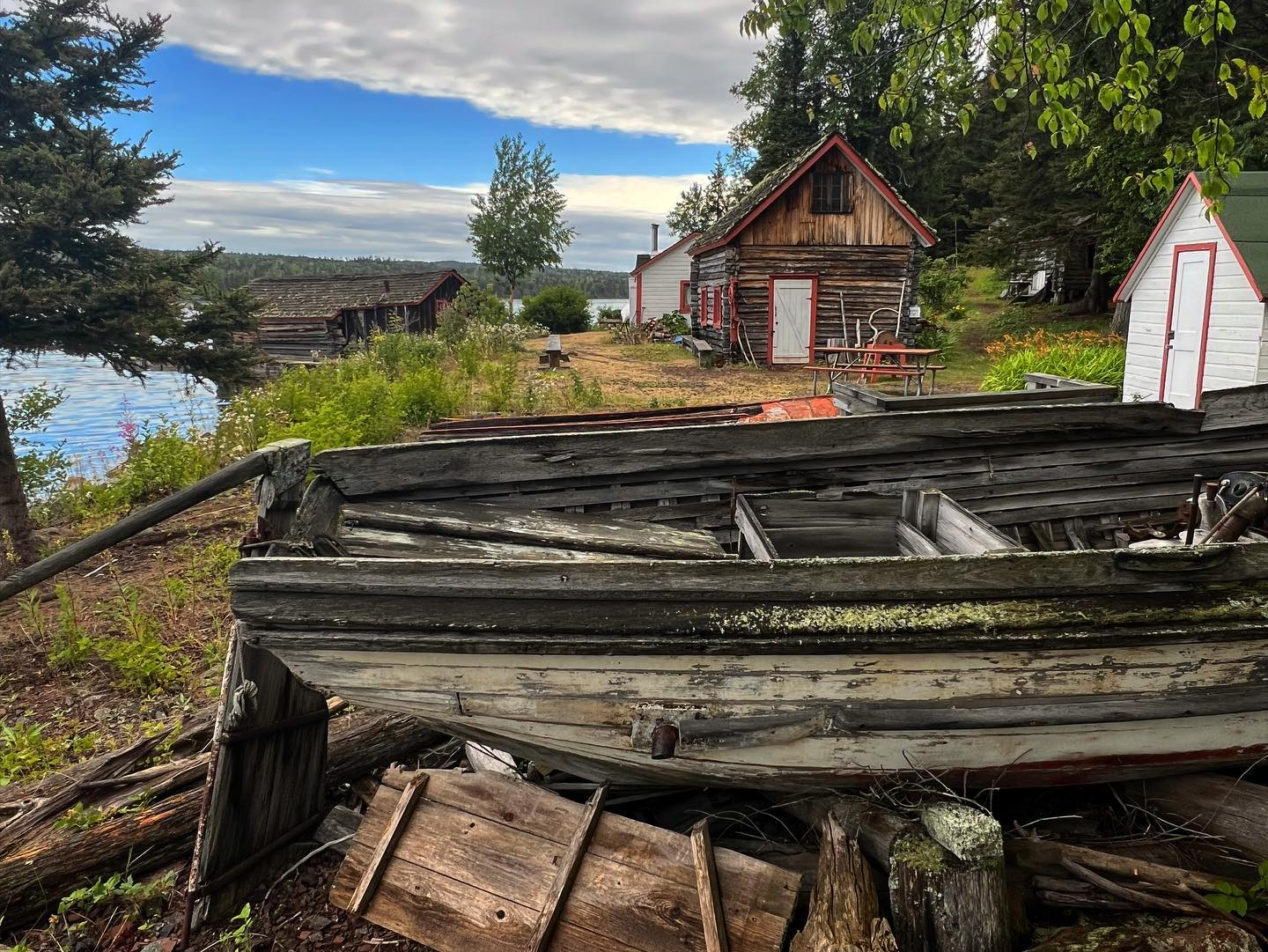
- Site of the historic Edisen Fishery

- Location within Michigan Location within the United States
- Interactive map of Isle Royale National Park
- Location: Keweenaw County, Michigan, United States
- Nearest city: Thunder Bay, Ontario
- Coordinates: 48.01°N 88.85°W
- Area: 571,790 acres (2,314.0 km^{2})
- Established: April 3, 1940; 86 years ago
- Visitors: 28,965 (in 2023)
- Governing body: National Park Service
- Website: nps.gov/isro

- Minong
- U.S. National Register of Historic Places
- U.S. Historic district
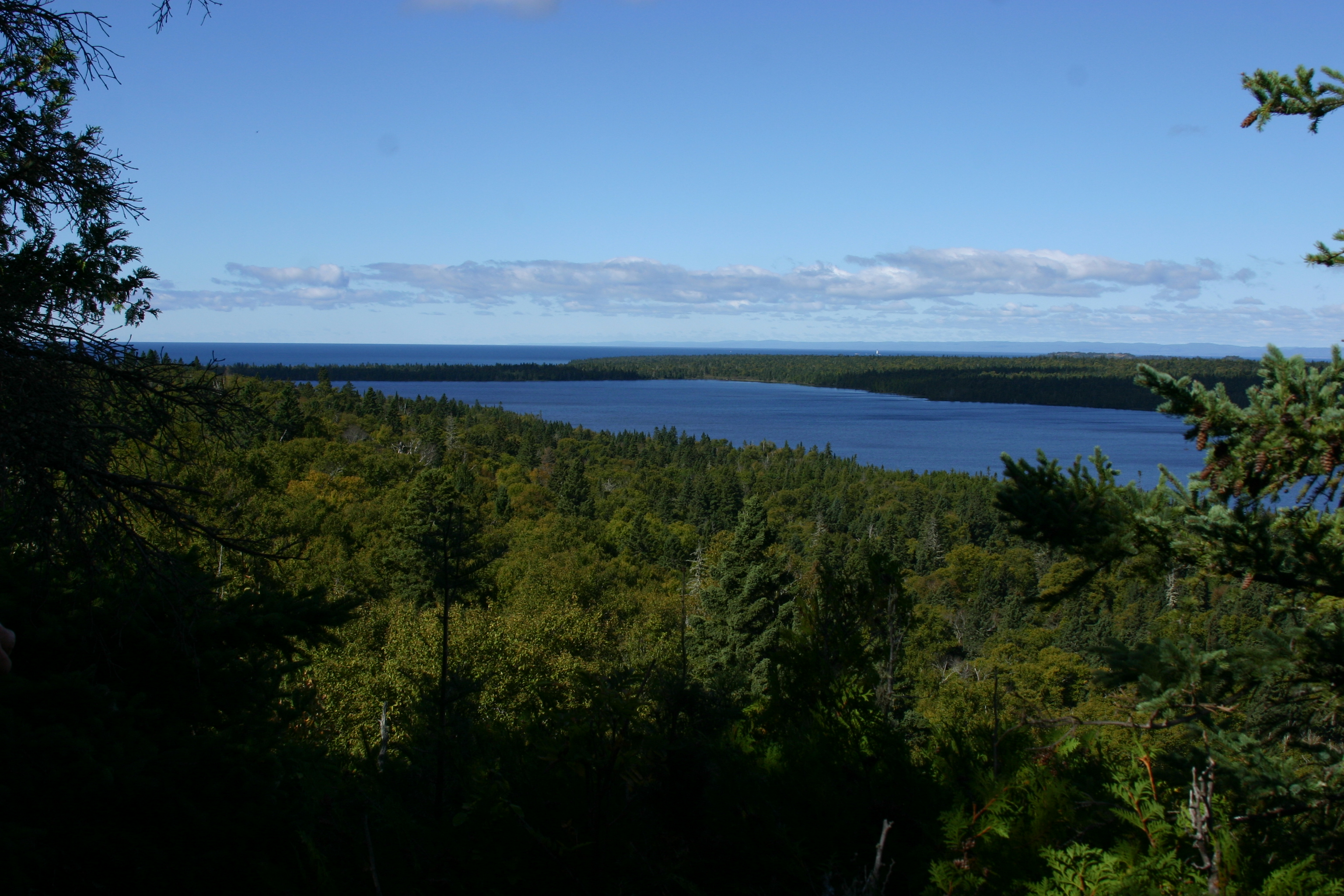
- Siskiwit Bay
- Area: 189,665 acres (76,755 ha) [133,788 acres (54,142 ha) land and 55,877 acres (22,613 ha) water]
- NRHP reference No.: 100003341
- Added to NRHP: January 24, 2019

Isle Royale National Park is a national park of the United States consisting of Isle Royale, along with more than 400 small adjacent islands and the surrounding waters of Lake Superior, in Michigan.

Isle Royale is 45 mi (72 km) long and 9 mi (14 km) wide, with an area of 206.73 sq mi (535.4 km^{2}), making it the fifth-largest lake island in the world. In addition, it is the largest natural island in Lake Superior, the second-largest island in the Great Lakes (after Manitoulin Island), the third-largest in the contiguous United States (after Long Island and Padre Island), and the 33rd-largest island in the United States.

Isle Royale National Park was established on April 3, 1940. It later received additional protections from development by a wilderness area designation in 1976, a UNESCO International Biosphere Reserve declaration in 1980, and was added to the National Register of Historic Places in 2019 as the Minong Traditional Cultural Property. The park covers 894 sq mi (2,320 km^{2}), with 209 sq mi (540 km^{2}) of land and 685 sq mi (1,770 km^{2}) of surrounding waters.

The park's northern boundary lies adjacent to the Canadian Lake Superior National Marine Conservation Area along the international border. With 25,894 visits in 2021, it is the seventh least-visited National Park in the United States.

== Geography ==
In 1875, Isle Royale was split off from Keweenaw County, as a separate county, Isle Royale County. In 1897, the county was dissolved, and the island was reincorporated into Keweenaw County. The highest point on the island is Mount Desor at 1,394 ft (425 m), or about 800 ft (240 m) above lake level.

Isle Royale, the largest island in Lake Superior, is over 45 mi (72 km) in length and 9 mi (14 km) wide at its widest point. The park is made up of Isle Royale itself and approximately 400 smaller islands, along with any submerged lands within 4.5 mi (7.2 km) of the surrounding islands (16USC408g).

Isle Royale is within about 15 mi (24 km) of the shore of the Canadian province of Ontario (near the city of Thunder Bay) and adjacently, the state of Minnesota (near Grand Portage in Cook County), and is 56 mi (90 km) from the Michigan shore, on the Keweenaw Peninsula, itself part of Upper Peninsula. There are no roads on the island, and wheeled vehicles or devices, other than wheelchairs, are not permitted. Rock Harbor has wheeled carts available to move personal belongings from the Rock Harbor marina to the cabins and hotel. Also, the National Park Service employs tractors and utility terrain vehicles to move items around the developed areas at Ozaagaateng, Rock Harbor, and Mott Island.

Topsoil tends to be thin, which favors trees that have horizontal root patterns such as balsam fir, white spruce, and black spruce.

=== Interior lakes ===
Siskiwit Lake is the largest lake on the island. It has cold, clear water which is relatively low in nutrients. Siskiwit Lake contains several islands, including Ryan Island, the largest. Other lakes include:

- Chicken Bone Lake
- Lake Desor
- Feldtmann Lake
- Intermediate Lake (Isle Royale)
- Lake Ritchie
- Sargent Lake
- Hatchet Lake

== Climate ==
According to the Köppen climate classification system, Isle Royale National Park has a mild summer Humid continental climate (Dfb). According to the United States Department of Agriculture, the Plant Hardiness zone is 4b at 1178 ft (359 m) elevation with an average annual extreme minimum temperature of -24.2 °F (-31.2 °C).

There is no weather station in the park, but the PRISM Climate Group, a project of Oregon State University, provides interpolated data for the island based on the climates of nearby areas.

Climate data for Isle Royale National Park. Elev: 1184 ft (361 m)
Month	Jan	Feb	Mar	Apr	May	Jun	Jul	Aug	Sep	Oct	Nov	Dec	Year
Mean daily maximum °F (°C)	17.6 (−8.0)	24.0 (−4.4)	35.2 (1.8)	45.9 (7.7)	57.9 (14.4)	66.1 (18.9)	72.1 (22.3)	71.8 (22.1)	63.0 (17.2)	49.2 (9.6)	34.9 (1.6)	22.5 (−5.3)	46.8 (8.2)
Daily mean °F (°C)	8.4 (−13.1)	13.6 (−10.2)	24.2 (−4.3)	35.9 (2.2)	46.8 (8.2)	56.0 (13.3)	61.7 (16.5)	61.2 (16.2)	53.4 (11.9)	41.1 (5.1)	28.1 (−2.2)	14.9 (−9.5)	37.2 (2.9)
Mean daily minimum °F (°C)	−0.8 (−18.2)	3.3 (−15.9)	13.2 (−10.4)	25.8 (−3.4)	35.7 (2.1)	46.0 (7.8)	51.4 (10.8)	50.6 (10.3)	43.7 (6.5)	33.0 (0.6)	21.2 (−6.0)	7.3 (−13.7)	27.6 (−2.4)
Average precipitation inches (mm)	1.97 (50)	1.18 (30)	1.62 (41)	2.14 (54)	2.80 (71)	3.15 (80)	3.26 (83)	3.02 (77)	3.17 (81)	3.22 (82)	2.39 (61)	2.03 (52)	29.95 (761)
Average relative humidity (%)	78.9	73.2	66.6	59.1	60.9	68.5	69.7	73.9	76.5	75.4	76.6	81.6	71.7
Average dew point °F (°C)	3.2 (−16.0)	6.6 (−14.1)	14.7 (−9.6)	23.0 (−5.0)	34.0 (1.1)	45.8 (7.7)	51.7 (10.9)	52.8 (11.6)	46.2 (7.9)	33.9 (1.1)	21.7 (−5.7)	10.3 (−12.1)	28.8 (−1.8)
Source: PRISM Climate Group

== History ==
=== Prehistory ===
The island was a common hunting ground for native people from nearby Minnesota and Ontario. A canoe voyage of thirteen miles is necessary to reach the island's west end from the mainland.

Large quantities of copper artifacts found in indian mounds and settlements, some dating back to 3000 B.C., were most likely mined on Isle Royale and the nearby Keweenaw Peninsula. The island has hundreds of pits and trenches up to 65 feet (20 m) deep from these indigenous peoples, with most in the McCargoe Cove area. Carbon-14 testing of wood remains found in sockets of copper artifacts indicates that they are at least 6500 years old.

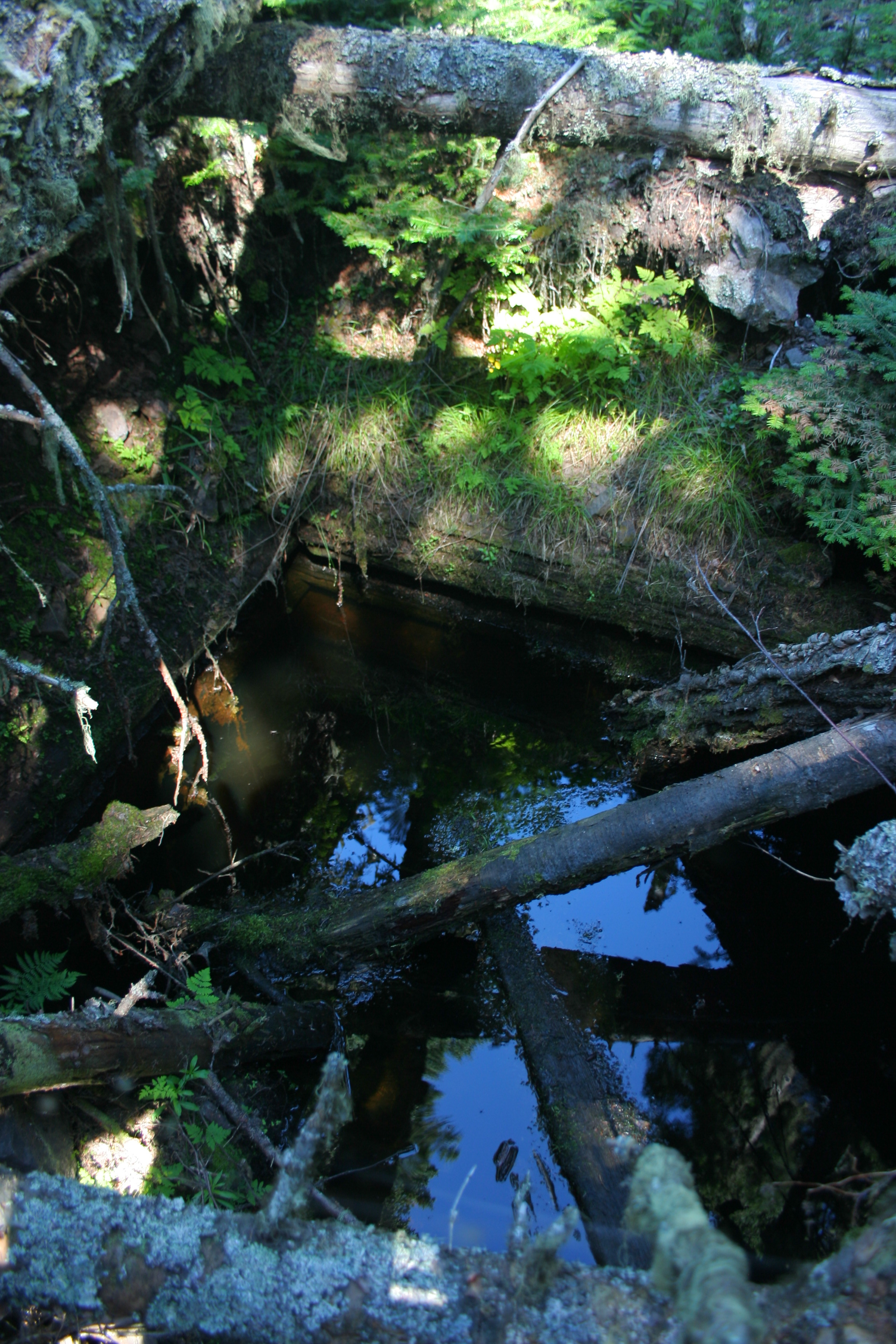
An abandoned copper mine shaft

In Prehistoric Copper Mining in the Lake Superior Region, Drier and Du Temple estimated that over 750,000 tons of copper had been mined from the region. However, David Johnson and Susan Martin contend that their estimate was based on exaggerated and inaccurate assumptions. The Jesuit missionary Dablon published an account in 1669–70 of "an island called Menong, celebrated for its copper". Menong, or Minong, was the native term for the island, and is the basis for Minong Ridge. Prospecting began in earnest when the Chippewas relinquished their claims to the island in 1843, starting with many of the original native pits. This activity had ended by 1855, when no economic deposits were found. The Minong Mine and Island Mine were the result of renewed but short-lived activity from 1873 to 1881.

Isle Royale was given to the United States by the 1783 treaty with Great Britain (formerly part of the Indian Reserve disputed by the United States) but the British remained in control until after the War of 1812, and the Ojibwa peoples considered the island to be their territory. The Ojibwas ceded the island to the U.S. in the 1842 Treaty of La Pointe, with the Grand Portage Band unaware that neither they nor Isle Royale were in British territory. With the clarification to the Ojibwas of the 1842 Webster–Ashburton Treaty that was signed before the Treaty of La Pointe, the Ojibwas re-affirmed the 1842 Treaty of La Pointe in the 1844 Isle Royale Agreement, with the Grand Portage Band signing the agreement as an addendum to the 1842 treaty.

In the mid-1840s, a report by Douglass Houghton, Michigan's first state geologist, set off a copper boom in the state, and the first modern copper mines were opened on the island. Evidence of the earlier mining efforts was everywhere, in the form of many stone hammers, some copper artifacts, and places where copper had been partially worked out of the rock but left in place. The ancient pits and trenches led to the discovery of many of the copper deposits that were mined in the 19th century. The remoteness of the island, combined with the small veins of copper, caused most of the 19th-century mines to fail quickly. Between the miners and commercial loggers, much of the island was deforested during the late 19th century. Once the island became a national park in 1940, logging and other exploitive activities ended, and the forest began to regenerate.

The island was once the site of several lake trout and whitefish fisheries, as well as a few resorts. The fishing industry has declined considerably, but continues at Edisen Fishery. Today, it has no permanent inhabitants; the small communities of Scandinavian fishermen were removed by the United States National Park Service after the island became a national park in the 1940s. About 12 families still have lifetime leases for their cabins and claim Isle Royale as their heritage, and several descendant fishermen fish the Isle Royale waters commercially.

Because numerous small islands surround Isle Royale, ships were once guided through the area by lighthouses at Passage Island, Rock Harbor, Rock of Ages, and Isle Royale Lighthouse on Menagerie Island. The western tip of the island is home to several shipwrecks that are very popular with scuba divers, including the SS America. The NPS Submerged Resources Center mapped the 10 most famous of the shipwrecks contained within the park, and published Shipwrecks of Isle Royale National Park; The Archeological Survey, which gives an overview of the maritime history of the area. The area's notoriously harsh weather, dramatic underwater topography, the island's central location on historic shipping routes, and the cold, fresh water have resulted in largely intact, well preserved wrecks throughout the park.

In January 2019, the entire island chain was added to the National Register of Historic Places by the federal government. On the Register it is called 'the Minong Traditional Cultural Property.'

=== Angelique Mott ===
In 1845, an Ojibwe woman named Angelique and her voyageur husband Charles Mott were left on Isle Royale, as hires for Cyrus Mendenhall and the Lake Superior Copper Company. They were hired and carried to Isle Royale by Mendenhall's schooner, the Algonquin, first to scout for copper. Angelique found a large mass of copper ore. She and her husband were hired to stay and guard it until a barge could come to retrieve it, promised in no more than 3 months' time. They were dropped off in July and were left stranded there until the following spring. They were left with minimal provisions, which consisted of a half-barrel of flour, six pounds of butter, and some beans. A supply boat was promised to arrive after the first few weeks, but it was never sent out.

The full events were chronicled in a footnote as told by Angelique, in the first printing of a book called "The Honorable Peter White" by Ralph D. Williams in 1907; Angelique's story was pulled from the subsequent printing, thus making it the only written record that survives. Humans have not normally settled year-round on Isle Royale. For about three thousand years, Native Americans used the land for copper and fish. These Native Americans usually limited their visits to the island in the summer. Americans in the nineteenth century did likewise.

== Natural history ==
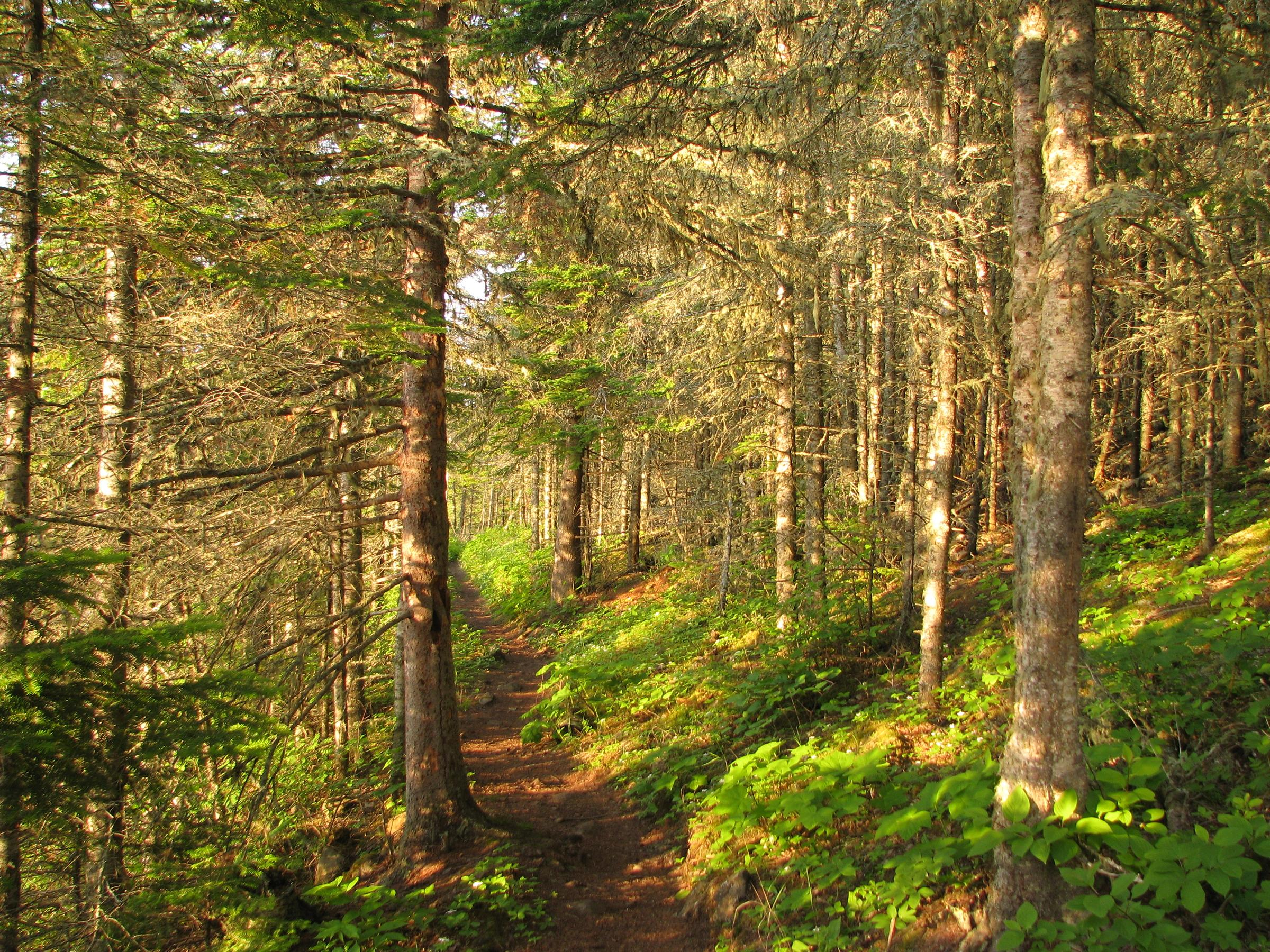
Tobin Harbor Trail in the Laurentian Mixed Forest Province

A number of habitats exist on the island, the primary being boreal forest, similar to neighboring Ontario and Minnesota. Upland areas along some of the ridges are effectively "balds" with exposed bedrock and a few scrubby trees, blueberry bushes, and hardy grasses. Occasional marshes exist, which are typically the by-product of beaver activities. There are also several lakes, often with wooded or marshy shores. The climate, especially in lowland areas, is heavily influenced by the cold waters of Lake Superior.

=== Flora ===
According to the A. W. Kuchler U.S. Potential natural vegetation Types, Isle Royale National Park has a Great Lakes Spruce/Fir (93) potential vegetation type and a Northern Conifer Forest (22) potential vegetation form.

The predominant floral habitats of Isle Royale are within the Laurentian Mixed Forest Province. The area is a temperate broadleaf and mixed forests biome transition zone between the true boreal forest to the north and Big Woods to the south, with characteristics of each. It has areas of both broadleaf and conifer forest cover, and bodies of water ranging from conifer bogs to swamps.

Conifers include jack pines (Pinus banksiana), black and white spruces (Picea mariana and Picea glauca), balsam firs (Abies balsamea), and eastern redcedars (Juniperus virginiana).

Deciduous trees include quaking aspens (Populus tremuloides), red oaks (Quercus rubra), paper birches (Betula papyrifera), American mountain ash (Sorbus americana), red maples (Acer rubrum), sugar maples (Acer saccharum), and mountain maples (Acer spicatum). There are over 600 species of flowering plants found in Isle Royale National Park such as wild sarsaparilla, marsh-marigold, wood lily and prickly wild rose.

=== Fauna ===
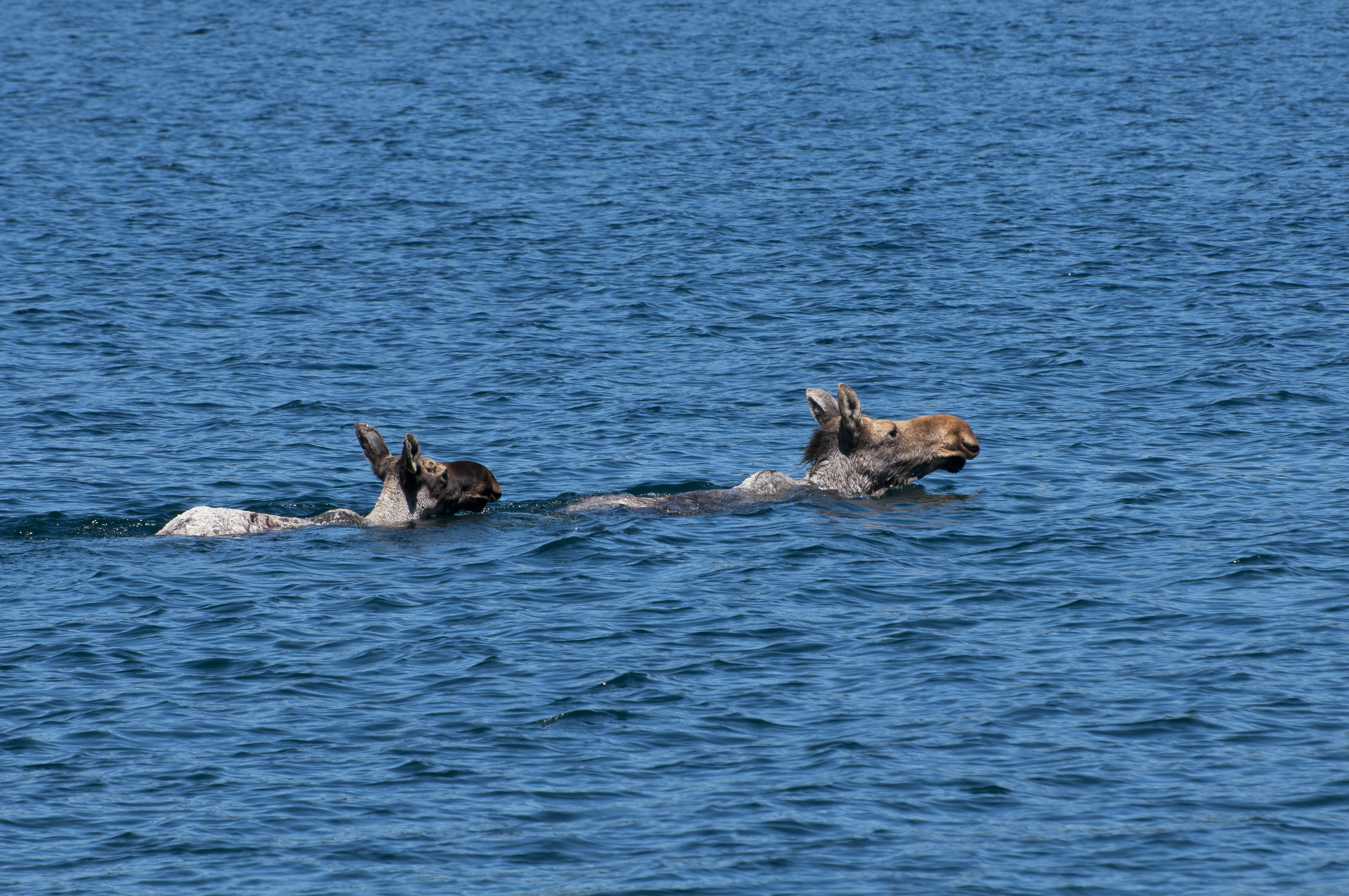
Moose swimming at Isle Royale.

Isle Royale National Park is known for its wolf and moose populations, which are studied by scientists investigating predator-prey relationships in a closed environment. There is a cyclical relationship between the two animals: as the moose increase in population, so do the wolves. Eventually, the wolves kill too many moose and begin to starve and lower their reproductive rates. This is made easier because Isle Royale has been colonized by roughly just one third of the mainland mammal species, because it is so remote. In addition, the environment is unique in that it is the only known place where wolves and moose coexist without the presence of bears.

Other common mammals are red foxes, beavers, and red squirrels. Some foxes are accustomed to human contact and can be seen prowling the campgrounds at dawn, looking for stray scraps left by unwary campers. For its part, the wolf is an elusive species which avoids human interaction. Few documented cases of direct wolf/human contact existed for most of the island's history. In the 2024 season dozens of wolf sightings were reported around the Rock Harbor area. Ermine have been periodically sighted around docks. Other mammals that can be seen include mink along the various lake shores and muskrats (occasionally) at beaver ponds. Several species of bat also exist on the island. Reptiles include the eastern garter snake, painted turtle, and northern redbelly snake. Six species of frogs and three species of salamander also live on the island.

Historically neither moose nor wolves inhabited Isle Royale. Just prior to becoming a national park the large mammals on Isle Royale were Canada lynx and the boreal woodland caribou. Archeological evidence indicates both of these species were present on Isle Royale for 3,500 years prior to being removed by direct human actions (hunting, trapping, mining, logging, fires, competition for resources from exotic species and possibly disease due to the introduction of invasive species). The last caribou documented on Isle Royale was in 1925. Though lynx were removed by the 1930s, some have periodically crossed the ice bridge from neighboring Ontario, Canada, the most recent being an individual sighting in 1980. Although lynx are no longer present on the island, their primary prey, snowshoe hares, remain. Before the appearance of wolves, coyotes were also predators on the island. Coyotes appeared around 1905 and disappeared shortly after wolves arrived in the 1950s. Four wolves were brought from Minnesota in 2018 after some debate as to whether or not the introduction was an unnatural intervention.

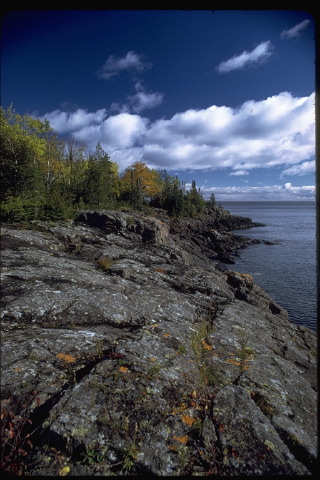
Rocky shoreline

Moose are believed to have colonized Isle Royale sometime between 1905 and 1912. It was initially believed that a small herd of moose (moose typically do not travel in herds) colonized the islands by crossing the ice from the adjacent mainland; later this theory was modified to a herd of moose swimming 20 miles across Lake Superior from the nearest mainland. The improbability of these theories received little scrutiny until recent years. Although no thorough scientific investigation to determine how moose arrived on Isle Royale has been carried out to date, both cultural and genetic evidence indicates they were likely introduced by humans to create a private hunting preserve in the early 1900s. The cultural evidence that moose were trapped in northwestern Minnesota and transported to Isle Royale seemed unlikely until decades later when genetic evidence revealed the moose on Isle Royale were more closely related to moose in the far northwestern Minnesota/Manitoba border area than the mainland adjacent to Isle Royale in far northeastern Minnesota bordering Ontario. Further evidence has also shown that the Washington Harbor Club, a group of well-to-do businessmen, owned various buildings on Isle Royale in addition to railroads that ran from Baudette to Duluth and Two Harbors and so had the means to transport moose from northwestern Minnesota to Two Harbors.

There are usually around 25 wolves and 1000 moose on the island, but the numbers change greatly year to year. In the 2006–2007 winter, a survey found 385 moose and 21 wolves in 3 packs. In spring 2008, 23 wolves and approximately 650 moose were counted. However, recent reductions in winter pack ice had ended replenishment of the wolf population from the mainland. Due to genetic inbreeding, the wolf population had declined to two individuals in 2016, causing researchers to expect that the island's wolf population would eventually become extinct. At the same time, the island's moose population had exploded to an estimated 1600. By November 2017, the wolf population was down to one, a female.

In December 2016, the National Park Service put forward an initial plan to bring additional wolves to the island in order to prevent the pack from disappearing completely. The decision to relocate 20–30 wolves to the island was approved and from September 2018 to September 2019, 19 wolves were relocated to Isle Royale from various locations in Minnesota, Michigan, and Ontario. As of April 14, 2020, there were an estimated 14 wolves remaining on the island.

=== Geology ===
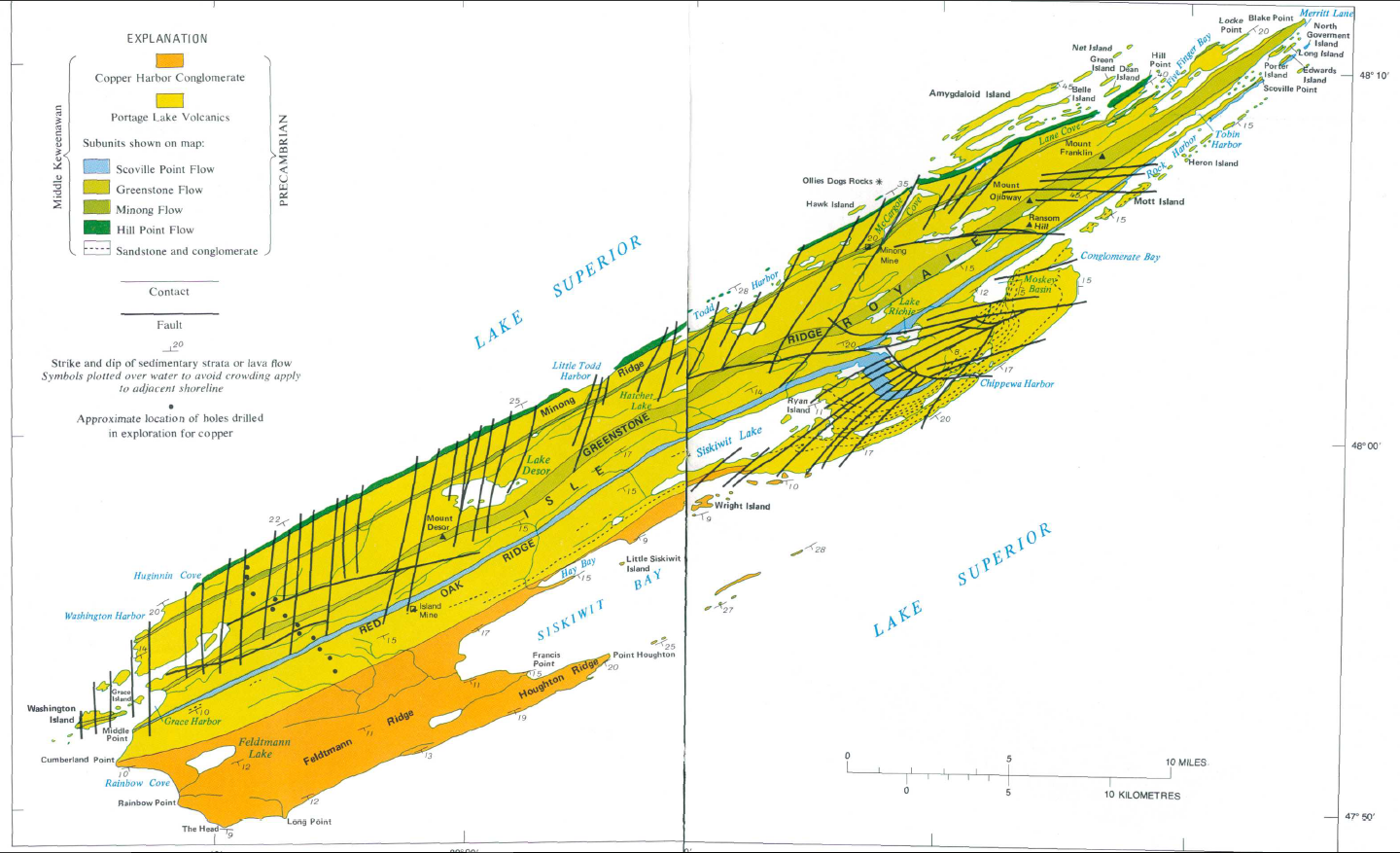
Isle Royale geological map

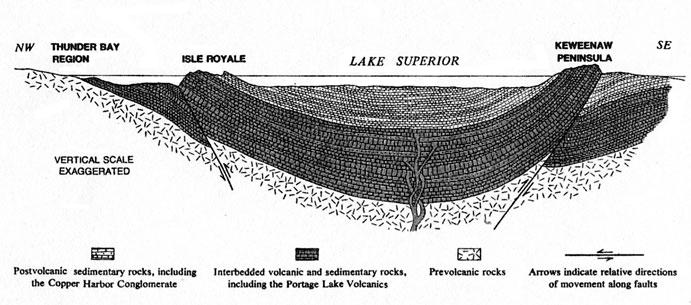
Cross-section of the Lake Superior basin showing the tilted strata of volcanic rock that form Isle Royale

The island is composed largely of ridges, running roughly southwest-to-northeast. The main ridge, Greenstone Ridge, is over 1,000 ft (300 m) in many places. Greenstone belts are exposed, with rounded stones of chlorastrolite, also known as greenstone, near and in the lake.

The two main rock assemblages found on the island include the Portage Lake Volcanics and the Copper Harbor Conglomerate, both Precambrian in age. The volcanics are mainly ophitic flood basalts, some 100 individual flows over an accumulated thickness of at least 10,000 feet. The conglomerate outcrops on the southwestern portion of the island and consists of sedimentary rock derived from volcanic rocks in present-day Minnesota. Glacial erosion accentuated the ridge and valley topography from pre-glacial stream erosion. Glacial striations indicate a generally westward movement of the glaciers as do the recessional moraines west of Lake Desor. Drumlins are found west of Siskiwit Lake.

Recent analyses by the USGS of both unmineralized basalt and copper-mineralized rock show that a small amount of naturally occurring mercury is associated with mineralization.

Native copper and chlorastrolite, the official state gem of Michigan, are secondary minerals filling pore spaces formed by vesicles and fractures within the volcanic rocks. Prehnite and agate amygdules are also plentiful island gemstones.

== Recreation ==
Recreational activity on Isle Royale includes hiking, backpacking, fishing, boating, canoeing, kayaking, and observing nature. Wheeled vehicles are not permitted on Isle Royale; though wheelchairs are allowed.

=== Hiking ===
The island offers approximately 170 mi (270 km) of hiking trails for everything from day hikes to a two-week circumnavigation hike. Some of the hiking trails are quite challenging, with steep grades. The Greenstone Ridge is a high ridge in the center of the island and carries the longest trail in the park, the Greenstone Ridge Trail, which runs 40 mi (64 km) from one end of the island to the other. This is generally done as a 4 or 5 day hike. A boat shuttle can carry hikers back to their starting point. The trail leads to the peak of Mount Desor, at 1,394 ft (425 m), the highest point on the island, and passes through northwoods wilderness, and by inland glacial lakes, swamps, bogs and scenic shorelines.

In total there are 165 mi (266 km) of hiking trails. There are also canoe/kayak routes, many involving portages, along coastal bays and inland lakes.

=== Services ===
The park has two developed areas:

Ozaagaateng (formerly Windigo), at the southwest end of the island (docking site for the ferries from Minnesota), with a campstore, showers, campsites, rustic camper cabins, and a boat dock.

Rock Harbor on the south side of the northeast end (docking site for the ferries from Michigan), with a campstore, showers, restaurant, lodge, campsites, and a boat dock. Non-camping sleeping accommodations at the park are limited to the lodge at Rock Harbor and the camper cabins at Ozaagaateng.

==== Camping ====
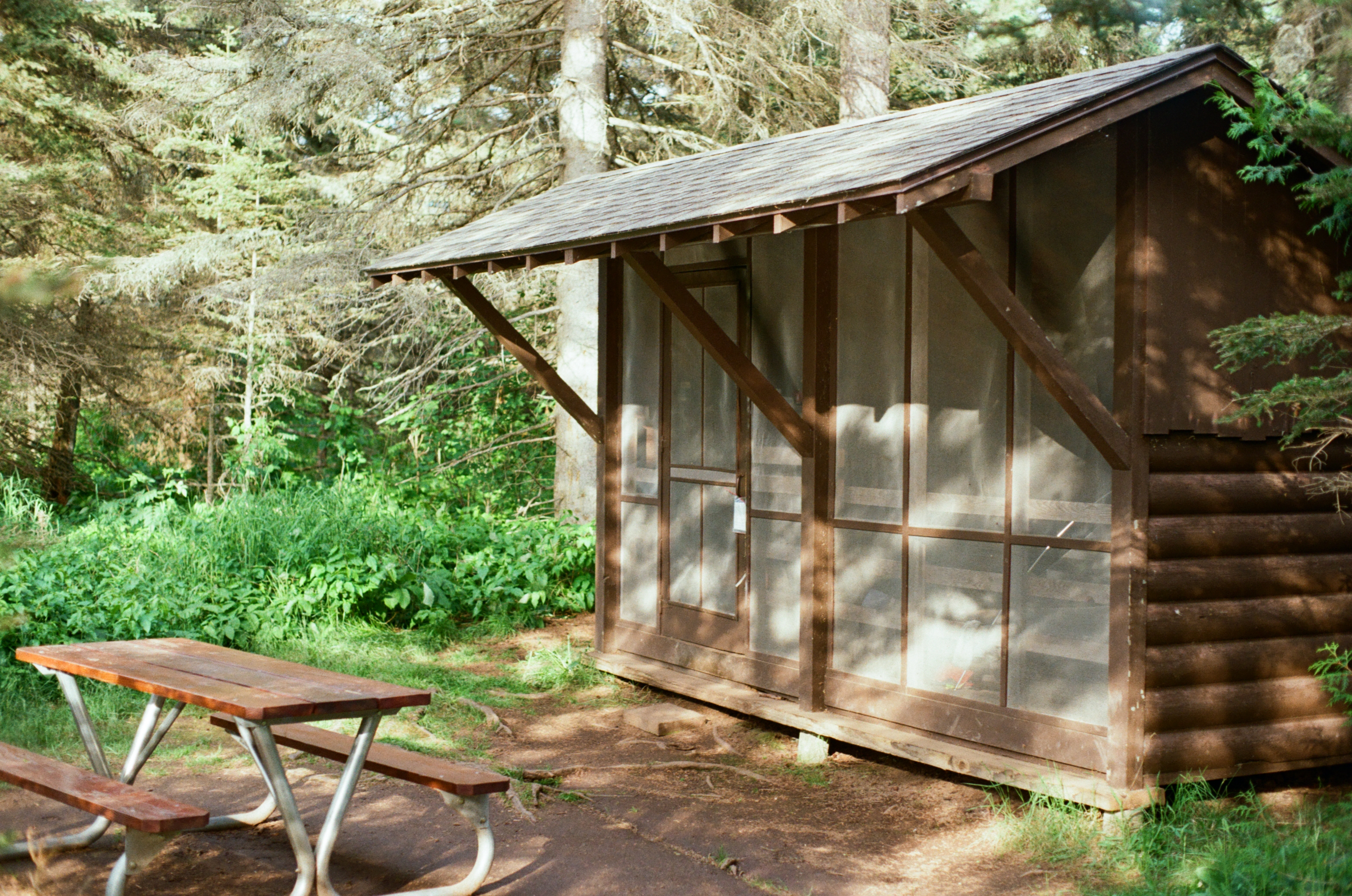
A typical three-sided screened shelter in Isle Royale National Park as seen at the Washington Creek campground.

The park has 36 designated wilderness campgrounds. Some campgrounds in the interior are accessible only by trail or by canoe/kayak on the island lakes. Other campgrounds are accessible only by private boat. The campsites vary in capacity but typically include a few three-sided wood shelters (the fourth wall is screened) with floors and roofs, and several individual sites suitable for pitching a small tent. Some tent sites with space for groups of up to 10 are available, and are used for overflow if all the individual sites are filled.

The only amenities at the campgrounds are pit toilets, picnic tables, and fire-rings at specific areas. Campfires are not permitted at most campgrounds; gas or alcohol camp stoves are recommended. Drinking and cooking water must be drawn from local water sources (Lake Superior and inland lakes) and filtered, treated, or boiled to avoid parasites. Hunting is not permitted, but fishing is, and edible berries (blueberries, thimbleberries) may be picked from the trail.

=== Access ===
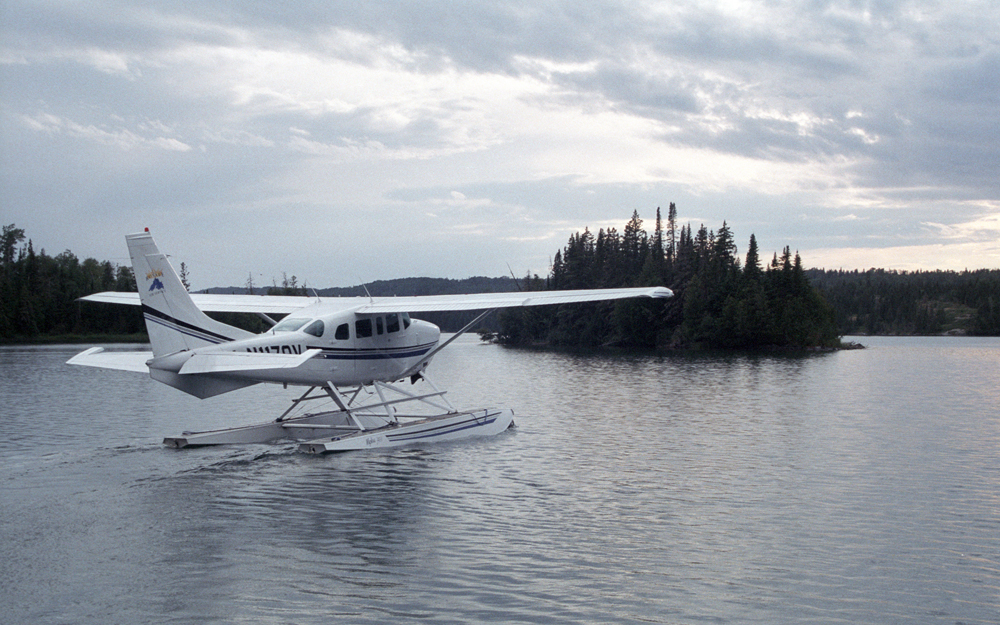
Floatplane taking off from Ozaagaateng on Washington Harbor—Beaver Island can be seen in the background at right

The park is accessible by ferries, floatplanes, and passenger ships during the summer months—from Houghton and Copper Harbor in Michigan and Grand Portage in Minnesota. Private boats travel to the island from the coasts of Michigan, Minnesota, and Ontario. Isle Royale is quite popular with day-trippers in private boats, and day-trip ferry service is provided from Copper Harbor and Grand Portage to and from the park.

Isle Royale is the only American national park to entirely close in the winter months, from November 1 through April 15, due to extreme weather conditions and for the safety and protection of visitors. Isle Royale is the least-visited national park in the contiguous United States, due to the winter closing and the distance across Lake Superior to reach the park. The average annual visitation was about 19,000 in the period from 2009 to 2018, with 25,798 visiting in 2018. Only three of the most remote Alaskan national parks—Lake Clark, Kobuk Valley and Gates of the Arctic—receive fewer visitors.

==== Ships ====
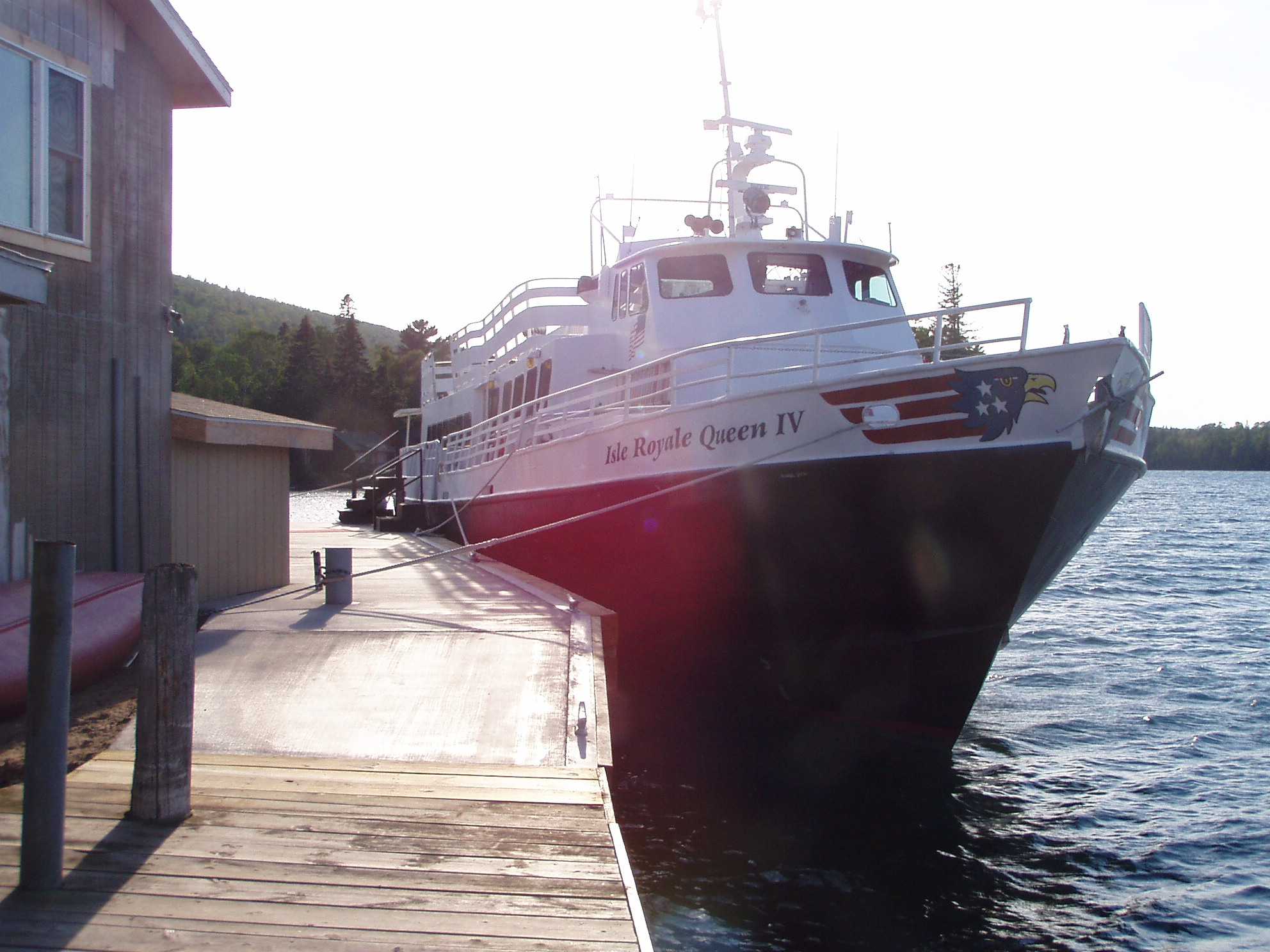
Isle Royale Queen IV at Copper Harbor

Scheduled ferry service operates from Grand Portage, Copper Harbor and Houghton.

The Grand Portage ferries reach the island in 1½ hours, and stay 4 hours at the island, allowing time for hiking, a guided hike or program by the park staff, and picnics.

The Isle Royale Queen serves park visitors out of Copper Harbor, on the northern Upper Peninsula coast of Michigan. It arrives at Rock Harbor in the park in 3 to 3½ hours and spends 3½ hours before returning to Copper Harbor.

The Sea Hunter operates round-trips and offers day trips to the Ozaagaateng visitor center through much of the season, and less frequently in early summer and autumn; it will transport kayaks and canoes for visitors wanting to explore the park from the water. It is the fastest ferry serving the island and arrives in 1½ hours, including some sightseeing points along the way out and back. Because of the relatively short boat ride, day visitors are able to get four hours on the island, and get back to the mainland earlier in the afternoon. This gives visitors on a tight schedule time to visit the Grand Portage National Monument or other attractions in the same day.

The Ranger III is a 165 ft (50 m) ship that serves park visitors from Houghton, Michigan to Rock Harbor. It is operated by the National Park Service, and is said to be the largest piece of equipment in the National Park system. It carries 125 passengers, along with canoes, kayaks, and even small powerboats. It is a six-hour voyage from Houghton to the park. The ship stays overnight at Rock Harbor before returning the next day, making two round trips each week from June to mid-September. Briefly in the 2008 season, the Ranger III carried visitors to and from Ozaagaateng. This was not continued after four trips, due to low interest and long crossing times. In 2012, Park Superintendent Phyllis Green required the Ranger III to purify its ballast water.

The Voyageur II, out of Grand Portage, crosses up to three times a week, overnighting at Rock Harbor and providing transportation between popular lakeside campgrounds. In the fall season, in addition to carrying campers and hikers, it provides day-trip service to Ozaagaateng on weekends. The Voyageur transports kayaks and canoes for visitors wanting to explore the island from the water. The Voyageur II and other boat taxi services ferry hikers to points along the island, allowing a one-way hike back to Rock Harbor or Ozaagaateng. Visitors may land at Rock Harbor and depart from Ozaagaateng several days later, or vice versa. Hikers frequently ride it in one direction to do a cross-island hike and then get picked up at the other end.

== See also ==
- List of islands in Isle Royale National Park
- List of fish of Isle Royale National Park
- List of birds of Isle Royale National Park
- List of national parks of the United States
- List of shipwrecks of Isle Royale
- National Register of Historic Places listings in Isle Royale National Park
