= Copper Harbor Light =

Lighthouse in Michigan, United States

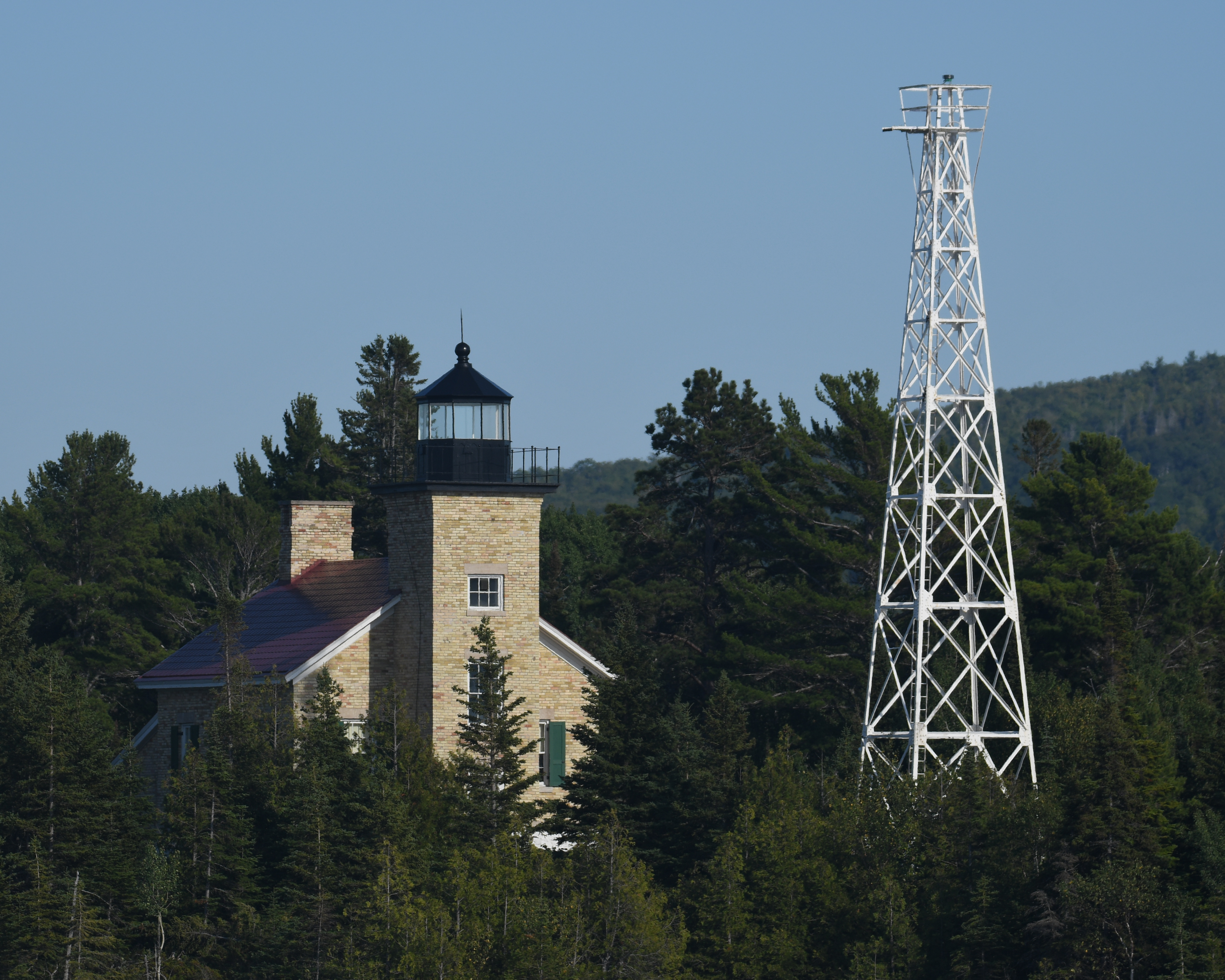
- Location: 9879 Woodland Rd. (Grant Township), Copper Harbor, Michigan
- Coordinates: 47°28′28.1″N 87°51′36.9″W

Tower
- Constructed: 1848
- Construction: brick
- Automated: 1919
- Height: Tower - 42 feet (13 m)
- Shape: square
- Markings: White skeleton tower w/black lantern
- Heritage: National Register of Historic Places listed place, Michigan State Historic Site

Light
- First lit: 1866
- Focal height: 90 feet (27 m)
- Lens: Fourth order Fresnel lens (original), 12-inch (300 mm) (current)
- Range: 21 nautical miles (39 km; 24 mi); 18 nautical miles (33 km; 21 mi) adjacent tower
- Characteristic: Fl Green, 6 sec
- Copper Harbor Light Station
- U.S. National Register of Historic Places
- Michigan State Historic Site
- Built: 1866
- NRHP reference No.: 12000305

Significant dates
- Added to NRHP: June 7, 2012
- Designated MSHS: February 22, 1974

The Copper Harbor Light is a lighthouse located in the harbor of Copper Harbor, Michigan USA on the Keweenaw Peninsula of Upper Michigan inside Fort Wilkins Historic State Park. It is a Michigan State Historic Site and listed on the National Register of Historic Places.

== History ==
The Copper Harbor Lighthouse was built on the tip of the eastern point of land that hugs the harbor. The lighthouse aided in the transport of copper from the Upper Peninsula. Ships carrying immigrants, supplies, and equipment increased dramatically.

Funding to build the light was approved in 1847. The first tower was constructed in 1848 and resembled that at Old Presque Isle Lighthouse. The Stone Masonry was dismantled, and the stones used as the foundation for the replacement lighthouse built in 1866.

The current lightkeeper's dwelling house is a survivor of the first light tower. An improved lighthouse, which also survives, was raised in 1866 three years before the installation of the Copper Harbor Front Range Light and the Copper Harbor Rear Range Light. The steel light tower in current use went into service in 1933.

The station was established in 1849. A Fresnel lens was installed in 1856. The current tower was first lit in 1866. It is no longer operational. It was automated in 1919, and deactivated in 1933. The foundation materials are dressed stone and timer, and the building was made of brick. The tower is square. The color is "natural with black lantern." A keeper's house is attached.

In 1933, the light itself was removed from the lighthouse, and placed on the adjacent 62-foot (19 m) tall white skeleton tower, which has a focal plane of 90 feet (27 m). It has a range of 14 nautical miles (26 km; 16 mi).

On February 22, 1974, the lighthouse was designated a Michigan State Historic Site. On June 7, 2012, it was listed on the National Register of Historic Places.

== Present ==
The Copper Harbor Lighthouse is currently (as of 2006) operated as a unit of the Michigan Department of History, Arts, and Libraries. It is open to the public in summer months and features a museum about the lighthouse and Lake Superior maritime history. Other buildings on the location include a detached 1849 dwelling house, which functioned as a storage and oil house.

A lighthouse tour is available, complete with a ride on a wooden double-ender launch. The boat leaves from the Municipal pier in Copper Harbor, typically taking 15 minutes to reach the point.

== See also ==
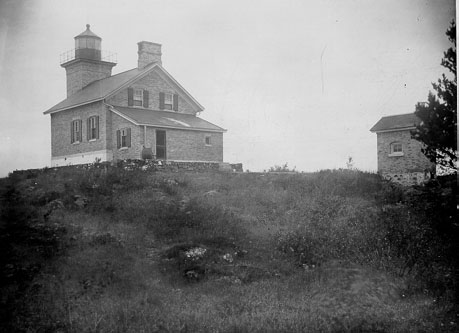
Original Lighthouse, U.S. Coast Guard Archive Photo

- Lighthouses in the United States
