= List of fishes of Isle Royale National Park =

This is a list of fishes that inhabit Isle Royale National Park. If the name is in bold it is a non-native species.

== Acipenseridae ==
- Lake sturgeon, Acipenser fulvescens

== Catostomidae ==
- Longnose sucker, Catostomus catostomus
- White sucker, Catostomus commersoni
- Shorthead redhorse, Moxostoma macrolepidotum

== Centrarchidae ==
- Rock bass, Ambloplites rupestris
- Pumpkinseed, Lepomis gibbosus
- Smallmouth bass, Micropterus dolomieu
- Black crappie, Pomoxis nigromaculatus

== Clupeidae ==
- **Alewife**, Alosa pseudoharengus

== Cottidae ==
- Fourhorn sculpin, Myoxocephalus quadricornis
- Mottled sculpin, Cottus bairdii
- Slimy sculpin, Cottus cognatus
- Spoonhead sculpin, Cottus ricei

== Cyprinidae ==
- Lake chub, Couesius plumbeus
- Brassy minnow, Hybognathus hankinsoni
- Allegheny pearl dace, Margariscus margarita
- Golden shiner, Notemigonus crysoleucas
- Emerald shiner, Notropis atherinoides
- Common shiner, Notropis cornutus
- Blackchin shiner, Notropis heterodon
- Blacknose shiner, Notropis heterolepis
  - Northern blacknose shiner, Notropis heterolepis heterolepis
  - Blacknose shiner, Notropis heterolepis regalis
- Spottail shiner, Notropis hudsonius
- Mimic shiner, Notropis volucellus
- Northern redbelly dace, Phoxinus eos
- Finescale dace, Phoxinus neogaeus
- Blacknose dace, Rhinichthys atratulus
- Longnose dace, Rhinichthys cataractae
- Eastern blacknose dace, Rhinichthys obtusus
- Creek chub, Semotilus atromaculatus
- Semotilus margarita
  - Harvey lake pearl dace, Semotilus margarita koelzi
  - Minnesota pearl dace, Semotilus margarita nachtriebi
- Fathead minnow, Pimephales promelas
  - Harvey lake fathead minnow, Pimephales promelas harveyensis
  - Fathead minnow, Pimephales promelas promelas

== Esocidae ==
- Northern pike, Esox lucius
- Muskellunge, Esox masquinongy

== Gasterosteidae ==
- Brook stickleback, Culaea inconstans
- Ninespine stickleback, Pungitius pungitius

== Lotidae ==
- Burbot, Lota lota

== Osmeridae ==
- **Rainbow smelt**, Osmerus mordax

== Percidae ==
- Iowa darter, Etheostoma exile
- Johnny darter, Etheostoma nigrum
- **Ruffe**, Gymnocephalus cernuus
- Logperch, Percina caprodes
- Yellow perch, Perca flavescens
- Sauger, Sander canadense
- Walleye, Sander vitreum

== Percopsidae ==
- Trout-perch, Percopsis omiscomaycus

== Petromyzontidae ==
- Northern brook lamprey, Ichthyomyzon fossor
- Silver lamprey, Ichthyomyzon unicuspis
- **Sea lamprey**, Petromyzon marinus

== Salmonidae ==
- Cisco, Coregonus artedi
  - Lake herring, Coregonus artedi arcturus
  - Lake herring, Coregonus artedi sargenti
- Siskiwit lake cisco, Coregonus bartlettii
- Lake whitefish, Coregonus clupeaformis
  - Great lakes whitefish, Coregonus clupeaformis clupeaformis
  - Lake desor whitefish, Coregonus clupeaformis dustini
  - Inland lakes whitefish, Coregonus clupeaformis neohantoniensis
- Big-eyed chub, Coregonus kiyi
- Blackfin cisco, Coregonus nigripinnis
- Shortnose cisco, Coregonus reighardi
- Shortjaw cisco, Coregonus zenithicus
- **Pink salmon**, Oncorhynchus gorbuscha
- **Coho salmon**, Oncorhynchus kisutch
- **Rainbow trout**, Oncorhynchus mykiss
- **Chinook salmon**, Oncorhynchus tshawytscha
- Pygmy whitefish, Prosopium coulterii
- Round whitefish, Prosopium cylindraceum
- Salmo oxyrinchus
- **Atlantic salmon**, Salmo salar
- **Brown trout**, Salmo trutta
- Brook trout, Salvelinus fontinalis
- Lake trout, Salvelinus namaycush
  - Lake trout, Salvelinus namaycush namaycush
  - Siscowet, Salvelinus namaycush siscowet
