= Edisen Fishery =

- U.S. National Register of Historic Places
- Michigan State Historic Site
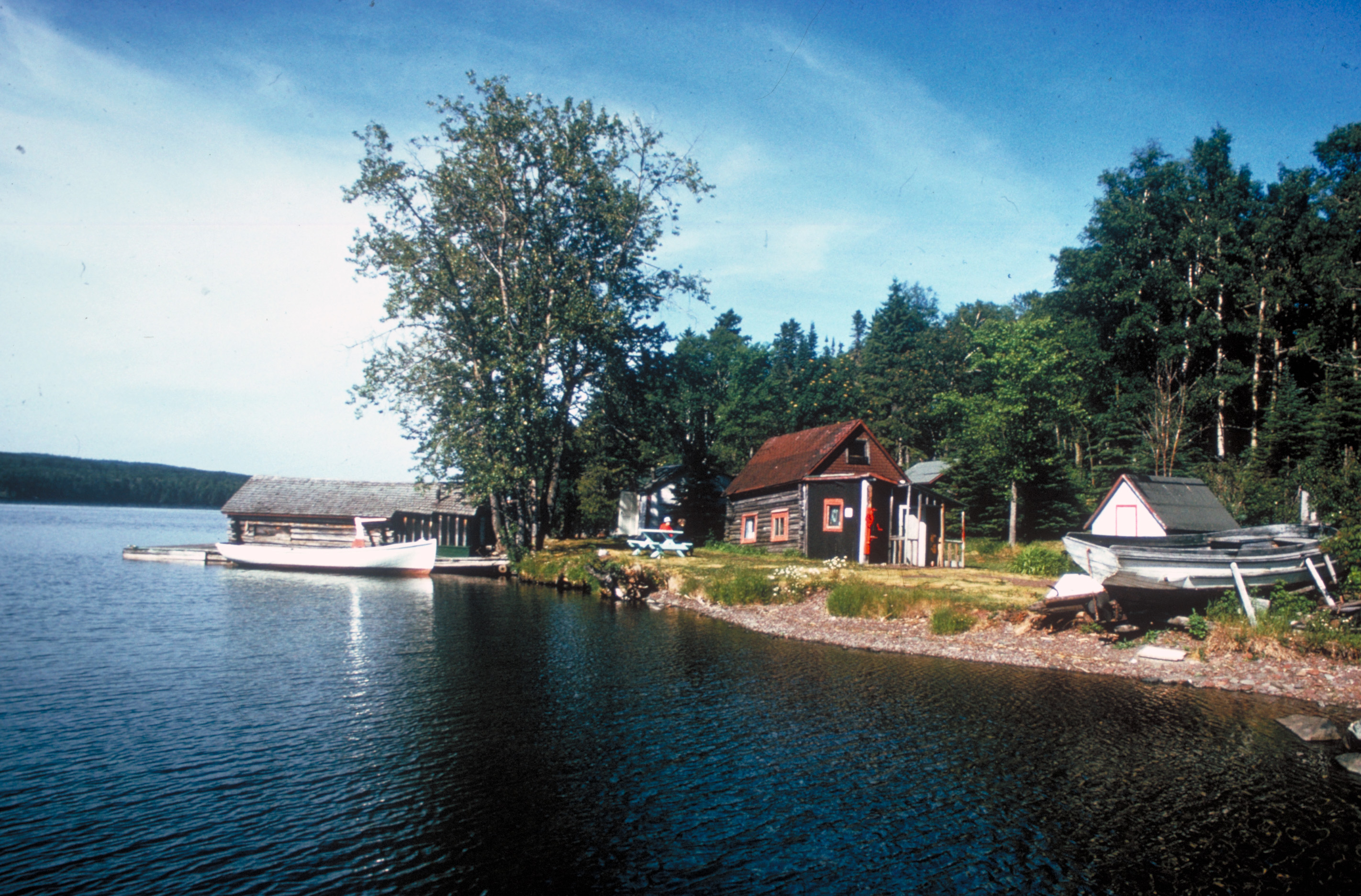

- Location within Michigan Location within the United States
- Interactive map
- Location: Rock Harbor, Isle Royale National Park, Michigan
- Coordinates: 48°5′22″N 88°34′57″W
- Built: 1895
- Architect: Multiple
- NRHP reference No.: 77000152

Significant dates
- Added to NRHP: March 08, 1977
- Designated MSHS: June 18, 1976

The Edisen Fishery is a fishery located in Rock Harbor in the Isle Royale National Park in Michigan. It was designated a Michigan State Historic Site in 1976 and listed on the National Register of Historic Places in 1977.

== Description ==
The Edisen Fishery is a collection of seven buildings making up a commercial fishery. The complex includes a single-story fish house and net house, cabins, a chicken coop, whaleboat, and ancillary docks and fishing equipment. All buildings are constructed from logs covered with tongue-and-groove siding.

Fish House: The fish house is a one-story gable roof building constructed half of horizontal logs with saddle notching, and half of frame construction with vertical flushboarding. It was constructed in 1900.

Residence: The house was also built in about 1900. It is a small one-story combination horizontal log and shiplapped building, with a gable roof and on a log foundation. There are two entrances to the three-room house, with random window locations. The interior has wooden tongue-in-groove floors.

Net House: The net house was constructed in 1895. It is a single-story building, built as a combination of saddle-notched, horizontal log construction on one half and a frame structure with a shed roof with horizontal planks on the other. The exterior is sheathed with tarpaper, and there is a simple plank door.

"Honeymoon" Cabin: An auxiliary sleeping cabin, built in 1925 by Peter Edisen. It is a one-story, one room, frame shiplapped structure built on a log foundation with a gable roof. A simple, two-paneled door is located on one elevation, and a small window on another.

Sleeping Cabin: Another sleeping cabin dates to 1895. It is a one-story building constructed of horizontal logs with saddle notching, and chinked with moss and cloth. It has a gable roof covered with asphalt. One elevation contains a vertical plank door.

Chicken Coop: The chicken coop was built in 1934. It is a frame, horizontal flushboarded building with a shallow-pitched gabled roof and log foundation. It contains a plank door and several windows.

Privy: The privy is of later construction, and is a frame building with horizontal plank walls and a shed roof sheathed with asphalt shingles. A vertical plank door is in one elevation.

== History ==
In the 1880s, the fishing industry around Isle Royale was booming due to the relative ease of shipping goods via refrigerated rail cars. The fishing population was composed primarily of Scandinavians fishing at Isle Royale in the April–November months, and returning to their homes on shore during the winter. Two such fishermen, a Mr. Mattson and Mr. Anderson, established this fishery, building a log cabin and net house in 1895, and a main residence and fish house in 1900. The buildings were constructed using easily available local materials and built using strictly functional designs. In 1905, Mike Johnson purchased this fishery. In 1916, Peter and Laura Edisen, Johnson's daughter and son-in-law, began fishing here. The fishery was in fact named for Pete Edisen, one of the last commercial fishermen on Isle Royale.

The Johnsons and Edisens added a sleeping cabin and chicken coop to the complex in 1925 and 1934, respectively. The Edisens lived in the net house until 1951, when they moved into the main residence and the net house was converted back to its original use. As of 2009, the fishery is still operational and open to the public.
