= Copper Harbor, Michigan =

- Census-designated place (CDP) & unincorporated community
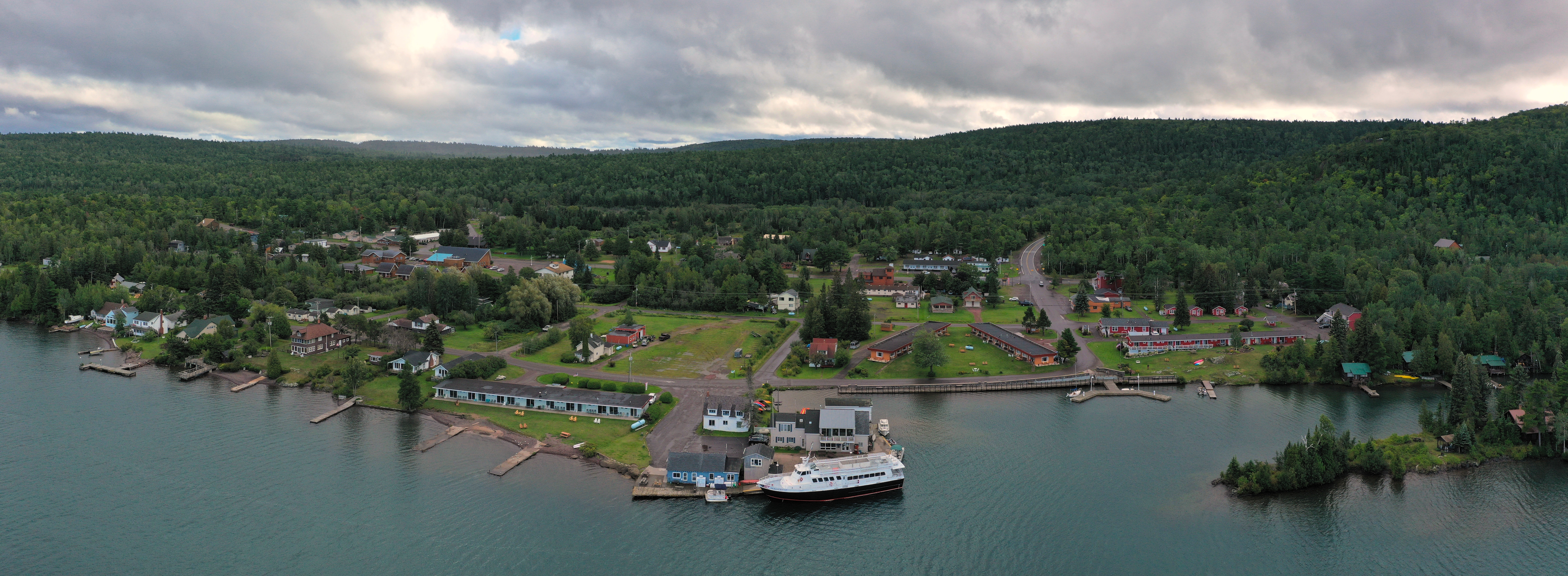
- Aerial view of the Copper Harbor community

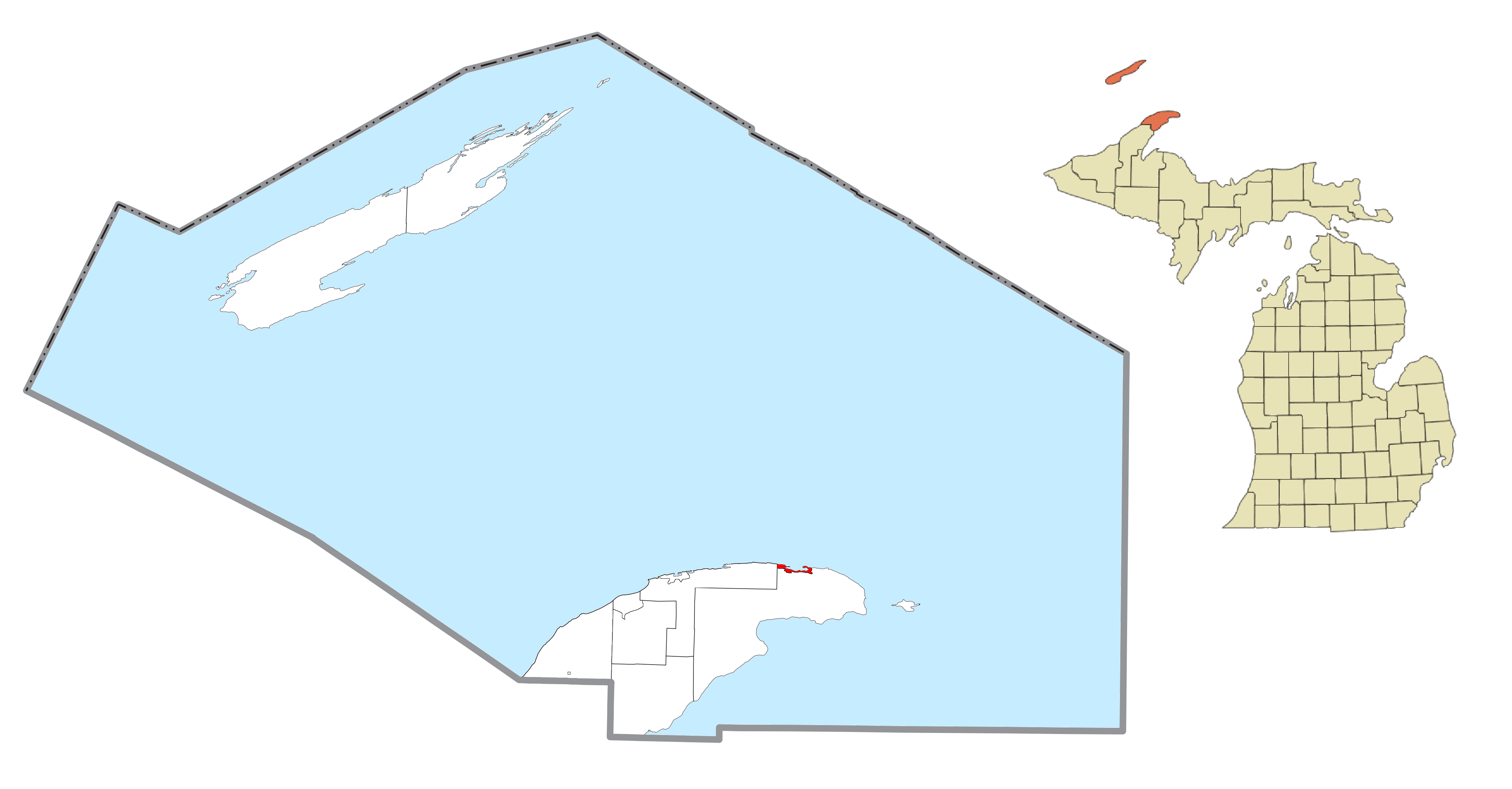
- Location within Keweenaw County

- Location within the state of Michigan Location within the United States
- Coordinates: 47°28′08″N 87°53′18″W
- Country: United States
- State: Michigan
- County: Keweenaw
- Township: Grant
- Established: 1844

Area
  - Total: 2.42 sq mi (6.28 km^{2})
  - Land: 1.51 sq mi (3.92 km^{2})
  - Water: 0.92 sq mi (2.37 km^{2})
- Elevation: 605 ft (184 m)

Population (2020)
  - Total: 136
  - Density: 89.9/sq mi (34.71/km^{2})
- Time zone: UTC−5 (Eastern (EST))
  - Summer (DST): UTC−4 (EDT)
- ZIP code(s): 49918; 49950 (Mohawk)
- Area code: 906
- FIPS code: 26-18100
- GNIS feature ID: 623809
- Website: Copper Harbor

Copper Harbor is an unincorporated community and census-designated place (CDP) located in Keweenaw County in the U.S. state of Michigan. It is located within Grant Township. The population of the CDP was 136 as of the 2020 census.

The community is located at the northern tip of the Keweenaw Peninsula and is the northernmost permanently populated community in the state. Due to its natural environment and surroundings, which include Fort Wilkins Historic State Park, Copper Harbor is marketed as an all-season tourist destination.

== Etymology ==
The community takes its name from its harbor, which served as a port for shipping copper mined from local deposits during the mid-19th century.

The harbor in turn acquired its name prior to the 19th-century copper boom, due to the presence of a green copper-bearing vein in a rock on Hayes Point at the harbor entrance. This prominent rock was known to voyageurs as la roche verte.

== History ==
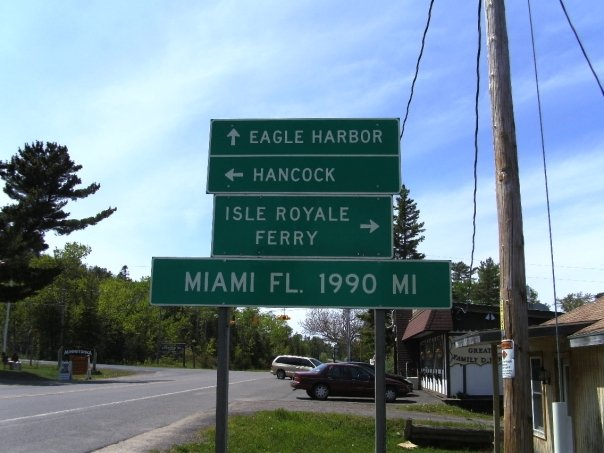
A mileage sign along US Highway 41 (US 41) in Copper Harbor, giving the distance to Miami, Florida, the highway's southern terminus.

The Keweenaw Peninsula and the area that would become the Copper Country was home to the Ojibwe people prior to European settlement. By the 1842 Treaty of La Pointe, which took effect in 1843, the Ojibwe officially ceded the western Upper Peninsula including the Keweenaw to the United States.

Copper Harbor was host to the first mineral land agency throughout the entire Lake Superior District. Captain Walter Cunningham was appointed by the United States Department of War to act as a Special Agent to the area. As soon as wayfinding was established in the spring of 1843, Cunningham had come to the area and opened his office, which was thereafter named the "Government House". It was positioned on Porter's Island, a small rocky island just opposite of present-day downtown Copper Harbor.

The Pittsburgh and Boston Copper Harbor Mining Company, formed by John Hayes of Cleveland, Ohio, began excavating some pits near Hayes Point in Copper Harbor in 1844. It was a small development at first, but its mine was modern for its time, and the company struck it rich in 1845. The Pittsburgh and Boston mine operations were some of the first in the state of Michigan.

A few years later, the Central Mine, Cliff Mine, and others were opened and became successful. However, by 1870 the copper resources in the community had been largely worked out.

The community of Copper Harbor was listed as a newly organized census-designated place for the 2010 census, meaning it now has officially defined boundaries and population statistics.

== Geography ==
In 2010, Copper Harbor was listed as a census-designated place. The CDP contains a total area of 2.43 square miles (6.29 km^{2}), of which 1.51 square miles (3.91 km^{2}) is land and 0.92 square miles (2.38 km^{2}) (37.86%) is water.

Copper Harbor is located at the northern edge of the Keweenaw Peninsula, which also extends for several miles to the east. Copper Harbor has its own post office and ZIP Code (49918). Some areas within the community and the surrounding area may use the Mohawk 49950 ZIP Code.

Beyond the community center, there are thick forests, limited roadways, and few developments.

Relative to other communities in the Keweenaw, Copper Harbor is 9 miles (14.5 km) from Mandan, 12 miles (19.3 km) north of Delaware, and 16 miles (25.7 km) east of Eagle Harbor. The village of Ahmeek is the nearest incorporated community at 30 miles (48.3 km) to the southwest.

=== Climate ===
Copper Harbor has a humid continental climate. Summers are warm but rarely hot due to the moderating influence of Lake Superior, while winters are cold and snowy, albeit milder than areas on similar parallels to the west, due to the low-scale maritime moderation. Although winter temperatures are similar to those in the nearest large metropolitan city Minneapolis, a couple of degrees latitude south-west, the main difference is that April is also a winter month in Copper Harbor, since the marine effects delay spring. The temperature lag effect is so great that March holds the town's record low, and April's record low temperatures are not much warmer than those of December.

Climate data for Copper Harbor, Michigan (Fort Wilkins Historic State Park), 1991–2020 normals, extremes 1972–2020
Month	Jan	Feb	Mar	Apr	May	Jun	Jul	Aug	Sep	Oct	Nov	Dec	Year
Record high °F (°C)	46 (8)	55 (13)	75 (24)	80 (27)	89 (32)	94 (34)	99 (37)	94 (34)	95 (35)	83 (28)	71 (22)	56 (13)	99 (37)
Mean maximum °F (°C)	38.8 (3.8)	43.2 (6.2)	53.5 (11.9)	65.1 (18.4)	78.6 (25.9)	84.1 (28.9)	86.9 (30.5)	86.1 (30.1)	82.0 (27.8)	72.6 (22.6)	55.4 (13.0)	43.7 (6.5)	89.1 (31.7)
Mean daily maximum °F (°C)	22.8 (−5.1)	24.6 (−4.1)	33.8 (1.0)	44.0 (6.7)	57.4 (14.1)	67.1 (19.5)	73.2 (22.9)	73.4 (23.0)	66.0 (18.9)	51.9 (11.1)	39.0 (3.9)	28.5 (−1.9)	48.5 (9.2)
Daily mean °F (°C)	17.0 (−8.3)	17.4 (−8.1)	25.6 (−3.6)	36.0 (2.2)	48.0 (8.9)	56.7 (13.7)	63.8 (17.7)	64.9 (18.3)	58.1 (14.5)	45.4 (7.4)	33.4 (0.8)	23.4 (−4.8)	40.8 (4.9)
Mean daily minimum °F (°C)	11.2 (−11.6)	10.1 (−12.2)	17.4 (−8.1)	28.1 (−2.2)	38.5 (3.6)	46.4 (8.0)	54.4 (12.4)	56.3 (13.5)	50.3 (10.2)	38.9 (3.8)	27.8 (−2.3)	18.2 (−7.7)	33.1 (0.6)
Mean minimum °F (°C)	−2.9 (−19.4)	−6.0 (−21.1)	−3.0 (−19.4)	15.3 (−9.3)	28.8 (−1.8)	37.4 (3.0)	45.5 (7.5)	46.6 (8.1)	38.8 (3.8)	28.8 (−1.8)	15.0 (−9.4)	3.2 (−16.0)	−6.7 (−21.5)
Record low °F (°C)	−18 (−28)	−22 (−30)	−23 (−31)	−2 (−19)	16 (−9)	31 (−1)	42 (6)	32 (0)	30 (−1)	21 (−6)	−5 (−21)	−11 (−24)	−23 (−31)
Average precipitation inches (mm)	2.24 (57)	1.89 (48)	1.70 (43)	2.68 (68)	3.55 (90)	3.07 (78)	3.02 (77)	2.63 (67)	3.71 (94)	3.72 (94)	2.60 (66)	2.33 (59)	33.14 (842)
Source: NOAA

=== Notable attractions ===
- Hunter's Point is the name of a flat point, running out from the west into Lake Superior. It was named for an early settler of the area named Hunter who owned a tract of land on what is now Hunter's Point. He is buried in the Fort Wilkins Cemetery. Today, Hunter's Island is a Grant Township park, hosting a wide variety of both flora and fauna alike. It is also a well-known stop for migratory birds.
- Just outside the town is the northern terminus of U.S. Highway 41 (US 41), which runs 1,990 miles (3,203 km) from Copper Harbor to Miami, Florida.
- Just east of downtown Copper Harbor is Fort Wilkins Historic State Park, an early restored frontier United States Army base originally built in 1844 to protect the vital port of Copper Harbor from the Ojibwe during the early years of the copper mining boom, America's first great mining rush. It became clear later that issues in the region were their own—rough and icy winters, isolation, and sheer loneliness.

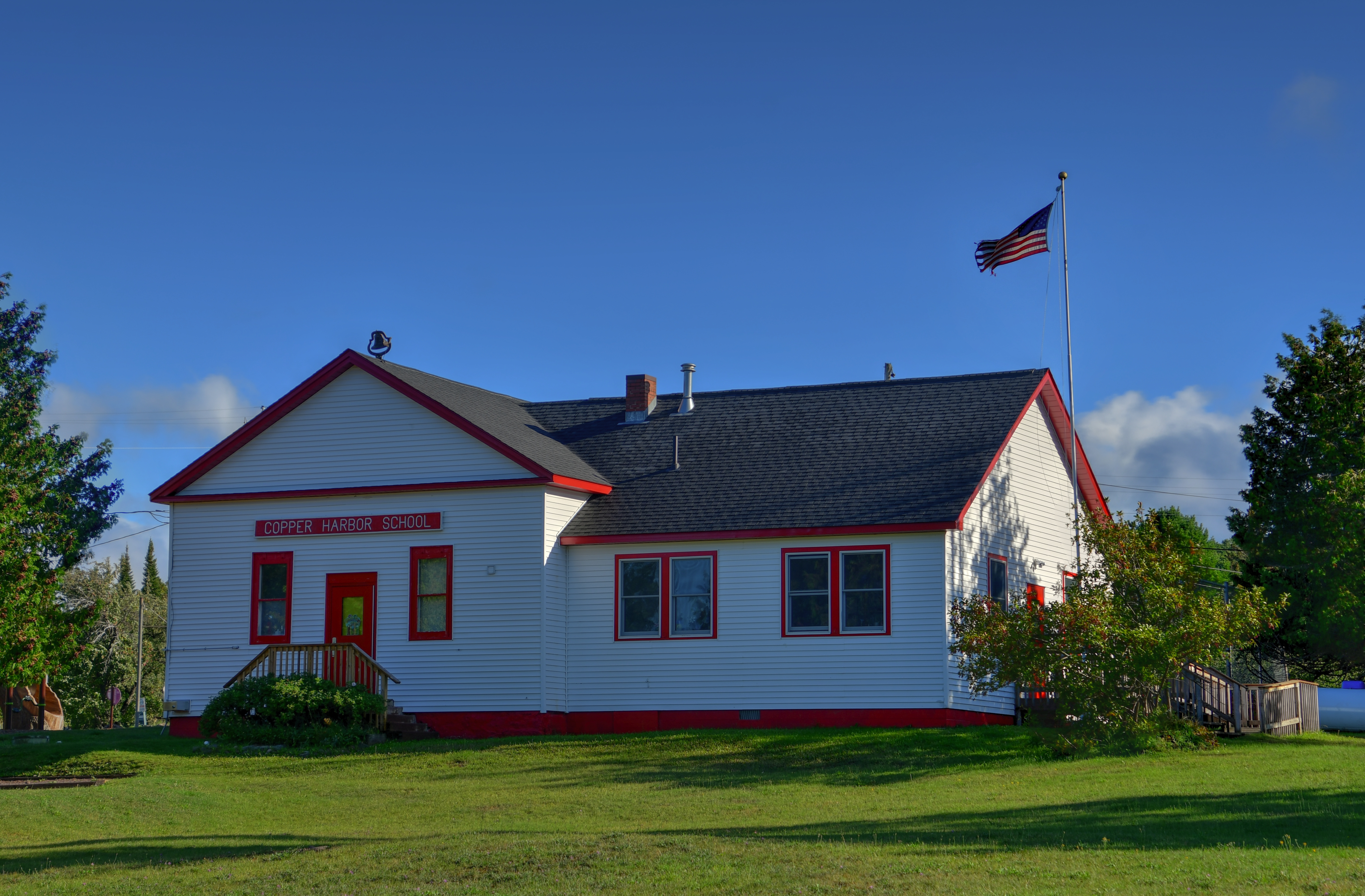
Copper Harbor Schoolhouse in 2020

- The Copper Harbor Schoolhouse, one of the oldest one-room schools in Michigan, is found here. In 1999, this 140-year-old school had nine students who attended classes. The school district it lies in is called Grant Township Schools, District No. 2. The District motto is "Searching For Knowledge" and the mascot of the schoolhouse is the Copper Harbor Prospectors.
- Copper Harbor is home to a Fourth of July fireworks show that is locally notable on the Keweenaw Peninsula.
- Lake Fanny Hooe, named after the mining Captain William Albutrtis' juvenile sister-in-law, borders Fort Wilkins and is well known in the area for the origin of its name. This lake is one mile east of Copper Harbor, and runs parallel with US 41. The lake is two miles (3.2 km) long and one-quarter mile (0.40 km) wide, with a total depth of 35 feet (11 m) and numerous points.
- The historic Copper Harbor Lighthouse is situated at the opening of the physical harbor itself. The lighthouse was rebuilt in 1866, replacing an original light from 1849, and is only accessible via a short ride in a compact, open vessel from the Copper Harbor Marina. Taken out of service in 1933, the historic navigational aid is one of the oldest lighthouses on Lake Superior. Within the yellow-bricked maritime post, furnishings from the era remain to conceptualize the life of the lighthouse keepers. Exhibits in the lighthouse museum cover both the lighthouse's history and the local shipwreck culture of the area.
- The historic Copper Harbor Cemetery discloses the gravestones of some of the earliest settlers in the Copper Country, with the first recorded interment in 1853 and a number of other tombstones that predate the year 1900.
- Characterized as "the most beautiful road in Michigan," Brockway Mountain Drive is a 8.9-mile (14.3 km) roadway that follows the spine of a 735-foot (224 m) ridge between the communities of Copper Harbor and Eagle Harbor, and it is the highest-paved road between the Rocky Mountains to the west and the Allegheny Mountains in the east. The road was constructed during the 1930s in the midst of the Great Depression by the Works Progress Administration. It offers views of Lake Superior, and the Keweenaw Peninsula, as well the archipelago of Isle Royale on an especially clear, transparent day. There is also a close on the drive called Brockway Mountain Lookout that offers a view of the community of Copper Harbor itself.
- In addition to the main 1849 Copper Harbor Lighthouse, the Copper Harbor Front Range and Rear Range Lights, both completed in 1869, remain and are locally considered to be iconic, as well as being the subject of memorabilia. The purpose of the Copper Harbor Range Lights was to do what the main lighthouse could not; it guided vessels and their sailors past the hazardous reefs on either side of the waterway.

== Demographics ==
Historical population
Census	Pop.	Note	%±
2010	108		—
2020	136		25.9%
U.S. Decennial Census

According to the 2020 census, the CDP had a population of 136. According to the 2021 American Community Survey, its median household income was $54,583.

== Gallery ==
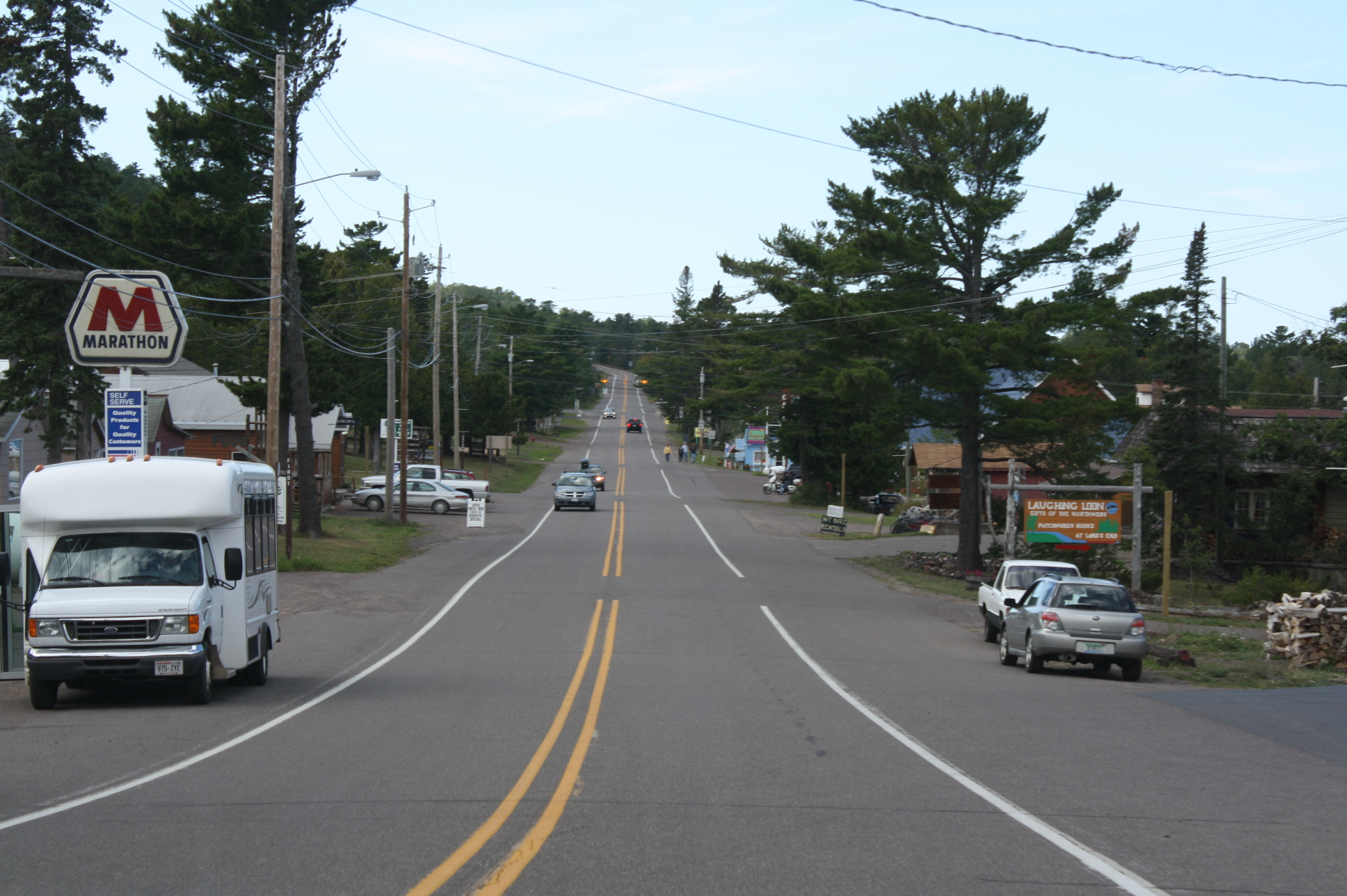
US 41 through Copper Harbor

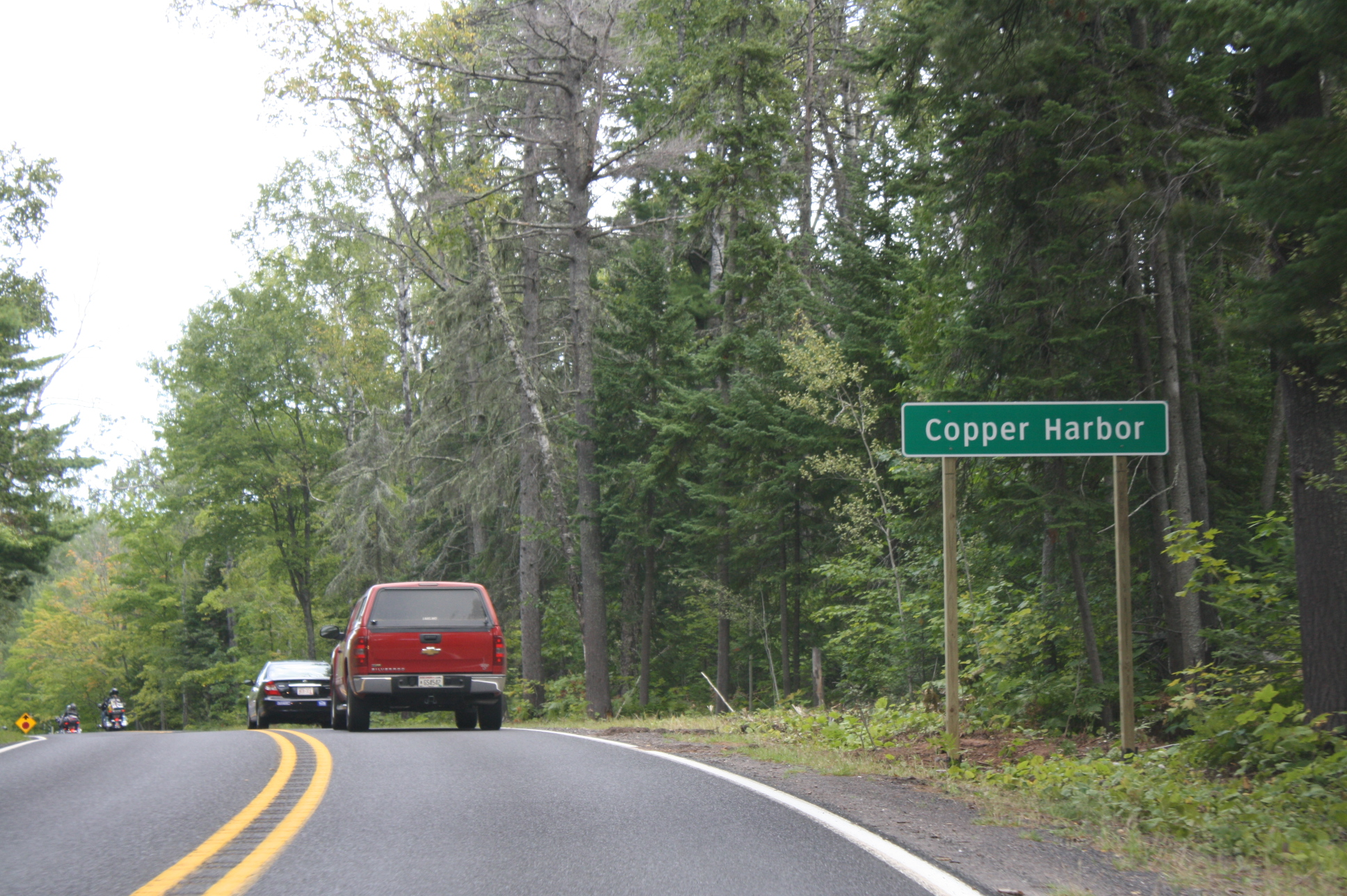
Signage along US 41

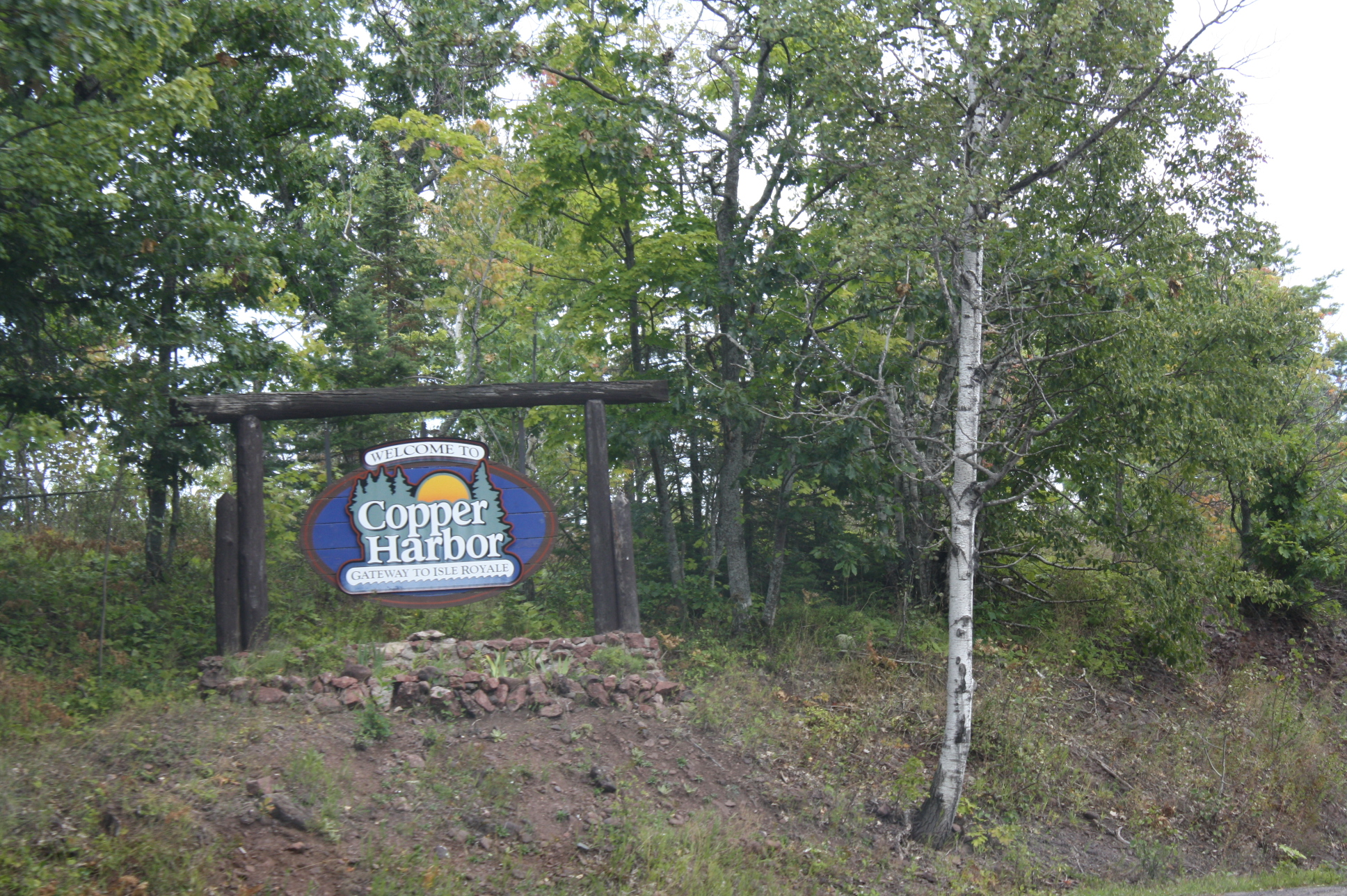
Copper Harbor welcome sign

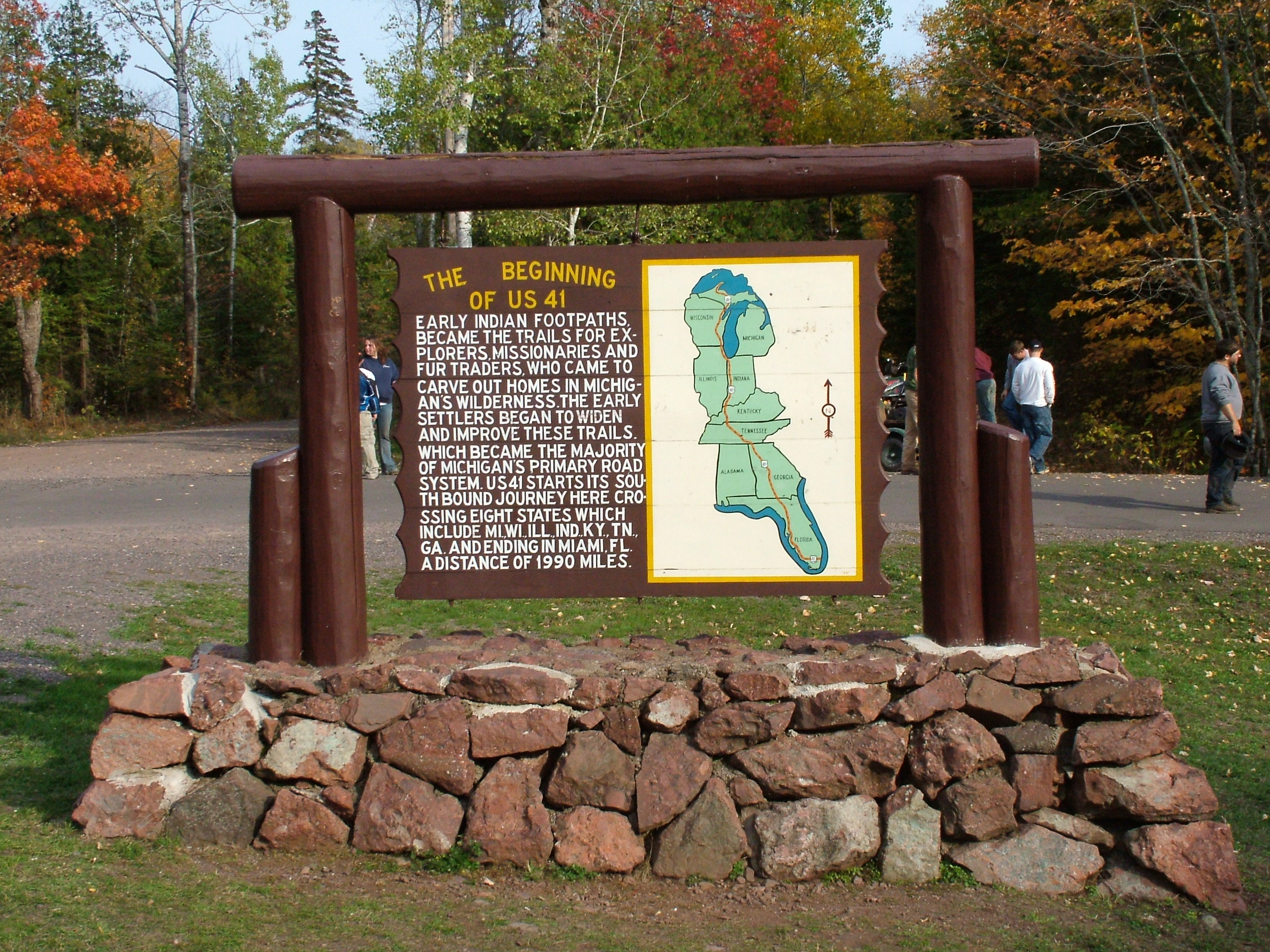
Northern terminus of US 41, October 2006

== Transportation ==
=== Highways ===
- US 41 travels through Copper Harbor and has its northernmost terminus just east of the community.
- M-26 has its northernmost terminus at US 41 within the western portion of the community.

=== Ferry services ===
Copper Harbor contains a ferry port that provides transportation to Isle Royale National Park. The Isle Royale Line, Inc. (formerly named Isle Royale Ferry Service) operates the Isle Royale Queen IV out of Copper Harbor during the warmer months from May to September. The ferry takes 3.5 hours to travel 60 miles (97 km) across Lake Superior to Rock Harbor.

== See also ==
- Copper mining in Michigan
- Shipwrecks of the 1913 Great Lakes storm
