= Ranger III =

Passenger and cargo ship

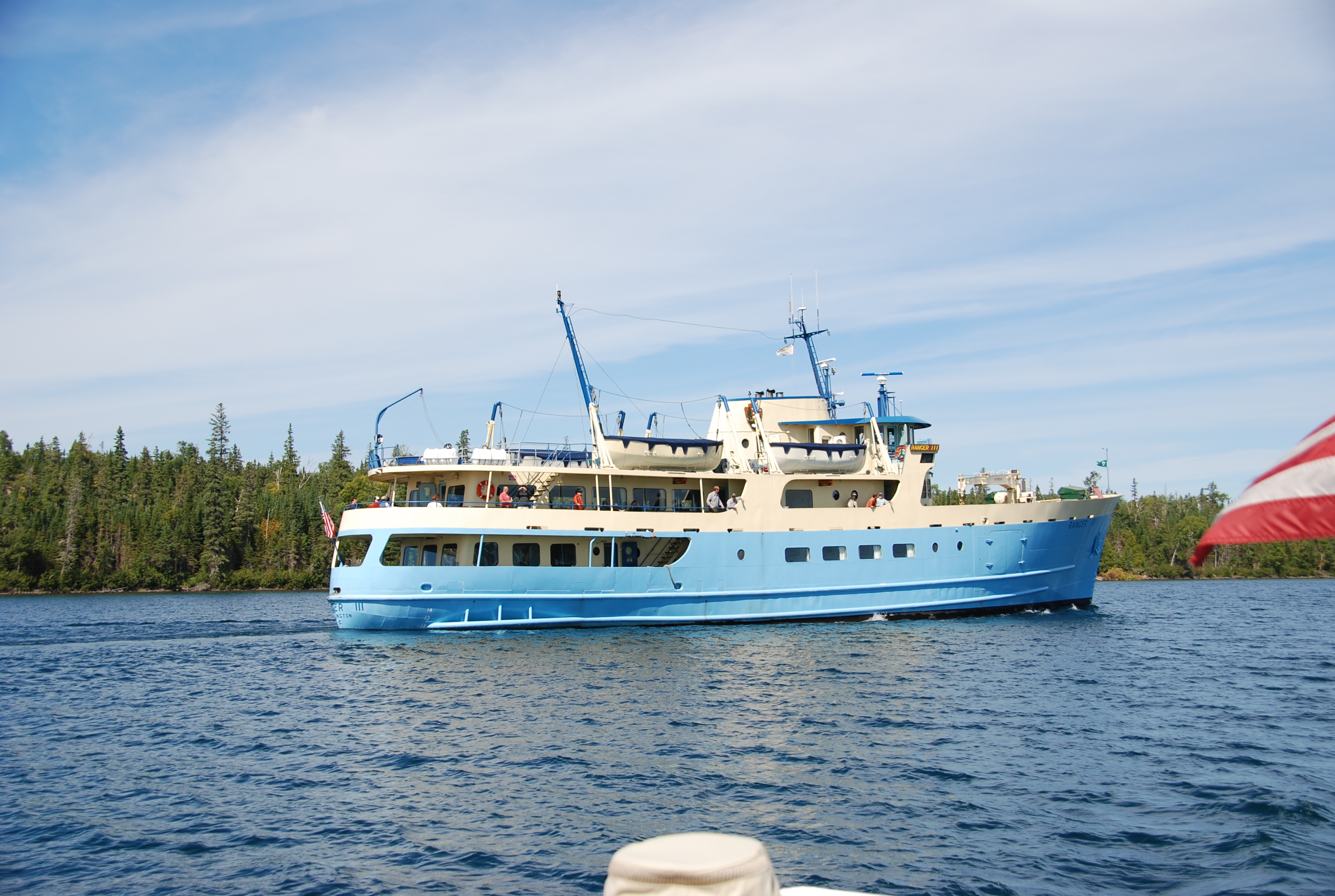
- Ranger III at Isle Royale National Park

History
- Name: Ranger III (1958–2016)
- Port of registry: Washington, D.C., United States; Norfolk, Virginia, United States
- Builder: FMG Bay Shipbuilding, Sturgeon Bay, Wisconsin, United States
- Launched: 21 June 1958
- Completed: 1958
- Identification: Call sign: WZ2056; IMO number: 7618234; MMSI number: 338016759

General characteristics
- Type: General cargo ship
- Tonnage: 648 GT; 319 NT; 168 DWT
- Displacement: 650
- Length: 45.77 m (150.16 ft)
- Beam: 10.36 m (33.99 ft)
- Draught: 10 ft 6 in (3.20 m)
- Depth: 4.62 m (15.16 ft)
- Propulsion: Twin 850 hp 3508-B Caterpillar
- Speed: 15.7 kn (18.1 mph; 29.1 km/h)
- Complement: 6 (freight), 9 (passengers)

Ranger III is a 648-ton vessel built to carry visitors to Isle Royale National Park, on Lake Superior. She was built in 1958, and has undergone several refits. The vessel is designed to carry 125 passengers, as well as 100 tons of cargo. She is designed to be operated by a crew of six when only carrying cargo, and by a crew of nine, when carrying passengers.

The vessel she replaced, Ranger II, was a war-surplus, wooden-hulled former minesweeper. The first Ranger was also a wooden-hulled military surplus vessel.

As built, she was powered by a pair of two-stroke diesel engines, generating 614 shaft horsepower (458 kW), which were replaced by a pair of conventional diesel engines, generating 850 shaft horsepower (630 kW). While the vessel is capable of light ice-breaking, in late spring or early fall, the heavy ice of winter requires shutting service down.

In 2012 the vessel's ballast water system was upgraded. Ballast water is subjected to filtration and ultraviolet light. The Milwaukee Journal-Sentinel published a series of articles on the threats invasive species posed to vulnerable native species, which praised the National Park Service's initiative in equipping Ranger III with a state of the art system.

While other vessels carry some of the visitors to the park, Ranger III removes all their trash.

== Operational history ==
On 4 August 2010, the Portage Lake Lift Bridge became stuck position trying to lift for the "Ranger". The lift span did not seat properly on the desk, causing the deck to be a bit askew.

On 29 July 2015, Isle Royale Queen IV ran aground, and Ranger III was called upon to bring the other vessel's passengers to the mainland.

On 23 July 2016, the Portage Lake Lift Bridge broke down while Ranger was passing under it.

== Replacement ==
The National Park Service is considering replacing Ranger III, either with a more modern vessel of similar capability, or several smaller, more specialized vessels.
