= Copper Harbor Front Range Light =

Lighthouse in Michigan, United States

- Location: Copper Harbor, Michigan, United States
- Coordinates: 47°28′52″N 87°52′00″W

The Copper Harbor Front Range Light is in Copper Harbor, Michigan.

While the Copper Harbor Light effectively illuminated the area of the harbor, it failed to guide mariners through the narrow opening of rocks at its entrance. Construction on the range lights were completed in 1869.

According to US Government publication, "The American Practical Navigator", Chapter 5: "Range lights are light pairs that indicate a specific line of position when they are in line. The higher rear light is placed behind the front light. When the mariner sees the lights vertically in line, he is on the range line. If the front light appears left of the rear light, the observer is to the right of the range line; if the front appears to the right of the rear, the observer is left of the range line."

It is considered to be iconic, and has been the subject of memorabilia.

== See also ==
- Copper Harbor Light
- Lighthouses in the United States
