= Passage Island Light =

Lighthouse in Michigan, United States

Passage Island Light Station
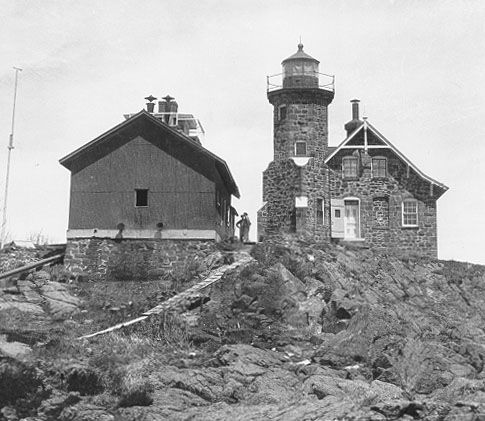
- Undated USCG photo of the station
- Location: SW end of Passage Is., 3.25 mi NE of Isle Royale, in NW Lake Superior, Houghton Township, Michigan
- Coordinates: 48°13′27″N 88°21′57″W

Tower
- Constructed: 1882
- Construction: fieldstone
- Automated: 1978
- Height: 44 feet (13 m)
- Markings: natural with white & red lantern
- Heritage: National Register of Historic Places listed place

Light
- First lit: 1882
- Lens: Fourth order Fresnel lens (original), 7.5-inch (190 mm) (current)
- Passage Island Light Station
- U.S. National Register of Historic Places
- Architect: U.S. Lighthouse Board
- Architectural style: Gothic
- MPS: Light Stations of the United States MPS
- NRHP reference No.: 06000632
- Added to NRHP: July 19, 2006

The Passage Island Light Station is a lighthouse located 3.25 mi (5.23 km) NE of Isle Royale, in NW Lake Superior, Michigan on Passage Island. It was listed on the National Register of Historic Places in 2006.

== Description ==
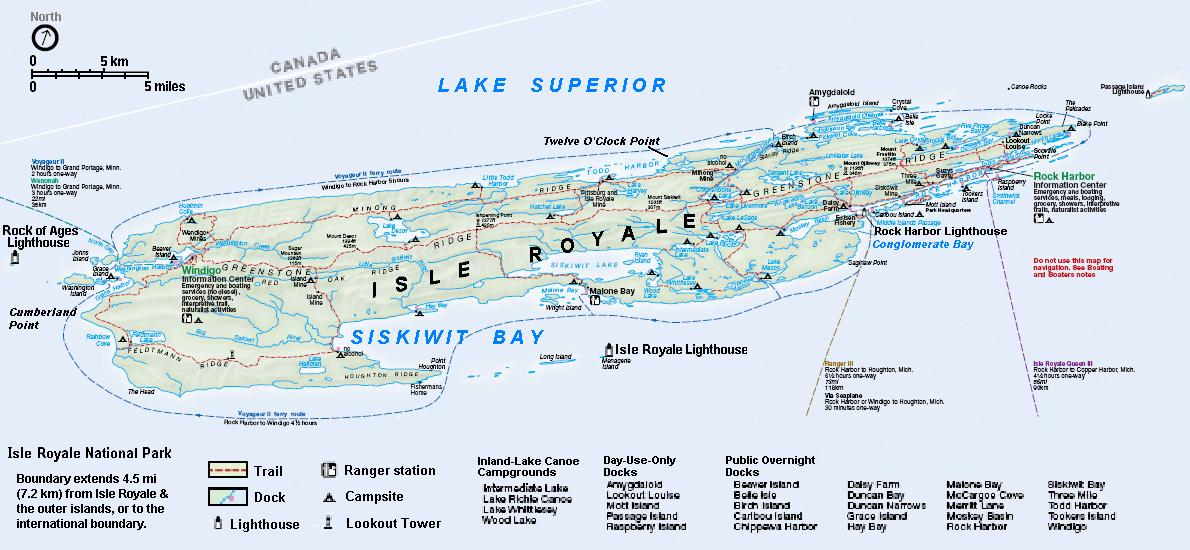
Passage Island Lighthouse (far right) is located on a small island, off the east coast of Isle Royale (right-click image to enlarge).

The light tower is 44 feet (13 m) high, constructed of field stone, and is square on the first level, transitioning to octagonal above. It is topped with a ten-sided cast iron lantern, accessible via a spiral staircase within the tower. The tower is integral with the keeper's house, which is a two-story field stone house measuring 26 by 30 feet (7.9 by 9.1 m).

== History ==
The need for a lighthouse between Passage Island and Isle Royale was recognized as early as the 1860s, as lake traffic increased dramatically due to the upsurge in mining in the Upper Peninsula. However, it took until 1875 before Congress authorized funds for the construction of a lighthouse. However, because of Congress's desire to bring political pressure to bear on the Canadian government to force them to build a lighthouse in Lake Erie, the appropriated $18,000 for Pasage Light was not released until 1880. Construction began in 1881, and the light was completed the following year. A fog signal was added in 1884, and in 1894 a new flashing white lens manufactured by Barbier, Benard & Turenne of Paris was installed.

In 1978, the station was automated, and in 1989 a 7.5-inch (190 mm) acrylic lens was installed, replacing the Fresnel.
