= National Register of Historic Places listings in Isle Royale National Park =

This is a list of the National Register of Historic Places listings in Isle Royale National Park.

This is intended to be a complete list of the properties and districts on the National Register of Historic Places in Isle Royale National Park, Michigan, United States. The locations of National Register properties and districts for which the latitude and longitude coordinates are included below, may be seen in a Google map.

There are 21 properties and districts listed on the National Register in the park.

This National Park Service list is complete through NPS recent listings posted May 15, 2026.

== Current listings ==
| | Name on the Register | Image | Date listed | Location | City or town | Description |
|---|---|---|---|---|---|---|
| 1 | ALGOMA | ALGOMA | June 14, 1984 (#84001699) | Southeast shore of Mott Island; 48°06′41″N 88°31′55″W | Isle Royale National Park | The Algoma was a passenger steamer built in 1883. In November 1885, it ran into a blinding snowstorm, veered off course, and ran aground near Isle Royale. As the storm continued to rage, the ship came apart, eventually killing 46 people. The wreck of the Algoma was the worst loss of life in the history of Lake Superior shipping. |
| 2 | AMERICA | AMERICA | June 14, 1984 (#84001708) | North Gap of Washington Harbor; 47°53′39″N 89°13′15″W | Isle Royale National Park | The America served as a communications link for the communities of western Lake Superior in the early 20th century. Beginning in 1902, she ran three voyages per week among Duluth, Minnesota, Isle Royale, and Thunder Bay, Ontario, as well as numerous small communities in between. In June 1928, the America ran aground while leaving Washington Harbor, and efforts to salvage her were unsuccessful. The ship can be seen from the surface, with her bow in only two feet of water. |
| 3 | CHESTER A. CONGDON | CHESTER A. CONGDON | June 14, 1984 (#84001716) | Congdon Shoals on northeast end of Isle Royale; 48°11′36″N 88°30′52″W | Isle Royale National Park | Originally named the Salt Lake City, when constructed in 1907, the bulk steel freighter sank near Isle Royale in Lake Superior in 1918. It was the first wreck in Lake Superior to be valued at over one million dollars. |
| 4 | CUMBERLAND | CUMBERLAND | June 14, 1984 (#84001732) | Near Rock of Ages Light; 47°51′28″N 89°19′32″W | Isle Royale National Park | The Cumberland was a wooden-hulled side paddlewheeler built in 1871. In July 1877, she began taking on water after leaving Thunder Bay, and struck a reef near the Rock of Ages Light. The day was clear and dry, and passengers and crew were removed without difficulty. The wreckage of the Cumberland is intermingled with some portions of the hull of the Henry Chisholm, which sank later in 1898. |
| 5 | Edisen Fishery | Edisen Fishery | March 8, 1977 (#77000152) | Rock Harbor; 48°05′22″N 88°34′57″W | Isle Royale National Park | The Edisen Fishery is a collection of seven buildings making up a commercial fishery, constructed between 1895 and 1934 by local fishermen using easily available local materials and built using strictly functional designs. |
| 6 | EMPEROR | EMPEROR | June 14, 1984 (#84001748) | North side of Canoe Rocks, on the northeast end of Isle Royale; 48°12′02″N 88°29′30″W | Isle Royale National Park | The Emperor was a freighter constructed in 1910, and at 525 feet in length, it was the largest Canadian-built freighter ever built at the time of her launching. In June 1947, the Emperor left Thunder Bay, laden with 10,429 tons of iron ore. Her course was miscalculated, and the ship ran aground at 4:15 in the morning on the north side of Canoe Rocks. The Emperor sank within 30 minutes, killing twelve crewmembers. |
| 7 | GEORGE M. COX | GEORGE M. COX | June 14, 1984 (#84001749) | Near Rock of Ages Light; 47°51′28″N 89°19′32″W | Isle Royale National Park | The Cox was launched in 1901 as the USS Puritan, a civilian transport ship. It was used by the US Navy in World War I, but returned to civilian service afterward. It sank in 1933 near the Rock of Ages Light off Isle Royale in Lake Superior. |
| 8 | GLENLYON | GLENLYON | June 14, 1984 (#84001750) | Glenlyon Shoals off Menagerie Island in Siskiwit Bay; 47°57′08″N 88°44′53″W | Isle Royale National Park | The Glenlyon was a freighter built in 1893. Over its career, it was owned by many companies, and hauled both package freight and bulk cargo, as well as, for a short time, passengers for both U.S. and Canada. The ship ran aground on November 1, 1924, while heading for shelter in Siskiwit Bay. |
| 9 | HENRY CHISHOLM | HENRY CHISHOLM | June 14, 1984 (#84001752) | Near Rock of Ages Light; 47°51′28″N 89°19′32″W | Isle Royale National Park | The Henry Chisholm was a wooden freighter built in 1880, and was the largest wooden "steam barge" ever built in Cleveland, approaching the practical size limit for a wooden vessel of its type. In October 1898, the Chisholm left Duluth, Minnesota, towing the 220-foot schooner John Martin. A storm blew up and the Martin was cast off. After the gale lessened, the Chisholm spent the next few days searching for the Martin, and struck a reef near the Rock of Ages Light while attempting to enter Washington Harbor. Portions of the Chisholm's hull are intermingled with the wreckage of the SS Cumberland, which had sunk earlier in 1877. |
| 10 | Ishpeming Fire Tower | Ishpeming Fire Tower | January 5, 2021 (#100006001) | Greenstone Ridge Trail; 47°59′39″N 88°54′55″W | Isle Royale National Park | Ishpeming Fire Tower is a ten-foot high tower constructed in 1961. It is part of the Isle Royale National Park Fire Towers MPS. |
| 11 | Isle Royale Light Station | Isle Royale Light Station | August 4, 1983 (#83000880) | Managerie Island; 47°56′29″N 88°46′01″W | Isle Royale | The Isle Royale Light (also called the Menagerie Island Light) is located on Managerie Island, at the opening of Siskiwit Bay near the southern shore of Isle Royale in Lake Superior. It was constructed in 1875. Part of the U.S. Coast Guard Lighthouses and Light Stations on the Great Lakes TR. |
| 12 | Johns Hotel | Johns Hotel | August 8, 1997 (#97000877) | Washington Harbor, on Barnum Island; 47°52′43″N 89°13′58″W | Isle Royale National Park | The Johns Hotel was established in 1892, and was the first summer resort on Isle Royale. There were once 16 buildings on the site, of which two, the main hotel and one cabin, remain. |
| 13 | KAMLOOPS | KAMLOOPS | June 14, 1984 (#84001769) | Kamloops Point; 48°05′06″N 88°45′53″W | Isle Royale National Park | The SS Kamloops was a lake freighter that was part of the fleet of Canada Steamship Lines from its launching in 1924 until it sank with all hands off Isle Royale in Lake Superior on or about 7 December 1927. |
| 14 | Minong | Minong | January 24, 2019 (#100003341) | Isle Royale National Park; 48°00′00″N 88°55′00″W | Isle Royale National Park | The Minong Traditional Cultural Property recognizes the lasting relationship the Grand Portage Band of Minnesota Chippewa has with Isle Royale. "Minong" is the Ojibwe name for Isle Royale. |
| 15 | Minong Mine Historic District | Minong Mine Historic District | November 11, 1977 (#77000153) | West of McCargoe Cove campground 48°04′58″N 88°43′35″W | Isle Royale National Park | The Minong Mine site contains prehistoric copper mining pits, thought to be as old as 4500 years. In addition, the site contains the remains of the Minong Mine, a 19th century copper mine that produced 249 tons of copper over its ten years of existence. |
| 16 | MONARCH | MONARCH | June 14, 1984 (#84001779) | Palisade area on the north side of Blake Point; 48°11′20″N 88°26′03″W | Isle Royale National Park | The Monarch was a passenger-package freighter built in 1890. In December 1906, the departed Thunder Bay for Sarnia in a blinding snowstorm. For some reason, the ship headed off its planned course, and that night it rammed at full speed into the palisade area on the north side of Blake Point on Isle Royale. Miraculously, all but one of the crew and passengers were able to make it to shore. |
| 17 | New Feldtmann Fire Tower | New Feldtmann Fire Tower | January 5, 2021 (#100006000) | Feldtmann Ridge Trail; 47°51′40″N 89°05′35″W | Isle Royale National Park | The New Feldtmann Fire Tower is a 41-foot tall fire tower constructed in 1964. It is part of the Isle Royale National Park Fire Towers MPS. |
| 18 | Ojibway Fire Tower | Ojibway Fire Tower | April 6, 2021 (#100006363) | Jct. of Greenstone Ridge and Mt. Ojibway Trails; 48°06′31″N 88°36′26″W | Isle Royale National Park | The Ojibway Fire Tower is part of the Isle Royale National Park Fire Towers MPS. |
| 19 | Passage Island Light Station | Passage Island Light Station | July 19, 2006 (#06000632) | Southwestern end of Passage Island, 3.25 mi (5.23 km) northeast of Isle Royale in northwestern Lake Superior; 48°13′27″N 88°21′57″W | Houghton Township | The Passage Island Light Station is a lighthouse located 3.25 miles (5.23 km) northeast of Isle Royale, in Lake Superior. It was constructed in 1882. Part of the Light Stations of the United States Multiple Property Submission (MPS). |
| 20 | Rock Harbor Lighthouse | Rock Harbor Lighthouse | March 8, 1977 (#77000154) | Rock Harbor; 48°05′21″N 88°34′45″W | Isle Royale National Park | The Rock Harbor Lighthouse is located in Rock Harbor on Isle Royale in Lake Superior. It was built in 1855/56, but permanently extinguished in 1879. |
| 21 | Rock of Ages Light Station | Rock of Ages Light Station | August 4, 1983 (#83000881) | Southwest of Isle Royale; 47°51′34″N 89°19′30″W | Isle Royale | The Rock of Ages Light is an active lighthouse on a small rock outcropping approximately 5 mi (8.0 km) west of Isle Royale in Lake Superior. It was constructed in 1908. Part of the U.S. Coast Guard Lighthouses and Light Stations on the Great Lakes TR. |
| 22 | Tobin Harbor Historic District | Tobin Harbor Historic District | August 5, 2019 (#100004256) | NE of Rack Harbor; 48°09′45″N 88°27′42″W | Isle Royale National Park | |

== See also ==
- National Register of Historic Places listings in Keweenaw County, Michigan
- National Register of Historic Places listings in Michigan
