= National Register of Historic Places listings in Keweenaw County, Michigan =

The following is a list of Registered Historic Places in Keweenaw County, Michigan.

This National Park Service list is complete through NPS recent listings posted October 30, 2026.

== Early history ==
Copper was discovered in the Keweenaw in the 1830s; soon after, the US government built Fort Wilkins near Copper Harbor to maintain order in the area. Keweenaw County was split off from Houghton County in 1861, with the county seat in Eagle River. The early government and commercial buildings in Eagle River are now a Historic District. Isle Royale, although split off into its own county in 1875, was reunited with Keweenaw County ten years later, and remains part of the county.

== Mining ==
Like Houghton County to the south, Keweenaw County's history includes much reference to copper mining. In particular, one of the earliest mines in the area, the prehistoric Minong Mine on Isle Royale, is listed as a historic district. In addition, the Central Mine and its Methodist Church are also listed on the historic register.

== Shipping and transportation ==
However, with the greatest Great Lake, Lake Superior, surrounding the peninsula, and multiple natural harbors, Keweenaw County's history is much more entwined in shipping and transportation. Nineteen of the properties listed—over half—were directly related to Great Lakes shipping. These include nine lighthouses in Lake Superior: Copper Harbor Light, Eagle Harbor Light, Gull Rock Light Station, Isle Royale Light, Manitou Island Light Station, Passage Island Light, Rock Harbor Light, Rock of Ages Light, and Sand Hills Light. In addition, the wrecks of ten ships around Isle Royale are on the Register: The SS Algoma, SS America, SS Chester A. Congdon, PS Cumberland, SS Emperor, George M. Cox, SS Glenlyon, SS Henry Chisholm, SS Kamloops, and the SS Monarch.

In addition, the listings contain three road bridges built in the 1930s: the M-26–Cedar Creek Culvert, the M-26–Silver River Culvert, and the US 41–Fanny Hooe Creek Bridge. Finally, the Houghton County Traction Company Ahmeek Streetcar Station, an interurban rail station, represents local transportation in the Keweenaw.

== Tourism ==
As the mining industry in the Keweenaw ran down, tourism in the area increased. This was evidenced by the increase in passenger ships (notably the SS America, mentioned above) and the construction of tourist hotels and summer cottages such as the Johns Hotel, the first resort on Isle Royale, and the Keweenaw Mountain Lodge and Golf Course Complex, built in 1933–34. Also in the 1930s, the roads accessing the Keweenaw communities were improved, with the addition of bridges such as the US 41–Fanny Hooe Creek Bridge.

== Listings ==
	Name on the Register	Image	Date listed	Location	City or town	Description
1	Algoma	Algoma	June 14, 1984 (#84001699)	Southeast shore of Mott Island; 48°06′41″N 88°31′55″W	Isle Royale National Park	The Algoma was a passenger steamer built in 1883. In November 1885, it ran into a blinding snowstorm, veered off course, and ran aground near Isle Royale. As the storm continued to rage, the ship came apart, eventually killing 46 people. The wreck of the Algoma was the worst loss of life in the history of Lake Superior shipping. Part of the Shipwrecks of Isle Royale National Park Thematic Resource (TR).
2	America	America	June 14, 1984 (#84001708)	North Gap of Washington Harbor; 47°53′39″N 89°13′15″W	Isle Royale National Park	The America served as a communications link for the communities of western Lake Superior in the early 20th century. Beginning in 1902, she ran three voyages per week among Duluth, Minnesota, Isle Royale, and Thunder Bay, Ontario, as well as numerous small communities in between. In June 1928, the America ran aground while leaving Washington Harbor, and efforts to salvage her were unsuccessful. The ship can be seen from the surface, with her bow in only two feet of water. Part of the Shipwrecks of Isle Royale National Park TR.
3	Brockway Mountain Drive	Brockway Mountain Drive	July 24, 2017 (#100001345)	Entire length of Brockway Mountain Drive; 47°27′51″N 87°58′09″W	Eagle Harbor Township	Brockway Mountain Drive is an 8.883-mile (14.296 km) scenic roadway. It was constructed by the county road commission with funding through Depression-era work programs in 1933.
4	Central Mine Historic District	Central Mine Historic District	June 28, 1974 (#74000991)	US 41; 47°24′21″N 88°11′58″W	Central	Central Mine was an active copper mine between 1856 and 1898, and over this span the company built 130 structures for use by the mine and its workers. Around 20 structures, mostly houses, remain.
5	Central Mine Methodist Church	Central Mine Methodist Church	October 15, 1970 (#70000278)	Old Stage Rd. 47°24′25″N 88°12′13″W	Central	This church, completed in 1869, was an important community center for the mining town of Central. After the mine closed in 1898, ex-residents and their descendants held an annual reunion at the church that continues into the 21st century.
6	Chester A. Congdon	Chester A. Congdon	June 14, 1984 (#84001716)	Congdon Shoals on northeast end of Isle Royale; 48°11′36″N 88°30′52″W	Isle Royale National Park	Originally named the Salt Lake City, when constructed in 1907, the bulk steel freighter sank near Isle Royale in Lake Superior in 1918. It was the first wreck in Lake Superior to be valued at over one million dollars. Part of the Shipwrecks of Isle Royale National Park TR.
7	Church of the Assumption	Church of the Assumption	March 15, 2000 (#00000220)	US 41, east of M-26; 47°23′22″N 88°16′34″W	Houghton Township	Built in 1858 in Cliff as St. Mary's Catholic Church, in 1899 the church was dismantled and reconstructed in its present location in Phoenix. Masses were held in the church until 1957. The church is also known as the Phoenix Church.
8	Copper Harbor Light Station	Copper Harbor Light Station	June 7, 2012 (#12000305)	9879 Woodland Rd. 47°28′28″N 87°51′37″W	Grant Township	The first Copper Harbor lighthouse and keeper's quarters were constructed in 1848. In 1866, the lighthouse was dismantled and the masonry used to construct a new tower. The light was deactivated in 1933, with the light being placed on an adjacent steel tower. The lighthouse currently serves as a museum.
9	Cumberland	Cumberland	June 14, 1984 (#84001732)	Near Rock of Ages Light; 47°51′28″N 89°19′32″W	Isle Royale National Park	The Cumberland was a wooden-hulled side paddlewheeler built in 1871. In July 1877, she began taking on water after leaving Thunder Bay, and struck a reef near the Rock of Ages Light. The day was clear and dry, and passengers and crew were removed without difficulty. The wreckage of the Cumberland is intermingled with some portions of the hull of the Henry Chisholm, which sank later in 1898. Part of the Shipwrecks of Isle Royale National Park TR.
10	Eagle Harbor Coast Guard Station Boathouse	Eagle Harbor Coast Guard Station Boathouse	August 16, 2012 (#12000306)	9282 Marina Rd. 47°27′32″N 88°08′58″W	Eagle Harbor	This boathouse is the only structure remaining on the site from a lifesaving station built in 1910-12. The structure currently houses a Life-Saving Station Museum.
11	Eagle Harbor Light Station	Eagle Harbor Light Station	July 19, 1984 (#84001745)	Eagle Harbor; 47°27′36″N 88°09′33″W	Eagle Harbor	The original Eagle Harbor Light was built in 1851. The current structure with octagonal tower and associated keeper's house was built in 1871. In 1999 ownership was transferred to the Keweenaw County Historical Society, although the Coast Guard still operates the light. Part of the U.S. Coast Guard Lighthouses and Light Stations on the Great Lakes TR.
12	Eagle Harbor Schoolhouse	Eagle Harbor Schoolhouse	September 22, 1972 (#72000628)	Third and Center; 47°27′24″N 88°09′46″W	Eagle Harbor	The Eagle Harbor Schoolhouse was the location where Justus H. Rathbone was first inspired to write the ritual which was the basis of the Order of the Knights of Pythias.
13	Eagle River Historic District	Eagle River Historic District	September 13, 1984 (#84001746)	Roughly Front, 2nd, 3rd, 4th, 5th, and Main Sts. 47°24′48″N 88°17′48″W	Eagle River	The community of Eagle River was founded in 1843. The District includes most of the remaining structures dating from the early settlement of the community, including industrial plants, county buildings, commercial buildings, and private residences.
14	Edisen Fishery	Edisen Fishery	March 8, 1977 (#77000152)	Rock Harbor; 48°05′22″N 88°34′57″W	Isle Royale National Park	The Edisen Fishery is a collection of seven buildings making up a commercial fishery, constructed between 1895 and 1934 by local fishermen using easily available local materials and built using strictly functional designs.
15	Emperor	Emperor	June 14, 1984 (#84001748)	North side of Canoe Rocks, on the northeast end of Isle Royale; 48°12′02″N 88°29′30″W	Isle Royale National Park	The Emperor was a freighter constructed in 1910, and at 525 feet in length, it was the largest Canadian-built freighter ever built at the time of her launching. In June 1947, the Emperor left Thunder Bay, laden with 10,429 tons of iron ore. Her course was miscalculated, and the ship ran aground at 4:15 in the morning on the north side of Canoe Rocks. The Emperor sank within 30 minutes, killing twelve crewmembers. Part of the Shipwrecks of Isle Royale National Park TR.
16	Fort Wilkins	Fort Wilkins	July 8, 1970 (#70000279)	Fort Wilkins State Park; 47°28′26″N 87°52′05″W	Copper Harbor	The U.S. Army first occupied Fort Wilkins in 1844, help with local law enforcement and to keep the peace between miners and the local Ojibwas. The fort was abandoned in 1846, and reoccupied only temporarily from 1867-1870. It is now a Michigan state park.
17	George M. Cox	George M. Cox	June 14, 1984 (#84001749)	Near Rock of Ages Light; 47°51′28″N 89°19′32″W	Isle Royale National Park	The Cox was launched in 1901 as the USS Puritan, a civilian transport ship. It was used by the US Navy in World War I, but returned to civilian service afterward. It sank in 1933 near the Rock of Ages Light off Isle Royale in Lake Superior. Part of the Shipwrecks of Isle Royale National Park TR.
18	Glenlyon	Glenlyon	June 14, 1984 (#84001750)	Glenlyon Shoals off Menagerie Island in Siskiwit Bay; 47°57′08″N 88°44′53″W	Isle Royale National Park	The Glenlyon was a freighter built in 1893. Over its career, it was owned by many companies, and hauled both package freight and bulk cargo, as well as, for a short time, passengers for both U.S. and Canada. The ship ran aground on November 1, 1924, while heading for shelter in Siskiwit Bay. Part of the Shipwrecks of Isle Royale National Park TR.
19	Gull Rock Light Station	Gull Rock Light Station	July 19, 1984 (#84001751)	Gull Rock; 47°25′02″N 87°39′49″W	Copper Harbor	The Gull Rock Light Station is a lighthouse located on Gull Rock, just east of Manitou Island near Isle Royale in Lake Superior. The light was built in 1867, automated in 1913, and is still an active navigational aid. Part of the U.S. Coast Guard Lighthouses and Light Stations on the Great Lakes TR.
20	Henry Chisholm	Henry Chisholm	June 14, 1984 (#84001752)	Near Rock of Ages Light; 47°51′28″N 89°19′32″W	Isle Royale National Park	The Henry Chisholm was a wooden freighter built in 1880, and was the largest wooden "steam barge" ever built in Cleveland, approaching the practical size limit for a wooden vessel of its type. In October 1898, the Chisholm left Duluth, Minnesota, towing the 220-foot schooner John Martin. A storm blew up and the Martin was cast off. After the gale lessened, the Chisholm spent the next few days searching for the Martin, and struck a reef near the Rock of Ages Light while attempting to enter Washington Harbor. Portions of the Chisholm's hull are intermingled with the wreckage of the SS Cumberland, which had sunk earlier in 1877. Part of the Shipwrecks of Isle Royale National Park TR.
21	Holy Redeemer Church	Holy Redeemer Church	March 16, 1972 (#72000629)	Western end of Center St. 47°27′24″N 88°09′54″W	Eagle Harbor	Built in 1854, the church the oldest surviving Roman Catholic church in the Marquette Diocese. The church sat vacant for many years after the decline of the copper mining industry, but near the end of the 20th century was refurbished and used for summer services.
22	Houghton County Traction Company Ahmeek Streetcar Station	Houghton County Traction Company Ahmeek Streetcar Station	March 15, 2000 (#00000221)	US 41/M-26 and Hubbell St. 47°17′48″N 88°23′42″W	Ahmeek	The Houghton County Traction Company was started in 1900 as an interurban line in the Keweenaw Peninsula. By 1908 the line was extended to just north of Mohawk, with stops in communities such as Ahmeek along the way. The company folded in 1932.
23	Isle Royale Light Station	Isle Royale Light Station	August 4, 1983 (#83000880)	Managerie Island; 47°56′29″N 88°46′01″W	Isle Royale	The Isle Royale Light (also called the Menagerie Island Light) is located on Managerie Island, at the opening of Siskiwit Bay near the southern shore of Isle Royale in Lake Superior. It was constructed in 1875. Part of the U.S. Coast Guard Lighthouses and Light Stations on the Great Lakes TR.
24	Ishpeming Fire Tower	Ishpeming Fire Tower	January 5, 2021 (#100006001)	Greenstone Ridge Trail; 47°59′39″N 88°54′55″W	Isle Royale National Park	Ishpeming Fire Tower is a ten-foot high tower constructed in 1961. It is part of the Isle Royale National Park Fire Towers MPS.
25	Johns Hotel	Johns Hotel	August 8, 1997 (#97000877)	Washington Harbor, on Barnum Island; 47°52′43″N 89°13′58″W	Isle Royale National Park	The Johns Hotel was established in 1892, and was the first summer resort on Isle Royale. There were once 16 buildings on the site, of which two, the main hotel and one cabin, remain.
26	Kamloops	Kamloops	June 14, 1984 (#84001769)	Kamloops Point; 48°05′06″N 88°45′53″W	Isle Royale National Park	The SS Kamloops was a lake freighter that was part of the fleet of Canada Steamship Lines from its launching in 1924 until it sank with all hands off Isle Royale in Lake Superior on or about 7 December 1927. Part of the Shipwrecks of Isle Royale National Park TR.
27	Keweenaw Mountain Lodge and Golf Course Complex	Keweenaw Mountain Lodge and Golf Course Complex	June 18, 1980 (#80001878)	Southwest of Copper Harbor on US 41; 47°27′28″N 87°54′27″W	Copper Harbor	The lodge was built in 1933/34 using funding from the newly minted Civil Works Administration. Logs from the forest cleared on the property were used to build the structures in the complex.
28	M-26–Cedar Creek Culvert	M-26–Cedar Creek Culvert	December 17, 1999 (#99001526)	M-26 over Cedar Creek; 47°27′20″N 88°09′00″W	Eagle Harbor Township	The M 26-Cedar Creek Culvert is a highway bridge located on M-26 over Cedar Creek, built by the Keweenaw County Road Commission in 1930.
29	M-26–Silver River Culvert	M-26–Silver River Culvert	December 17, 1999 (#99001527)	M-26 over Silver River; 47°27′47″N 88°04′20″W	Eagle Harbor Township	The M 26-Silver River Culvert is a highway bridge located on M-26 over the Silver River, built by the Keweenaw County Road Commission in 1930.
30	Manitou Island Light Station	Manitou Island Light Station	July 19, 1984 (#84001773)	Manitou Island; 47°25′12″N 87°35′14″W	Copper Harbor	The Manitou Island Light Station is a lighthouse located on Manitou Island, off the tip of Michigan's Keweenaw Peninsula in Lake Superior. The station consists of a skeletal steel light tower with associated keeper's house, both built in 1861. Part of the U.S. Coast Guard Lighthouses and Light Stations on the Great Lakes TR.
31	Minong	Minong	January 24, 2019 (#100003341)	Isle Royale National Park; 48°00′00″N 88°55′00″W	Isle Royale National Park	The Minong Traditional Cultural Property recognizes the lasting relationship the Grand Portage Band of Minnesota Chippewa has with Isle Royale. "Minong" is the Ojibwe name for Isle Royale.
32	Minong Copper Mining Historic District	Minong Copper Mining Historic District	January 13, 2021 (#100006259)	West of McCargoe Cove campground 48°04′58″N 88°43′35″W	Isle Royale National Park	The Minong Mine site contains prehistoric copper mining pits, thought to be as old as 4500 years. In addition, the site contains the remains of the Minong Mine, a 19th century copper mine that produced 249 tons of copper over its ten years of existence.
33	Monarch	Monarch	June 14, 1984 (#84001779)	Palisade area on the north side of Blake Point; 48°11′20″N 88°26′03″W	Isle Royale National Park	The Monarch was a passenger-package freighter built in 1890. In December 1906, the departed Thunder Bay for Sarnia in a blinding snowstorm. For some reason, the ship headed off its planned course, and that night it rammed at full speed into the palisade area on the north side of Blake Point on Isle Roayale. Miraculously, all but one of the crew and passengers were able to make it to shore. Part of the Shipwrecks of Isle Royale National Park TR.
34	Ojibway Fire Tower	Ojibway Fire Tower	April 6, 2021 (#100006363)	Jct. of Greenstone Ridge and Mt. Ojibway Trails; 48°06′31″N 88°36′26″W	Isle Royale National Park	The Ojibway Fire Tower is part of the Isle Royale National Park Fire Towers MPS.
35	New Feldtmann Fire Tower	New Feldtmann Fire Tower	January 5, 2021 (#100006000)	Feldtmann Ridge Trail; 47°51′40″N 89°05′35″W	Isle Royale National Park	The New Feldtmann Fire Tower is a 41-foot tall fire tower constructed in 1964. It is part of the Isle Royale National Park Fire Towers MPS.
36	Passage Island Light Station	Passage Island Light Station	July 19, 2006 (#06000632)	Southwestern end of Passage Island, 3.25 mi (5.23 km) northeast of Isle Royale in northwestern Lake Superior; 48°13′27″N 88°21′57″W	Houghton Township	The Passage Island Light Station is a lighthouse located 3.25 miles (5.23 km) northeast of Isle Royale, in Lake Superior. It was constructed in 1882. Part of the Light Stations of the United States Multiple Property Submission (MPS).
37	Rock Harbor Lighthouse	Rock Harbor Lighthouse	March 8, 1977 (#77000154)	Rock Harbor; 48°05′21″N 88°34′45″W	Isle Royale National Park	The Rock Harbor Lighthouse is located in Rock Harbor on Isle Royale in Lake Superior. It was built in 1855/56, but permanently extinguished in 1879.
38	Rock of Ages Light Station	Rock of Ages Light Station	August 4, 1983 (#83000881)	Southwest of Isle Royale; 47°51′34″N 89°19′30″W	Isle Royale	The Rock of Ages Light is an active lighthouse on a small rock outcropping approximately 5 mi (8.0 km) west of Isle Royale in Lake Superior. It was constructed in 1908. Part of the U.S. Coast Guard Lighthouses and Light Stations on the Great Lakes TR.
39	Sand Hills Light Station	Sand Hills Light Station	July 27, 1994 (#94000746)	Five Mile Point Rd., north of Mohawk, Allouez Township; 47°23′29″N 88°22′00″W	Mohawk	Sand Hills is a formerly active lighthouse on the shore of Lake Superior. It was built in 1919 and decommissioned in 1954; the structure is now a bed and breakfast.
40	Tobin Harbor Historic District	Tobin Harbor Historic District	August 5, 2019 (#100004256)	NE of Rack Harbor; 48°09′45″N 88°27′42″W	Isle Royale National Park	
41	US 41–Fanny Hooe Creek Bridge	US 41–Fanny Hooe Creek Bridge	December 17, 1999 (#99001525)	US 41 over Fanny Hooe Creek; 47°28′01″N 87°52′18″W	Grant Township	The US 41 – Fanny Hooe Creek Bridge is a highway bridge located on US 41 over the Fanny Hooe Creek, adjacent to Fort Wilkins State Park. It was constructed by the Keweenaw County Road Commission in 1928. Part of the Highway Bridges of Michigan MPS.

== See also ==
- List of Michigan State Historic Sites in Keweenaw County
- List of National Historic Landmarks in Michigan
- National Register of Historic Places listings in Michigan
- Listings in neighboring counties: Houghton
