= List of Michigan State Historic Sites in Keweenaw County =

Location of Keweenaw County in Michigan

The following is a list of Michigan State Historic Sites in Keweenaw County, Michigan. Sites marked with a dagger (†) are also listed on the National Register of Historic Places in Keweenaw County, Michigan.

== Current listings ==
Name	Image	Location	City	Listing date
Central Mine	Cliff Mine Office	US 41, 3.5 miles (5.6 km) east of Phoenix	Central	February 19, 1958
Central Mine Historic District†		Keweenaw Point on US 41, 3.5 miles (5.6 km) east of Phoenix	Central	November 15, 1973
Central Mine Methodist Church†		About 1 mile (1.6 km) north of US 41	Central	July 17, 1970
Copper Harbor Cemetery	Copper Harbor Cemetery	0.3 miles South on US 41 from Gratiot St.	Copper Harbor	January 8, 1981
Copper Harbor Lighthouse		Fort Wilkins State Park, S SE SW, 59 N, 28 W	Copper Harbor vicinity	February 22, 1974
Eagle Harbor House	Eagle Harbor House	HC1 Box 265B corner of Front Street and Center	Eagle Harbor	December 3, 1998
Eagle Harbor Schoolhouse†		Third and Center streets	Eagle Harbor	December 10, 1971
Eagle River Cemetery	Evergreen Cemetery-Eagle River	M-26	Eagle River vicinity	July 17, 1986
Edisen Fishery†		South side of Rock Harbor, near Middle Islands Passage, Isle Royale National Park		June 18, 1976
Fort Wilkins†		Fort Wilkins State Park	Copper Harbor vicinity	July 19, 1956
Holy Redeemer Church†		West end of Center Street	Eagle Harbor	February 19, 1958
Douglass Houghton Informational Designation		5059 Fourth Street	Eagle River	2016
Keweenaw County Courthouse Complex		Fourth Street (in public square)	Eagle River	November 3, 1976
Keweenaw Mountain Lodge and Golf Course Complex†		Southwest of Copper Harbor on US 41	Copper Harbor vicinity	June 18, 1976
Lake Shore Drive Bridge		Lake Shore Drive at the Eagle River	Eagle River	May 10, 1990
Rock Harbor Lighthouse†		South side of Rock Harbor, on south side of Middle Islands Passage, Isle Royale National Park		June 18, 1976

== See also ==
- National Register of Historic Places listings in Keweenaw County, Michigan

== Sources ==
- Historic Sites Online – Keweenaw County. Michigan State Housing Developmental Authority. Accessed January 23, 2011.
