= Eagle River Cemetery =

Historic site in Keweenaw County, Michigan

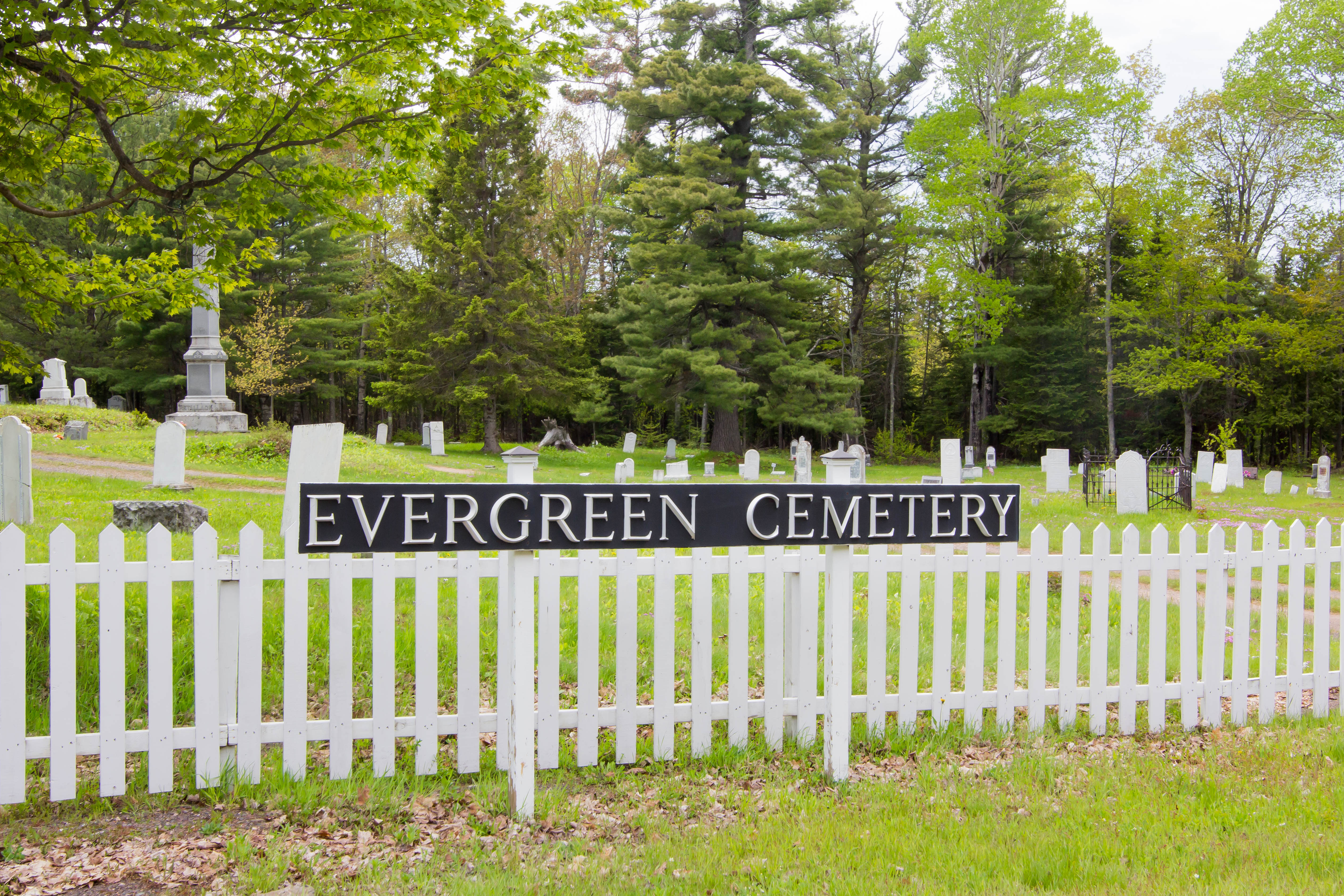

- Location within Michigan
- 47.406°N 88.299°W
- Location: M-26, near Eagle River

History
- Founded: 1843; 1876 (Official)

Site notes
- Area: 1 acre

Michigan State Historic Site
- Designated: July 17, 1986

The Eagle River Cemetery, also called the Evergreen Cemetery, is a cemetery located on highway M-26 about 0.5 miles (0.8 km) south of Eagle River, Michigan. It was listed as a Michigan State Historic Site on July 17, 1986, and is one of the oldest cemeteries in the Keweenaw Peninsula.

The cemetery holds 317 graves that date from 1843 through the present; 98 from the nineteenth century. However, the owner of the cemetery property, the Cliff Mining Company, did not officially set it aside until 1876.

== See also ==
- List of Michigan State Historic Sites in Keweenaw County, Michigan
