= Houghton Township =

Houghton Township may refer to the following places:

== Canada ==
- Houghton Township, Ontario

== United States ==
- Houghton Township, Michigan
