= Johns Hotel =

Historic hotel in Michigan, United States

- U.S. National Register of Historic Places
- U.S. Historic district
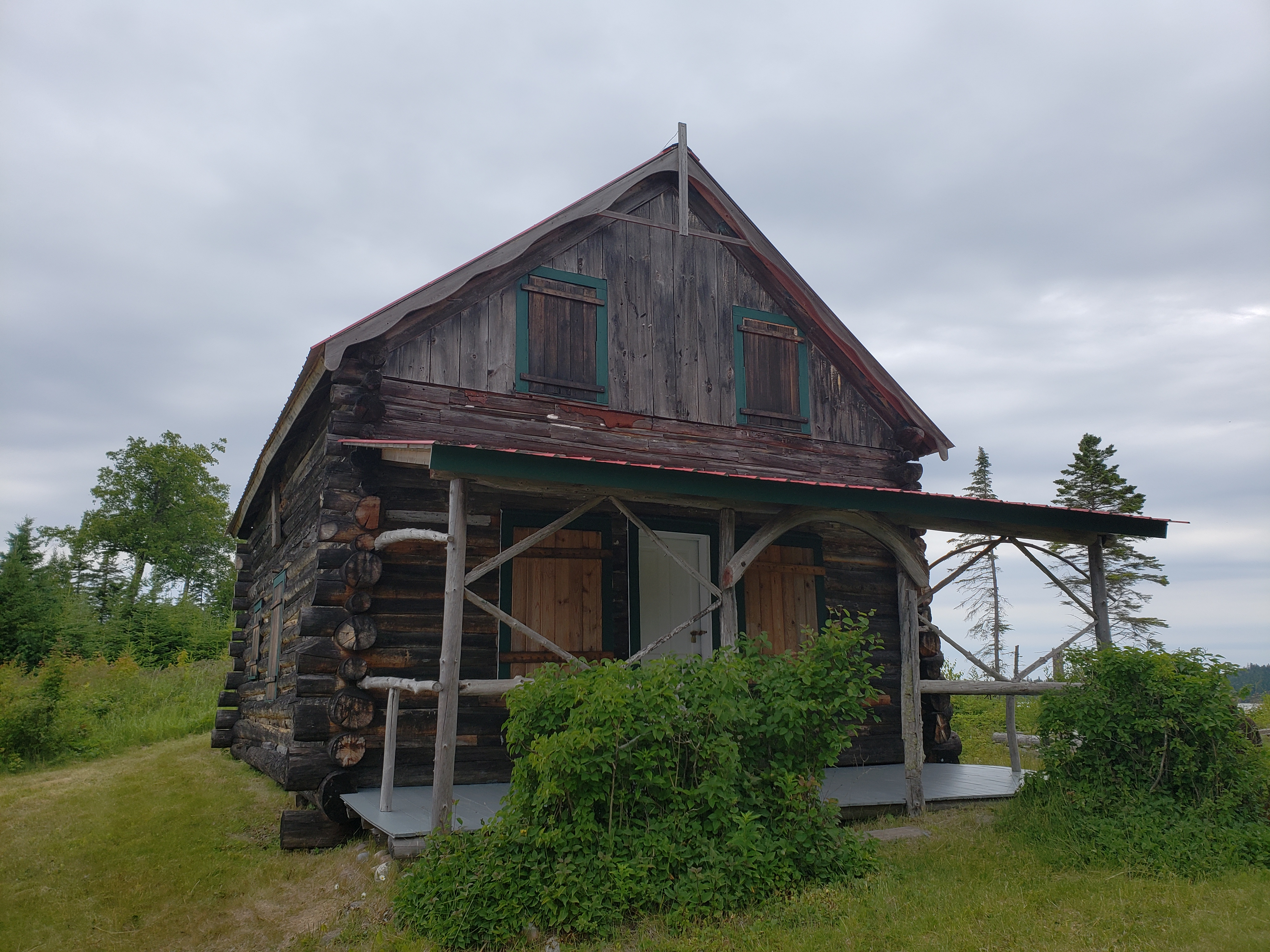
- Johns Hotel, 2018

- Location within Michigan Location within the United States
- Interactive map
- Location: Washington Harbor, on Barnum Island (originally Johns Island), Isle Royale National Park, Michigan
- Coordinates: 47°52′43″N 89°13′58″W
- Area: 1.5 acres (0.61 ha)
- Architect: Capt. John F. Johns, William T. Johns
- NRHP reference No.: 97000877
- Added to NRHP: August 08, 1997

The Johns Hotel (20IR64) is a complex of buildings, of which but two remain, located near Washington Harbor, on Barnum Island (originally Johns Island), Isle Royale National Park, Michigan. It was listed on the National Register of Historic Places in 1997.

== History ==
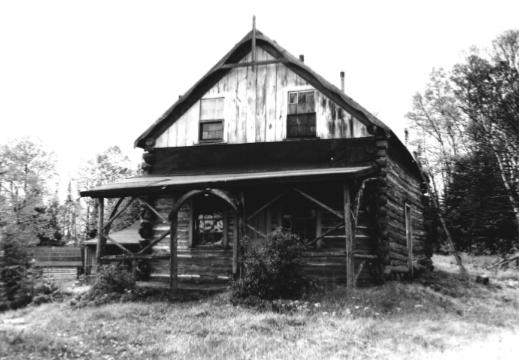
Johns Hotel, early 1900s

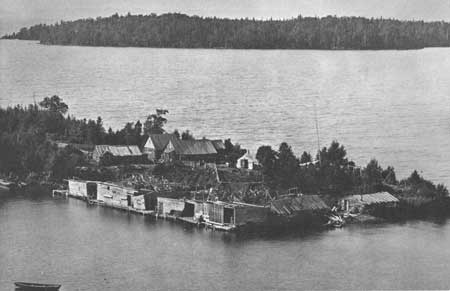
Barnums Island

Captain John F. Johns was originally a miner; he came to Isle Royale to work the Windigo Mine, and later the Minong Mine (in 1881–1883). When the Windigo failed, Johns turned to fishing to make a living, homesteading on some of the islands of Washington Harbor, including both Johns Island and Barnum Island where the hotel is now located.

In the late 19th century, there was an upsurge of interest in recreation in the Isle Royale area, leading some inhabitants to supplement their income by working as hunting or fishing guides. In 1892, Captain John F. Johns and his wife Catherine opened the Johns Hotel. The hotel was the first summer resort and first U.S. Postal Office on Isle Royale. In addition, the site served as the base for the Johns family's commercial fishing business. By 1902, there were 16 buildings on this site, including a hotel, dining room, store, barn, three fish houses, warehouse, five cottages of various sizes, root house, and two docks.

Duluth, Minnesota businessman George Barnum began vacationing at the Johns Hotel in the 1890s. Enamored of the area, he bought the island from the Johns family in 1902 and renamed it Barnum Island. Barnum turned the island into a private resort, inviting his friends to build cabins on the island.

== The site today ==
Two buildings, the hotel and one cottage, remain on the site; the remainder were either dismantled or burned, but some archaeological features remain. The main Johns Hotel is a 1 1/2-story structure built of round logs with cement chinking. It was originally a single story building; the upper portion was added later. It has six rooms and a gabled roof with vertical board gable ends, and six-light and six-over-six horizontal sliding windows. A single-story addition with shed roof is located to the rear. The cottage is a 1 1/2-story building built with round logs with cement chinking. It has a gabled roof with shingled gable ends, and 6-over-6 windows.

In partnership with the National Park Service and surviving members of the Johns Family, a full restoration of the Johns Hotel began in 1997 and continues today.

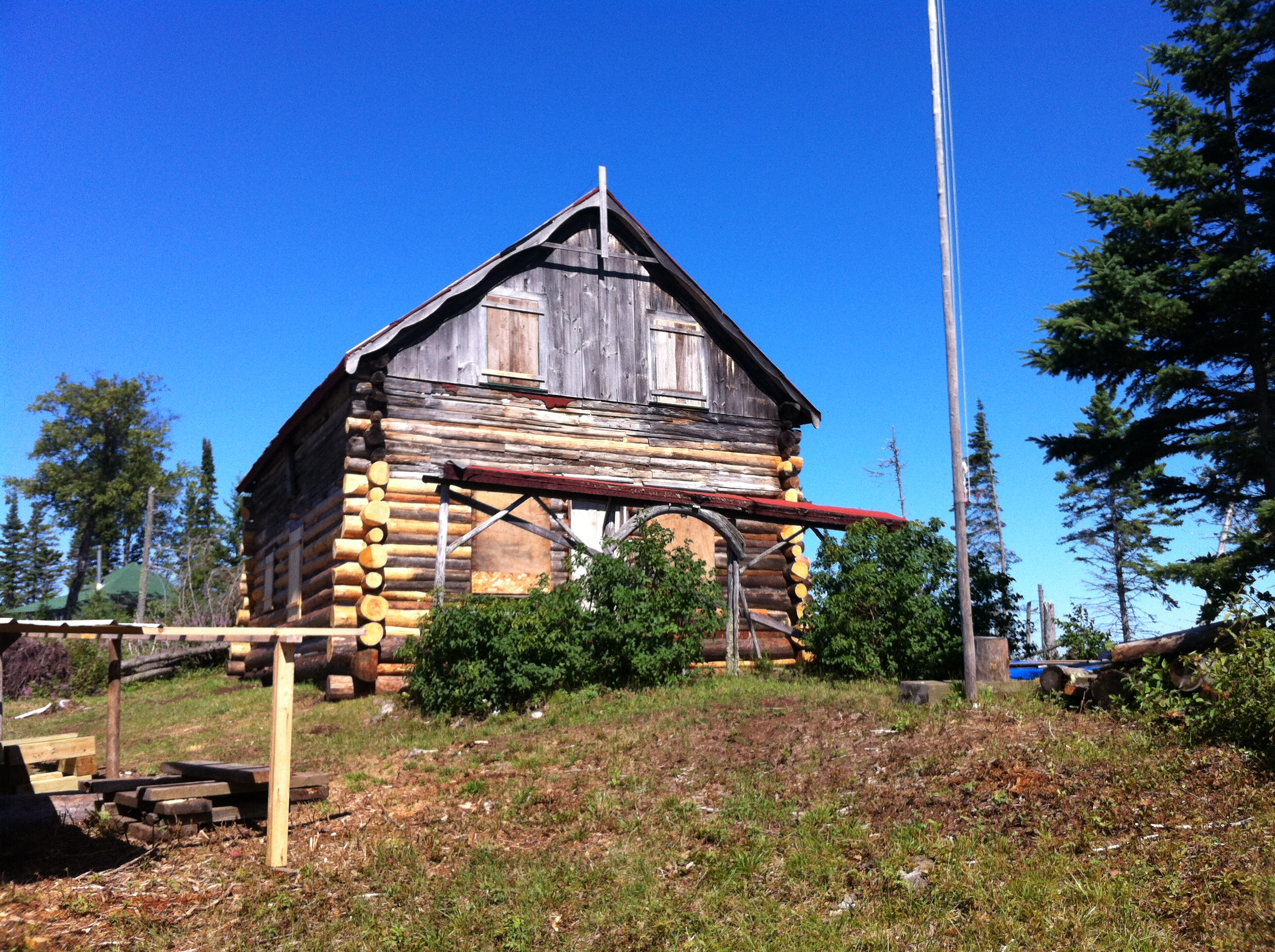
Johns Hotel, 2013
