= SS Monarch =

Passenger-package freighter that sank in Lake Superior

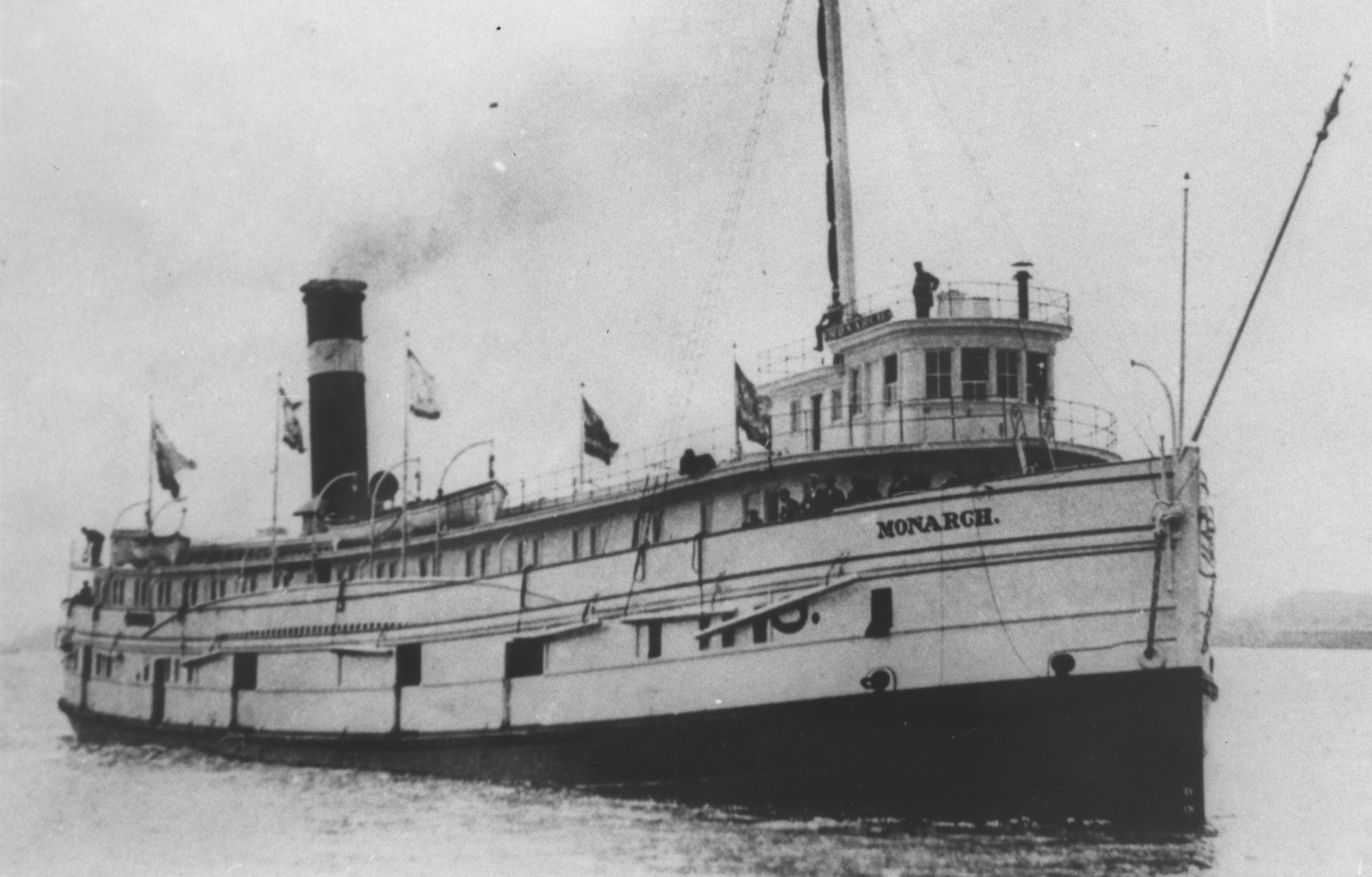
- The Monarch underway

History

Canada
- Name: Monarch
- Operator: Northern Navigation Company, Ltd
- Builder: John Dyble
- Launched: June 27, 1890
- Fate: Wrecked 6 December 1906

General characteristics
- Type: Passenger-package freighter
- Length: 259 ft (79 m)
- Beam: 35 feet
- Depth: 15 ft (4.6 m)
- Installed power: 900HP
- Propulsion: triple expansion steam engine
- Speed: 14 knots
- Notes: Official Number 96843
- MONARCH
- U.S. National Register of Historic Places
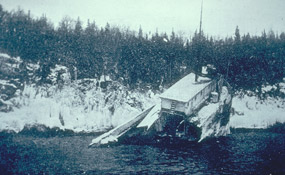
- Bow section of the Monarch

- Location within Michigan Location within the United States
- Location: Palisade area, north side of Blake Point, Isle Royale National Park, Michigan
- Coordinates: 48°11′20″N 88°26′3″W
- Area: 45.9 acres (18.6 ha)
- Built: 1890
- Architect: John Dyble
- Architectural style: Passenger-package freighter
- MPS: Shipwrecks of Isle Royale National Park TR
- NRHP reference No.: 84001779
- Added to NRHP: June 14, 1984

SS Monarch was a passenger-package freighter built in 1890 that operated on the Great Lakes. She was sunk off the shore of Isle Royale in Lake Superior in 1906 and the remains of her wreck and cargo are still on the lake bottom. The wreck was placed on the National Register of Historic Places in 1984.

== History ==
Monarch (Official Number 96843) was a wooden passenger-cargo ship built in 1890 in Sarnia, Ontario, Canada, by John Dyble for the Northwest Transportation Company. She was launched on June 27, 1890, the last ship built in Sarnia until World War II. The ship was 259 feet (79 meters) long, 35 feet (11 meters) in beam, and 15 feet (4.6 meters) in depth. She had a 900-hp (671-kW) triple-expansion steam engine with two Scotch boilers, allowing her to attain 14 mph. The ship's hull was heavily reinforced with iron, and she was fitted with 65 cabins.

Monarch was used to transport both passengers and packages on the Great Lakes throughout her career, primarily running between Sarnia, Thunder Bay, Ontario, and Duluth, Minnesota. In 1899, Northwest Transportation merged with another company to form the Northern Navigation Company, Ltd.

== Final voyage ==
On December 6, 1906, the Monarch finished loading a cargo of wheat, oats, salmon, and general merchandise and departed Thunder Bay for Sarnia in a blinding snowstorm. For some reason, the ship headed off her planned course, and that night she ran at full speed into the palisade area on the north side of Blake Point on Isle Royale. The ship's engineer kept the engine engaged to maintain the ship's position on the shore, and John D. McCallum, brother of first mate Burt McCallum, carried a line to shore through the rough seas. The crew and passengers used the line to escape the wreck, and only one person perished. The survivors camped on Isle Royale for four days, salvaging food from the wreck and keeping signal fires alight, before they were rescued on December 10, 1906.

During the night of 11–12 December 1906, the wreck broke into two pieces, leaving only the bow section visible. Salvage operations on Monarch were carried out over the next two years, and the engine and associated machinery was salvaged in 1908.

== The wreck today ==
The wooden wreck has disintegrated, although a number of pieces of wreckage can be seen. Large pieces of wooden wreckage are scattered on the bottom of Lake Superior at depths of 10 to 80 feet (3.0 to 24.4 meters), and there is a trove of Monarch′s cargo still lying on the bottom near the wreck. Approximately 85 dives were made on the wreck in 2009 out of 1,062 dives made to wrecks in the Isle Royale National Park.
