= SS Algoma =

Screw steamer sunk on Lake Superior

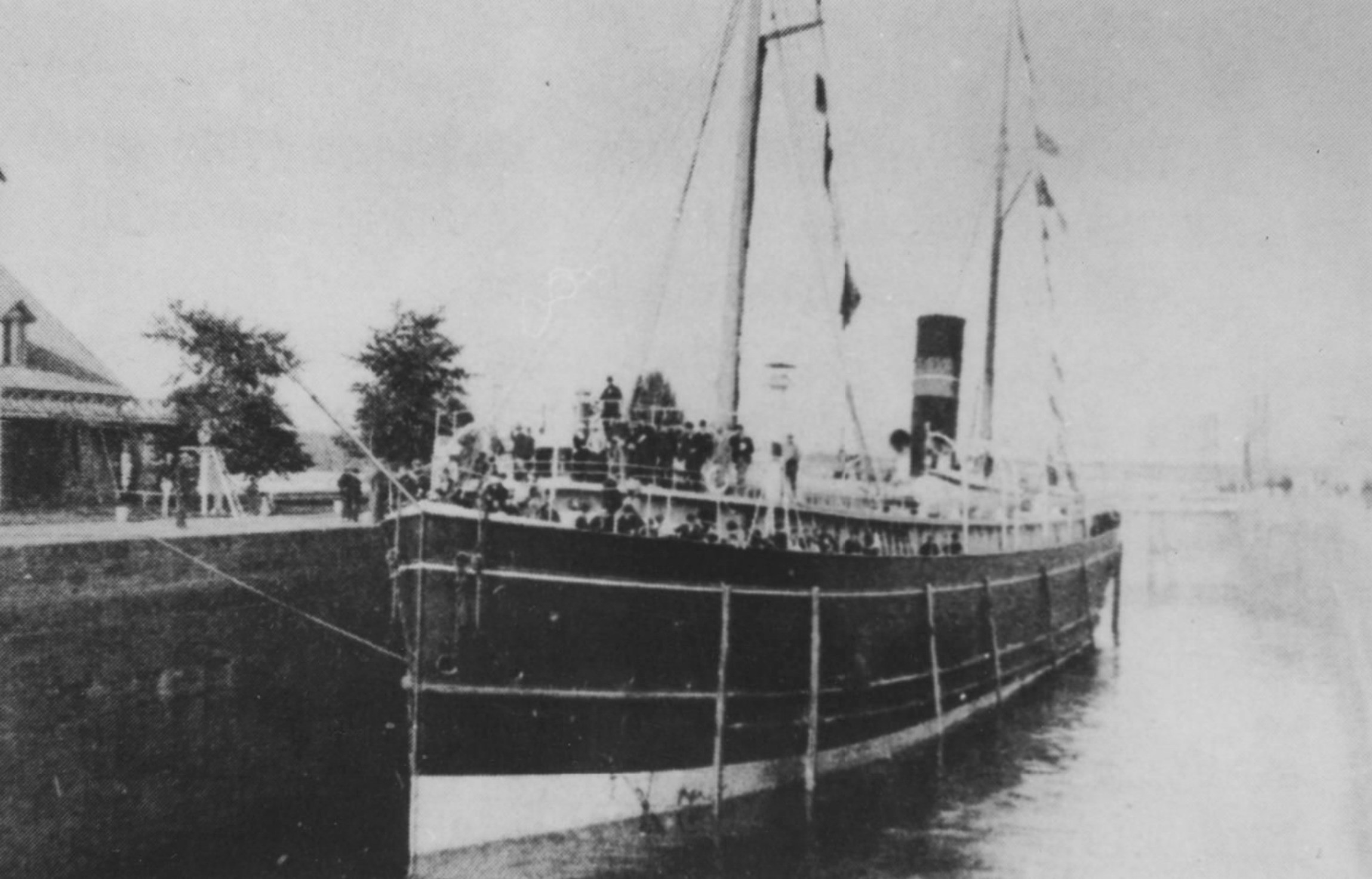

History

Canada
- Name: Algoma
- Operator: Canadian Pacific Railway Company
- Builder: Aitken & Mansell
- Launched: July 31, 1883
- Out of service: November 7, 1885
- Fate: Sank off the shore of Isle Royale in Lake Superior

General characteristics
- Type: Screw steamer
- Tonnage: 1,773 GRT
- Length: 262 ft (80 m)
- Beam: 38 ft (12 m)
- Depth: 23 ft (7 m)
- Notes: Official #85766
- Algoma
- U.S. National Register of Historic Places
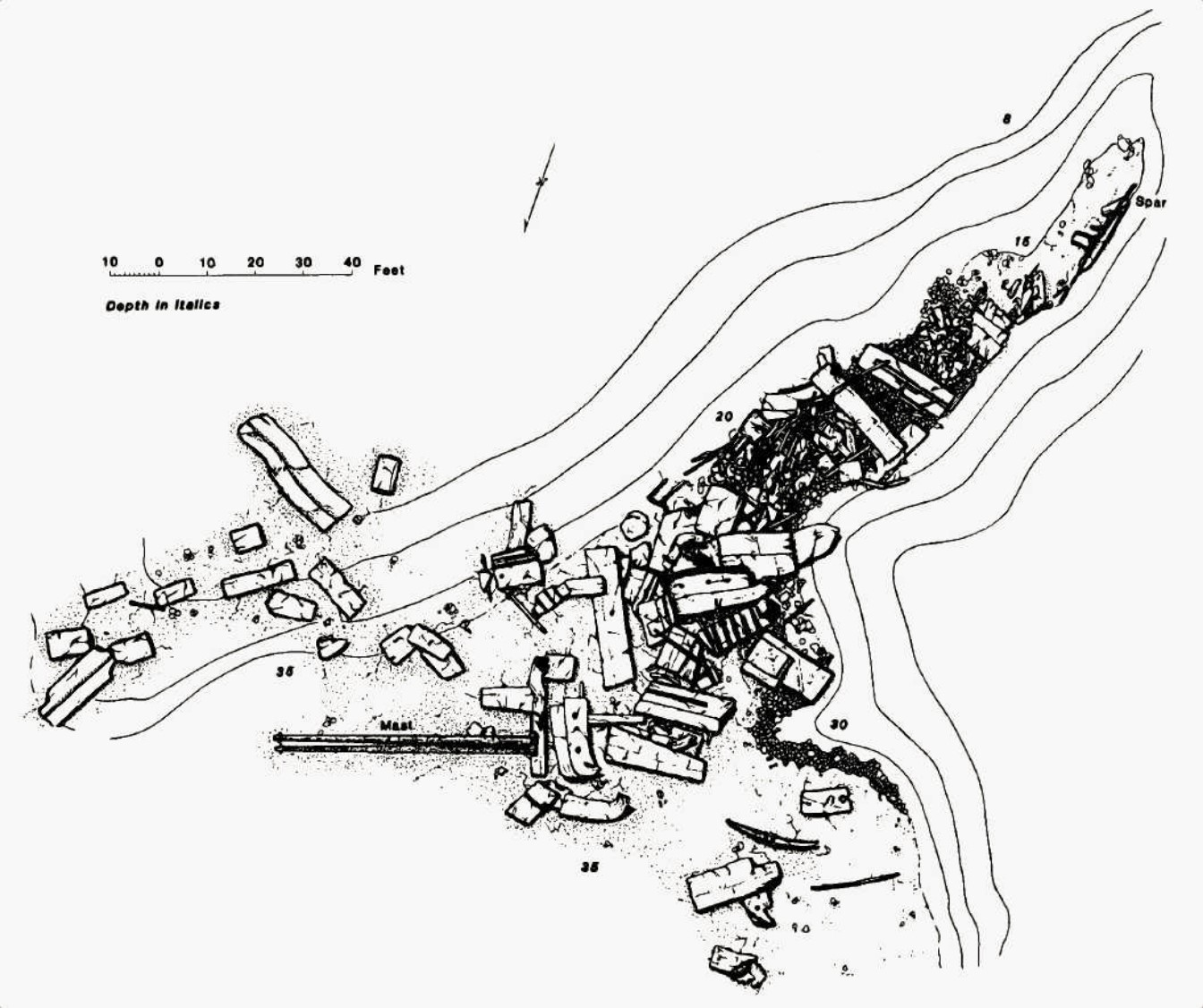
- Diagram of wreckage field

- Location within Michigan Location within the United States
- Location: Southeast shore of Mott Island, Isle Royale National Park, Michigan
- Coordinates: 48°6′41″N 88°31′55″W
- Area: 45.7 acres (18.5 ha)
- Built: 1883
- Architect: Aitken & Mansell
- Architectural style: Screw Steamer
- MPS: Shipwrecks of Isle Royale National Park TR
- NRHP reference No.: 84001699
- Added to NRHP: June 14, 1984

Algoma was a screw steamer built in 1883. She sank off Mott Island near Isle Royale in Lake Superior in 1885 and some of her remains are still on the lake bottom. The wreck was placed on the National Register of Historic Places in 1984.

== History ==
Algoma (Official #85766) was built in 1883 by Aitken & Mansell in Glasgow, Scotland, for use by the Canadian Pacific Railway Company. Algoma was 262 feet (80 m) long, with a 38-foot (12 m) beam, a depth of 23 feet (7 m), and had a gross register tonnage of 1,750 tons as originally built. It was powered by a compound steam engine driving a single screw, and had two masts in case of an engine breakdown. The ship was designed to accommodate 240 first-class passengers and 500 in steerage.

Canadian Pacific ordered three ships from Aitken & Mansell: Athabasca, launched on July 3, 1883; Alberta, launched on July 12, and Algoma, launched on July 31. The three ships were identical. The company intended to use the ship as a passenger vessel on the Great Lakes, running from Thunder Bay on Lake Superior to Owen Sound on Lake Huron. Alberta and Algoma sailed from Glasgow on September 25, taking 13 days to cross the Atlantic and arrive in Montreal, Quebec. However, ships of Algoma's size were too long to pass through the Welland Canal, so Algoma was cut in half, with the bow and stern moved through the canal separately on pontoons. The ship was rejoined in Buffalo, New York, and cabins were added, increasing the tonnage to 1,773 tons. Additional work was done on the cabins during the winter of 1883–1884, including the installation of electric lighting; Algoma and its sister ships were probably the first Great Lakes ships to be electrified. The newly outfitted Algoma, costing a total of $450,000 to build, was relaunched on May 11, 1884.

The three Canadian Pacific steamers immediately set time records for their runs. Algoma clocked 39 hours, 42 minutes on the run between Owen Sound and Thunder Bay, and journeyed from Toronto to Thunder Bay in the "unprecedented short time of 47 hours." There was some concern that the new steamers were disregarding safety to minimize their run times; indeed, Alberta was involved in a collision with the steam barge John M. Osborn in July 1884 near Whitefish Point which resulted in the loss of three lives.

== Wreck of Algoma ==
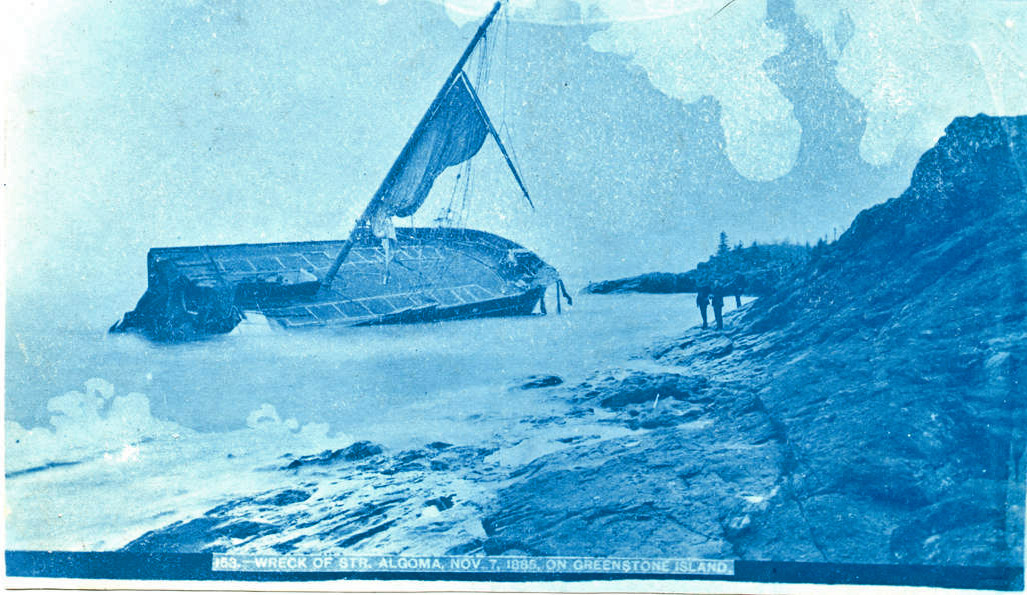
The wreck of Algoma

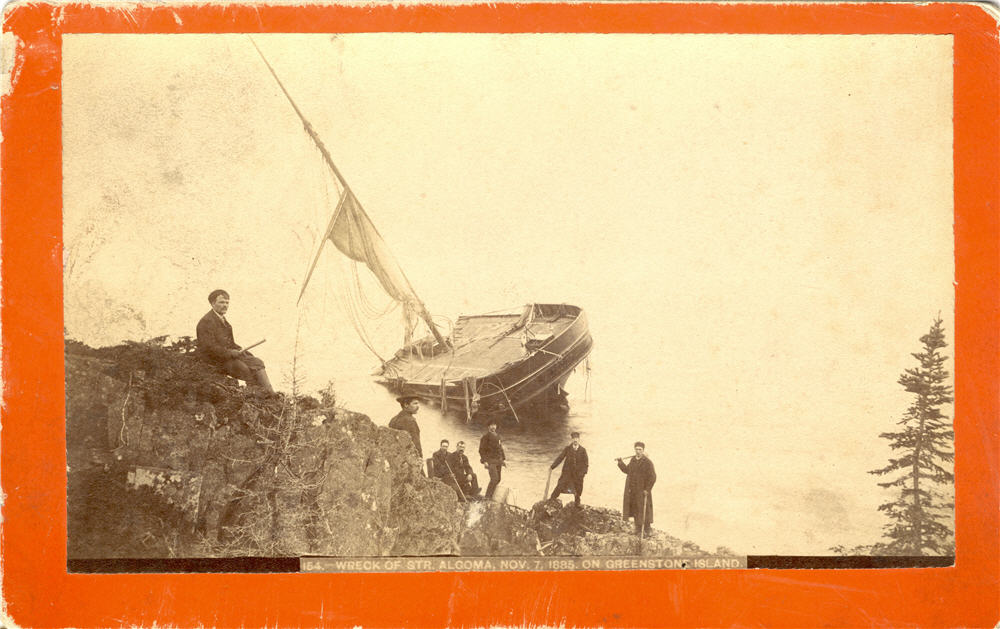
The Algoma wreck

On November 5, 1885, Algoma left Owen Sound for Thunder Bay, carrying general merchandise, railway supplies, and 37 passengers, the fewest it had ever carried. This was likely attributable to the lateness of the season and the recent opening of a rail route around Lake Superior. The ship passed into Lake Superior on November 6; when it was about halfway across the lake it ran into a blinding snowstorm. The sails were set to stabilize the ship, but it drifted off course. At about 4 am on the morning of November 7, the captain ordered the sails lowered and changed course. At 4:40 am, shortly after resuming steam power, Algoma ran aground on the southeast shore of Mott Island off Isle Royale.

The ship was grounded so that the waves pummeled the bow section. At about 6 am, the ship broke in two, with the stern grounded on the shore and the bow drifting off. Many of the passengers and crew were swept away, but three people made it to shore (only 50 feet, 15 m away) and another 11 remained in the bow section of the ship until the morning of November 8, when the storm abated. The survivors all got to shore on November 8, and stayed that night with a party of fishermen. On November 9, Athabasca was intercepted and the survivors were taken on to Thunder Bay.

Forty-six people died in the wreck of Algoma; there were 14 survivors, including two passengers, 11 crewmen and the captain. A search party returned to Isle Royale on November 10, but found only two bodies; more bodies and cargo were located in the subsequent months. The force of the storm was such that nearly all the cargo was smashed; only portions of some bodies were found as the waves had "dashed them to pieces against the rocks", and some hull sections were completely flattened.

The wreck of Algoma was the worst loss of life in the history of Lake Superior shipping.

Much of the stern of the ship was salvaged in 1886, and much of the bow was either salvaged or drifted away. The engine from the ship was used in the passenger steamer Manitoba, launched in 1889; Manitoba was used for 60 years on the Great Lakes before decommissioning. An additional salvage operation was carried out in 1903.

== The wreck today ==
The remaining wreckage is widely scattered in 15 to 100 feet (5 to 30 m) of water, and some portions of the stern are all that remain on the site. The wreckage near shore is primarily distributed in three fields, 100 feet apart. Various pieces of the ship's equipment, including pieces of a mast, pipes, valves, and davits are visible, as well as passenger artifacts. Much of the wreckage is in relatively shallow water, and lake action regularly rearranges the artifacts visible. A few pieces of wreckage have been located far offshore in deeper water; these may be from the missing bow section. Algoma is the least-visited wreck in the Isle Royale National Park, with approximately 10 dives in 2009 out of 1,062 dives made to wrecks in the park.
