= Keweenaw Mountain Lodge and Golf Course Complex =

Historic district in Michigan, United States

- U.S. National Register of Historic Places
- U.S. Historic district
- Michigan State Historic Site
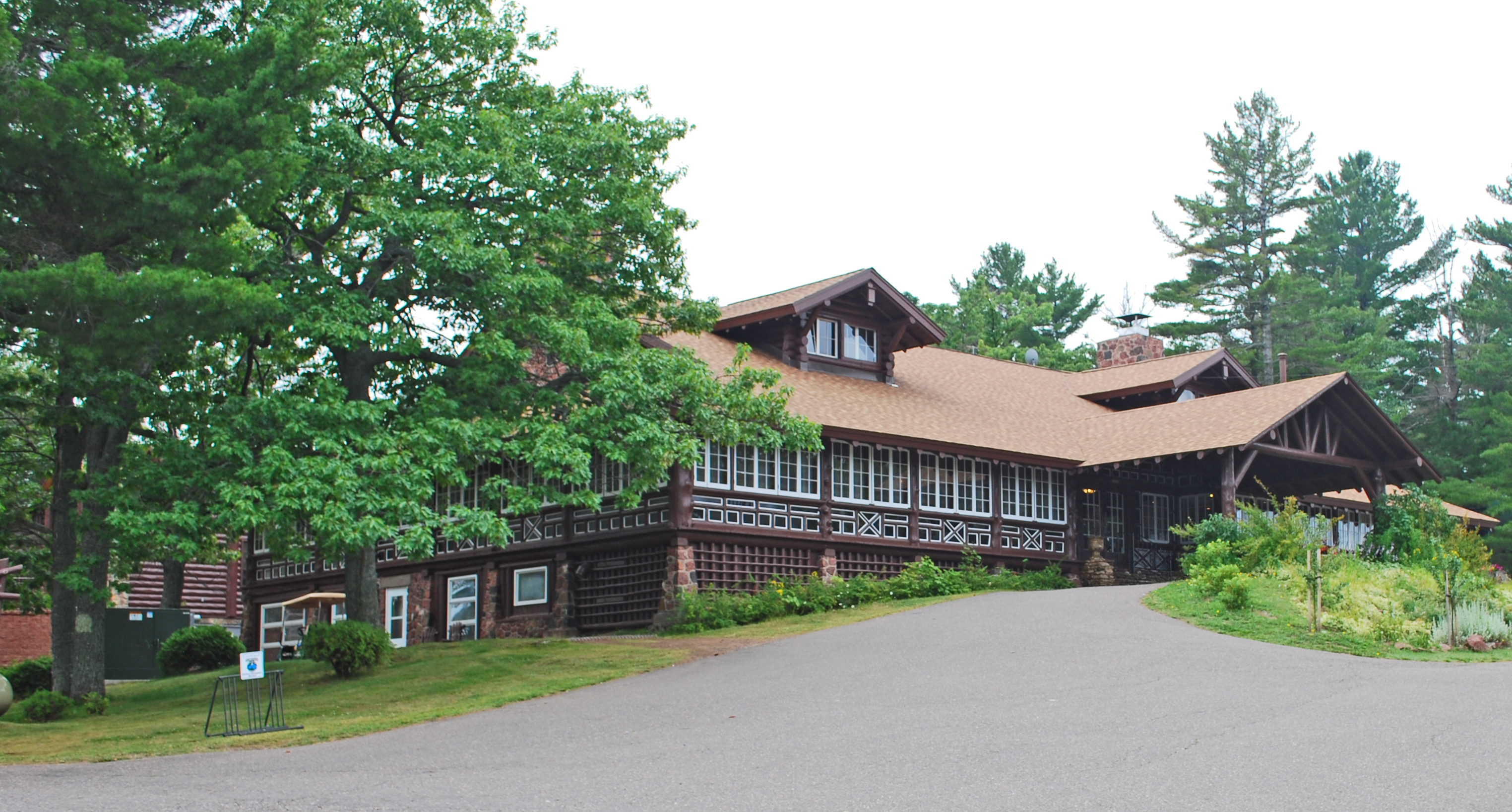
- Keweenaw Mountain Lodge

- Location within Michigan Location within the United States
- Interactive map
- Location: Grant Township, Keweenaw County, Michigan
- Nearest city: Copper Harbor, Michigan
- Coordinates: 47°27′33″N 87°54′36″W
- Built: 1934-1935
- Architect: WPA; Louis Azzi
- Architectural style: Late 19th and Early 20th Century American Movements, Shingle Style, Western Stick; Rustic
- NRHP reference No.: 80001878

Significant dates
- Added to NRHP: June 18, 1980
- Designated MSHS: June 18, 1976

The Keweenaw Mountain Lodge and Golf Course Complex is a resort located near Copper Harbor, Michigan. It was designated a Michigan State Historic Site in 1976 listed on the National Register of Historic Places in 1970, and open to the public.

== Description ==
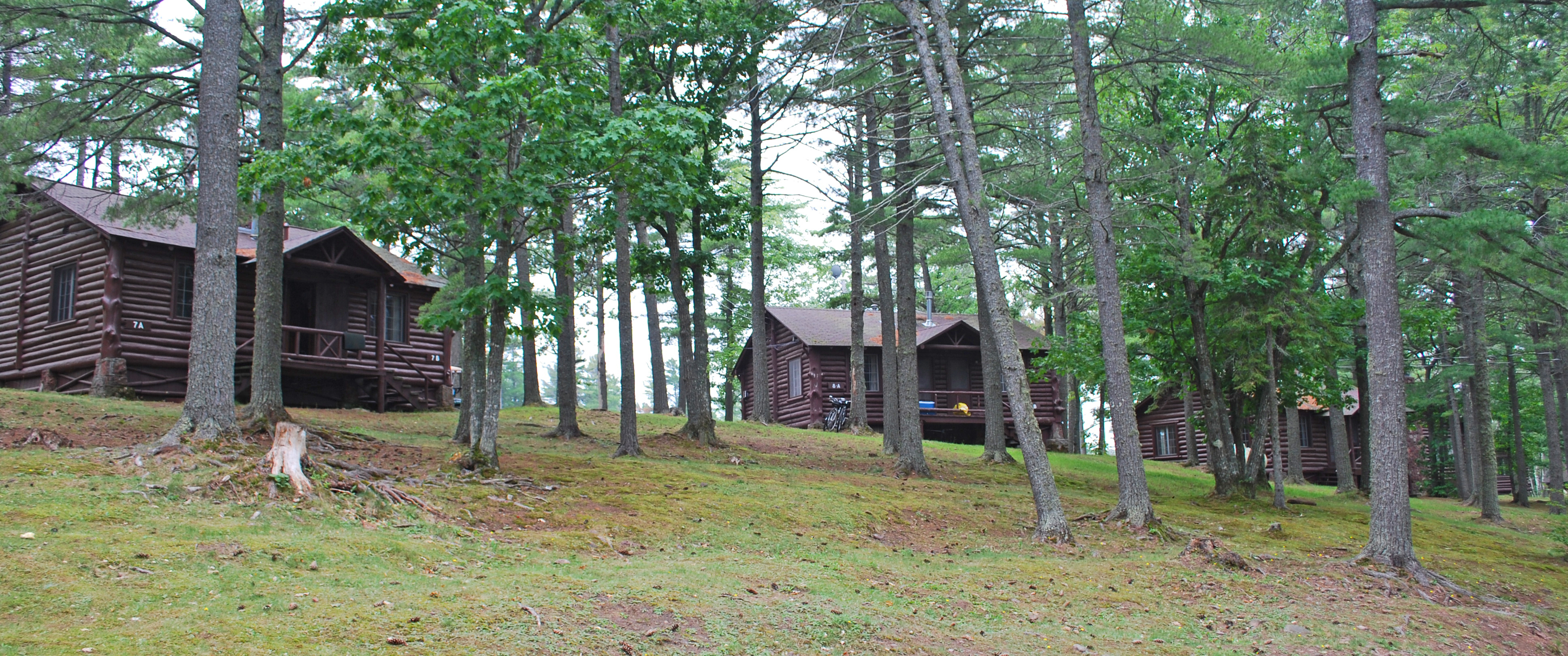
Cabins at the Lodge complex

The Keweenaw Mountain Lodge Complex covers 167 acres (68 ha), and consists of multiple buildings, including the main lodge and 23 cabins. A golf course, constructed at the same time as the lodge and cabins, covers much of the remaining land. The property also contains trails for hiking, mountain biking, and cross-country skiing. All structures within the district are unified by their rustic construction; the structures have low gable roofs and are made using rough-cut stone and dark painted logs.

== History ==
During the early 1930s, the Great Depression hit Keweenaw County hard. The mining industry had fallen on hard times, and unemployment stood at over seventy percent. Ocha Potter, the head of the Keweenaw County Road Commission and superintendent of Ahmeek Mine, conceived of constructing a resort complex in the county. In 1933, he applied to the federal government for funding under the newly created Civil Works Administration. The county Board of Park Trustees had previously negotiated purchase of 167 acres (68 ha) of land from the Keweenaw Copper Company, situated about one mile (1.6 km) south of Copper Harbor.

Clearing of the forest cover began in the winter of 1933/34, and the stumps were cleared as the weather let up. The logs from the property were used construct the lodge. By the end of 1934, the lodge was nearly completed and the first nine holes of the golf course were cleared and seeded. (A second planned nine holes was never completed.) In 1935, another project to build 20 cabins was approved by the Works Progress Administration, which were completed during the next few years. Four additional cottages were built in 1947/48 using profits from the operation of the lodge.

In July 2018, Keweenaw County auctioned off the lodge, selling it to John Lamb of Corpus Christi, Texas.

== Significance ==
The lodge complex was designed and built in 1934 and 1935, in the depths of the Great Depression, using crews of local workmen. The construction was overseen by Keweenaw County and used federal relief money. The site is an example of government-funded work projects designed to boost local economies, and is significant in its effort to protect and maintain the environment while offering recreational opportunity.
