= Ojibway Fire Tower =

- U.S. National Register of Historic Places
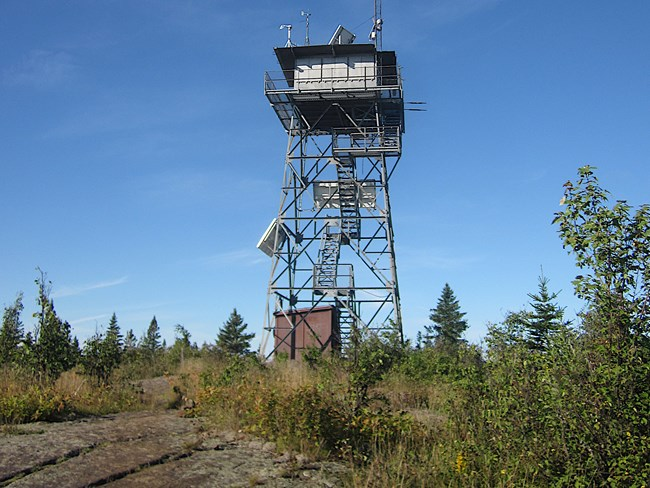

- Location within Michigan Location within the United States
- Interactive map
- Location: Jct. of Greenstone Ridge and Mt. Ojibway Trails, Isle Royale NP
- Coordinates: 48°06′31″N 88°36′26″W
- Built: 1964
- MPS: Isle Royale National Park Fire Towers MPS
- NRHP reference No.: 100006363
- Added to NRHP: April 6, 2021

The Ojibway Fire Tower is a fire tower located at the junction of Greenstone Ridge and Mt. Ojibway Trails in Isle Royale National Park. The tower was listed on the National Register of Historic Places in 2021.

== History ==
In 1936, soon after Isle Royale was designated a national park, the large Greenstone Ridge Fire swept through a portion of the island. In response, in 1939 the National Park Service constructed two fire towers on the island, one near what is now the New Feldtmann Fire Tower and one on Mount Ojibway. These towers were constructed of wood, and by the 1950s were badly deteriorating. Plans were in place by 1961 to replace them, but funds were not available until two years later. In 1963, the original Ojibway Fire Tower was torn down, and in 1964 construction began on a new tower. The tower was completed in 1965.

However, by 1968, the fire management strategies in the park had changes, and the tower was no longer staffed; instead, it was used to house the radio repeater station for the island. In 1987, NPS added equipment to monitor air pollution on Isle Royale.

== Description ==
The Ojibway Fire Tower is a variation on the US Forest Service's "Standard Steel Lookout Tower...with Living Quarters" design. At the top of the tower is a pre-fabricated cab measuring approximately 14 feet by 14 feet, The cab is constructed of metal panels and contains windows on all four sides. A metal balcony surrounds the cab, and is accessed by a ladder from below.
