= SS Kamloops =

Lake freighter of Canada Steamship Lines

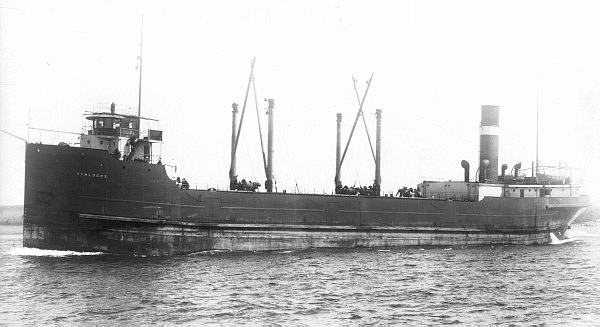
- SS Kamloops in 1925

History

Canada
- Name: Kamloops
- Operator: Canada Steamship Lines, Ltd., Montreal, Quebec, Canada
- Builder: Furness Ship Building Company, Ltd., Stockton-on-Tees, Durham, England, UK
- Yard number: 68
- Completed: 1924
- Fate: Foundered off Isle Royale in western Lake Superior 7 December 1927
- Notes: Canada Registry #147682

General characteristics
- Class & type: Package freighter – canaller
- Tonnage: 2402 gross; 1748 net
- Length: 250 ft (76 m)
- Beam: 43 ft (13 m)
- Height: 24 ft (7.3 m)
- Propulsion: triple expansion steam
- Crew: 22
- KAMLOOPS
- U.S. National Register of Historic Places
- Location within Michigan Location within the United States
- Location: Kamloops Point, Isle Royale National Park, Michigan, U.S.
- Coordinates: 48°5′6″N 88°45′53″W
- Area: 45.9 acres (18.6 ha)
- Built: 1924
- Architect: Furness Shipbuilding Company, Ltd.
- Architectural style: Freighter
- MPS: Shipwrecks of Isle Royale National Park TR
- NRHP reference No.: 84001769
- Added to NRHP: 14 June 1984

SS Kamloops was a Canadian lake freighter that was part of the fleet of Canada Steamship Lines from its launching in 1924 until it sank with all hands in Lake Superior off Isle Royale, Michigan, United States, on or about 7 December 1927.

== The canaller ==
The steamship Kamloops was built by Furness Shipbuilding Co. Ltd. in Haverton Hill, Stockton-on-Tees, Durham, England, United Kingdom, for Steamships Ltd. of Montreal, Quebec, Canada. With a length of only 250 feet (75 m) and rated at 2,402 gross tons, Kamloops was a relatively small vessel for the Great Lakes in the 1920s. She was built to fit inside the locks of the Canadian-operated canals of the lower Great Lakes and St. Lawrence River during the years prior to the construction of the St. Lawrence Seaway. The ship had two rigged masts and a 1000HP triple expansion steam engine with Scotch boilers.

Kamloops completed its sea testing on 5 July 1924, was shipped to Copenhagen, Denmark, to pick up freight, then was taken to Montreal and Houghton, Michigan, United States. As a canaller, she carried diversified "package" freight between Canadian ports. Her chief duty was carrying manufactured goods from Montreal up the lakes to Thunder Bay, Ontario, Canada. As Canada was still a part of the British Empire in the 1920s, the economically fast-growing Prairie Provinces bought a significant quantity of their manufactured goods from England. Canada's freshwater fleet, including Kamloops, was an essential link in this vein of imperial commerce.

It is the custom of Great Lakes shipping to try to move as much freight as possible before winter and associated ice conditions bring boat movements to a halt. Kamloops's owners operated the ship as late into the season as possible: in 1924 it was one of the last vessels to pass through the Sault Ste. Marie Canal, and in 1926 it ended the season stuck in the ice in the St. Mary's River. She remained under British registry until 1926 when it was nominally purchased by new owners, Canada Steamship Lines, and re-registered in Canada.

== December 1927 ==
Kamloops was dispatched up the lakes in late November 1927, carrying a mixed cargo of tar paper, papermaking machinery, coiled wire for farm fencing, piping, shoes and foodstuffs. On 1 December, the steamer called at Courtright, Ontario, to top off its cargo with some bagged salt. She then steamed up Lake Huron, passed through the Sault Ste. Marie Canal on 4 December, and faced the challenge of Lake Superior. Unfortunately for Kamloops and other vessels assigned to Lake Superior runs, a massive storm began hammering the lake on 5 December. Kamloops, heavily coated with ice, was last seen steaming towards the southeastern shore of Isle Royale at dusk on the following day, 6 December. The ship, and the twenty-two men and women aboard, were never seen alive again.

A search for Kamloops began on 12 December, concentrating on the Keweenaw Peninsula and Isle Royale; the search continued until 22 December. When the 1928 navigation season opened in April, a further search was made for wreckage from Kamloops. In May, fishermen discovered the remains of several crewmembers at Twelve O'Clock Point on Isle Royale (erroneously reported to be on the nearby Amygdaloid Island). In addition, wreckage from the ship was discovered ashore. In June, more bodies were discovered. A more comprehensive search for the wreck and crewmembers was undertaken, but nothing was found.

Of the nine bodies recovered from Kamloops, five were identified and the remains shipped to next of kin. Four remained unidentified and were buried at Thunder Bay. A collective memorial stone was placed over their gravesite in 2011.

== Message in a bottle ==
In December 1928, a trapper working at the mouth of the Agawa River found a bottled note from Alice Bettridge, a young assistant stewardess who initially survived the sinking of Kamloops and, before she herself perished, wrote, "I am the last one left alive, freezing and starving to death on Isle Royale in Lake Superior. I just want mom and dad to know my fate."

== Kamloops today ==
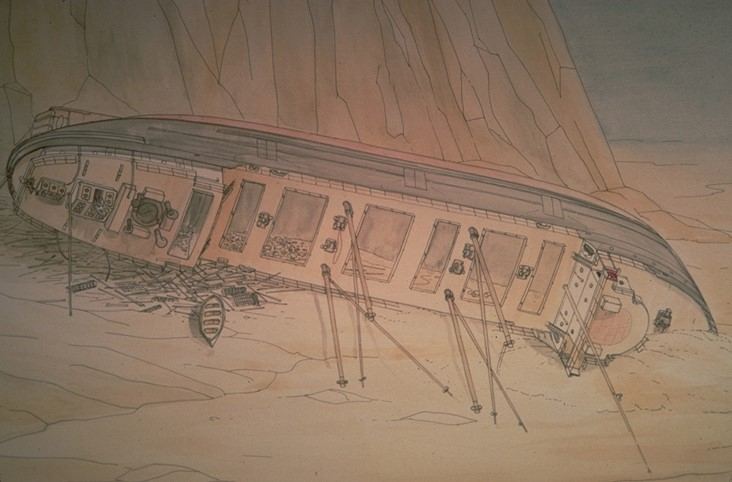
Diagram of Kamloops wreckage

For fifty years, Kamloops was one of the "Ghost Ships of the Great Lakes", having sunk without a trace. However, on 21 August 1977, her wreck was discovered northwest of Isle Royale, near what is now known as Kamloops Point, by a group of sport divers carrying out a systematic search for the ship. The ship, discovered sitting on the lake bottom under more than 260 feet (79 m) of water, is lying on its starboard side at the base of an underwater cliff. Its detached smokestack lies a short distance away, near the starboard aft cargo mast. Some cargo remains in the holds, while other cargo is strewn around the wreck site. There are still human remains aboard the ship, including the remains of a crew member lodged under a stairway in the engine room, nicknamed "Old Whitey". Approximately fifty dives were made to Kamloops out of 1,062 dives made to wrecks in the Isle Royale National Park in 2009. The exact cause of her sinking remains a mystery.

Kamloops features prominently in the novel A Superior Death by Nevada Barr. In the novel, the body of a fictional contemporary diver is found together with the historical human remains in the ship's engine room.
