= New Feldtmann Fire Tower =

- U.S. National Register of Historic Places
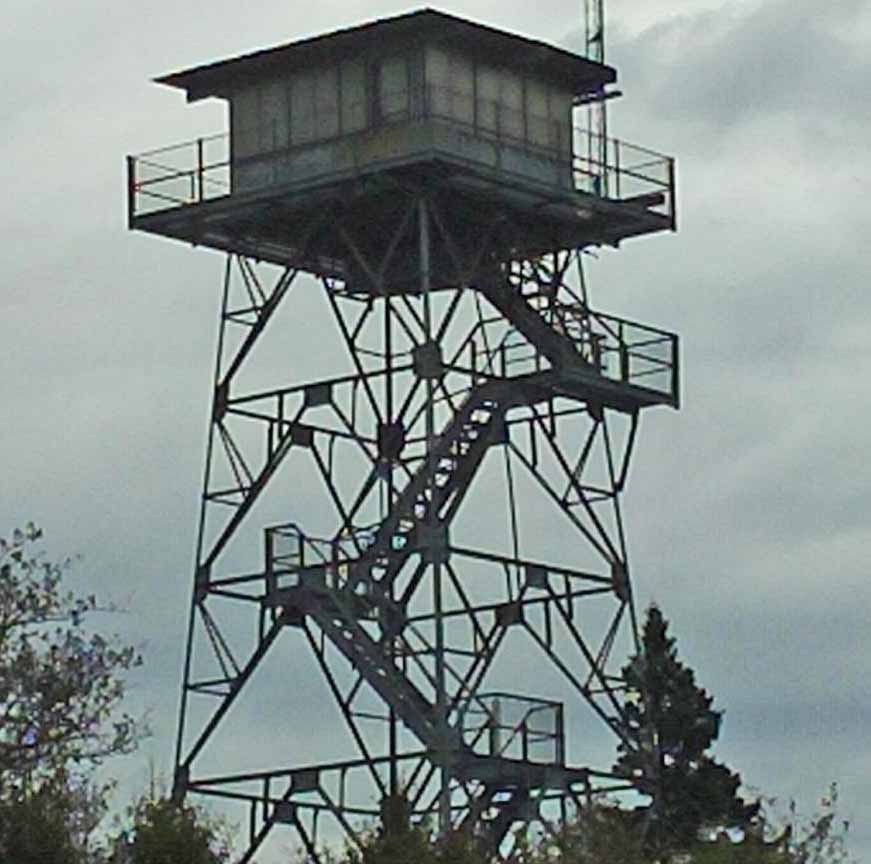

- Location within Michigan Location within the United States
- Interactive map
- Location: Feldtmann Ridge Trail, Isle Royale NP
- Coordinates: 47°51′40″N 89°5′35″W
- Built: 1964
- MPS: Isle Royale National Park Fire Towers MPS
- NRHP reference No.: 100006000
- Added to NRHP: January 5, 2021

The New Feldtmann Fire Tower is a fire tower located on Feldtmann Ridge in Isle Royale National Park. The tower was listed on the National Register of Historic Places in 2021.

== History ==
In 1936, soon after Isle Royale was designated a national park, the large Greenstone Ridge Fire swept through a portion of the island. In response, the National Park Service constructed two fire towers on the island, one on Mount Ojibway, and one near this location, referred to as the "Old Feldtmann Fire Tower." These towers were constructed of wood, and by the 1950s were badly deteriorating. Plans were in place by 1961 to replace them, but funds were not available until two years later. In 1963, the Old Feldtmann Fire Tower was torn down, and in 1964 construction began on a new tower, located in a slightly different location so as to better cover the portions of the park that were most used. The tower was completed in 1965.

By 1968, however, the fire management strategies in the park had changed, and the tower was abandoned. As of 2020, the tower was accessible to park visitors, who could climb partway up the structure.

== Description ==
The New Feldtmann Fire Tower is located on Feldtmann Ridge, a prominent rock ridge. It is surrounded by evergreen trees and shrubs, and is accessible by the Feldtmann Ridge Trail. The tower itself is constructed of pre-fabricated angle steel, bolted together to form a tower 41' 3" tall. The tower sits on four concrete piers spaced about 20' apart. A metal stairway runs from a concrete pad at the base of the tower to an access hatch for the balcony at the top. A pre-fabricated cab, measuring about 14' by 14' and 14' high, is located at the top of the tower. The exterior of the cab is built from steel panels with metal frame windows on all four sides. The windows covered with steel plates for protection. The cab has a flat, corrugated metal roof, and a metal entrance door on one side.
