= Rock Harbor Light =

Lighthouse in Michigan, United States

Rock Harbor Lighthouse
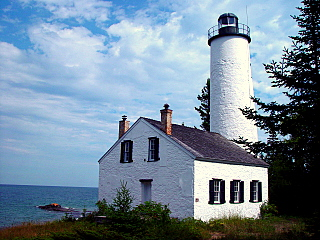
- Undated USCG photo of the station
- Location: Rock Harbor, Isle Royale National Park, Michigan
- Coordinates: 48°5′21″N 88°34′45″W

Tower
- Constructed: 1855
- Construction: brick/stone
- Height: 50 feet (15 m)
- Markings: White with black lantern
- Heritage: National Register of Historic Places listed place

Light
- First lit: 1856
- Lens: Fourth order Fresnel lens
- Rock Harbor Lighthouse
- U.S. National Register of Historic Places
- Michigan State Historic Site
- NRHP reference No.: 77000154
- Added to NRHP: March 8, 1977

The Rock Harbor Lighthouse is a light station located in Rock Harbor on Isle Royale National Park, Michigan. It was listed on the National Register of Historic Places in 1977.

== Description ==
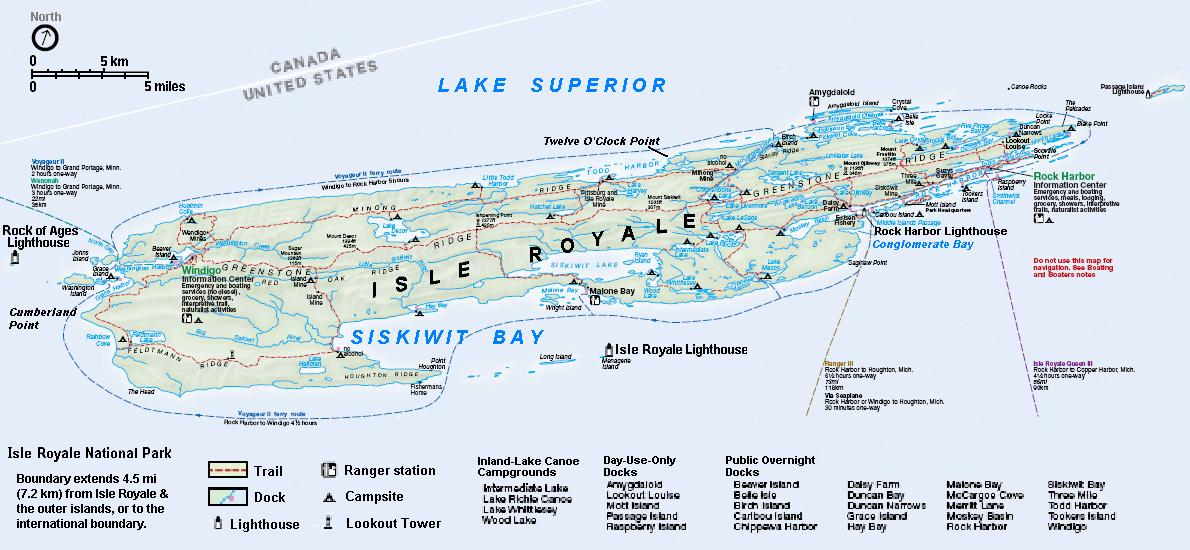
Rock Harbor Lighthouse (center bottom) is located in Rock Harbor on Isle Royale (right-click image to enlarge).

The Rock Harbor Lighthouse is a 50-foot-tall (15 m) cylindrical tower with a 16-foot-diameter (4.9 m) base, constructed of randomly placed stone and brick, capped with an octagonal beacon with a copper roof. A one-and-a-half-story keeper's house with gabled roof is connected to the tower on one end.

== History ==
In 1852, due to the increase in shipping in Lake Superior, it was recommended that a new light be constructed on Isle Royale; the next year, Congress appropriated $5,000 to construct a light at Rock Harbor. Construction began in 1855, and was completed in 1856. The Rock Island Light was the first lighthouse constructed on Isle Royale. The first keeper arrived at the station on October 24, 1856, and the lighthouse went into operation a short time later.

The light had been staffed for less than three years when it was determined that, due to the decrease in mining traffic, it was no longer required. It was extinguished on August 1, 1859, and the lighthouse was abandoned. During the American Civil War, copper mining increased once more, and in 1873 renovations began on the station, leading to the reactivation of the light on August 5, 1874. However, after another drop in copper prices, and following the activation in 1875 of the Isle Royale Light at Menagerie Island, the Rock Harbor Light was rendered less useful. On October 4, 1879, the Rock Harbor lighthouse was deactivated for the second and last time, having been in service for a total of only eight years since its construction.

In 1910, the keeper's house was altered, including the addition of dormers. In the 1950s, the tower began to tilt, and an emergency stabilization was undertaken; the tower still leans approximately 2 degrees. The original wooden roof of the structure was replaced with asphalt in 1962, and the foundation was stabilized in 1969. The station is currently not staffed.
