= Tobin Harbor Historic District =

Historic district in Michigan, United States

- U.S. National Register of Historic Places
- U.S. Historic district
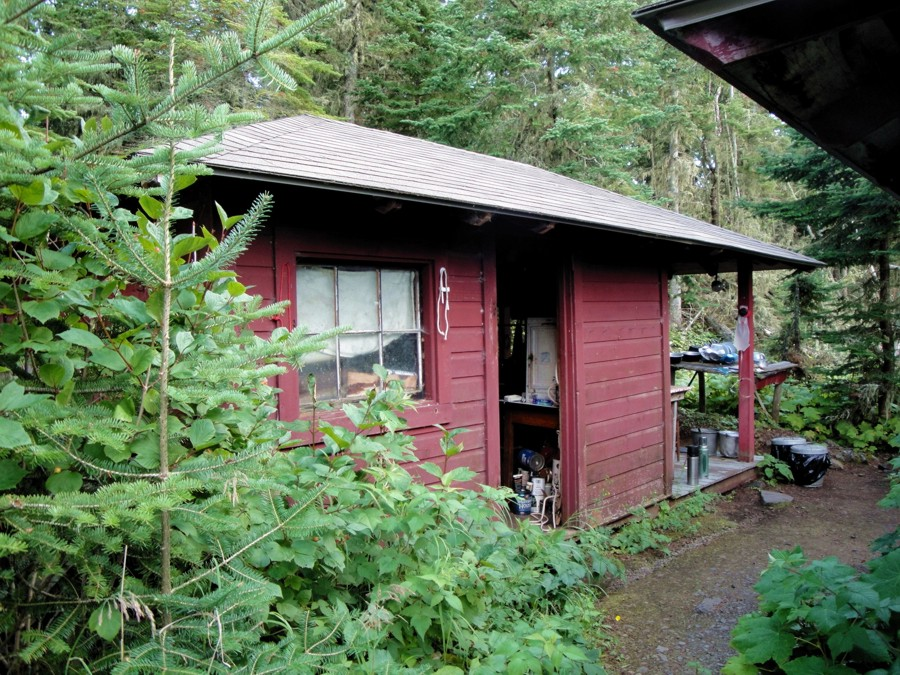
- Edwards Store House

- Location within Michigan Location within the United States
- Interactive map
- Location: Isle Royale National Park, Michigan
- Coordinates: 48°9′45″N 88°27′42″W
- NRHP reference No.: 100004256
- Added to NRHP: August 5, 2019

The Tobin Harbor Historic District is a small resort community, consisting of 12 private camps and a fishery, scattered among several islands at the northeast end of Isle Royale near Rock Harbor. It was listed on the National Register of Historic Places in 2019.

== History ==
Tourism on Isle Royale began in the late 1800s as steamship companies advertised the area. Around 1900, fisherman Gus Mattson began boarding guests at his fishing station located on Minong Island in Tobin Harbor. Over the next decade, a number of cottages and guest houses were constructed on and around Minong Island. In 1906, Mattson sold his Minong Island resort to three men from Calumet, Michigan, who renamed it the Tobin's Harbor Summer Resort (and later the "Minong Lodge"). Gradually, other resorts were established, and small summer communities began to grow around the area, which continued into the late 1920s. However, the rise of the automobile led to diminishing travel by steamship, and Isle Royale became harder to reach. Visits to the island began to decline.

Local resort owners advocated for the establishment of a national park on the island, hoping that would increase tourism. In 1936, the federal government began to purchase private property on Isle Royale, for the purpose of creating a national park. The National Park Service took over operation of some resorts in the area. However, as tourism on the island changed, these were gradually closed, and many buildings removed. Some of the remaining structures have deteriorated and are overgrown, although some are still occupied by children of the original owners under a life lease.

== Description ==
The camps in the Tobin Harbor Historic District are typically a small collection of single story frame structures. These include a main residence, one or two guest cabins, a privy, and occasionally other buildings. The residences are seasonal, with unfinished interiors, wood stove heating, and usually no power or plumbing. They are generally small frame buildings with lap or shiplap siding and gabled or hipped roofs covered with asphalt roll or asphalt shingle. They commonly have deep, full-width front porch, often enclosed, with a view of the water. Windows in the structures are double hung units, either six over sixes, or one over one, two, six or eights. The buildings have concrete block, stone or log pier foundations, or directly are set directly on stone.

There are 13 groups of buildings in the district: 12 private camps and a fishery. These are:

- Mattson Fishery, consisting of two residences, a privy, fish house, dock, and a number of storage buildings. Substantially deteriorated.
- Snell Camp, consisting of a cottage, guest house, store house, and a "writing shack." Most have a high degree of historic integrity.
- Siefert Camp, consisting of a cottage, storage building, privy and crib dock. Most have a high degree of historic integrity.
- Connolly Camp, consisting of a cottage, guest house, crib dock and privy. Most have a high degree of historic integrity.
- Kemmer Camp, consisting of a residence, guest house, store house, boat house, privy, dock, concrete steps and a peeled pole rail. These buildings are used as park residences, and have a high degree of historic integrity.
- Beard Camp, consisting of a cottage, storage building and privy. All have a high degree of historic integrity.
- Edwards Camp, consisting of a cottage, dining room, privy, store house. All have a high degree of historic integrity.
- Merritt Camp, consisting of a main cottage, three guest cottages, privy, woodshed and dock. Most have a high degree of historic integrity.
- Stack/Wolbrink Camp, consisting of cottage, guest house, privy and stone retaining wall. All have a high degree of historic integrity.
- Gale Camp, consisting of a cottage, guest cottage, tool shed/wash house, privy and dock. Most have a high degree of historic integrity.
- How Camp, consisting of a cottage and a guest cabin. All have a high degree of historic integrity.
- Dassler Camp, consisting of a cottage, guest house, boathouse and privy. Most have a high degree of historic integrity.
- Savage Camp, consisting of boat house and a storage shed. Substantially deteriorated.
- Minong Lodge Cabin, consisting of the only remaining cabin of the Minong Lodge complex. Substantially deteriorated.
