= Minong Traditional Cultural Property =

- Minong
- U.S. National Register of Historic Places
- U.S. Historic district
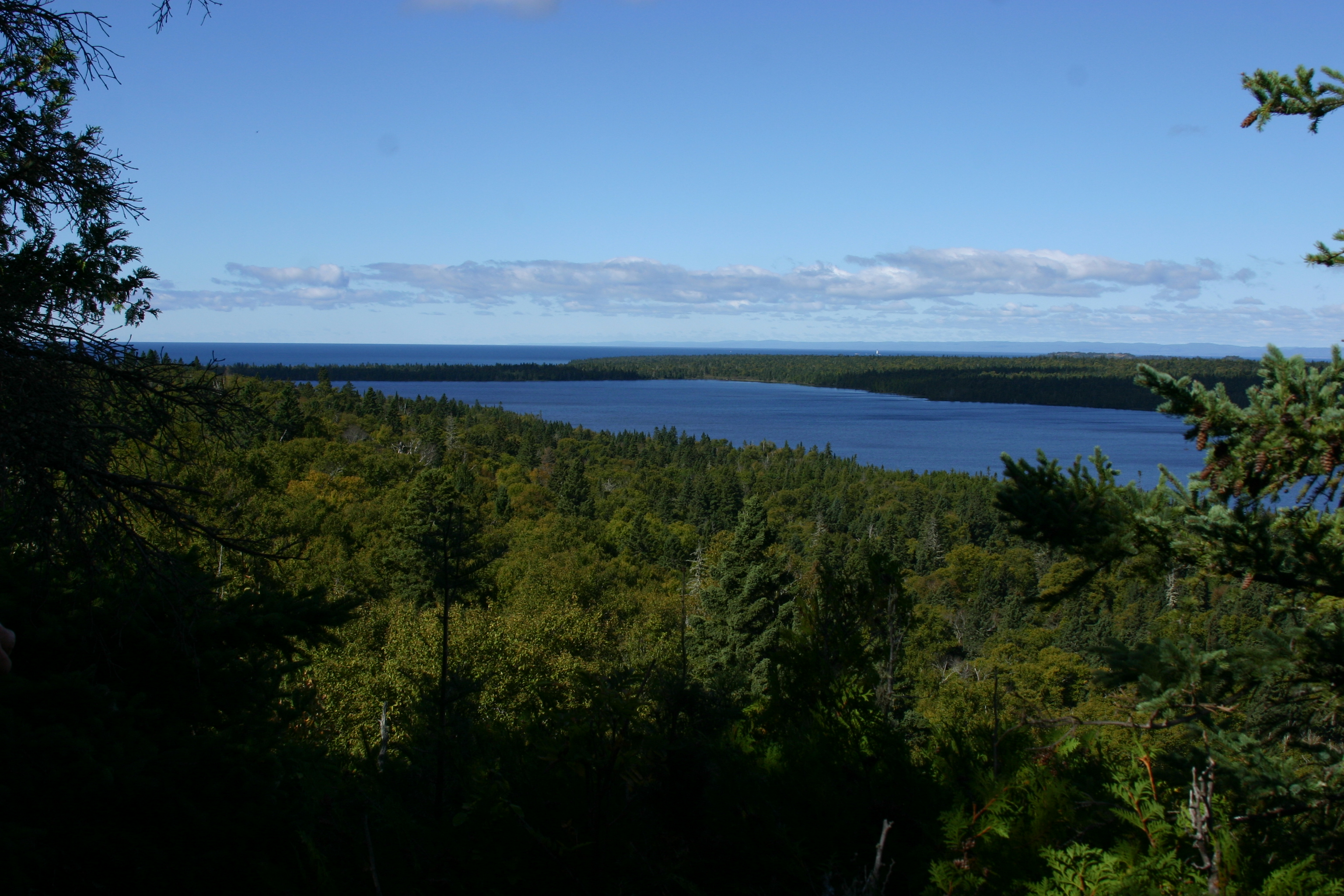
- Siskiwit Bay

- Location within Michigan Location within the United States
- Location: Isle Royale National Park, Michigan
- Coordinates: 48°0′0″N 88°55′0″W
- Area: 189,665 acres (76,755 ha) [133,788 acres (54,142 ha) land and 55,877 acres (22,613 ha) water]
- NRHP reference No.: 100003341
- Added to NRHP: January 24, 2019

The Minong Traditional Cultural Property is a Traditional Cultural Property (TCP), which was listed on the National Register of Historic Places in 2019. Minong is the Ojibwe name for Isle Royale, and the TCP designation recognizes the lasting relationship the Grand Portage Band of Lake Superior Chippewa has with the island. The TCP covers the island itself, the greater archipelago, and the traditional fishing waters surrounding the islands.

== History and significance ==
Archeological evidence suggests that the Ojibwe have used Minong for fishing and copper mining far back in prehistoric times, but it is unclear whether this evidence is from people from the Grand Portage Band or another closely related tribe. The first known written document that confirms Ojibwe on Minong dates from c. 1794. Travel to and from Minong from the mainland was common during this time period. As Europeans moved into the area, the Ojibwe became involved with commercial trapping and fishing, and commercial and subsistence fishing on Isle Royale continued for many decades into the nineteenth century.

During the twentieth century, members of the Grand Portage Band continued to use Minong for subsistence hunting, fishing, trapping, and maple sugaring, as well as commercial ventures in these areas. Some members were also involved in resort and recreation on the island. This continues to the present day, as the Band opened the Grand Portage Marina in 1971, providing a place for boats to leave from Grand Portage to Isle Royale National Park for fishing and diving expeditions.

== Contributing elements ==
The contributing elements to the Minong Traditional Cultural Property are natural places, including harbors and coves, rather than specific buildings or docks. These elements include the Grand Portage Band's traditional use areas on the island, as well as locations of specific historical significance. Natural elements include McCargoe Cove, Todd Harbor, Siskiwit Bay, Checker Point, Indian Point, Grace Point and Island, Sugar Mountain, Greenstone Beach, Chippewa Harbor, Carnelian Beach, Rock Harbor, Pickerel Cove, Fishermans Home, and Washington Harbor. These represent places that the Grand Portage Ojibwe used as miners, fishermen, tour guides, or other uses. The TCP also includes one off-site contributing feature: the Little Cedar Spirit Tree, or Manito Geezhigaynce, which is located on the north side of Hat Point on the Grand Portage Indian Reservation.
