= Ishpeming Fire Tower =

- U.S. National Register of Historic Places
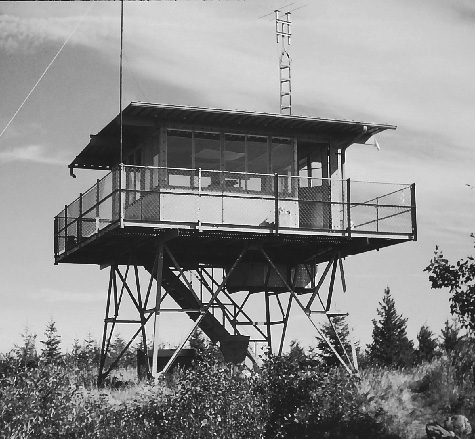

- Location within Michigan Location within the United States
- Interactive map
- Location: Greenstone Ridge Trail, Isle Royale NP
- Coordinates: 47°59′39″N 88°54′55″W
- Built: 1961
- MPS: Isle Royale National Park Fire Towers MPS
- NRHP reference No.: 100006001
- Added to NRHP: January 5, 2021

The Ishpeming Fire Tower is a fire tower located on Greenstone Ridge in Isle Royale National Park. The tower was listed on the National Register of Historic Places in 2021.

== History ==
In 1936, soon after Isle Royale was designated a national park, the large Greenstone Ridge Fire swept through a portion of the island. In response, the National Park Service constructed two fire towers on the island. By the 1950s, these were badly deteriorating, and plans were made to renew the fire infrastructure of the island. In 1961, construction began on this tower. By 1968, however, the fire management strategies in the park had changed, and eventually the tower was abandoned.

== Description ==
The Ishpeming Fire Tower is located on Greenstone Ridge, a prominent rock ridge. It is nearly obscured by surrounding evergreen trees and shrubs, and is accessible by the Greenstone Ridge Trail. The tower itself is constructed of pre-fabricated angle steel, bolted together to form a tower about ten feet high. The tower sits on four concrete piers spaced about 14' apart. A metal stairway runs from a concrete pad at the base of the tower to an access hatch for the balcony at the top. A pre-fabricated cab, measuring about 14' by 14' and 14' high, is located at the top of the tower. The exterior of the cab is built from steel panels with metal frame windows on all four sides. The cab has a flat metal roof, and a metal entrance door on one side.
