= Isle Royale Light =

Lighthouse on Isle Royale in Michigan, United States

Isle Royale Light (Menagerie Island Light)
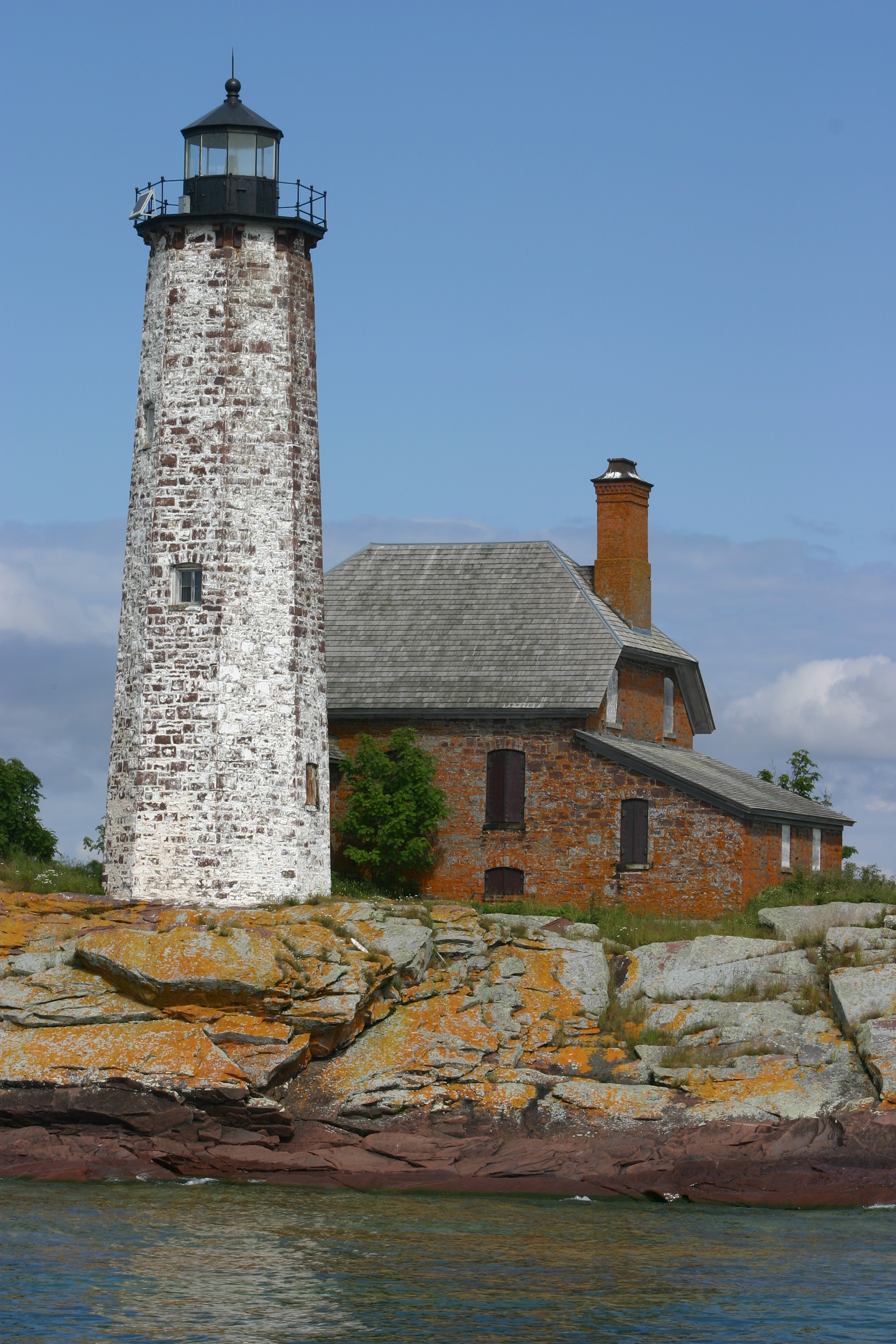
- The light in 2004
- Location: Menagerie Island, Houghton Township, Keweenaw County, Michigan
- Coordinates: 47°56′52.44″N 88°45′40.32″W

Tower
- Constructed: 1875
- Foundation: Rock
- Construction: Red Sandstone
- Automated: 1913
- Height: height - 61 feet (19 m)
- Shape: Octagonal
- Heritage: National Register of Historic Places listed place

Light
- First lit: 1875
- Focal height: 74 feet (23 m)
- Lens: Fourth order Fresnel Lens (original), 12-inch (300 mm) Tideland Signal Acrylic optic (ML-300) (current)
- Range: 8.7 nautical miles; 16 kilometres (10 mi)
- Characteristic: Fl W 6s
- Isle Royale Light Station
- U.S. National Register of Historic Places
- Nearest city: Isle Royale, Michigan
- Built: 1875
- MPS: U.S. Coast Guard Lighthouses and Light Stations on the Great Lakes TR
- NRHP reference No.: 83000880
- Added to NRHP: August 04, 1983

The Isle Royale Light, or Menagerie Island Light, is a lighthouse within Isle Royale National Park, in Keweenaw County, northern Michigan, United States.

== Description ==
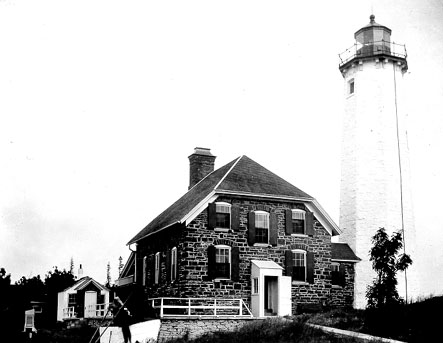
Isle Royale Lighthouse

It is located in Lake Superior on Menagerie Island, the most easterly of the group of small islands at the opening of Siskiwit Bay, near the southern shore of Isle Royale.

The light's residence has steel shutters for protection from stormwater damage, as this portion of Lake Superior has very severe storms.

== History ==
The Isle Royale Light was built in 1875 of red sandstone, as a U.S. Coast Guard lighthouse.

It was placed on the National Register of Historic Places in 1983.
