= Rock Harbor (Michigan) =

Natural inlet on Isle Royale in Lake Superior, United States

Rock Harbor, Michigan
- Unincorporated community
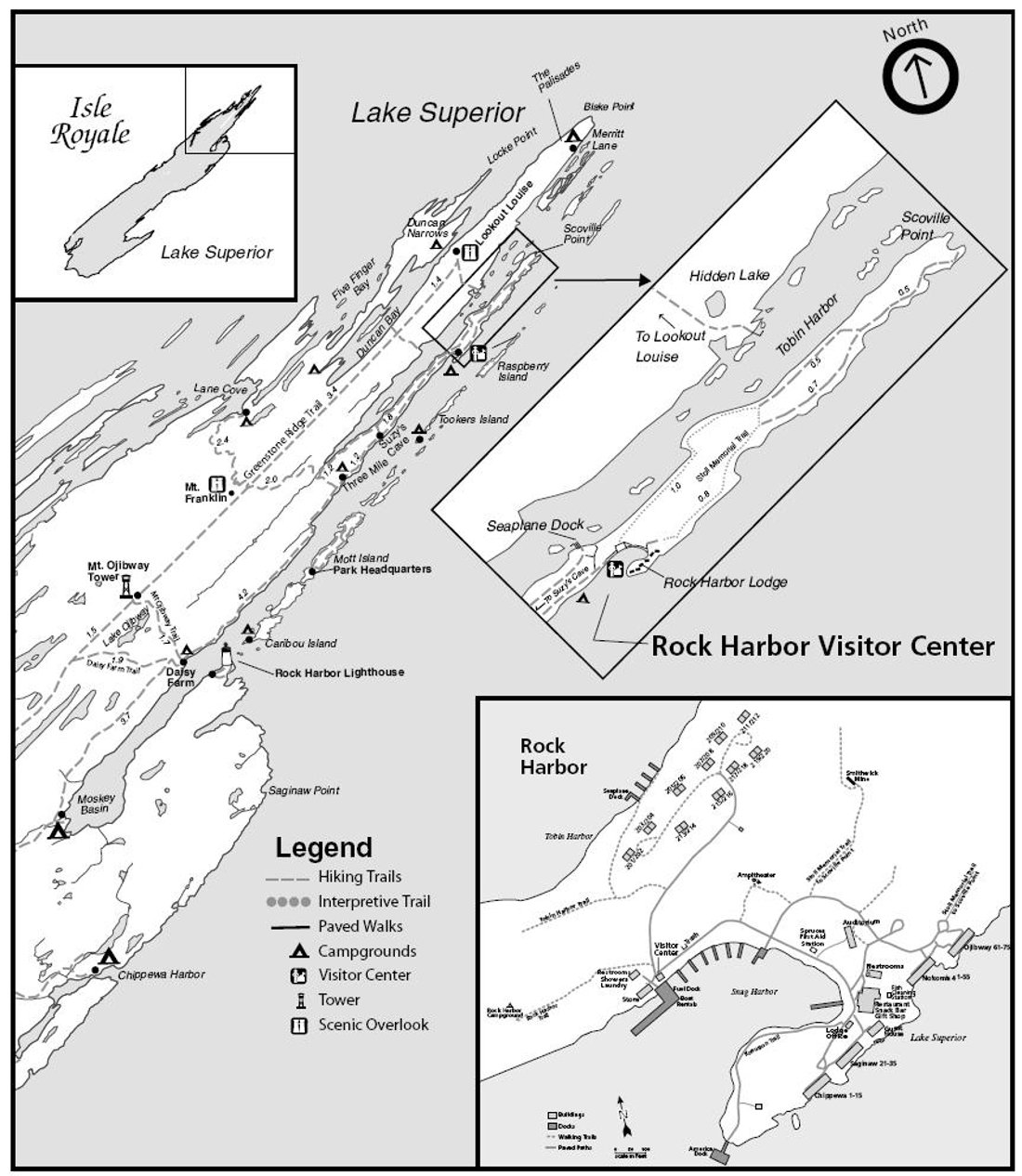
- Map of Rock Harbor on the northeast side of Isle Royale

- Location within the state of Michigan Location within the United States
- Coordinates: 48°05′21″N 88°34′45″W
- Country: United States
- State: Michigan
- County: Keweenaw
- Township: Houghton
- Elevation: 610 ft (190 m)
- Time zone: UTC-5 (Eastern (EST))
  - Summer (DST): UTC-4 (EDT)
- ZIP code(s): 49931 (Houghton)
- Area code: 906
- GNIS feature ID: 636080

Rock Harbor is the main access point for visitors landing on Isle Royale in northern Lake Superior. It sits four miles (6.4 km) from the northeastern end of the 45-mile-long (72 km) island, the whole of which is protected as Isle Royale National Park. Two structures in Rock Harbor—the Rock Harbor Light and the Edisen Fishery—are listed on the National Register of Historic Places.

The name Rock Harbor is properly applied to the 11-mile-long (18 km) inlet from Moskey Basin to Scoville Point along the southern shore of the eastern part of Isle Royale. This inlet is screened from the open waters of Lake Superior by several offshore islands, including Mott Island, which is the site of the park headquarters.

Travel to Rock Harbor from the Upper Peninsula of Michigan is by the Ranger III park service ferry, operating from Houghton, Michigan, the Isle Royale Queen IV out of Copper Harbor, Michigan, and seaplane service. The Voyageur II operates out of Grand Portage, Minnesota; it circumnavigates the island with stops at the Ozaagaateng Ranger Station in Washington Harbor on the west end of the island and other points along the shore.

The ferry boats land at Snug Harbor, which also has berths for private watercraft, a campground, the visitor center, and a lodge that predates the national park.

Rock Harbor is the eastern end and terminus of the Greenstone Ridge Trail.

Rock Harbor is also listed by the Geographic Names Information System as a populated place named Rock Harbor Lodge. Although there is no permanent population, the area includes the Rock Harbor Lodge, restaurant, resorts, several boat docks, and campgrounds. Rock Harbor also contained its own summer post office from 1924 to 1958.
