= Minong Mine Historic District =

Archaeological site in Michigan, United States

- Minong Copper Mining Historic District
- U.S. National Register of Historic Places
- U.S. National Historic Landmark District
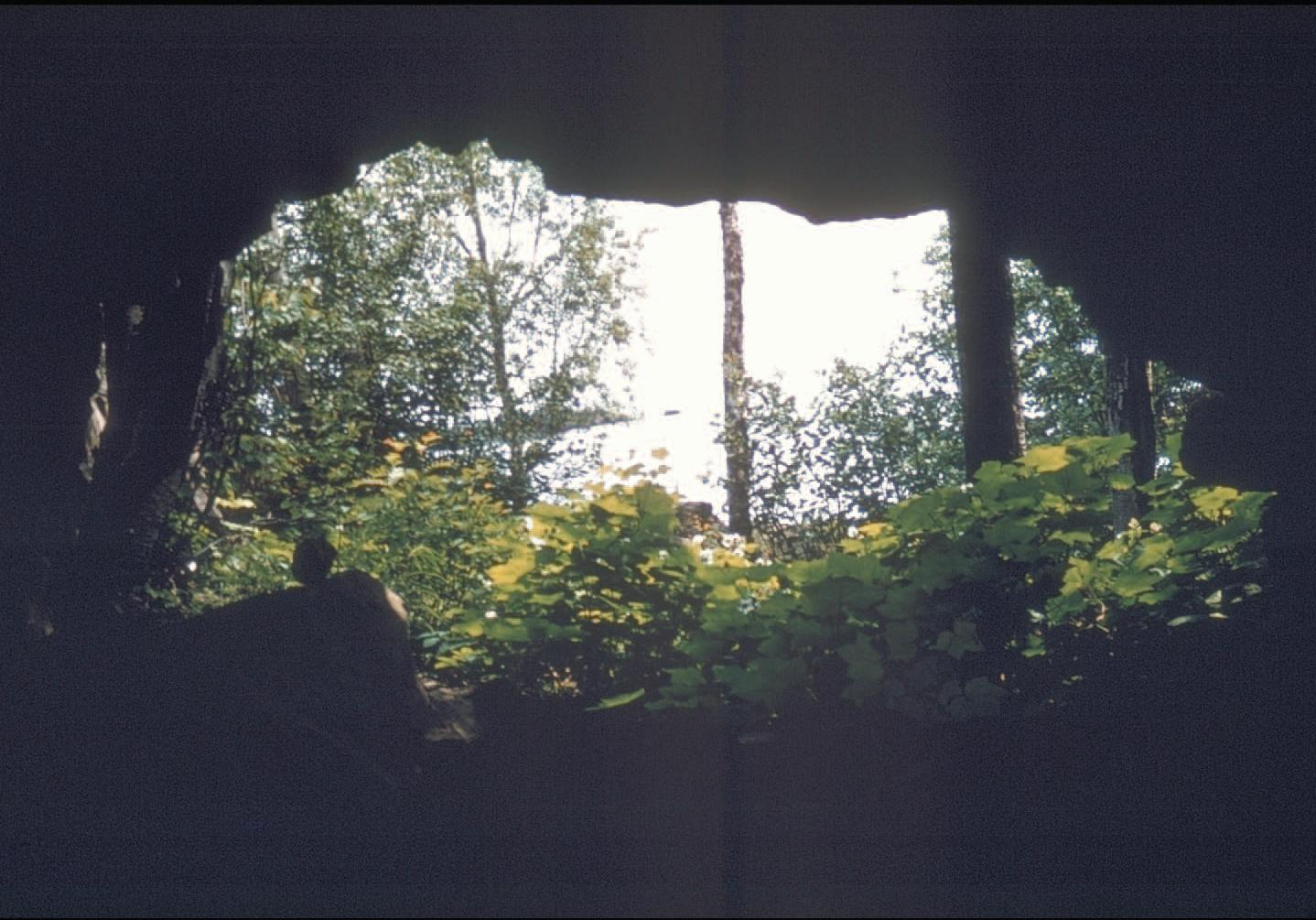
- Shaft entrance at Minong Mine

- Location within Michigan Location within the United States
- Interactive map
- Location: west of McCargoe Cove campground, Isle Royale National Park, Michigan
- Coordinates: 48°4′58″N 88°43′35″W
- Area: 275 acres (111 ha)
- NRHP reference No.: 77000153, 100006259

Significant dates
- Added to NRHP: November 11, 1977
- Designated NHLD: January 13, 2021

The Minong Mine is a historic mine site located west of McCargoe Cove campground on Isle Royale National Park, Michigan, United States. The district contains both the remnants of a 19th-century copper mine and remains of pre-contact mining activity. Pre-contact archeological sited in the district include a Late Archaic copper mining pit site designated 20KE24 and a nearby site designated 20KE73. It was listed on the National Register of Historic Places in 1977 and designated a National Historic Landmark in 2021.

== Prehistoric mining ==
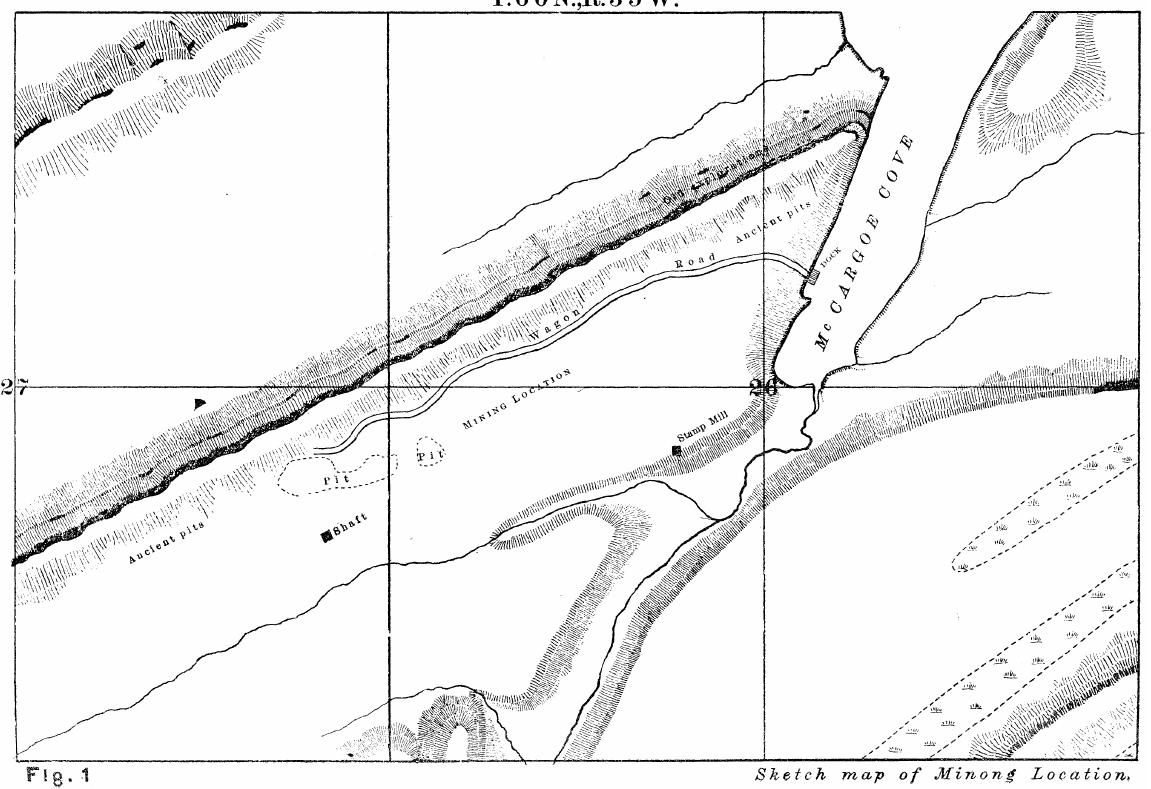
Sketch of Minong Mine location

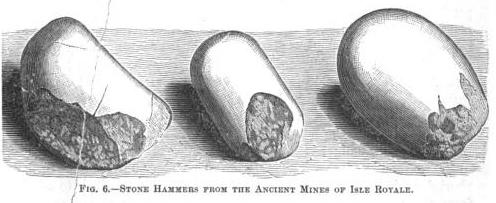
Stone hammers used by prehistoric miners

Native Americans first began mining copper at the Minong Mine site 4500 years ago, using stone implements to extract the pure copper available at the site and cold-hammering the metal to form spear points and other implements. These prehistoric miners created pits, some as much as 30 feet deep, that can still be seen at the site. Some pits showed evidence of early engineering efforts, using boulders to support the walls of the pit and drains to remove water. There was evidence that these ancient miners utilized fire-setting, where rocks were split by heating them with fire and rapidly cooling them with water to extract the copper within.

When re-discovered in the 19th century, the prehistoric excavations in the Minong Mine area were described as extending "in almost a continuous line for more than two miles, in most instances the pits being so close together as barely to permit their convenient working." A number of ancient mining artifacts were collected from the Minong site; primarily smooth cobbles used as hammers which were, it was said "collected by the cartload." In addition, a fragment of a wooden bowl about three feet across, a wooden shovel, and a rawhide string were also discovered at the site.

== The Minong Mine (1872–1885) ==
Modern copper mining on Isle Royale was begun in the 1840s and 1850s, although not at the Minong Mine site. This activity ceased in 1855, and for a number of years there were no permanent inhabitants on the island. In 1871, a group of explorers working for the North American Mineral Land Company arrived on the island. In the fall of that year, the explorers found the old Native American pit mines west of McCargoe Cove. In 1872, a group of prospectors returned and staked out the Minong Mine.

In late 1874, the Minong Mining Company was organized in Detroit to mine the copper deposits in the area. The name "Minong" was taken from an Ojibwa word for "island" in general and Isle Royale in particular. This company purchased land from the North American Mineral Land Company and commenced a mining operation in 1875.

Most of the copper mining was still done in open pit mining, but two shafts, one over 300 feet, were also sunk at the mine. In 1875, more than 50 people were working at the Minong Mine and living in the nearby settlement of Cove, at the end of McCargoe Cove. Later, at the height of the Minong operation, some 150 miners were employed at the mine. A railroad ran between the mine proper and Cove, and the mining settlement had a post office, a dam, a stamp mill (built in 1876), a dock, and a blacksmith's shop.

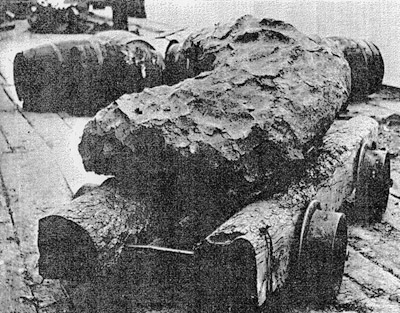
5720 pound nugget from mine

The mine produced some large nuggets of copper; the first, in 1874, was a 5720-pound nugget which was subsequently displayed on the courthouse lawn in Detroit and at the 1876 Centennial Exhibition. This copper mass showed evidence of being worked by prehistoric miners, "the surface of the mass had evidently been beaten up into projecting ridges... depressions, several inches deep, and the intervening elevations, with their fractured summits, covering every foot of the exposed superficies." In 1878, a copper mass weighing six tons was discovered, and in 1879 two nuggets of 3317 and 4175 pounds were discovered.

In 1879, the Minong Mining Company was reorganized to form the Minong Copper Company, with its headquarters also located in Detroit. The Minong Copper Company continued work until June 1883, when they suspended mining operations, due in part to the low price of copper. A few individuals continued mining operations for another two years or so, but by 1885 all activity had ceased.

In the ten years between 1875 and 1885, Minong Mine produced 249 tons of copper. However, the amount of copper produced slowly dwindled, and the mine was abandoned in 1885.

== The site today ==
The area around Minong Mine sports small prehistoric pits, as well as the larger pits (now filled with water) and shafts from the 1870s mine. Piles of tailings, the wreckage of a smithy, railroad tracks, and ore carts also are at the site. As of 1994, the dam near McCargoe Cove was still intact.

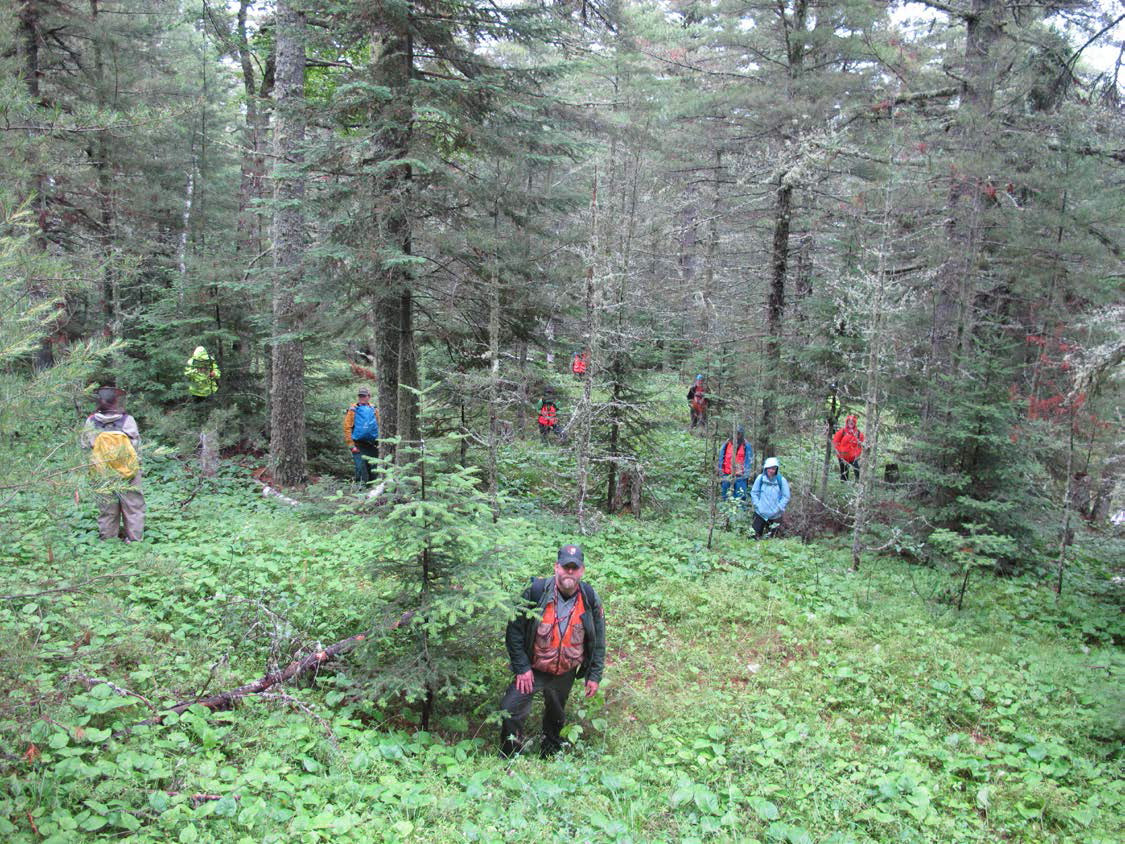
The general appearance of the precontact mining pit cluster landscape in 2015

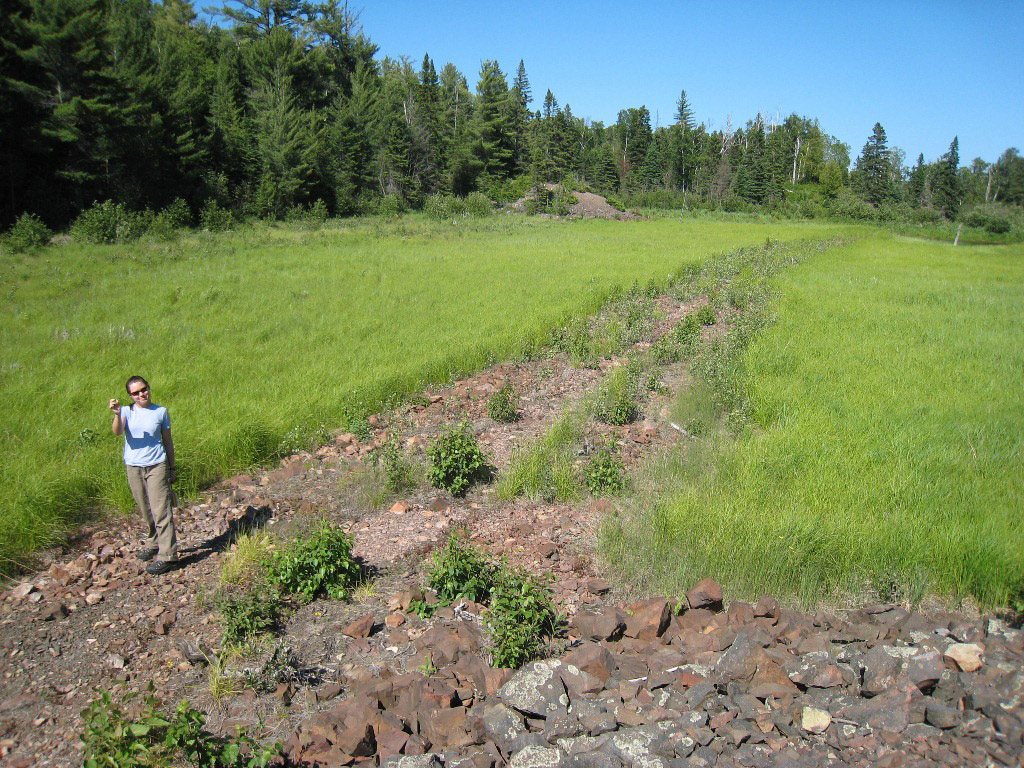
The Minong Mining Company Tramway remnants as they appeared in 2009

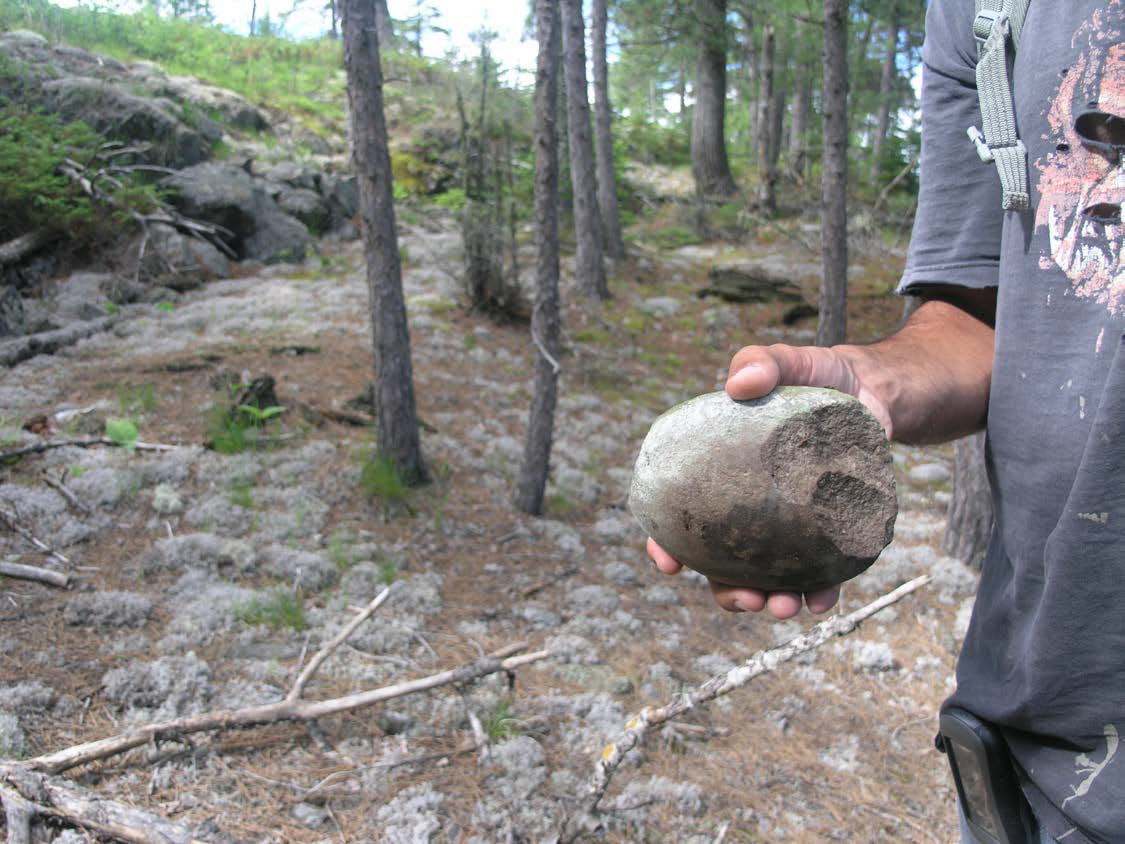
Hammerstone found beside precontact mining trench on Minong Ridge in 2012

== See also ==
- Copper mining in Michigan
