= List of rivers of Michigan =

This list of Michigan rivers includes all streams designated rivers although some may be smaller than those streams designated creeks, runs, brooks, swales, cuts, bayous, outlets, inlets, drains and ditches. These terms are all in use in Michigan. Other waterways are listed when they have articles.

The state has over 300 named rivers. Several names are shared by different rivers; for example, there are eight Pine Rivers and seven Black Rivers. In four cases there are two rivers of the same name in one county. In these cases extra information such as alternate name or body of water they flow into has been added.

Map of Michigan rivers

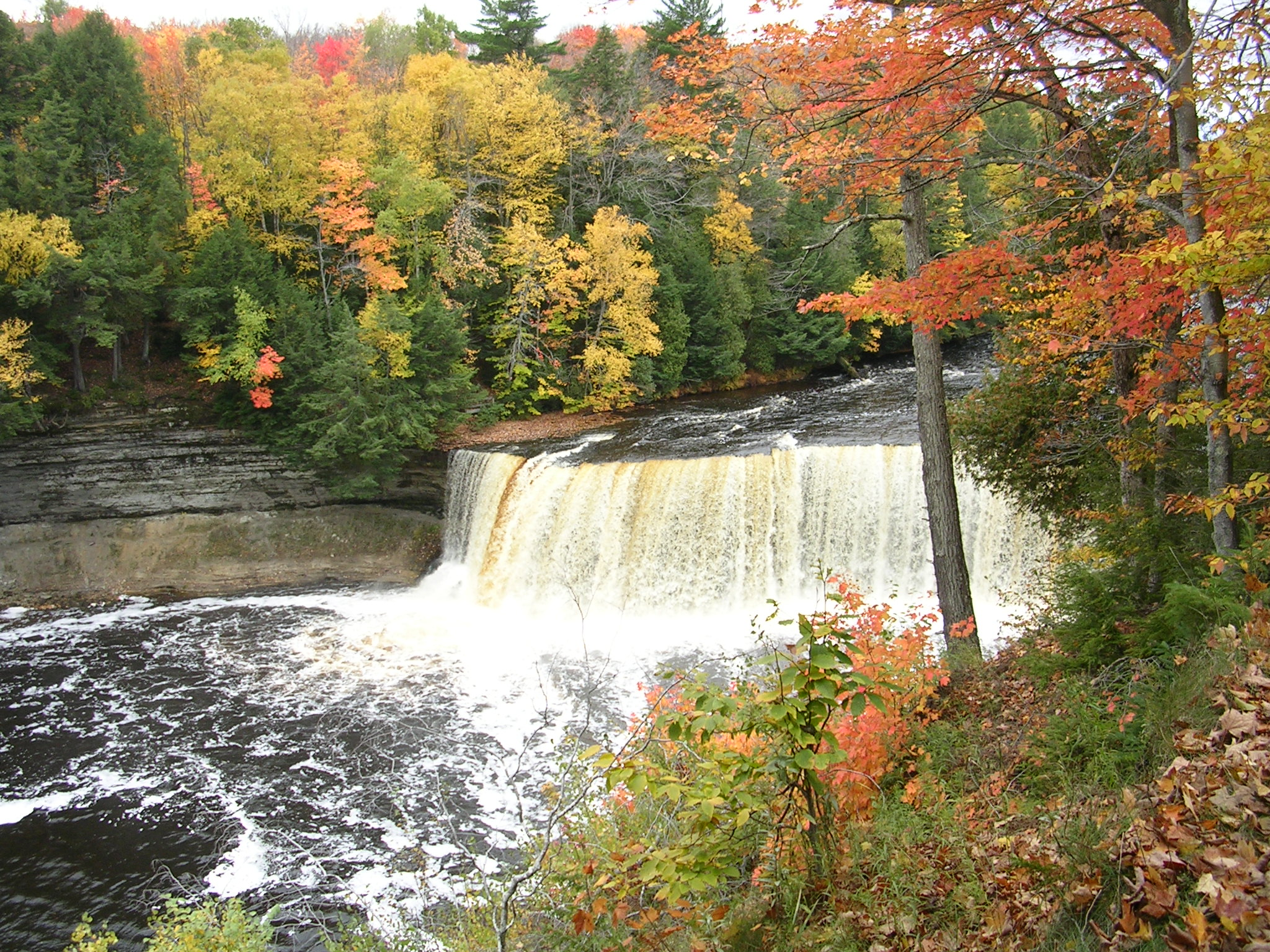
Tahquamenon River

== In alphabetical order ==
=== A–C ===
- Anna River
- Au Gres River
- Au Sable River
- Au Train River
- Bad River
- Baldwin River
- Baltimore River
- Bark River
- Bass River
- Battle Creek River
- Bean Creek (called Tiffin River in lower reaches)
- Bear River
- Bell River
- Belle River
- Betsie River
- Big Betsy River
- Big Garlic River
- Big Iron River
- Big River
- Big Sable River
- Big Siskiwit River
- Birch Creek
- Black Mallard River
- Black River (Alcona County)
- Black River (Allegan/Van Buren counties)
- Black River (Cheboygan/Montmorency/Presque Isle/Otsego counties)
- Black River (Gogebic County)
- Black River (Mackinac County)
- Black River (Marquette County)
- Black River (Sanilac/St. Clair counties)
- Blind Sucker River
- Boardman River
- Boyne River
- Brevoort River
- Brule River
- Buck Creek
- Canada Creek
- Carp Lake River
- Carp River (Chippewa/Mackinac County)
- Carp River (Gogebic/Ontonagon counties), sections also called Big Carp River and Upper Carp River or Carp River Inlet or Inlet Creek
- Carp River (Luce County), not on USGS maps
- Carp River (Marquette County)
- Cass River
- Cataract River
- Cedar Creek
- Cedar River (Antrim County)
- Cedar River (Clare/Gladwin counties)
- Cedar River (Menominee County)
- Charlotte River
- Cheboygan River
- Chippewa River
- Choate Creek
- Chocolay River
- Clam River
- Cliff River
- Clinton River
- Coldbrook Creek
- Coldwater River (Barry/Kent/Ionia counties)
- Coldwater River (Branch County)
- Coldwater River (Isabella counties)
- Cranberry River
- Creighton River
- Crooked River
- Crow River
- Crystal River
- Cut River (Mackinac County)
- Cut River (Roscommon County)

=== D–K ===
- Days River
- Dead River
- Dead Sucker River
- Deer River
- Detroit River
- Devils River
- Dingman River
- Dowagiac River
- Driggs River
- Duck River, also called Duck Creek
- Eagle River
- East Branch St. Joseph River
- East Sleeping River
- Ecorse River
- Elk River
- Elm River
- Escanaba River
- Falls River
- Fawn River
- Fence River
- Firesteel River
- Fishdam River
- Flat River
- Flint River
- Flintsteel River
- Floodwood River
- Ford River
- Fox River
- Galena River
- Galien River
- Gogomain River
- Gook Creek
- Goose Creek
- Grand River
- Grass River
- Gratiot River
- Graveraet River
- Green River, flows into Jordan River
- Green River, part of Intermediate River system
- Gun River
- Hemlock River
- Hendrie River
- Hersey River
- Huron River (Baraga/Marquette counties)
- Huron River (Monroe/Wayne/Washtenaw/Livingston/Oakland counties)
- Hurricane River
- Indian River (Alger/Schoolcraft counties)
- Indian River (Cheboygan County)
- Intermediate River
- Iron River (Iron County)
- Iron River (Marquette County)
- Joe Maddy River
- Jordan River
- Jordan River of Beaver Island
- Jumbo River
- Kalamazoo River
- Kawkawlin River
- Kelso River
- Kids Creek

=== L–M ===
- Laughing Whitefish River
- Leland River, also called the Carp River
- Lincoln River
- Little Betsie River (Lower Peninsula of Michigan)
- Little Betsy River (Upper Peninsula of Michigan)
- Little Black River (Cheboygan County)
- Little Black River (Gogebic County)
- Little Brevoort River
- Little Carp River (Baraga County)
- Little Carp River (Cheboygan County), also called Carp River and Carp Creek
- Little Carp River (Gogebic/Ontonagon counties)
- Little Cedar River (Gladwin County)
- Little Cedar River (Menominee County)
- Little Cranberry River
- Little Dead River
- Little Elm River
- Little Fawn River
- Little Fishdam River
- Little Fox River
- Little Garlic River
- Little Gratiot River
- Little Hemlock River
- Little Huron River
- Little Indian River
- Little Iron River
- Little Manistee River
- Little Maple River
- Little Misery River
- Little Molasses River
- Little Munuscong River
- Little Muskegon River
- Little Ocqueoc River
- Little Otter River
- Little Pigeon River (Cheboygan/Otsego Counties), empties into Pigeon River
- Little Pigeon River (Huron County)
- Little Presque Isle River
- Little Rabbit River
- Little Rainy River
- Little Rapid River
- Little River (Big Bay de Noc)
- Little River (Menominee River tributary)
- Little River Raisin
- Little Silver River
- Little Siskiwit River
- Little Sturgeon River
- Little Thornapple River, tributary of the Coldwater River in Barry County
- Little Thornapple River, tributary of the Thornapple River in Eaton County
- Little Tobacco River
- Little Trout River
- Little Two Hearted River
- Little Union River
- Looking Glass River
- Lower Millecoquins River
- Macatawa River
- Malletts Creek
- Manistee River
- Manistique River
- Maple Leaf Creek
- Maple River (Cheboygan/Emmett counties)
- Maple River (Ionia/Clinton/Gratiot/Shiawassee counties)
- Maple River (Newaygo/Muskegon counties)
- McCoy Creek
- Medora River
- Menominee River
- Michigamme River
- Middle Branch River
- Milakokia River
- Milk River
- Mineral River
- Miners River
- Misery River
- Misteguay Creek
- Mitchigan River
- Molasses River
- Montreal River (Keweenaw County)
- Montreal River (Wisconsin–Michigan border)
- Moran River
- Mosquito River
- Munuscong River
- Murphy River
- Muskegon River

=== N–R ===
- Net River
- New River
- North River
- Nottawa Creek (also known as Nottawa River)
- Ocqueoc River
- Ogontz River
- Ontonagon River
- Ore Creek (Livingston County)
- Ottawa River, usually called North Tenmile Creek
- Otter River
- Paint Creek (Oakland County)
- Paint Creek (Washtenaw/Monroe counties)
- Paint River
- Partridge Creek
- Paw Paw River
- Pelton River, also called Pelton Creek
- Pentwater River
- Perch River
- Pere Marquette River
- Peshekee River
- Pigeon River (Cheboygan/Otsego counties), empties into Mullett Lake
- Pigeon River (Huron County), empties into Saginaw Bay of Lake Huron
- Pigeon River (Ottawa County), empties into Lake Michigan
- Pigeon River (St. Joseph County), empties into the St. Joseph River
- Pike River
- Pilgrim River
- Pinconning River
- Pine Creek (Gratiot County)
- Pine River (Alcona/Iosco counties)
- Pine River (Arenac County)
- Pine River (Charlevoix County)
- Pine River (Chippewa/Mackinac counties)
- Pine River (Lake/Manistee/Osceola/Wexford counties), also called South Branch of Manistee River
- Pine River (Marquette County)
- Pine River (Mecosta/Isabella/Montcalm/Gratiot/Midland counties)
- Pine River (St. Clair County)
- Pinnebog River
- Plaster Creek
- Platte River
- Pointe aux Chenes River
- Portage River (Houghton County), the southern end of the Keweenaw Waterway
- Portage River (Jackson/Washtenaw counties), a tributary of the Grand River
- Portage River (Kalamazoo/St. Joseph counties), a tributary of the St. Joseph River
- Portage River (Livingston/Washtenaw counties), a tributary of the Huron River
- Potagannissing River
- Potato River
- Prairie River
- Presque Isle River
- Quanicassee River
- Rabbit River
- Rainy River
- Rapid River (Delta/Marquette counties)
- Rapid River (Kalkaska County)
- Rapid River (Ontonagon County)
- Ravine River
- Red Cedar River
- Rifle River
- River Raisin
- River Rouge or Rouge River
- River Styx (Gratiot County)
- River Styx (Marquette County)
- Rock River (Alger County)
- Rock River (Baraga County)
- Rock River (Mackinaw County)
- Rocky River
- Rogue River
- Ruby Creek

=== S–Z ===
- Saganing River
- Sage River
- Saginaw River
- Saint Clair River
- St. Joseph River (Lake Michigan)
- St. Marys River
- Saline River
- Salmon Trout River (Houghton County)
- Salmon Trout River (Marquette County)
- Salt River (Macomb County)
- Salt River (Midland/Isabella counties)
- Sand River
- Sandy Creek
- Sante River
- Sauk River
- Sebewaing River
- Second River
- Shakey River
- Shelldrake River
- Shiawassee River
- Shoepac River
- Silver River (Baraga County), drains to Lake Superior
- Silver River (Baraga–Houghton counties), drains to Sturgeon River
- Silver River (Keweenaw County), drains to Lake Superior
- Siskiwit River
- Slate River (Baraga County)
- Slate River (Gogebic County)
- Snake River
- South Branch Little Sugar River
- Spruce River
- Spurr River
- Stout Creek
- Sturgeon River (Alger/Delta counties)
- Sturgeon River (Baraga/Houghton counties)
- Sturgeon River (Cheboygan/Otsego counties)
- Sturgeon River (Dickinson County)
- Sucker River
- Sugar River
- Swan River
- Swartz Creek
- Sycamore Creek
- Tacoosh River
- Tahquamenon River
- Talmadge Creek
- Tamarack River
- Tawas River
- Thornapple River
- Thunder Bay River
- Tioga River
- Tittabawassee River
- Tobacco River (Keweenaw County, Michigan)
- Tobacco River (Tittabawassee River)
- Torch River
- Trap Rock River
- Traverse River
- Trout Creek
- Trout River
- Two Hearted River
- Union River
- Upper Millecoquins River
- Vermilac River
- Waiska River
- Walker Creek
- Walton River
- West Branch St. Joseph River
- West Sleeping River
- White River (Huron County)
- White River (Muskegon/Oceana counties)
- Whitefish River
- Yellow Dog River

== By watershed ==
=== Lake Erie basin ===
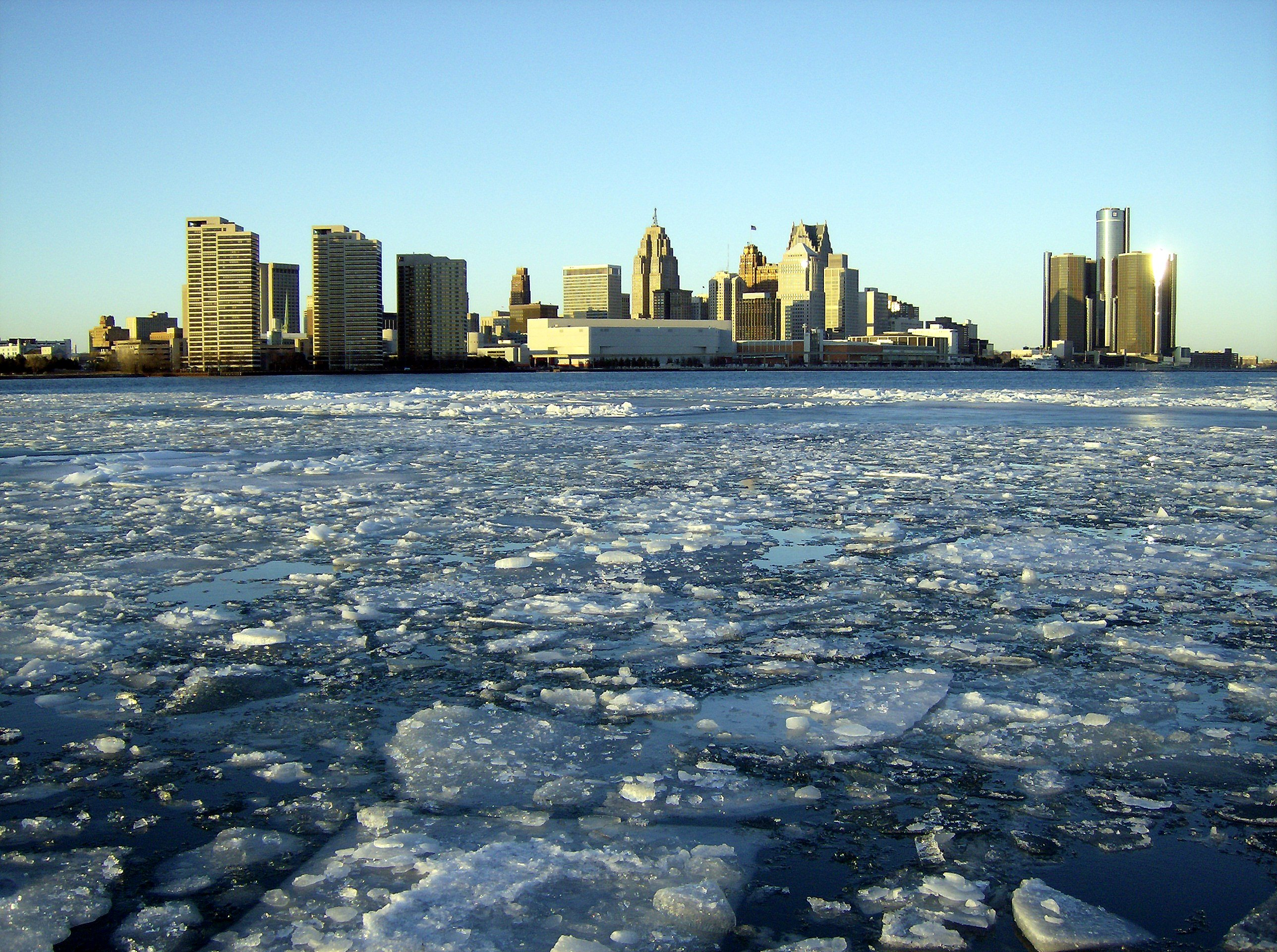
Detroit River

- Maumee River (OH)
  - Tiffin River (OH)
    - Bean Creek
  - St. Joseph River (OH)
    - East Branch Saint Joseph River
    - West Branch Saint Joseph River
- Ottawa River
- Little Lake Creek
  - Flat Creek
    - North River
- River Raisin
  - Saline River
  - Little River Raisin
  - Goose Creek
- Sandy Creek
- Huron River (Monroe/Wayne/Washtenaw/Livingston/Oakland counties)
  - Portage River (Livingston/Washtenaw counties)
- Detroit River
  - Ecorse River
  - River Rouge or Rouge River

=== Lake St. Clair basin ===
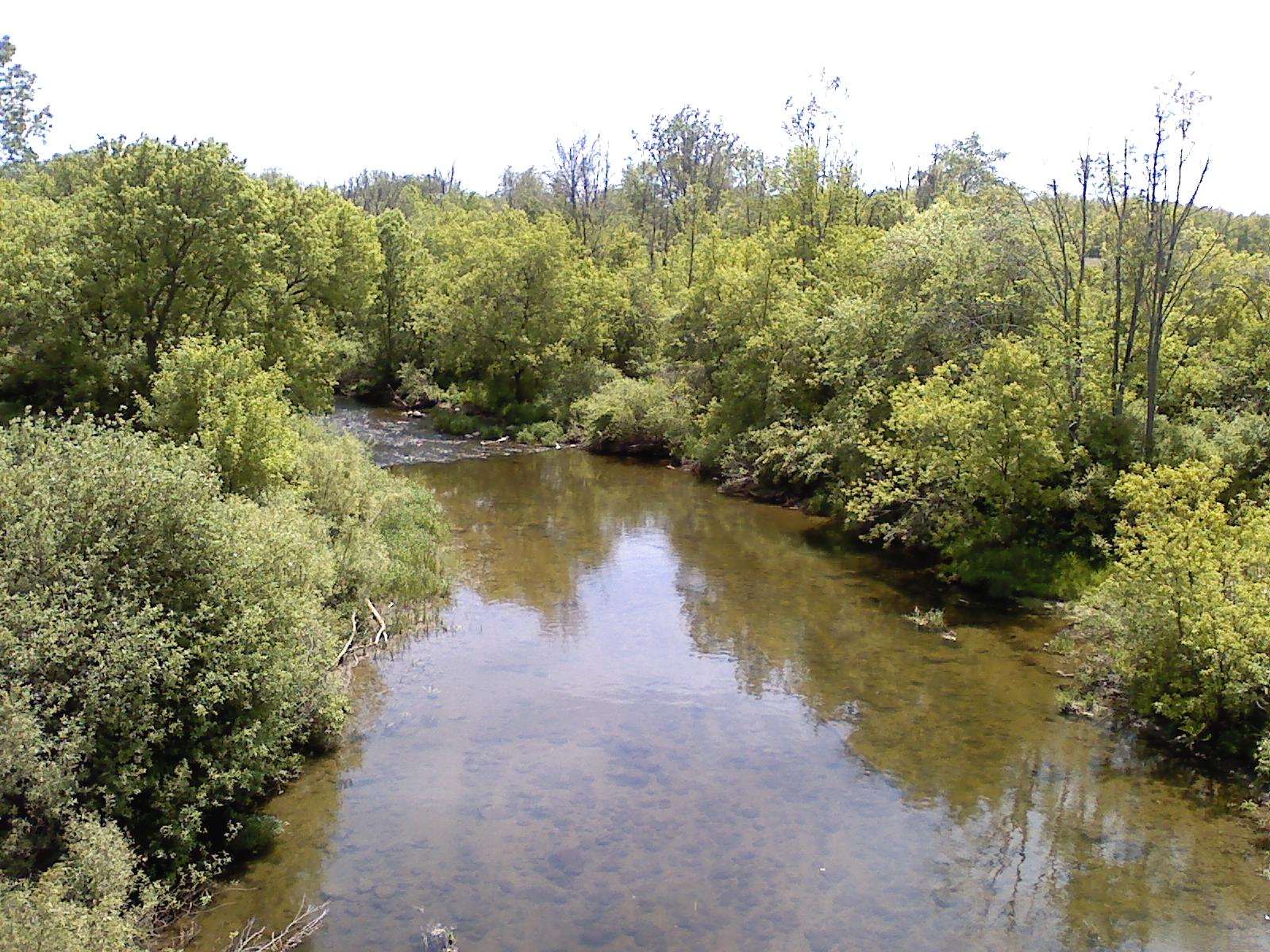
Clinton River

- Milk River
- Clinton River
  - Paint Creek
    - Trout Creek
- Salt River (Macomb County)
- Saint Clair River
  - Belle River
  - Pine River (St. Clair County)
  - Black River (Sanilac/St. Clair counties)

=== Lake Huron basin ===
==== The Thumb ====
- White River (Huron County, Michigan)
- New River
- Pinnebog River
- Pigeon River (Huron County)
  - Little Pigeon River (Huron County)

==== Saginaw Bay ====
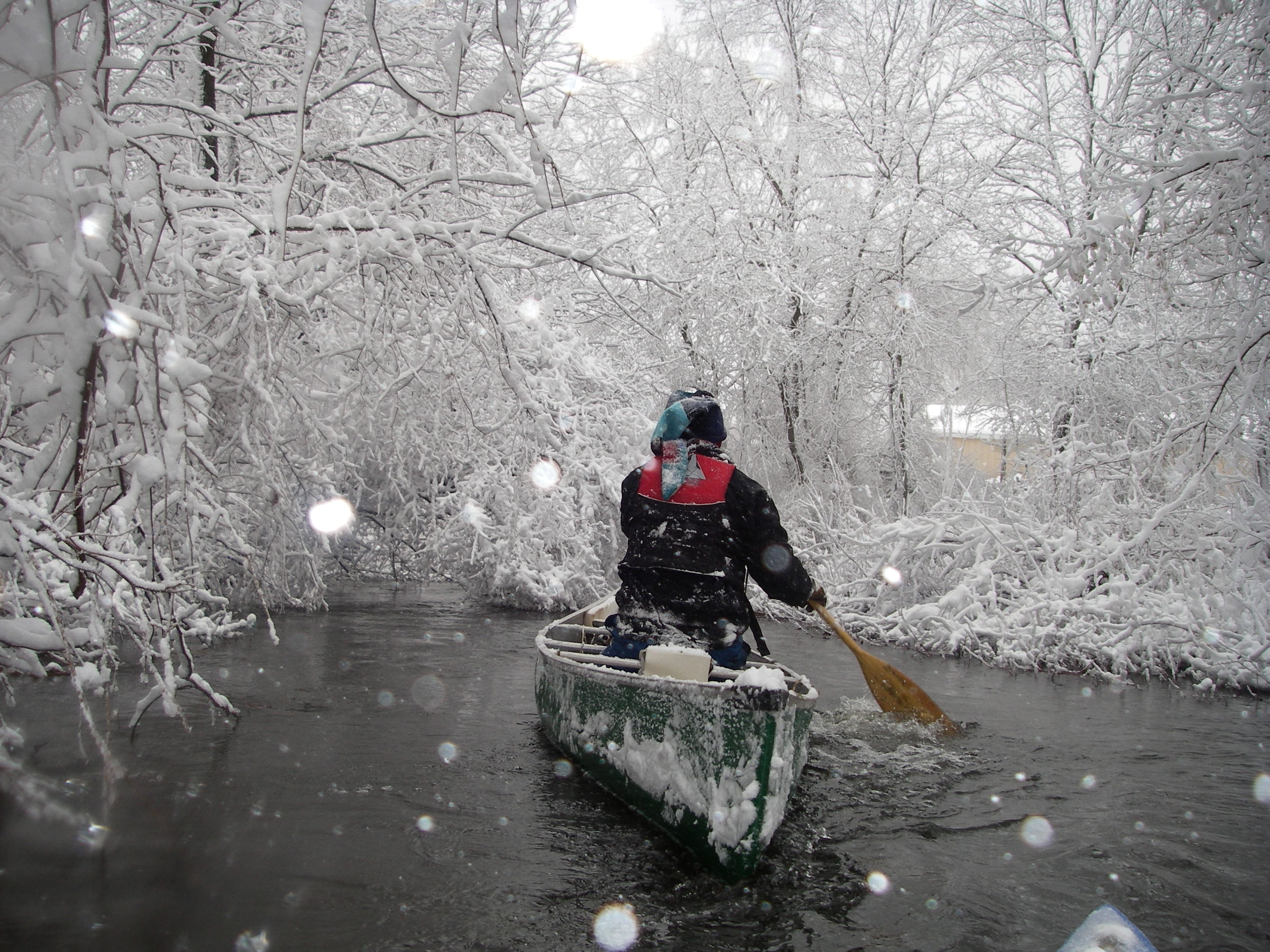
Shiawassee River

- Sebewaing River
- Quanicassee River
- Saginaw River
  - Shiawassee River
    - Cass River
    - Flint River
      - Misteguay Creek
      - Swartz Creek
    - Bad River
  - Tittabawassee River
    - Chippewa River
      - Pine River (Mecosta/Isabella/Montcalm/Gratiot/Midland counties)
      - Coldwater River (Isabella County)
        - Walker Creek
    - Salt River (Midland/Isabella counties)
    - Tobacco River
      - Little Cedar River (Gladwin County)
      - Cedar River (Clare/Gladwin counties)
    - Molasses River
      - Little Molasses River
    - Little Tobacco River
    - Sugar River
      - South Branch Little Sugar River
- Kawkawlin River
- Pinconning River
- Saganing River
- Pine River
- Rifle River
- Au Gres River
- Tawas River

==== Northeast Lower Peninsula of Michigan ====
- Au Sable River
  - Pine River (Alcona County)
- Black River (Alcona County)
- Devils River
- Thunder Bay River
- Bell River
- Little Trout River
- Swan River
- Trout River
- Ocqueoc River
  - Little Ocqueoc River
- Black Mallard River
- Cheboygan River, mouth at Cheboygan in Cheboygan County
  - Black River (Cheboygan/Montmorency/Presque Isle/Otsego counties)
    - Rainy River
      - Little Rainy River
    - Canada Creek
  - Mullett Lake
    - Little Pigeon River (Cheboygan County), empties directly into Mullett Lake
    - Pigeon River (Cheboygan/Otsego counties)
      - Little Pigeon River (Cheboygan County)
    - Indian River (Cheboygan County)
      - Little Sturgeon River
      - Burt Lake
        - Sturgeon River (Cheboygan/Otsego counties)
        - Crooked River
        - Maple River (Cheboygan/Emmett counties)
        - Little Carp River (Cheboygan County)
- Little Black River (Cheboygan County)

==== Upper Peninsula of Michigan ====
- Carp River (Chippewa/Mackinac counties)
- Pine River (Chippewa/Mackinac counties)
- Potagannissing River (Drummond Island)
- Saint Mary's River
  - Gogomain River
  - Munuscong River
  - Little Munuscong River
  - Charlotte River
  - Waiska River

=== Lake Michigan basin ===
==== Lower Peninsula of Michigan ====
===== Northern Michigan =====
- Carp Lake River
- Bear River
- Pine River (Charlevoix County)
  - Lake Charlevoix
    - Jordan River
      - Green River
    - Boyne River
- Grand Traverse Bay
  - Elk River
    - Elk Lake
      - Torch River
        - Rapid River (Kalkaska County, Michigan)
          - Little Rapid River
        - Torch Lake (Antrim County, Michigan)
          - Clam Lake
            - Grass River
              - Lake Bellaire
                - Intermediate River
                  - Cedar River (Antrim County, Michigan)
                  - Intermediate Lake
                    - Green River
                      - Sixmile Lake and other lakes
                        - Dingman River
                          - Intermediate River
  - Boardman River
    - Boardman Lake
- Leland River, also called the Carp River
- Crystal River
- Platte River
- Betsie River
  - Little Betsie River
- Manistee River
  - Manistee Lake
    - Little Manistee River
  - Pine River (Lake/Manistee/Osceola/Wexford counties), also called South Branch of Manistee River

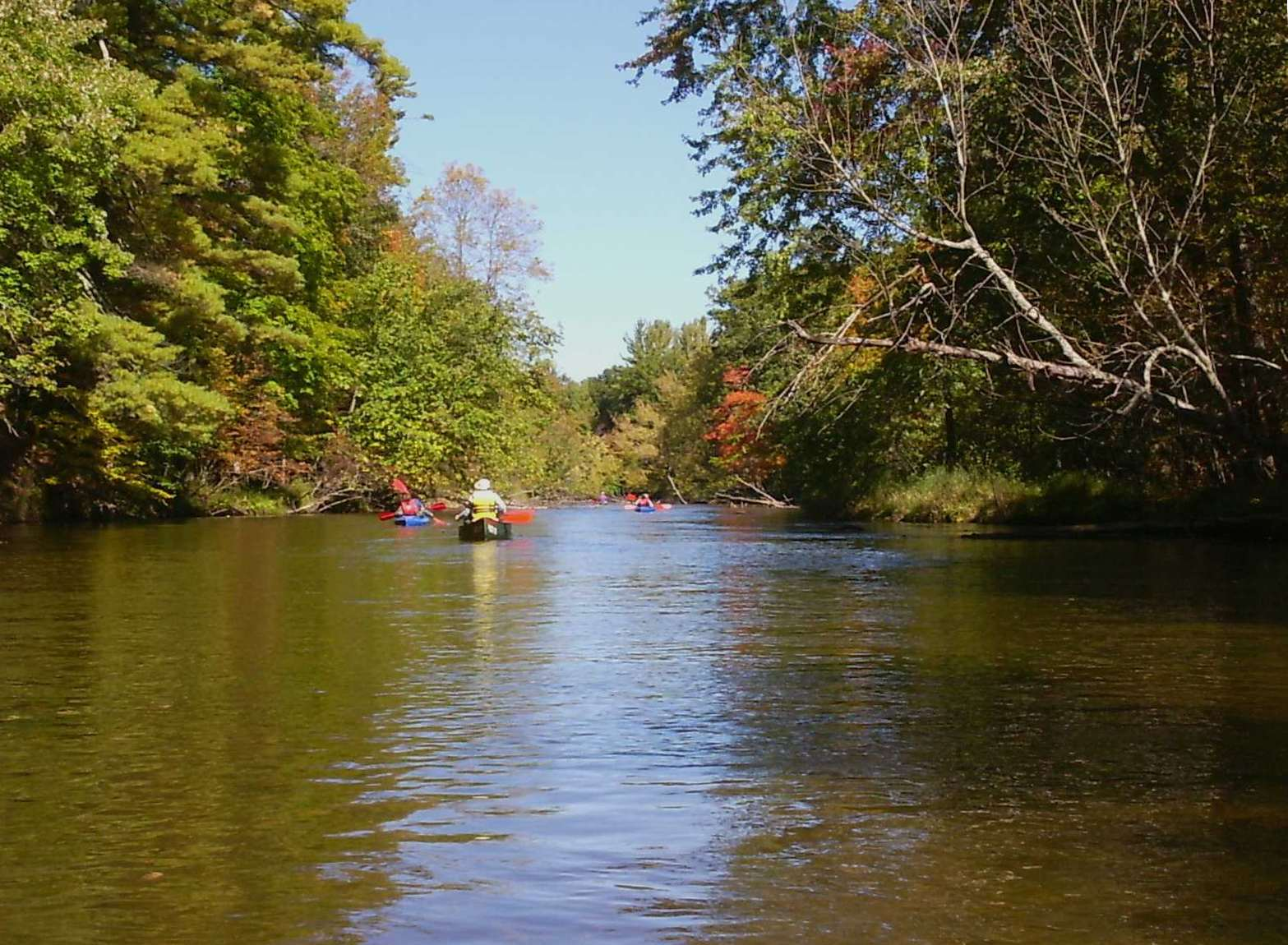
Pere Marquette River

- Big Sable River
- Lincoln River
- Pere Marquette River
  - Big South Branch Pere Marquette River
    - Ruby Creek
  - Baldwin River
- Pentwater River (Oceana County)

===== West Michigan =====
- White River (Muskegon/Oceana counties)
- Muskegon River
  - Maple River (Newaygo/Muskegon counties)
  - Little Muskegon River
  - Hersey River
  - Middle Branch River
  - Clam River

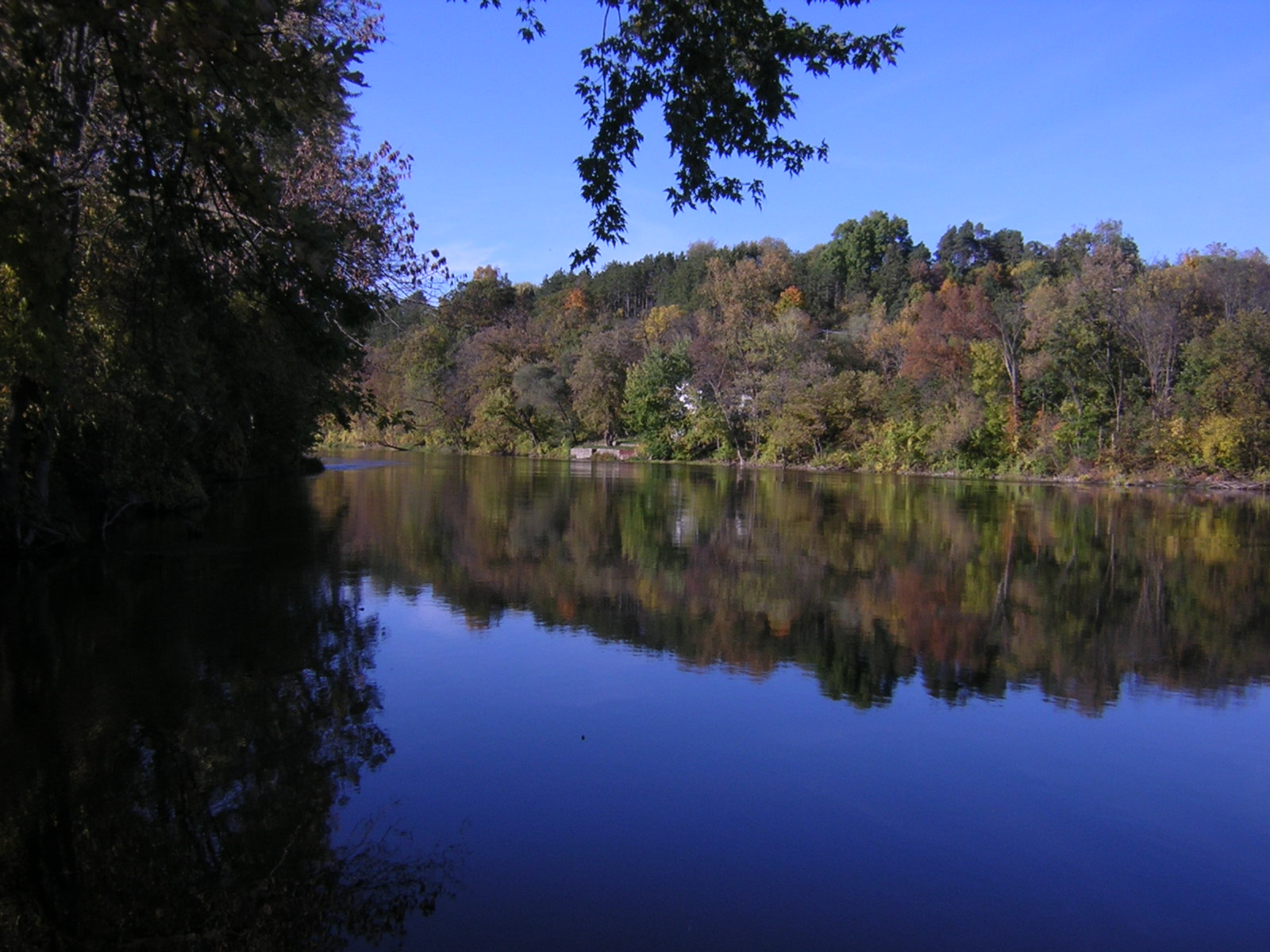
Grand River

- Grand River
  - Bass River
  - Buck Creek
  - Plaster Creek
  - Coldbrook Creek
  - Rogue River
  - Thornapple River
    - Coldwater River (Barry/Kent/Ionia counties)
      - Little Thornapple River, in Barry County
    - Little Thornapple River (Eaton County)
  - Flat River
  - Maple River (Ionia/Clinton/Gratiot/Shiawassee counties)
    - Pine Creek, some portions called Newark and Arcadia Drain
      - River Styx (Gratiot County)
    - Little Maple River
  - Looking Glass River
  - Red Cedar River
    - Sycamore Creek
  - Portage River (Jackson/Washtenaw counties)
- Pigeon River (Ottawa County)
- Lake Macatawa
  - Macatawa River
- Kalamazoo River
  - Rabbit River
    - Little Rabbit River
  - Gun River
  - Battle Creek River
- Black River (Allegan/Van Buren counties)
- St. Joseph River (Lake Michigan)
  - Paw Paw River
  - Dowagiac River
  - Pigeon River (St. Joseph County)
  - Fawn River
    - Little Fawn River
  - Prairie River
  - Rocky River
  - Portage River (Kalamazoo/St. Joseph counties)
  - Nottawa Creek (also known as Nottawa River)
  - Coldwater River (Branch County)
    - Sauk River
- Galien River
  - South Branch Galien River
    - Galena River

==== Upper Peninsula of Michigan ====
===== Green Bay =====
- Menominee River
  - Little River
  - Little Cedar River
  - Shakey River
  - Sturgeon River (Dickinson County, Michigan)
  - Brule River
    - Paint River
      - Hemlock River
        - Little Hemlock River
      - Net River
    - Iron River (Iron County, Michigan)
  - Michigamme River
    - Kelso River
    - Deer River
    - Fence River
      - Mitchigan River
    - Spruce River
    - Peshekee River
    - Spurr River
- Cedar River (Menominee County, Michigan)
  - Walton River
- Bark River
- Ford River

Little Bay de Noc

- Escanaba River
  - Middle Branch Escanaba River
    - Black River (Marquette County)
    - Second River
  - East Branch Escanaba River
- Days River
- Tacoosh River
- Rapid River (Delta/Marquette counties)
- Whitefish River

Big Bay de Noc

- Big River
- Little River
- Ogontz River
- Sturgeon River (Alger/Delta counties)
- Fishdam River
- Little Fishdam River

===== Remainder of Lake Michigan/Upper Peninsula =====
- Manistique River
  - Indian River (Alger/Schoolcraft counties)
    - Little Indian River
  - West Branch Manistique River
    - Creighton River
  - Driggs River
  - Fox River
    - East Branch Fox River
    - Little Fox River
  - Manistique Lake
    - Shoepac River
- Milakokia River
- Cataract River
- Crow River
- Rock River (Lake Michigan)
- Lower Millecoquins River
  - Upper Millecoquins River
- Black River (Mackinac County)
- Cut River
- Brevoort River
  - Brevoort Lake
    - Little Brevoort River
- Pointe aux Chenes River
- Moran River

==== Beaver Island ====
- Jordan River

=== Lake Superior basin ===
- Tahquamenon River
  - Hendrie River
  - Sage River
- Shelldrake River
- Carp River (Luce County)
- Little Two Hearted River
- Two Hearted River
- Blind Sucker River
  - Dead Sucker River
- Sucker River
- Hurricane River
- Mosquito River
- Miners River
- Anna River
- Au Train River
- Rock River (Lake Superior)
- Laughing Whitefish River
- Sand River
- Chocolay River
- Carp River (Marquette County)
- Dead River
  - Little Dead River
- Little Garlic River
- Big Garlic River
- Iron River (Marquette County, Michigan)
  - Lake Independence
    - Yellow Dog River

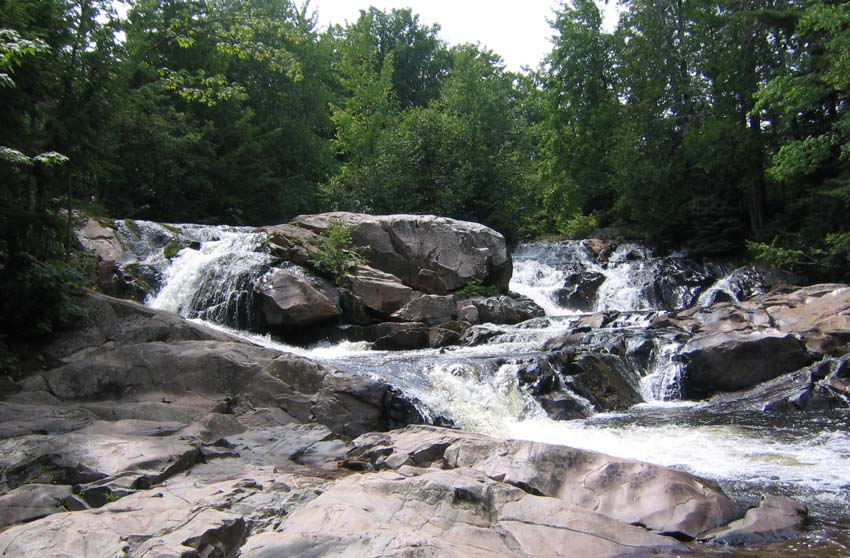
Yellow Dog River

- Salmon Trout River (Marquette County)
- Pine River (Marquette County)
  - Pine Lake
    - River Styx (Marquette County)
    - Mountain Stream
      - Mountain Lake
        - Cliff River
- Little Huron River
- Huron River (Baraga/Marquette counties)
- Huron Bay
  - Ravine River
  - Slate River (Baraga County)
  - Silver River (Baraga County)
- Falls River
- Little Carp River (Baraga County)
- Portage River (Houghton County, Michigan), the southern end of the Keweenaw Waterway
  - Snake River
  - Portage Lake
    - Sturgeon River (Baraga/Houghton counties)
      - Otter Lake
        - Otter River
          - West Branch Otter River
          - North Branch Otter River
            - Sante River
            - Little Otter River
      - Silver River (Baraga County/Houghton County)
      - Little Silver River
      - Perch River
      - Rock River (Sturgeon River tributary)
        - Worm Lake
          - Vermilac River
          - Murphy River
      - Tioga River
    - Pike River
    - Torch Lake
      - Trap Rock River
    - Pilgrim River
- Traverse River
- Tobacco River
- Big Betsy River
- Little Betsy River
- Lac La Belle
  - Little Gratiot River
- Montreal River (Keweenaw County)
  - Medora River
- Silver River (Keweenaw County)
- Eagle River
- Gratiot River
- Salmon Trout River (Houghton County)
- Graveraet River
- Elm River
- Little Elm River
- Misery River
  - Little Misery River
- East Sleeping River
- West Sleeping River
- Firesteel River
- Flintsteel River

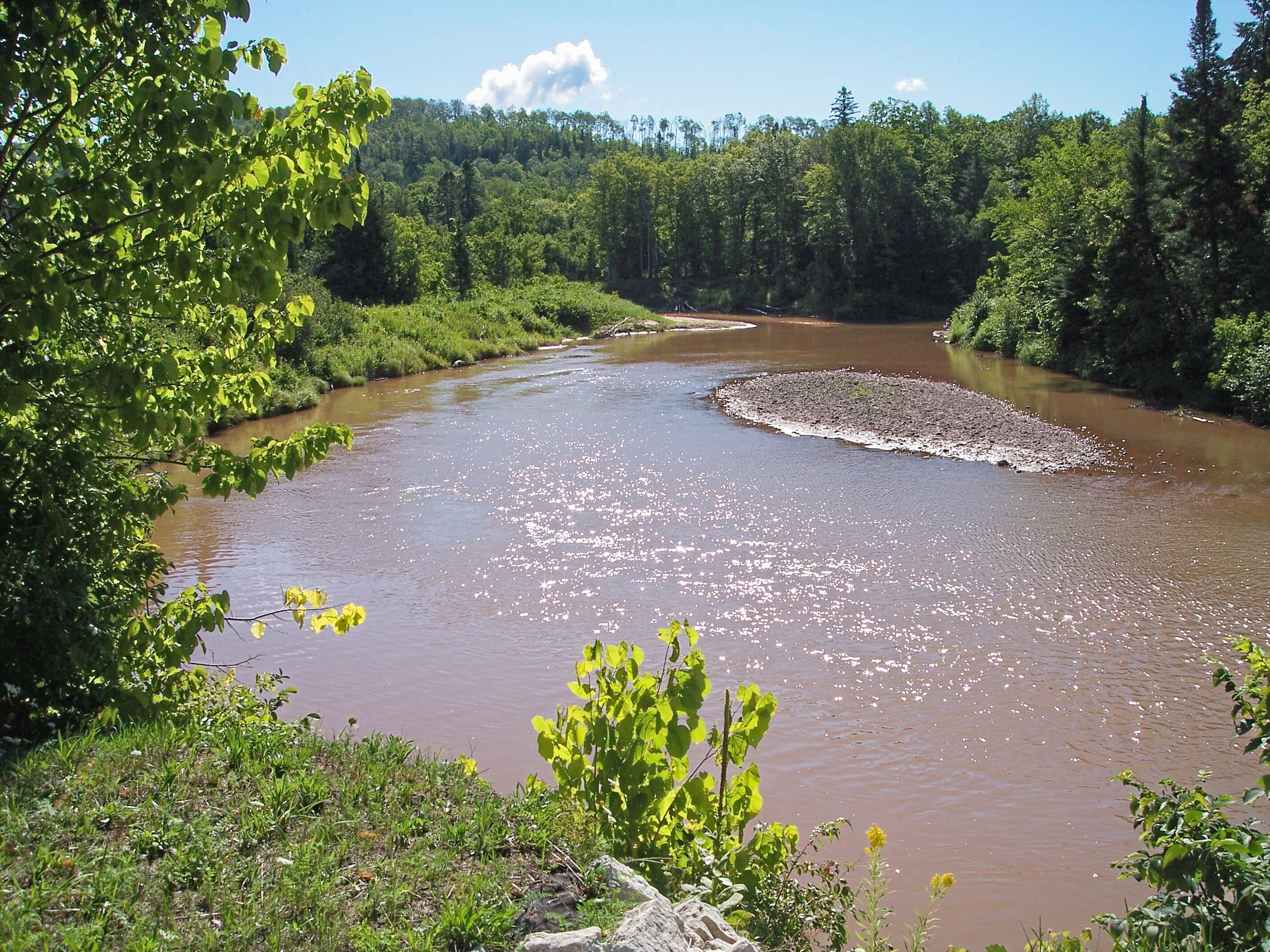
Ontonagon River

- Ontonagon River
  - West Branch Ontonagon River
    - South Branch Ontonagon River
    - Lake Gogebic
      - Slate River (Gogebic County)
        - Pelton River or Pelton Creek
  - Middle Branch Ontonagon River
    - Baltimore River
    - Tamarack River
  - East Branch Ontonagon River
    - Jumbo River
- Potato River
- Floodwood River
- Cranberry River
- Little Cranberry River
- Duck River, also called Duck Creek (Ontonogan County)
- Mineral River
- Big Iron River
  - Rapid River (Ontonagon County, Michigan)
- Little Iron River
- Union River
  - Little Union River
- Carp River (Gogebic/Ontonagon counties), sections also called Big Carp River and Upper Carp River
- Little Carp River (Gogebic-Ontonagon counties)
- Presque Isle River
  - Little Presque Isle River
- Black River (Gogebic County)
  - Little Black River (Gogebic County)
- Montreal River (Wisconsin-Michigan) (Gogebic County)

==== Isle Royale ====
- Big Siskiwit River
- Little Siskiwit River
- Siskiwit River

== See also ==
- List of rivers of the Americas
- Lists of rivers
- Elk River Chain of Lakes Watershed
- Inland Waterway (Michigan)
- List of rivers in the United States
