= Little Elm River =

Location
- Country: United States

Physical characteristics
- Source
  - location: Michigan
- Mouth
  - location: 47°02′11″N 88°55′44″W

The Little Elm River is a 10.1-mile-long (16.3 km) river in western Houghton County on the Upper Peninsula of Michigan in the United States. It is a tributary of Lake Superior, flowing into it southwest of the Elm River.

== See also ==
- List of rivers of Michigan
