= River Styx (Michigan) =

There are two rivers named the River Styx in the U.S. state of Michigan:

- River Styx (Gratiot County, Michigan)
- River Styx (Marquette County, Michigan)
