= Rapid River (Ontonagon County, Michigan) =

Location
- Country: USA
- State: Michigan
- Region: Upper Peninsula
- County: Ontonagon County

Physical characteristics
- Source
  - location: Bergland Township, Ontonagon County, Michigan
  - coordinates: 46°36′51″N 89°42′54″W
- Mouth: Big Iron River
  - location: Bergland Township, Delta County, Michigan
  - coordinates: 46°37′56″N 89°39′3″W

The Rapid River is a 4.5-mile-long (7.2 km) river on the Upper Peninsula of the U.S. state of Michigan. It rises in Bergland Township and flows mostly east into the Big Iron River.

== See also ==
- List of rivers of Michigan
