= Dead Sucker River =

Location
- Country: United States

Physical characteristics
- Source
  - location: Michigan
- Mouth
  - location: 46°39′53″N 85°45′38″W

The Dead Sucker River is a 4.4-mile-long (7.1 km) tributary of the Blind Sucker River on the Upper Peninsula of Michigan in the United States. Via the Blind Sucker River, it is a tributary of Lake Superior.

== See also ==
- List of rivers of Michigan
