= Little Union River =

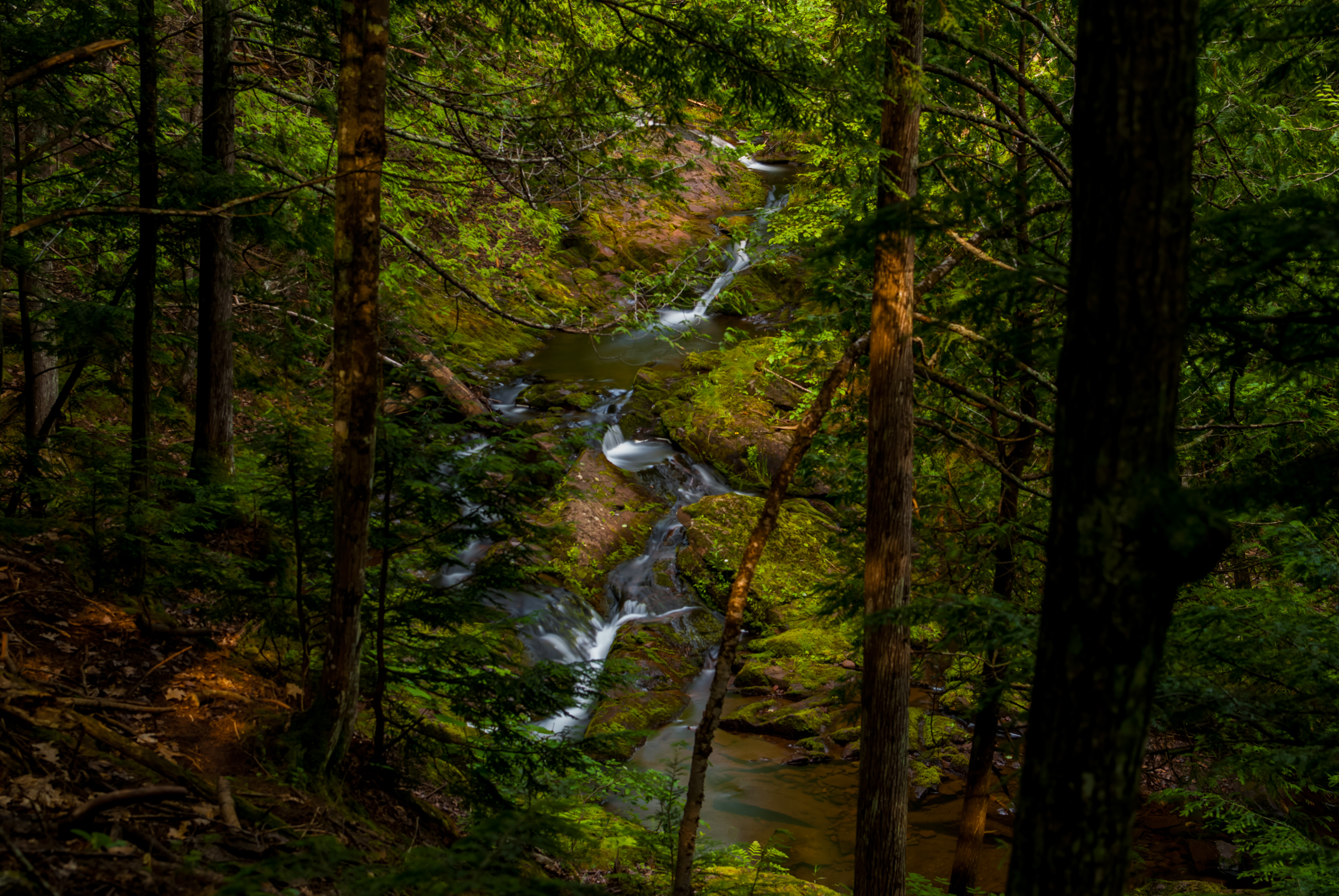
- A gorge on the Little Union River

Location
- Country: United States

Physical characteristics
- Source
  - location: Michigan
- Mouth
  - location: 46°47′53″N 89°37′05″W

The Little Union River is a 4.2-mile-long (6.8 km) river in Porcupine Mountains Wilderness State Park on the Upper Peninsula of Michigan in the United States. It is a tributary of the Union River, which flows to Lake Superior.

== See also ==
- List of rivers of Michigan
