= Little Hemlock River =

Location
- Country: United States

Physical characteristics
- Source
  - location: Michigan
- Mouth
  - location: 46°13′59″N 88°27′38″W

The Little Hemlock River is a 7.8-mile-long (12.6 km) river in Michigan. It is a tributary of the Hemlock River, flowing via the Paint River, Brule River, and Menominee River to Lake Michigan.

== See also ==
- List of rivers of Michigan
