= Partridge Creek =

Partridge Creek may refer to:

- Partridge Creek (Michigan), a stream in Marquette County
- Partridge Creek (Ontario), a creek in Hastings and Lennox & Addington counties

== See also ==
- The Mall at Partridge Creek, a shopping mall in Michigan
