= Swan River (Michigan) =

Location
- Country: United States

Physical characteristics
- Source
  - location: Presque Isle County, Michigan
  - coordinates: 45.3041°N 83.8399°W
- Mouth
  - location: Lake Huron, Michigan
  - coordinates: 45.3922°N 83.7349°W
- Length: 17.3 mi (27.8 km)

The Swan River is a 17.3-mile-long (27.8 km) river in Presque Isle County, Michigan. It originates in a swamp south of Belknap and east of Hawks. It flows generally northeast, between the Trout River and Little Trout River watersheds. The river enters the small Swan Lake, just southeast of Calcite limestone quarry, before reaching its mouth in Lake Huron, in a small bay between Adams Points and Quarry Point. The river is not navigable but provides a salmon habitat. It is annually stocked with hundreds of thousands of chinook salmon and in the 1980s was also stocked with coho salmon and lake trout.
