= Sante River =

Coordinates: 46°57′08″N 88°38′54″W

Location
- Country: United States

Physical characteristics
- Source
  - location: Michigan

The Sante River is an 8.7-mile-long (14.0 km) stream on the Upper Peninsula of Michigan in the United States. Via the North Branch Otter River, Otter River, Sturgeon River and Portage River, its waters flow to Lake Superior.

== See also ==
- List of rivers of Michigan
