= Little Silver River =

River in the United States of America

Location
- Country: United States

Physical characteristics
- Source
  - location: Michigan
- Mouth
  - location: 46°39′56″N 88°43′12″W
  - elevation: 239 meters (783 feet)

The Little Silver River is a 10.5 kilometer (6.5 miles) long tributary of the Sturgeon River in Houghton County on the Upper Peninsula of Michigan in the United States at an elevation of 239 meters (784 ft). Nearby rivers to the Little silver river include Silver River, Perch River and the West Branch Sturgeon River.

== See also ==
- List of rivers of Michigan
