= Ravine River =

Ravine River may refer to:

- Ravine River (Haiti)
- Ravine River (Michigan)
