= Little Rainy River =

Location
- Country: United States

Physical characteristics
- Source
  - location: Michigan
- Mouth
  - location: 45°20′26″N 84°09′10″W

The Little Rainy River is an 8.3-mile-long (13.4 km) tributary of the Rainy River in the northern part of the Lower Peninsula of Michigan. Via the Rainy River, the Black River, and the Cheboygan River, its waters flow to Lake Huron.

== See also ==
- List of rivers of Michigan
