= Little Rapid River (Michigan) =

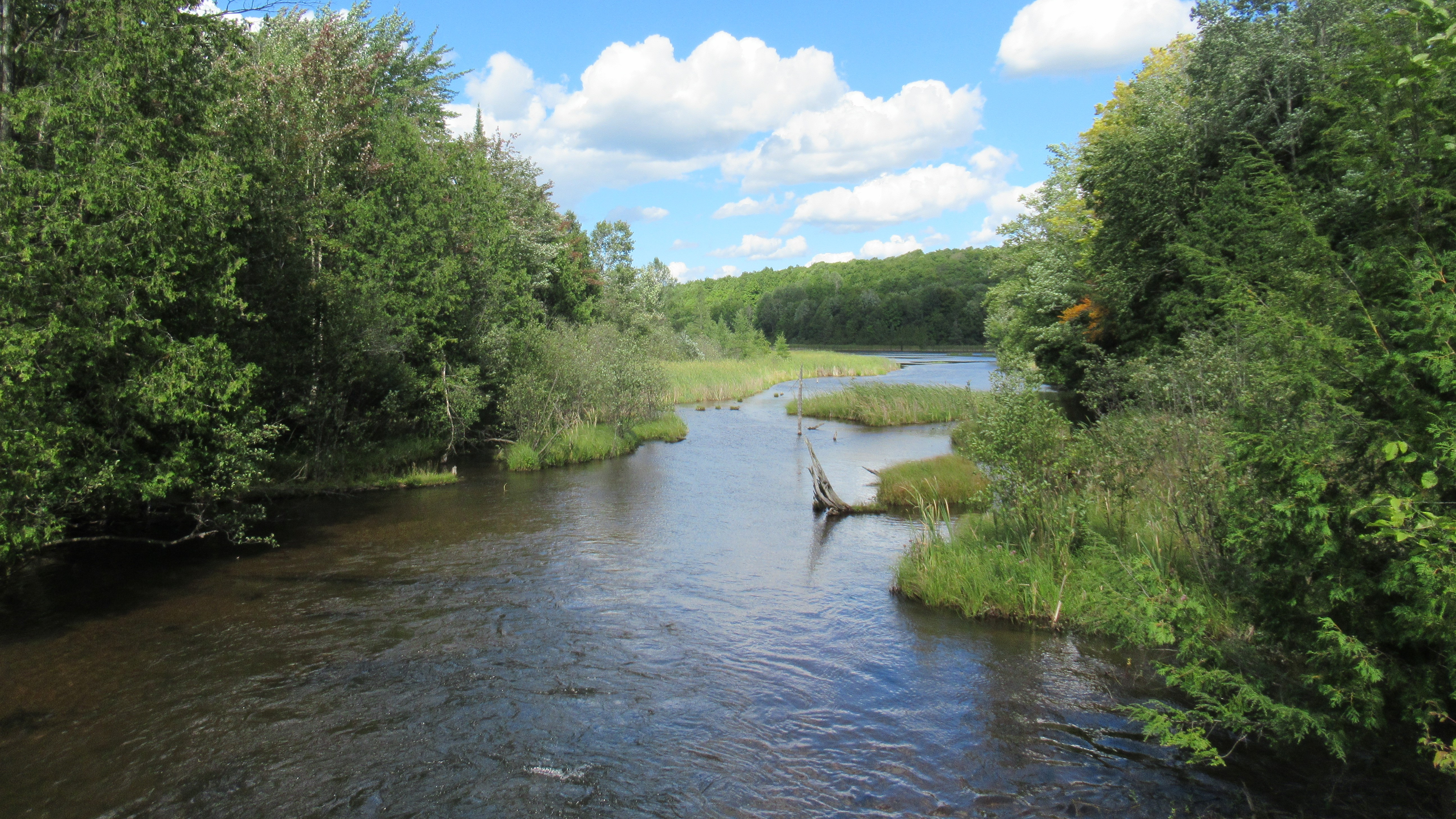
- View of the river from NW Hanson Road

- Location within the state of Michigan

Location
- Country: United States

Physical characteristics
- Source
  - location: Michigan
- Mouth
  - location: 44°45′00″N 85°12′22″W

The Little Rapid River is a 4.6-mile-long (7.4 km) stream in Kalkaska County, Michigan, in the United States. It is a tributary of the Rapid River, part of the Elk River Chain of Lakes Watershed flowing to Lake Michigan.

== See also ==
- List of rivers of Michigan
