= Potato River (Michigan) =

Location
- Country: United States

Physical characteristics
- Source
  - location: Michigan
- Mouth
  - location: 46°51′10″N 89°23′18″W

The Potato River is a 10.3-mile-long (16.6 km) river in Ontonagon County on the Upper Peninsula of Michigan in the United States. It is a tributary of Lake Superior.

== See also ==
- List of rivers of Michigan
