= Sand River (Michigan) =

Location
- Country: United States

Physical characteristics
- Source
  - location: Marquette County, Michigan
  - coordinates: 46.39883°N 87.139589°W
- Mouth: Lake Superior, Michigan
  - coordinates: 46.496325°N 87.106811°W

The Sand River is a 9.2-mile-long (14.8 km) tributary of Lake Superior on the Upper Peninsula of Michigan in the United States. For most of its course it flows through Escanaba River State Forest in the northeastern corner of Marquette County, then enters the northwestern corner of Alger County just before flowing into Lake Superior at the village of Sand River.

== See also ==
- List of rivers of Michigan
