= Little Dead River =

Location
- Country: United States

Physical characteristics
- Source
  - location: Michigan
- Mouth
  - location: 46°34′57″N 87°38′53″W

The Little Dead River is an 8.4-mile-long (13.5 km) tributary of the Dead River in Marquette County on the Upper Peninsula of Michigan in the United States. Via the Dead River, its waters flow to Lake Superior.

== See also ==
- List of rivers of Michigan
