= Tamarack River (Michigan) =

Location
- Country: United States
- State: Michigan

Physical characteristics
- Source
  - location: 46°14′52″N 88°59′04″W
  - elevation: 1634 ft
- Mouth
  - location: 46°18′20″N 89°02′58″W
  - elevation: 1552 ft

The Tamarack River is an 8.8-mile-long (14.2 km) tributary of the Middle Branch Ontonagon River in Iron and Gogebic counties on the Upper Peninsula of Michigan in the United States. The stream source is the outflow from Tamarack Lake. Via the Middle Branch of the Ontonagon River, its water flows north to the Ontonagon River and ultimately to Lake Superior.

== See also ==
- List of rivers of Michigan
