= Little Iron River =

Location
- Country: United States

Physical characteristics
- Source
  - location: Michigan
- Mouth
  - location: 46°49′40″N 89°35′19″W

The Little Iron River is a 17.9-mile-long (28.8 km) river in western Ontonagon County on the Upper Peninsula of Michigan in the United States. It is a tributary of Lake Superior.

== See also ==
- List of rivers of Michigan
