= West Sleeping River =

Coordinates: 46°59′08″N 89°04′50″W

Location
- Country: United States

Physical characteristics
- Source
  - location: Michigan

The West Sleeping River is an 8.5-mile-long (13.7 km) river in Ontonagon County, Michigan, in the United States. It is a tributary of Lake Superior.

== See also ==
- List of rivers of Michigan
