= Big Siskiwit River =

Location
- Country: United States

Physical characteristics
- Source
  - location: Michigan
- Mouth
  - location: 47°53′37″N 89°00′18″W
- Length: 13.0 km

The Big Siskiwit River is an 8.1-mile-long (13.0 km) river on Isle Royale in Lake Superior, in the U.S. state of Michigan. It flows west to east in the southern part of the island, entering Lake Superior at Siskiwit Bay.

== See also ==
- List of rivers of Michigan
