= Little Fox River =

Location
- Country: United States

Physical characteristics
- Source
  - location: Michigan
- Mouth
  - location: 46°25′10″N 86°03′48″W

The Little Fox River is an 11.2-mile-long (18.0 km) tributary of the Fox River on the Upper Peninsula of Michigan in the United States.

== See also ==
- List of rivers of Michigan
