= Little Garlic River =

Location
- Country: United States

Physical characteristics
- Source
  - location: Michigan
- Mouth
  - location: 46°40′35″N 87°31′30″W

The Little Garlic River is a 10.6-mile-long (17.1 km) tributary of Lake Superior in Marquette County on the Upper Peninsula of Michigan in the United States.

== See also ==
- List of rivers of Michigan
