= Little River Raisin =

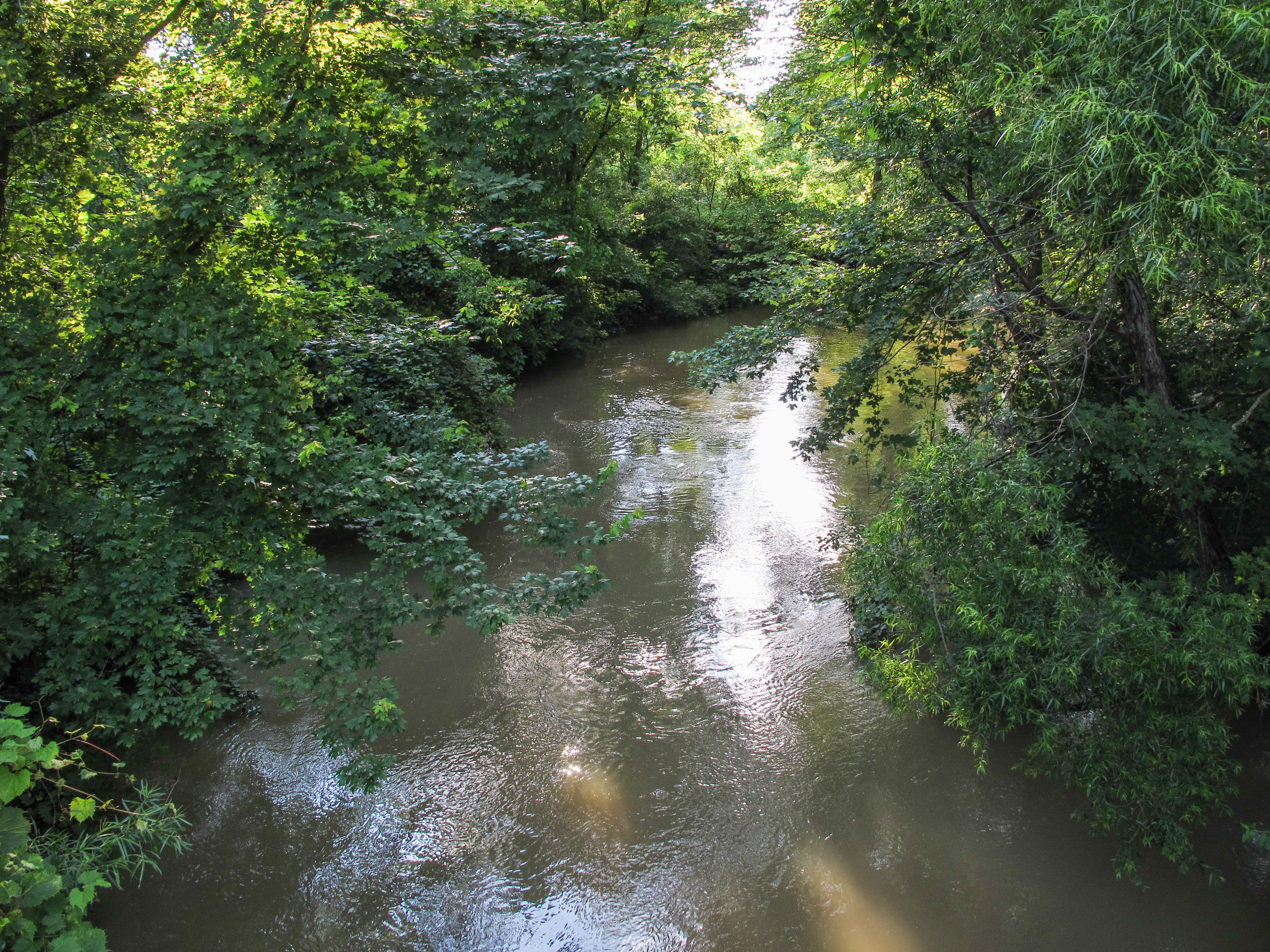
- The Little River Raisin in Dundee Township, near its mouth

Location
- Country: United States

Physical characteristics
- Source
  - location: Michigan
- Mouth
  - location: 41°56′41″N 83°40′50″W

The Little River Raisin is a 17.0-mile-long (27.4 km) tributary of the River Raisin in southeastern Michigan in the United States.

== See also ==
- List of rivers of Michigan
