= Mitchigan River =

The Mitchigan River is a 14.9-mile-long (24.0 km) stream in the Upper Peninsula of the U.S. state of Michigan. It flows into the Fence River at 46°17′27″N 88°09′58″W in northeast Iron County in Mansfield Township. The Fence River is a tributary of the Michigamme River, which is itself a tributary to the Menominee River, flowing to Lake Michigan. The Mitchigan River has its source in the southeast corner of Baraga County at 46°24′58″N 88°08′05″W. It flows mostly southward along the boundary between Iron and Marquette counties, crossing briefly into western Marquette County.

Named tributaries from the mouth include:

- Outflow from Little Chief Lake in Marquette County
  - Outflow from Chief Lake in Marquette County
    - Outflow from Springhole Lake in Marquette County
- Outflow from Bullhead Lake in Marquette County
- West Branch Mitchigan River, which rises at 46°25′30″N 88°09′00″W in southeast Baraga County
  - Leonard Creek, which rises in northeast Iron County at 46°23′10″N 88°09′13″W
