= Little Molasses River =

Location
- Country: United States

Physical characteristics
- Source
  - location: Michigan
- Mouth
  - location: 43°56′56″N 84°17′14″W

The Little Molasses River is an 11.4-mile-long (18.3 km) river in Gladwin County, Michigan, in the United States. It is a tributary of the Molasses River, which flows to the Tittabawassee River and is part of the Saginaw River watershed.

== See also ==
- List of rivers of Michigan
