= Little Presque Isle River =

Location
- Country: United States

Physical characteristics
- Source
  - location: Michigan
- Mouth
  - location: 46°29′58″N 89°46′28″W

The Little Presque Isle River is a 21.3-mile-long (34.3 km) tributary of the Presque Isle River on the Upper Peninsula of Michigan, flowing to Lake Superior.

== See also ==
- List of rivers of Michigan
