= Ogontz River =

Coordinates: 45°51′44″N 86°46′34″W

Location
- Country: United States

Physical characteristics
- Source
  - location: Michigan

The Ogontz River is a 5.3-mile-long (8.5 km) river on the Upper Peninsula of Michigan in the United States. It is a tributary of Ogontz Bay, an arm of Big Bay de Noc on Lake Michigan.

== See also ==
- List of rivers of Michigan
