= Little Cranberry River =

Location
- Country: United States

Physical characteristics
- Source
  - location: Michigan
- Mouth
  - location: 46°50′25″N 89°25′53″W

The Little Cranberry River is an 11.3-mile-long (18.2 km) river in Ontonagon County, on the Upper Peninsula of Michigan, in the United States. It is a tributary of Lake Superior.

== See also ==
- List of rivers of Michigan
