= Fishdam River =

Location
- Country: United States

Physical characteristics
- Source
  - location: Michigan
- Mouth
  - location: 45°53′54″N 86°34′45″W

The Fishdam River is a 21.5-mile-long (34.6 km) river on the Upper Peninsula of Michigan in the United States. It is a tributary of Big Bay de Noc on Lake Michigan.

== See also ==
- List of rivers of Michigan
