= Pointe aux Chenes River =

Location
- Country: United States

Physical characteristics
- Source
  - location: Michigan
- Mouth
  - location: 45°54′58″N 84°52′45″W

The Pointe aux Chenes River is a 6.2-mile-long (10.0 km) river on the Upper Peninsula of Michigan in the United States. It begins at the outlet of Round Lake and flows south in a winding course through the extensive Pointe aux Chenes Marshes to Lake Michigan.

== See also ==
- List of rivers of Michigan
