= Gun River =

Location
- Country: United States

Physical characteristics
- Source
  - location: Barry County, Michigan
  - coordinates: 42.5903°N 85.5408°W
- Mouth
  - location: Kalamazoo River, Michigan
  - coordinates: 42.4608°N 85.6808°W
- Length: 15.1 mi (24.3 km)

The Gun River is a 15.1-mile-long (24.3 km) tributary of the Kalamazoo River in Michigan, in the United States. It begins at the outlet of Gun Lake at the border between Allegan and Barry counties and flows southwest through Allegan County to its mouth at the Kalamazoo River just east of Otsego.

== See also ==
- List of rivers of Michigan
