= Gogomain River =

River in Michigan, United States

Location
- Country: United States
- State: Michigan
- County: Chippewa

Physical characteristics
- Source: Interior wetlands and springs
  - location: Chippewa County, Michigan, U.S.
- Mouth: Munuscong Lake (St. Marys River / Lake Huron)
  - location: Chippewa County, Michigan, U.S.

The Gogomain River is a low-gradient stream in Chippewa County on Michigan’s Upper Peninsula. It flows generally southeast through forest and wetland to enter Munuscong Lake, an embayment of the St. Marys River that forms part of Lake Huron.

== Course ==
Headwaters arise in interior peatlands and small springs south of M-48 in central Chippewa County. The river meanders southeast across the Munuscong Lake plain, gathering short tributaries and flowing through alder and cedar swales before entering Munuscong Lake along the St. Marys River system.

== See also ==
- St. Marys River (Michigan–Ontario)
- List of rivers of Michigan
