= Duck Creek (Michigan) =

Location
- Country: United States

Physical characteristics
- Source
  - location: Michigan
- Mouth
  - location: 46°50′15″N 89°28′16″W

The Duck Creek is a river in Ontonagon County, Michigan.

== See also ==
- List of rivers of Michigan
