= Little River (Menominee River tributary) =

Location
- Country: United States

Physical characteristics
- Source
  - location: Michigan
- Mouth
  - location: 45°08′03″N 87°40′03″W

The Little River is a 35.2-mile-long (56.6 km) tributary of the Menominee River on the Upper Peninsula of Michigan in the United States. It rises south of Stephenson and flows south to join the Menominee River 3 miles (5 km) upstream from the twin cities of Menominee, Michigan-Marinette, Wisconsin, on Lake Michigan.

== See also ==
- List of rivers of Michigan
