= East Sleeping River =

Coordinates: 46°59′13″N 89°04′08″W

Location
- Country: United States

Physical characteristics
- Source
  - location: Michigan

The East Sleeping River is a 21.3-mile-long (34.3 km) river in Ontonagon County, Michigan, in the United States. It is a tributary of Lake Superior.

== See also ==
- List of rivers of Michigan
