= New River (Michigan) =

Coordinates: 44°02′28″N 82°51′18″W

Location
- Country: United States

Physical characteristics
- Source
  - location: Michigan

The New River is a 14.7-mile-long (23.7 km) river in Huron County, Michigan. It flows north into Lake Huron, reaching the lake just west of Huron City.

== See also ==
- List of rivers of Michigan
