= Mosquito River (Michigan) =

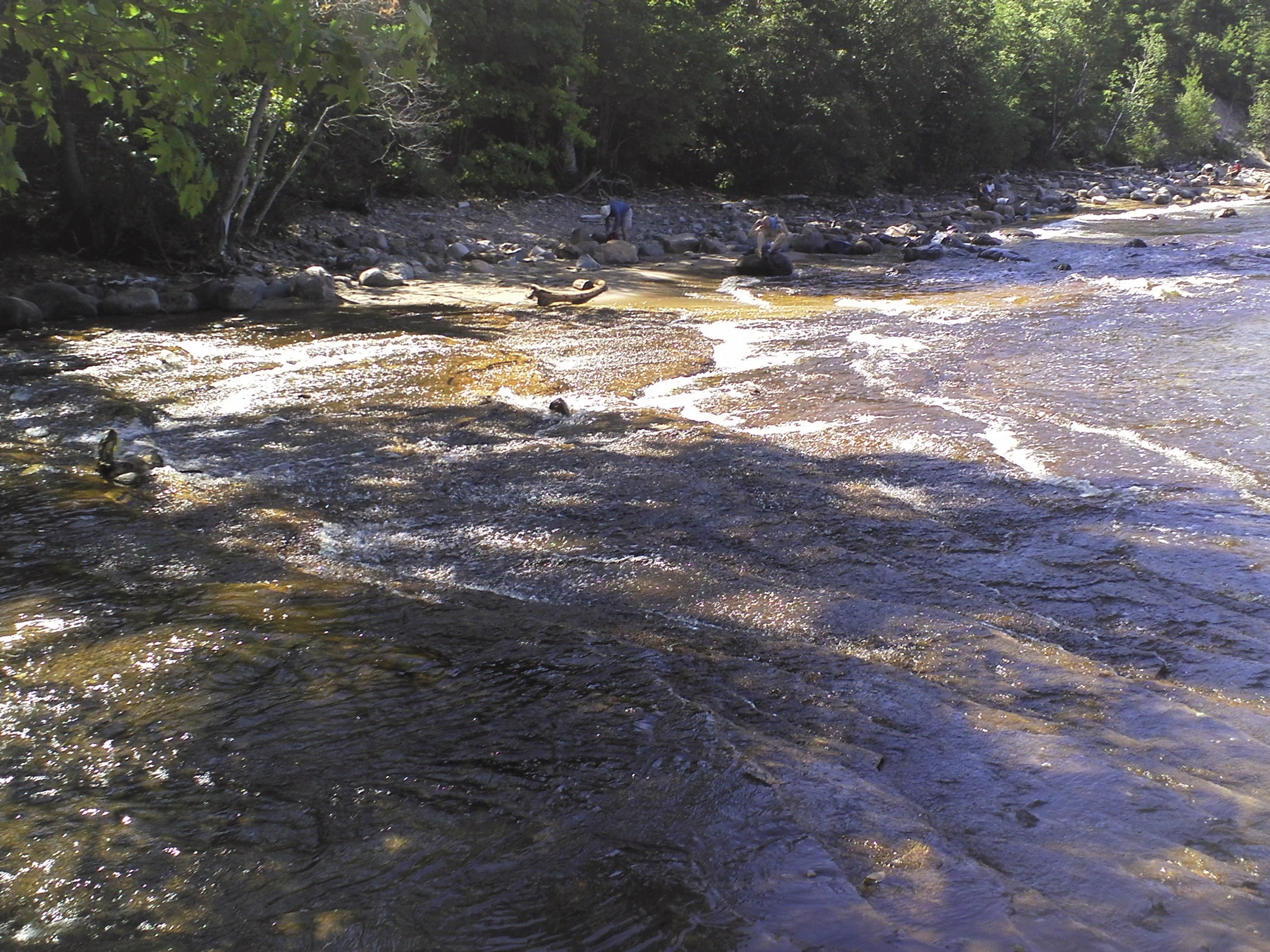

Location
- Country: United States

Physical characteristics
- Source
  - location: Alger County, Michigan
  - coordinates: 46.464°N 86.462°W
- Mouth
  - location: Lake Superior
  - coordinates: 46.526°N 86.495°W
- Length: 6.7 mi (10.8 km)

The Mosquito River is a 6.7-mile-long (10.8 km) stream in Alger County in the Upper Peninsula of Michigan, United States. It is a tributary of Lake Superior along the Pictured Rocks National Lakeshore.

== See also ==
- List of rivers of Michigan
