= Little River (Big Bay de Noc) =

Location
- Country: United States

Physical characteristics
- Source
  - location: Michigan
- Mouth
  - location: 45°50′13″N 86°47′18″W

The Little River is a 3.7-mile-long (6.0 km) river on the Upper Peninsula of Michigan in the United States. It is a tributary of Big Bay de Noc on Lake Michigan.

== See also ==
- List of rivers of Michigan
