= Big River (Michigan) =

Location
- Country: United States

Physical characteristics
- Source
  - location: Michigan
- Mouth
  - location: 45°49′54″N 86°47′17″W

The Big River is a 4.7-mile-long (7.6 km) stream on the Upper Peninsula of Michigan in the United States. It is a tributary of Big Bay de Noc on Lake Michigan.

== See also ==
- List of rivers of Michigan
