= Hendrie River =

Stream in Mackinac County, Upper Peninsula of Michigan

Location
- Country: United States
- State: Michigan
- County: Mackinac

Physical characteristics
- Source: Interior wetlands and springs
  - location: Mackinac County, Michigan, U.S.
- Mouth: Lake Michigan watershed
  - location: Mackinac County, Michigan, U.S.

The Hendrie River is a small stream in Mackinac County on Michigan’s Upper Peninsula. It flows through mixed forest, wetlands, and glacial lakeplain within the Lake Michigan drainage of the south-central county.

== Course ==
Headwaters arise in small springs and peatlands in Mackinac County. The river follows a gentle gradient across low-relief terrain and alder–cedar swales before joining downstream waters of the Lake Michigan basin.

=== Plants and wildlife ===
Upland forests include northern hardwoods (maple, birch, aspen) and conifers (white pine, hemlock, spruce–fir). Riparian corridors are characterized by alder thickets, cedar swamps, and sedge meadows. Cold- to cool-water fishes occupy spring-influenced reaches; warmer backwaters near the confluence support species typical of Lake Michigan tributaries in Mackinac County.

== See also ==
- List of rivers of Michigan
