= Dingman River =

Location
- Country: United States

Physical characteristics
- Source
  - location: Scotts Lake
  - coordinates: 45.07611°N 85.18222°W
- Mouth
  - location: Sixmile Lake, Michigan
  - coordinates: 45.10167°N 85.1995°W
- Length: 2.7 mi (4.3 km)

The Dingman River is the name for a portion of the Intermediate River in Antrim County, Michigan. The Dingman River flows 2.7 miles (4.3 km) from Scotts Lake northwest to Sixmile Lake, entirely within Echo Township. Via the Elk River Chain of Lakes, water from the Dingman River flows to Grand Traverse Bay on Lake Michigan.

== See also ==
- List of rivers of Michigan
