= Second River (Michigan) =

Coordinates: 46°30′25″N 87°54′41″W

Location
- Country: United States

Physical characteristics
- Source
  - location: Michigan

The Second River is a 6.3-mile-long (10.1 km) tributary of the Middle Branch Escanaba River in Michigan.

== See also ==
- List of rivers of Michigan
