= Sucker River =

Location
- Country: United States

Physical characteristics
- Source
  - location: Michigan
- Mouth
  - location: 46°40′26″N 85°56′34″W

The Sucker River is a 34.8-mile-long (56.0 km) river in eastern Alger County on the Upper Peninsula of Michigan in the United States. It rises at the outlet of Nawakwa Lake and flows generally north to Lake Superior east of Grand Marais.

== See also ==
- List of rivers of Michigan
