= Medora River =

Coordinates: 47°25′22″N 87°57′39″W

Location
- Country: United States

Physical characteristics
- Source
  - location: Michigan

The Medora River is a 2.1-mile-long (3.4 km) tributary of the Montreal River on the Keweenaw Peninsula of Michigan in the United States. It forms the outlet of Lake Medora.

== See also ==
- List of rivers of Michigan
