= Tioga River (Michigan) =

Location
- Country: United States

Physical characteristics
- Source
  - location: Michigan
- Mouth
  - location: 46°35′54″N 88°21′08″W

The Tioga River is a 16.8-mile-long (27.0 km) tributary of the Sturgeon River in Baraga County, Michigan, United States.

== See also ==
- List of rivers of Michigan
