= Crow River (Michigan) =

River in Michigan, United States

Location
- Country: United States

Physical characteristics
- Source
  - location: Michigan
- Mouth
  - location: 46°01′49″N 85°37′30″W

The Crow River is a 5.8-mile-long (9.3 km) river on the Upper Peninsula of Michigan in the United States, flowing to Lake Michigan.

== See also ==
- List of rivers of Michigan
