= Trout Creek (Michigan) =

Coordinates: 42°44′49″N 83°11′46″W

Trout Creek is a 6.5-mile-long (10.5 km) tributary of Paint Creek in Oakland County, Michigan, in the United States. Via Paint Creek and the Clinton River, it is a tributary of Lake St. Clair.

Trout Creek flows through the Bald Mountain Recreation Area and is one of two designated trout streams in Oakland County, the other being Paint Creek.

== See also ==
- List of rivers of Michigan
