= Little Fishdam River =

Location
- Country: United States

Physical characteristics
- Source
  - location: Michigan
- Mouth
  - location: 45°54′02″N 86°34′03″W

The Little Fishdam River is a 6.0-mile-long (9.7 km) stream on the Upper Peninsula of Michigan in the United States. It is a tributary of Big Bay de Noc on Lake Michigan.

== See also ==
- List of rivers of Michigan
