= Gratiot River =

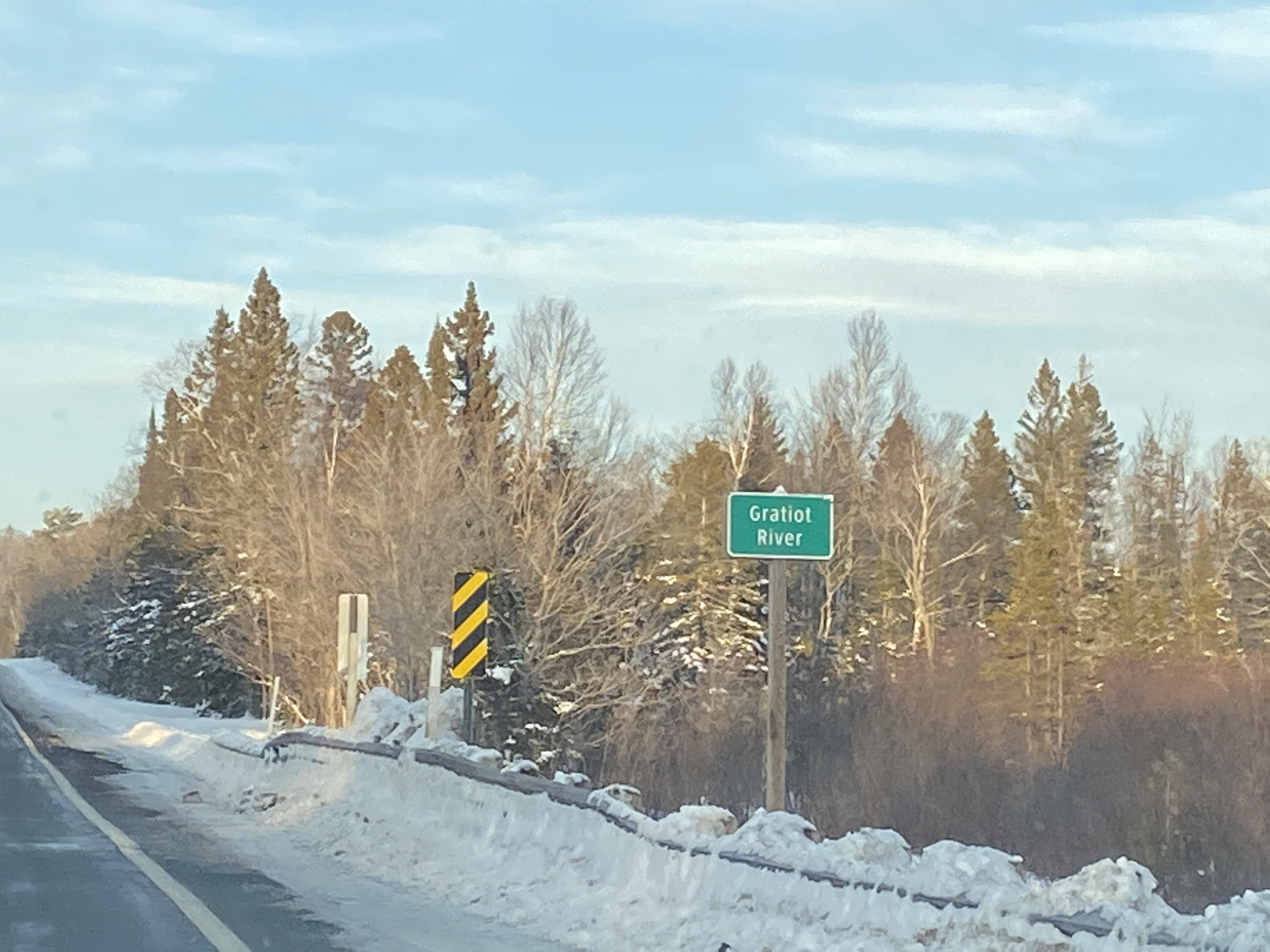
- Sign showing Gratiot River off of U.S. 41, north of Mohawk, Michigan.

- Location within Michigan Location within the United States

Location
- Country: United States
- State: Michigan

Physical characteristics
- Mouth
  - location: Lake Superior
  - coordinates: 47°20′38″N 88°27′09″W

The Gratiot River is a 15.0-mile-long (24.1 km) river on the north side of the Keweenaw Peninsula in Michigan. It is a tributary of Lake Superior.

== See also ==
- List of rivers of Michigan
