= Graveraet River =

Coordinates: 47°06′53″N 88°50′49″W

Location
- Country: United States

Physical characteristics
- Source
  - location: Michigan

The Graveraet River is an 8.7-mile-long (14.0 km) river in Houghton County on the Upper Peninsula of Michigan in the United States. It is a tributary of Lake Superior.

== See also ==
- List of rivers of Michigan
