= Cranberry River (Michigan) =

Location
- Country: United States

Physical characteristics
- Source
  - location: Michigan
- Mouth
  - location: 46°50′33″N 89°25′15″W

The Cranberry River is a 20.0-mile-long (32.2 km) river in Ontonagon County on the Upper Peninsula of Michigan in the United States. It is a tributary of Lake Superior.

== See also ==
- List of rivers of Michigan
