= Gook Creek =

Stream in Antrim County, Michigan, U.S.

Coordinates: 45°05′10″N 85°04′27″W

Gook Creek

Gook Creek is a stream in Antrim County, Michigan, in the United States. It is a tributary of the Jordan River with an elevation of 620 ft (189 m) above sea level.

Although gook is used as a common ethnic slur, the creek's name is widely accepted as being derived from a Native American language, although its specific etymology has not been identified.

== See also ==
- List of rivers of Michigan
