= Big Garlic River =

Location
- Country: United States

Physical characteristics
- Source
  - location: Ishpeming Township, Marquette County, Michigan
  - coordinates: 46.66437°N 87.6868°W
- Mouth
  - location: Lake Superior, Michigan
  - coordinates: 46.70687°N 87.57652°W
- Basin size: 30 mi^{2} (78 km^{2})

The Big Garlic River is a 14.4-mile-long (23.2 km) river in Marquette County, Michigan. It empties into Lake Superior.

== See also ==
- List of rivers of Michigan
