= Spruce River =

Coordinates: 46°27′31″N 88°04′21″W

Location
- Country: United States

Physical characteristics
- Source
  - location: Michigan

The Spruce River is a 9.9-mile-long (15.9 km) tributary of the Michigamme River on the Upper Peninsula of Michigan in the United States. Via the Michigamme River and the Menominee River, it is a tributary of Lake Michigan.

== See also ==
- List of rivers of Michigan
