= Choate Creek =

Stream in Ontonagon County, Michigan, U.S.

Coordinates: 46°27′04″N 89°17′26″W

Choate Creek is a stream in Ontonagon County, Michigan, in the United States.

Leander Choate was a large landowner in the area.

== See also ==
- List of rivers of Michigan
