= Big Betsy River =

Location
- Country: United States

Physical characteristics
- Source
  - location: Michigan
- Mouth
  - location: 47°17′50″N 88°03′25″W

The Big Betsy River is a 3.4-mile-long (5.5 km) stream on the Upper Peninsula of Michigan in the United States. It is a tributary of Lake Superior.

== See also ==
- List of rivers of Michigan
