= White River (Huron County, Michigan) =

Coordinates: 43°43′49″N 82°36′35″W

Location
- Country: United States

Physical characteristics
- Source
  - location: Michigan

The White River is a 12.1-mile-long (19.5 km) river in southern Huron County, Michigan. It is a tributary of Lake Huron.

== See also ==
- List of rivers of Michigan
