= Little Munuscong River =

Location
- Country: United States

Physical characteristics
- Source
  - location: Michigan
- Mouth
  - location: 46°12′47″N 84°15′08″W

The Little Munuscong River is a 16.2-mile-long (26.1 km) river that is situated by the Upper Peninsula of Michigan in the United States. It is a tributary of Munuscong Lake, which is part of the St. Marys River waterway and an arm of Lake Huron.

== See also ==
- List of rivers of Michigan
