= Snake River (Michigan) =

Coordinates: 47°01′02″N 88°28′13″W

Location
- Country: United States

Physical characteristics
- Source
  - location: Michigan

The Snake River is a 5.1-mile-long (8.2 km) tributary of the Portage River (Keweenaw Waterway) on the Upper Peninsula of Michigan in the United States. Via the Portage River, its water flows to Lake Superior.

== See also ==
- List of rivers of Michigan
