= Hurricane River =

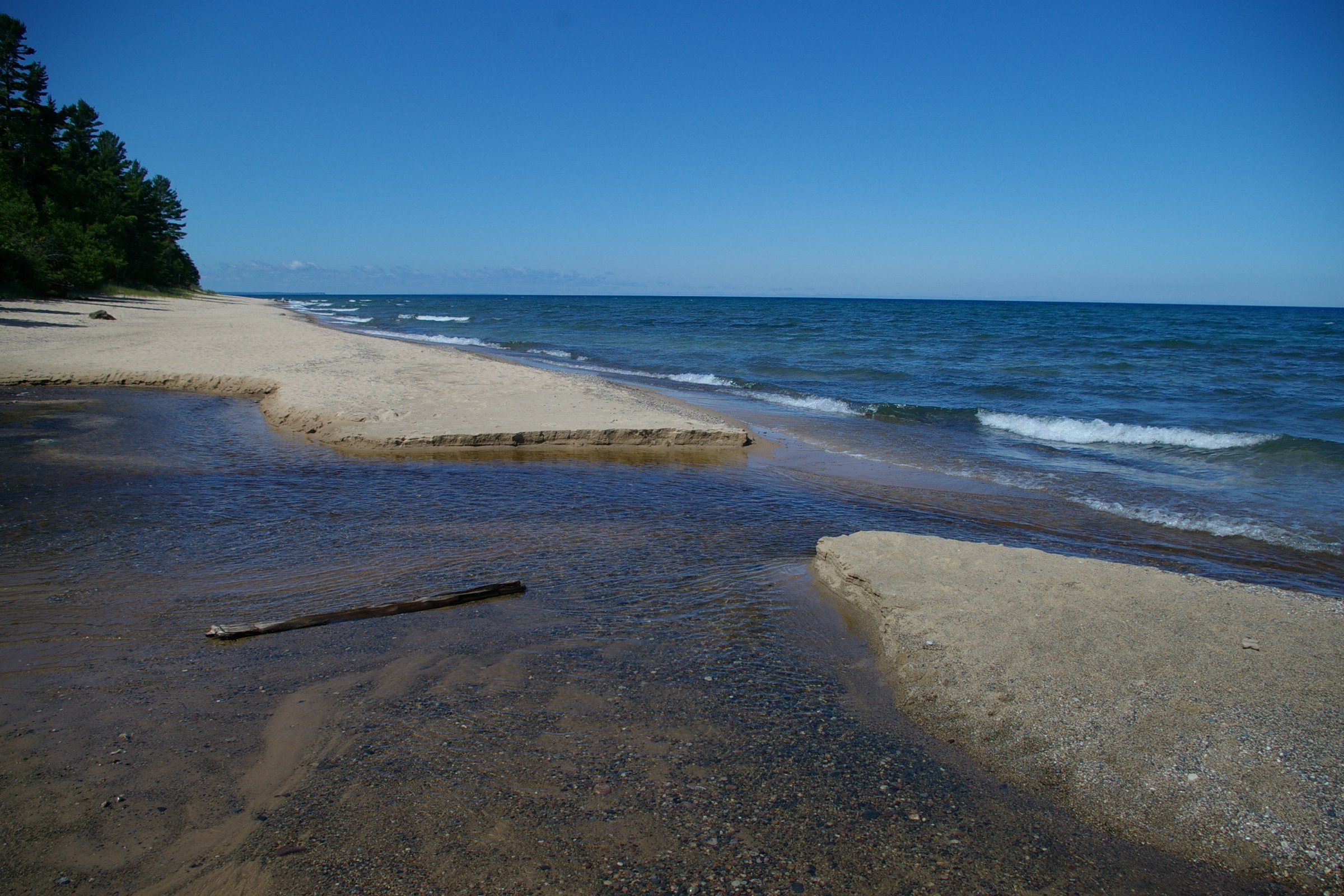
- Mouth of the Hurricane River at Lake Superior

Location
- Country: United States

Physical characteristics
- Source
  - location: Burt Township, Alger County, Michigan
  - coordinates: 46.60525°N 86.096°W
- Mouth
  - location: Lake Superior, Michigan
  - coordinates: 46.66607°N 86.16794°W
- Length: 6.4 mi (10.3 km)

The Hurricane River is a 6.4-mile-long (10.3 km) river in Alger County in the Upper Peninsula of Michigan in the United States. It empties into Lake Superior in the Pictured Rocks National Lakeshore. There is a campground at the mouth of the river which is also the beginning of a trail that leads past various old shipwrecks to the historic Au Sable Lighthouse. The mouth of the river is also very near the eastern end of a stretch of relatively straight shoreline known as Twelvemile Beach.

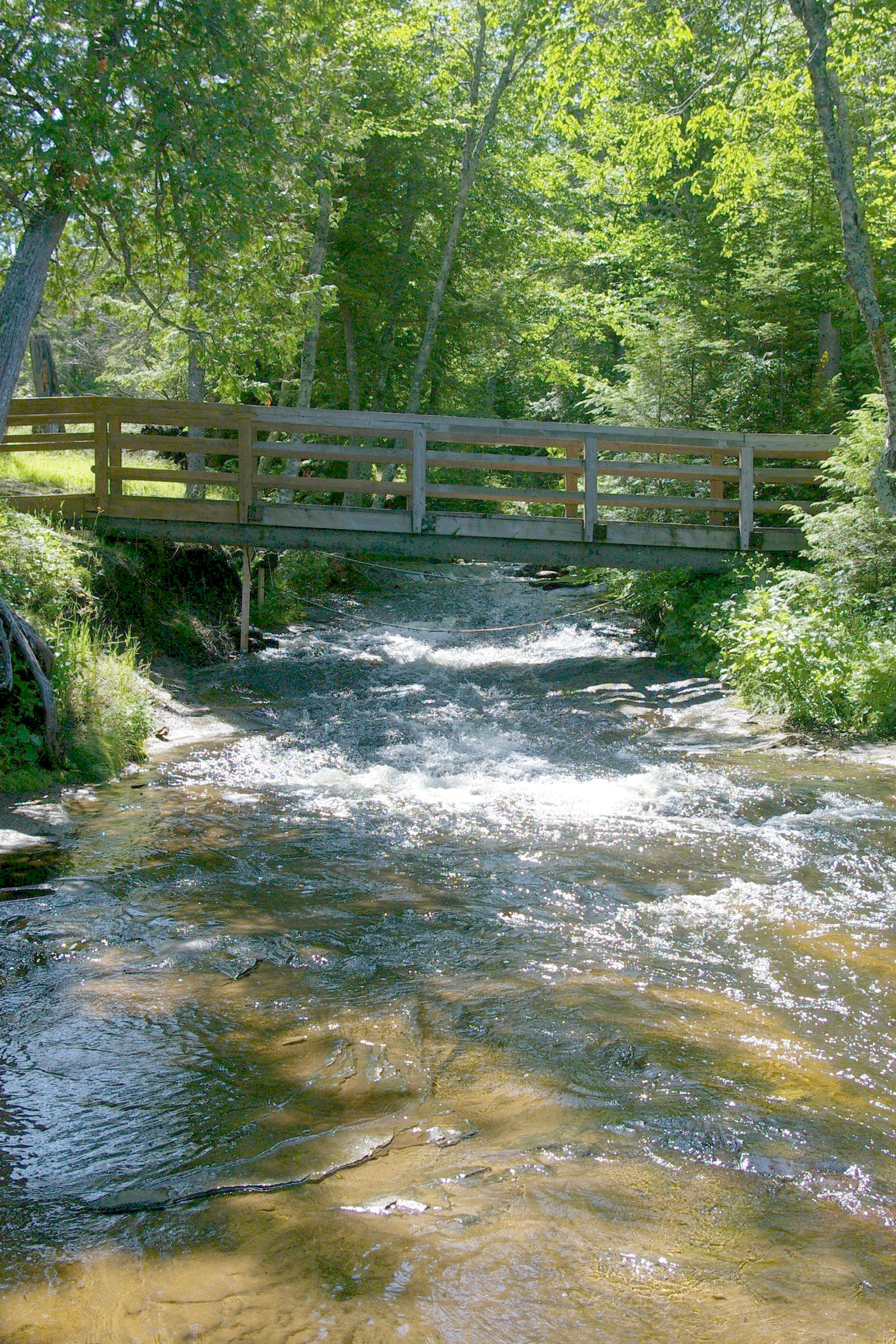
Hurricane River near the mouth

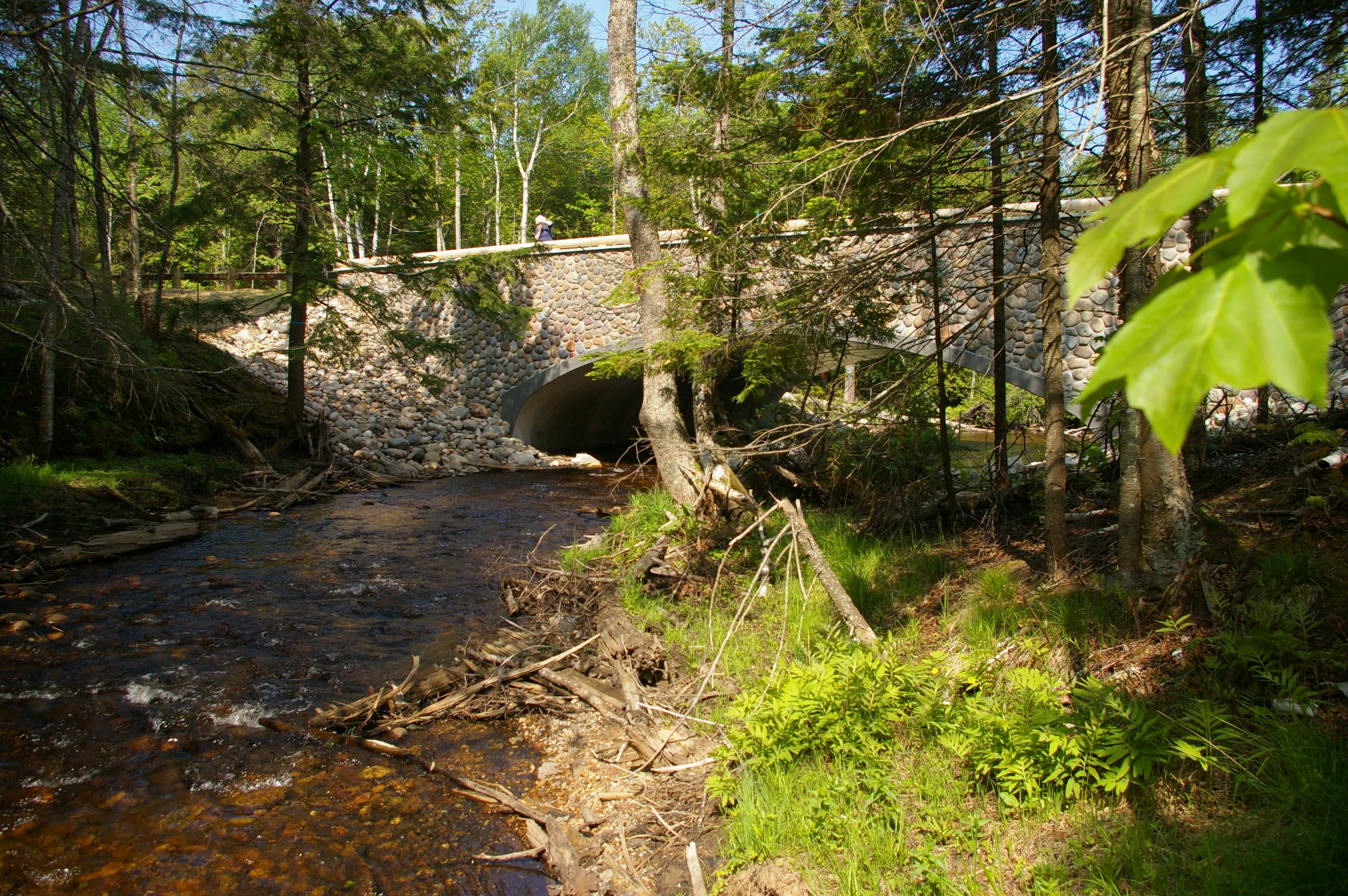
New Bridge on H-58 over the Hurricane river

Short Video of the mouth of the Hurricane River

== See also ==
- List of rivers of Michigan
