= Little Betsy River =

Location
- Country: United States

Physical characteristics
- Source
  - location: Michigan
- Mouth
  - location: 47°18′33″N 88°00′44″W

The Little Betsy River is a 2.1-mile-long (3.4 km) stream on the Upper Peninsula of Michigan in the United States. It is a tributary of Lake Superior.

== See also ==
- List of rivers of Michigan
