= Au Train River =

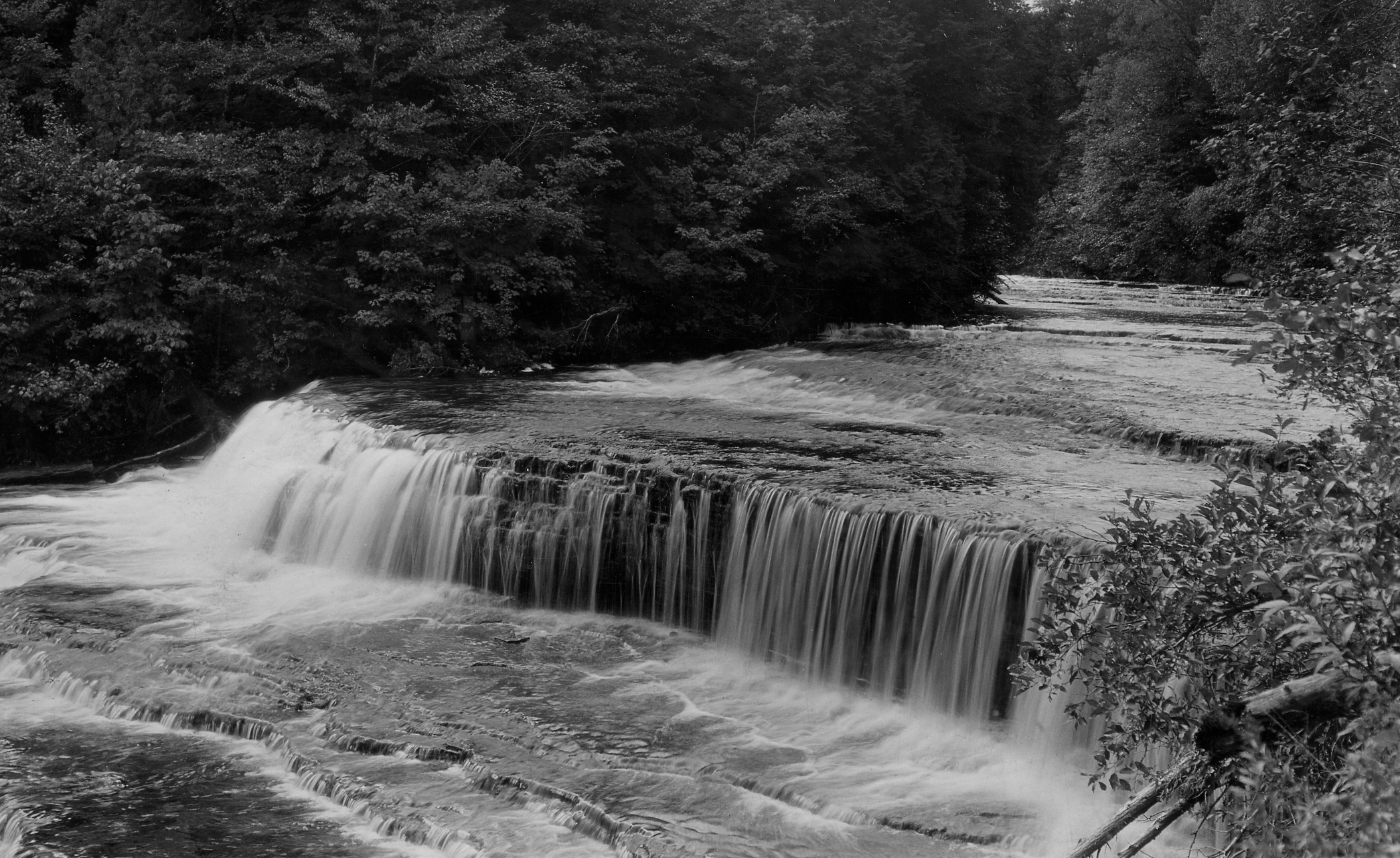
- Au Train Falls

Location
- Country: United States

Physical characteristics
- Source
  - location: Au Train Township, Alger County, Michigan
  - coordinates: 46.33272°N 86.84959°W
- Mouth
  - location: Lake Superior, Michigan
  - coordinates: 46.4341°N 86.83654°W

The Au Train River (/ˌoʊ ˈtʃreɪn/ oh-TCHRAYN) is a 16.8-mile-long (27.0 km) river in Au Train Township, Alger County, Michigan. It rises at the outlet of Cleveland Cliffs Basin, a reservoir, and flows north, passing through Au Train Lake, and entering Lake Superior at the village of Au Train.

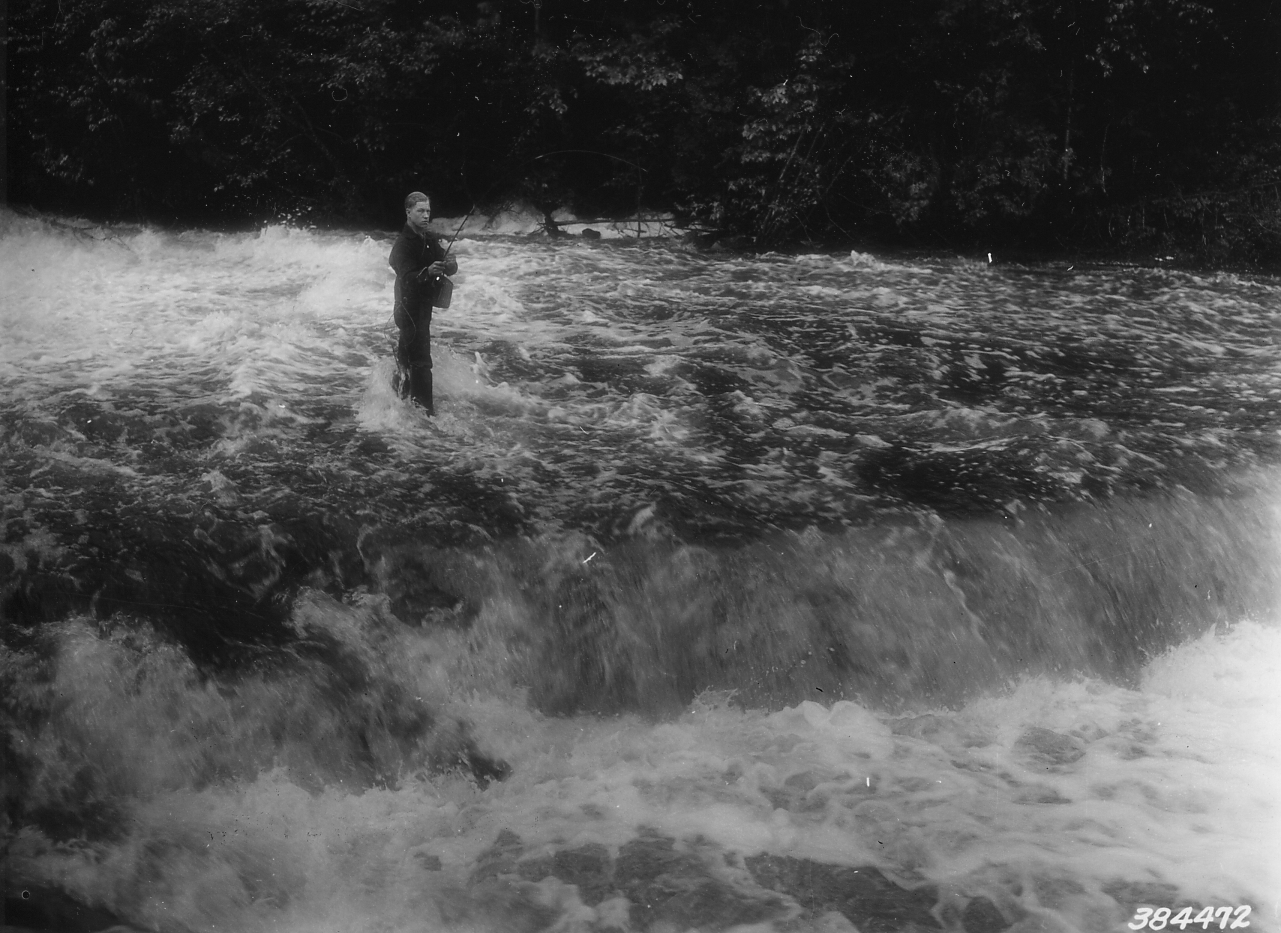
Fishing below Au Train Falls in the 1930s

== See also ==
- List of rivers of Michigan
