= Middle Branch River =

Coordinates: 43°58′38″N 85°06′02″W

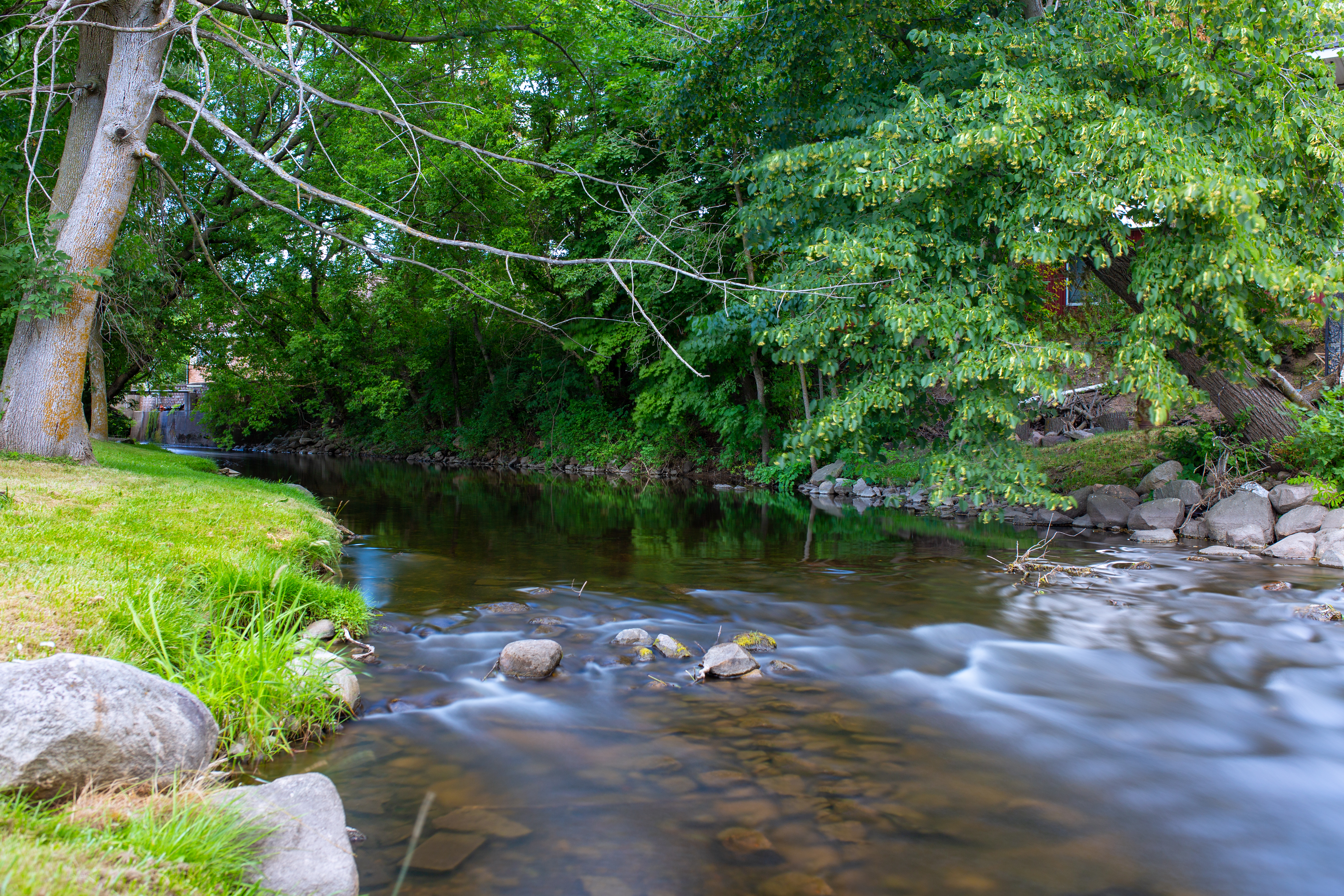
- Middle Branch River flowing through Marion

Location
- Country: United States

Physical characteristics
- Source
  - location: Michigan

The Middle Branch River is a 35.1-mile-long (56.5 km) tributary of the Muskegon River in Osceola County, Michigan, in the United States.

== See also ==
- List of rivers of Michigan
