= Shakey River =

Coordinates: 45°24′52″N 87°51′06″W

Location
- Country: United States

Physical characteristics
- Source
  - location: Michigan

The Shakey River is a 26.2-mile-long (42.2 km) river on the Upper Peninsula of Michigan which flows into the Menominee River, a tributary of Lake Michigan.

== See also ==
- List of rivers of Michigan
