= Flintsteel River =

Location
- Country: United States

Physical characteristics
- Source
  - location: Michigan
- Mouth
  - location: 46°55′35″N 89°12′27″W

The Flintsteel River is a 28.3-mile-long (45.5 km) river in Ontonagon County on the Upper Peninsula of Michigan in the United States. It is a tributary of Lake Superior.

== See also ==
- List of rivers of Michigan
