= Milk River (Michigan) =

- Location within the state of Michigan

Location
- Country: United States

Physical characteristics
- Source
  - location: Michigan
- Mouth
  - location: 42°27′38″N 82°52′32″W

The Milk River is a 1.7-mile-long (2.7 km) stream in Wayne County and Macomb County, Michigan, flowing into Lake St. Clair. It flows through the cities of Harper Woods, Grosse Pointe Woods and St. Clair Shores.

Over half of the river is now underground including the low, inland area of the once swampy Black Marsh Ditch. The decision to contain and bury the river was made August 18, 1955 at a Draining Board Meeting of officials from the State of Michigan, Macomb County, and Oakland County. Now only open to the air past the Milk River Pump Station on Parkway Drive.

== See also ==
- List of rivers of Michigan
- Subterranean Rivers of the United States
