= Quanicassee River =

Location
- Country: United States

Physical characteristics
- Source
  - location: Michigan
- Mouth
  - location: 43°35′30″N 83°40′40″W

The Quanicassee River is a river in Michigan, United States.

== See also ==
- List of rivers of Michigan
