= Sebewaing River =

Coordinates: 43°44′13″N 83°27′55″W

Location
- Country: United States

Physical characteristics
- Source
  - location: Michigan
- Mouth
  - location: Saginaw Bay

The Sebewaing River is a river in Michigan that flows through Sebewaing Township, Michigan and empties into Saginaw Bay.

== See also ==
- List of rivers of Michigan
