= Rock River (Lake Michigan) =

Coordinates: 46°05′03″N 85°32′02″W

Location
- Country: United States

Physical characteristics
- Source
  - location: Michigan

The Rock River is a 13.4-mile-long (21.6 km) river on the Upper Peninsula of Michigan in the United States, flowing to Lake Michigan.

== See also ==
- List of rivers of Michigan
