= Sage River =

Location
- Country: United States

Physical characteristics
- Source
  - location: Michigan
- Mouth
  - location: 46°22′28″N 85°18′37″W

The Sage River is a 9.7-mile-long (15.6 km) tributary of the Tahquamenon River on the Upper Peninsula of Michigan in the United States.

== See also ==
- List of rivers of Michigan
