= Driggs River =

Coordinates: 46°11′34″N 85°59′16″W

Location
- Country: United States

Physical characteristics
- Source
  - location: Michigan

The Driggs River is a 36.2-mile-long (58.3 km) tributary of the Manistique River on the Upper Peninsula of Michigan in the United States. It flows for its entire length in Schoolcraft County.

== See also ==
- List of rivers of Michigan
