= Little Brevoort River =

Location
- Country: United States

Physical characteristics
- Source
  - location: Michigan
- Mouth
  - location: 46°00′50″N 84°58′46″W

The Little Brevoort River is a 14.7-mile-long (23.7 km) river on the Upper Peninsula of Michigan in the United States. It flows generally southeast to Brevoort Lake, the outlet of which is the Brevoort River, flowing to Lake Michigan.

== See also ==
- List of rivers of Michigan
