= Shoepac River =

Coordinates: 46°10′49″N 85°47′27″W

Location
- Country: United States

Physical characteristics
- Source
  - location: Michigan

The Shoepac River is a 1.1-mile-long (1.8 km) channel connecting Shoepac Lake and South Manistique Lake on the Upper Peninsula of Michigan in the United States. It is part of the Manistique River watershed, flowing to Lake Michigan.

== See also ==
- List of rivers of Michigan
