= Net River =

Coordinates: 46°13′34″N 88°35′49″W

Location
- Country: United States

Physical characteristics
- Source
  - location: Michigan

The Net River is a 14.9-mile-long (24.0 km) river in Michigan in the United States. Its headwaters rise in Baraga County and flow southwest into Iron County, where the main stem forms and flows to the Paint River above Crystal Falls.

== See also ==
- List of rivers of Michigan
