= Little Tobacco River =

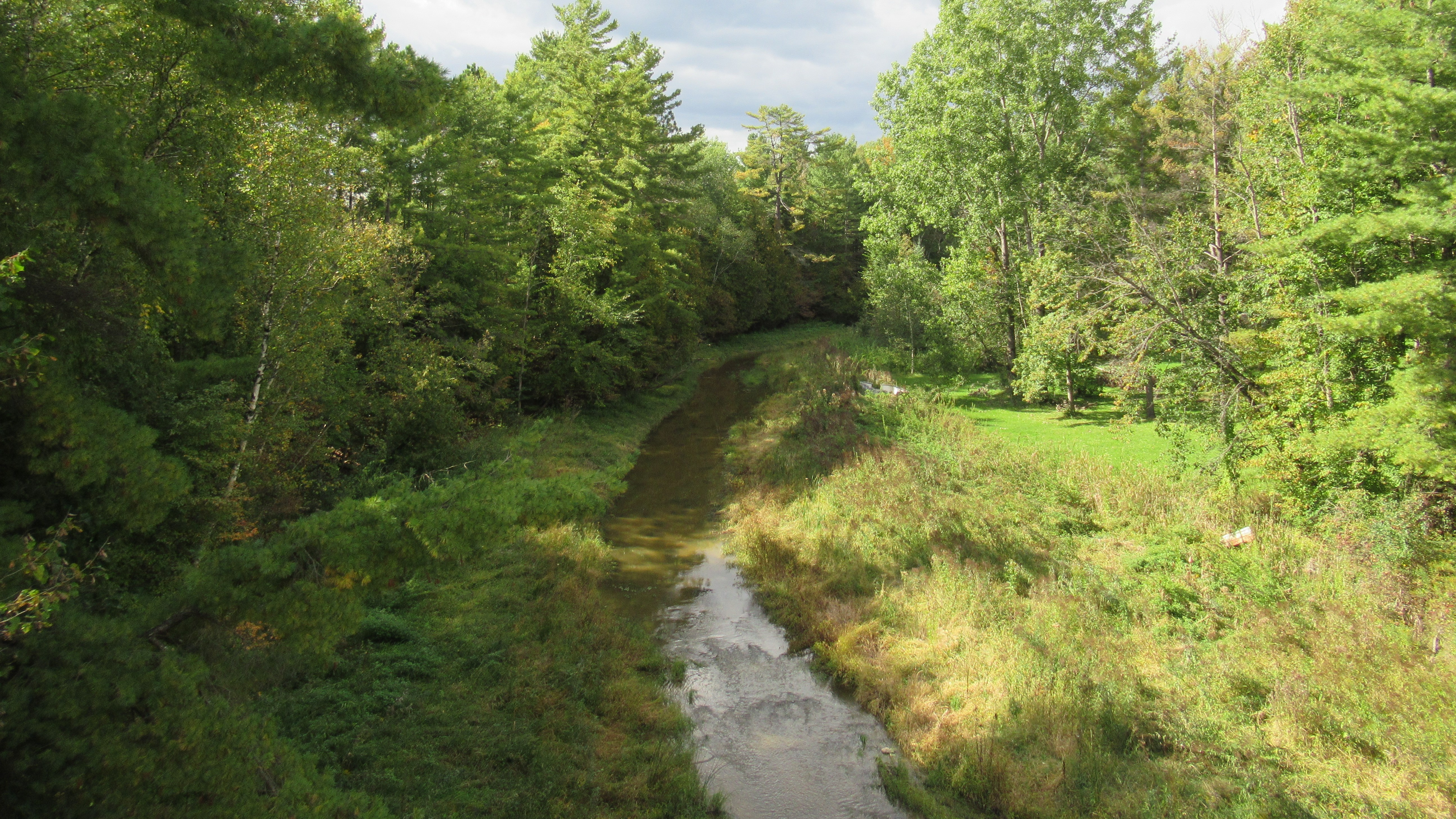
- The river along M-30 in Gladwin Township

- Location within the state of Michigan

Location
- Country: United States

Physical characteristics
- Source
  - location: Michigan
- Mouth
  - location: 43°59′08″N 84°21′47″W

The Little Tobacco River is a 10.5-mile-long (16.9 km) river in Gladwin County, Michigan, in the United States. It is a tributary of the Tittabawassee River, which flows to the Saginaw River.

== See also ==
- List of rivers of Michigan
