= Pilgrim River =

Coordinates: 47.106°N 88.512°W

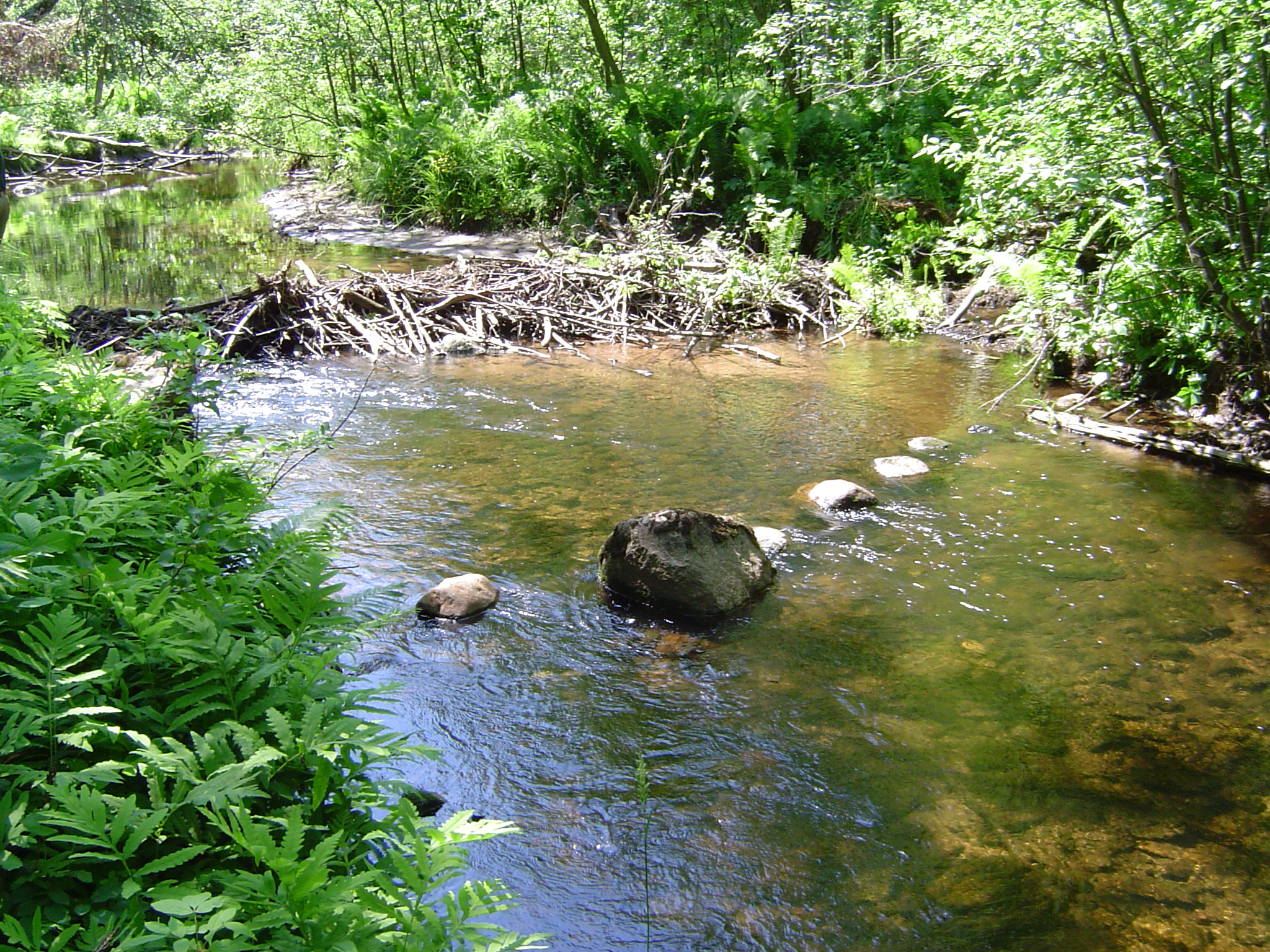

Location
- Country: United States

Physical characteristics
- Source
  - location: Portage Township, Houghton County, Michigan
- Mouth
  - location: Keweenaw Waterway
- Basin size: 16,000 acres (65 km^{2})

The Pilgrim River is a 12.9-mile-long (20.8 km) river in Portage Township, Houghton County, Michigan, in the United States. The river flows near the Portage Lake Golf Course and empties into the Keweenaw Waterway, which connects to Lake Superior.

In 2010, the Pilgrim River Watershed Project formed with the goal to secure easements along the river to keep the river accessible for non-motorized recreation. The protected area comprises 1,382 acres (559 ha) of mature forestlands encompassing over 3 miles (5 km) of the river.

== See also ==
- List of rivers of Michigan
