= Jumbo River =

Location
- Country: United States

Physical characteristics
- Source
  - location: Michigan
- Mouth
  - location: 46°22′34″N 88°53′54″W

The Jumbo River is a 15.5-mile-long (24.9 km) tributary of the East Branch Ontonagon River in Iron and Houghton counties on the Upper Peninsula of Michigan in the United States. Via the East Branch, its waters flow north to the Ontonagon River and then to Lake Superior.

== See also ==
- List of rivers of Michigan
