= Pelton River =

Coordinates: 46°23′29″N 89°33′59″W

Location
- Country: United States

Physical characteristics
- Source
  - location: Michigan

The Pelton River is a 5.9-mile-long (9.5 km) tributary of the Slate River in Gogebic County on the Upper Peninsula of Michigan in the United States. Via the Slate River, its water flows to Lake Gogebic, which feeds the West Branch Ontonagon River, flowing to the Ontonagon River and ultimately to Lake Superior.

== See also ==
- List of rivers of Michigan
