= North River (Michigan) =

Tributary of Flat Creek in Michigan, United States

Coordinates: 41.77060°N 83.57327°W

- Location within the state of Michigan

Location
- Country: United States

Physical characteristics
- Source
  - location: Michigan

The North River is a 1.1-mile-long (1.8 km) stream in Bedford Township in southeastern Michigan, the United States. It is a tributary of Flat Creek, which flows northeast to Little Lake Creek, a tributary of Lake Erie.

== See also ==
- List of rivers of Michigan
