= Cliff River =

River in Michigan, United States

Coordinates: 46°50′05″N 87°56′36″W

Location
- Country: United States

Physical characteristics
- Source
  - location: Michigan

The Cliff River is a 6.8-mile-long (10.9 km) river on the Upper Peninsula of Michigan in the United States. It is a tributary of Mountain Lake, which drains by Mountain Stream to Pine Lake, which in turn drains by the Pine River to Lake Superior.

== See also ==
- List of rivers of Michigan
