= Silver River (Keweenaw County) =

Location
- Country: United States

Physical characteristics
- Source
  - location: Keweenaw County, Michigan
- Mouth
  - location: Lake Superior

Basin features
- Tributaries
  - left: Upson Creek
  - right: Bailey Creek

The Silver River is a 3.2-mile-long (5.1 km) stream near the northern tip of the Keweenaw Peninsula in the U.S. state of Michigan. It rises out of a marsh around Bailey Pond at 47°26′16″N 88°03′08″W and flows mostly northward into Lake Superior at 47°28′05″N 88°04′26″W.
