= Big Iron River =

Location
- Country: United States

Physical characteristics
- Source
  - location: Michigan
- Mouth
  - location: 46°49′53″N 89°34′14″W

The Big Iron River is a 28.3-mile-long (45.5 km) river in western Ontonagon County on the Upper Peninsula of Michigan in the United States. It flows northwards, entering Lake Superior at the village of Silver City.

== See also ==
- List of rivers of Michigan
