= Little Trout River (Michigan) =

Location
- Country: United States

Physical characteristics
- Source
  - location: Michigan
- Mouth
  - location: 45°22′07″N 83°40′07″W

The Little Trout River is a 9.2-mile-long (14.8 km) river in Presque Isle County, Michigan, in the United States. It is a tributary of Lake Huron.

== See also ==
- List of rivers of Michigan
