= Silver River (Baraga County) =

Location
- Country: United States

Physical characteristics
- Source
  - location: Baraga County, Michigan
- Mouth
  - location: Huron Bay, Lake Superior

Basin features
- Tributaries
  - left: Dakota Creek; East Branch Silver River
  - right: Kallio Creek; Gamanche Creek

The Silver River is a 24.9-mile-long (40.1 km) river in the U.S. state of Michigan. It rises from the outflow of Fisher Lake at 46°39′18″N 88°14′06″W and flows in an arc to the northwest, then bends to the northeast before emptying into Huron Bay of Lake Superior at 46°48′58″N 88°17′45″W.

Silver Falls are located on the river at 46°47′34″N 88°20′11″W.
