= Fence River =

Tributary of the Michigamme River in Iron County, Upper Peninsula of Michigan

Location
- Country: United States
- State: Michigan
- County: Iron

Physical characteristics
- Source: Interior uplands and wetlands
  - location: Iron County, Michigan, U.S.
- Mouth: Michigamme River
  - location: Iron County, Michigan, U.S.

The Fence River is a tributary of the Michigamme River in Iron County on Michigan’s Upper Peninsula. It drains forested uplands and wetlands in the south-central portion of the county and flows generally east to join the Michigamme River, part of the Menominee River system that reaches Lake Michigan.

== Course ==
Headwaters arise in interior wetlands and small lakes in Iron County. The river meanders through mixed northern hardwood–conifer forest and low glacial terrain, gathering short tributary streams before entering the Michigamme River in the county’s eastern drainage.

== Natural history ==
=== Geology and landforms ===
The basin occupies glacial till and outwash typical of the Menominee–Michigamme uplands. Gentle gradients in the upper reaches create oxbows and backwater wetlands; short bedrock or coarse-gravel sections near the lower river produce riffles and small drops.

=== Plants and wildlife ===
Uplands support sugar maple, birch, and aspen mixed with hemlock, white pine, and spruce–fir. Riparian corridors include alder thickets, cedar swales, and sedge meadows. Cool, shaded reaches and spring inputs provide habitat for cold- to cool-water fishes; warmer backwaters near the confluence support species typical of the Michigamme main stem.

== See also ==
- Michigamme River
- Menominee River
- List of rivers of Michigan
