= Black River (Mackinac County) =

River on the upper peninsula of Michigan, United States

Location
- Country: United States

Physical characteristics
- Mouth
  - location: Lake Michigan
  - elevation: 581 ft (177 m)

Black River is an 11.0-mile-long (17.7 km) river on the Upper Peninsula of the U.S. state of Michigan. The river flows into Lake Michigan at , approximately 5 miles (8 km) east of Naubinway.

The main branch of the river rises at in a marshy area in eastern Garfield Township near Cranberry Lake Bog. The East Branch rises at in Hudson Township and joins the main course at . All of the river's drainage basin is within Mackinac County, much of it within the Lake Superior State Forest.

Tributaries (from the mouth):

- East Branch Black River
  - Borgstrom Creek
- Peters Creek
- Silver Creek
- Bark Creek
