= Black River (Marquette County) =

Location
- Country: United States

Physical characteristics
- Mouth
  - location: Middle Branch Escanaba River
  - elevation: 1,391 ft (424 m)

Black River is a 29.8-mile-long (48.0 km) river on the Upper Peninsula of the U.S. state of Michigan. The river flows into the Middle Branch Escanaba River in Ely Township of Marquette County at and on into Lake Michigan.

The river rises out of Goose Lake in northeast Republic Township at and flows generally southeast through north-central Humboldt Township into Ely Township and the Middle Branch Escanaba River.

Tributaries (from the mouth):

- Bruce Creek
  - Buto Lake
- Tower Lake
- Unnamed stream
  - Nirish Lake
  - Granite Lake
- Unnamed stream
  - Lake Lory
  - Mud Lake
- Twin Lake
- Goose Lake
- Perch Lake
- Horseshoe Lake
