= Hemlock River =

Location
- Country: United States

Physical characteristics
- Source
  - location: Michigan
- Mouth
  - location: 46°12′32″N 88°30′18″W

The Hemlock River is a 12.9-mile-long (20.8 km) river in Michigan in the United States. It is a tributary of the Paint River, which flows to the Brule River, then the Menominee River, and ultimately Lake Michigan.

== See also ==
- List of rivers of Michigan
