= Union River (Michigan) =

Location
- Country: United States

Physical characteristics
- Source
  - location: Michigan
- Mouth
  - location: 46°49′09″N 89°37′11″W

The Union River is a 5.5-mile-long (8.9 km) river in Porcupine Mountains Wilderness State Park on the Upper Peninsula of Michigan in the United States. It is a tributary of Lake Superior.

== See also ==
- List of rivers of Michigan
