= Little Black River (Gogebic County) =

Location
- Country: United States

Physical characteristics
- Source
  - location: Bessemer Township, Michigan
- Mouth
  - location: north of Ramsay, Michigan

The Little Black River is a 19.6-mile-long (31.5 km) stream in Gogebic County in the U.S. state of Michigan. It rises in Bessemer Township at 46°21′23″N 89°53′09″W} and flows mostly north to Sunday Lake in Wakefield, then westward for approximately a mile before emptying into the Black River at 46°29′18″N 89°59′49″W, just north of Ramsay. The water is approximately 14 inches (360 mm) deep.
