= Perch River =

Coordinates: 46°34′03″N 88°38′45″W

Location
- Country: United States

Physical characteristics
- Source
  - location: Michigan

The Perch River is a 25.4-mile-long (40.9 km) tributary of the Sturgeon River in Iron County and Baraga County on the Upper Peninsula of Michigan in the United States. The Perch River begins at the outlet of Perch Lake in Bates Township and flows north through Ottawa National Forest to the Sturgeon River.

== See also ==
- List of rivers of Michigan
