= Rainy River (Michigan) =

Location
- Country: United States

Physical characteristics
- Source
  - location: Michigan
- Mouth
  - location: 45°26′41″N 84°12′58″W
- Length: 22.5 mi (36.2 km)

The Rainy River is a 22.5-mile-long (36.2 km) river in Presque Isle County, Michigan, in the United States. It is located in the northern part of the Lower Peninsula of Michigan, flowing northwest from Rainy Lake to Black Lake. Its waters, after passing through Black Lake, flow via the Black River and the Cheboygan River to Lake Huron. It is also home to Rainy River Falls, the largest waterfall in the Lower Peninsula of Michigan. The waterfall is currently located on private property and while it was open to the public at one time, rowdy tourists forced the owners to close the area due to vandalism. It has been closed to the public for some time.

== See also ==
- List of rivers of Michigan
