= Otter River (Michigan) =

Coordinates: 46°54′15″N 88°34′58″W

Location
- Country: United States

Physical characteristics
- Source
  - location: Michigan

The Otter River is a 10.0-mile-long (16.1 km) river in Houghton County, Michigan, in the United States. It was home to the last known population of Michigan Grayling. No grayling have been seen or caught in the river since 1938.

== See also ==
- List of rivers of Michigan
