= Bell River (Michigan) =

Location
- Country: United States

Physical characteristics
- Source
  - location: Presque Isle Township, Presque Isle County
- Mouth
  - location: False Presque Isle Harbor on Lake Huron
  - elevation: 581 ft (177 m)

Bell River is a short river in Presque Isle County in the U.S. state of Michigan.

Less than 1 mile (1.6 km) long, Bell River is entirely within Presque Isle Township and flows from an unnamed lake into False Presque Isle Harbor at . on Lake Huron approximately 9 miles (14 km) north of the city of Alpena.

Bell River, along with the unnamed lake, nearly completely separates False Presque Isle from the rest of Presque Isle Township.
