= Black Mallard River =

Location
- Country: United States

Physical characteristics
- Source
  - location: Bearinger Township, Presque Isle County, Michigan
- Mouth
  - location: Lake Huron
  - elevation: 581 ft (177 m)
- Length: 10 mi (16 km)

The Black Mallard River, also known as Carp Creek, is a short river in the Lower Peninsula of the U.S. state of Michigan. The river is approximately 10 miles (16 km) long and flows into Lake Huron about 15 miles (24 km) east of Cheboygan at .

The Black Mallard rises in Bearinger Township in northwest Presque Isle County and flows mostly east and south into Black Mallard Lake about a mile inland from Lake Huron. Its entire length lies within Bearinger Township. 100% of the frontage is privately owned. Depth varies from 6 inches to 6 feet. Width varies from 12 to 22 feet. Numerous tree falls and beaver dams.

The Black Mallard River also hosts nice rainbow trout, and smallmouth bass fishing and a large number of rock bass as well.
