= Blind Sucker River =

- Location within the state of Michigan

Location
- Country: United States

Physical characteristics
- Source
  - location: Michigan
- Mouth
  - location: 46°40′47″N 85°40′41″W

The Blind Sucker River is a 10.8-mile-long (17.4 km) river in northwestern Luce County on the Upper Peninsula of Michigan in the United States. It is a tributary of Lake Superior.

== See also ==
- List of rivers of Michigan
