= Elm River (Michigan) =

Location
- Country: United States

Physical characteristics
- Source
  - location: Michigan
- Mouth
  - location: 47°02′45″N 88°55′19″W

The Elm River is a 16.0-mile-long (25.7 km) river in western Houghton County on the Upper Peninsula of Michigan in the United States. It is a tributary of Lake Superior.

== See also ==
- List of rivers of Michigan
