= Little Carp River (Baraga County) =

Location
- Country: United States

Physical characteristics
- Source
  - location: Keweenaw Peninsula
- Mouth
  - location: Keweenaw Bay
  - elevation: 604 ft (184 m)

Little Carp River is a 9.1-mile-long (14.6 km) stream in Baraga County in the U.S. state of Michigan. The Little Carp River rises at 46°46′22″N 88°34′34″W on the Upper Peninsula.

The river flows generally to the northeast and empties into Keweenaw Bay of Lake Superior at 46°50′06″N 88°28′55″W on the southeast side of the Keweenaw Peninsula.
