= Silver River (Baraga–Houghton counties) =

Location
- Country: United States

Physical characteristics
- Source
  - location: Houghton County, Michigan
- Mouth
  - location: Baraga County, Michigan

The Silver River is a 31.3-mile-long (50.4 km) stream in the Upper Peninsula in the U.S. state of Michigan.

It rises in Houghton County at 46°35′42″N 88°47′56″W and flows mostly northward into the Sturgeon River in Baraga County at 46°48′02″N 88°37′32″W.
