= Ruby Creek (Michigan) =

Creek in Michigan, United States

Coordinates: 43°48′59″N 86°05′09″W

Ruby Creek is a 4.6-mile-long (7.4 km) tributary to the Big South Branch of the Pere Marquette River in western Michigan in the United States. The creek runs west to east in northern Oceana County, 13 miles (21 km) West-southwest of Baldwin, and is known as a lake run trout and salmon fishery.
