= Deer River (Michigan) =

River in the United States of America

Coordinates: 46°12′00″N 88°19′08″W

The Deer River is a 19-mile-long (31 km) stream in the Upper Peninsula of the U.S. state of Michigan. The river rises in northeast Iron County and flows south into the western arm of the Michigamme Reservoir.
