= Firesteel River (Michigan) =

River in Michigan, United States

Coordinates: 46°56′05″N 89°11′47″W

Location
- Country: United States
- State: Michigan
- Counties: Houghton; Ontonagon

Physical characteristics
- Source: Interior uplands and wetlands (multiple branches)
  - location: Western Upper Peninsula, Michigan, U.S.
- Mouth: Lake Superior
  - location: Ontonagon County, Michigan, U.S.

Firesteel River is an 18.3-mile-long (29.5 km)[1] river in Ontonagon County on the Upper Peninsula of the U.S. state of Michigan. The river flows generally northwest between the Flintsteel River and the West Sleeping River and empties into Lake Superior. Branches of the river are identified as the West Branch and East Branch, and the river receives Black Creek about three miles north of the junction of the two main branches.

The east branch rises in the Mishwabic State Forest and runs southwest in its early course. It receives Senecal Creek and another Black Creek. The west branch has its source in the Ottawa National Forest and receives Silver Creek near the boundary of the national forest and the state forest. Both branches run near each other through the state forest.
