= Partridge Creek (Michigan) =

Stream in Marquette County, Michigan, U.S.

Coordinates: 46°29′40″N 87°39′15″W

Partridge Creek is a stream in Marquette County, Michigan, in the United States.

Partridge Creek was named for the ruffed grouse, commonly called a partridge, seen at the creek by early surveyors.

== See also ==
- List of rivers of Michigan
