= River Styx (Marquette County, Michigan) =

Coordinates: 46°51′34″N 87°50′47″W

Location
- Country: United States

The River Styx is a 0.6-mile-long (1.0 km) stream in Marquette County, Michigan, in the United States. It flows from the outlet of Ives Lake north over a waterfall to Third Lake, an arm of Pine Lake. Via the Pine River (the outlet of Pine Lake), water from the River Styx flows to Lake Superior.

== See also ==
- List of rivers of Michigan
