= Trout River (Michigan) =

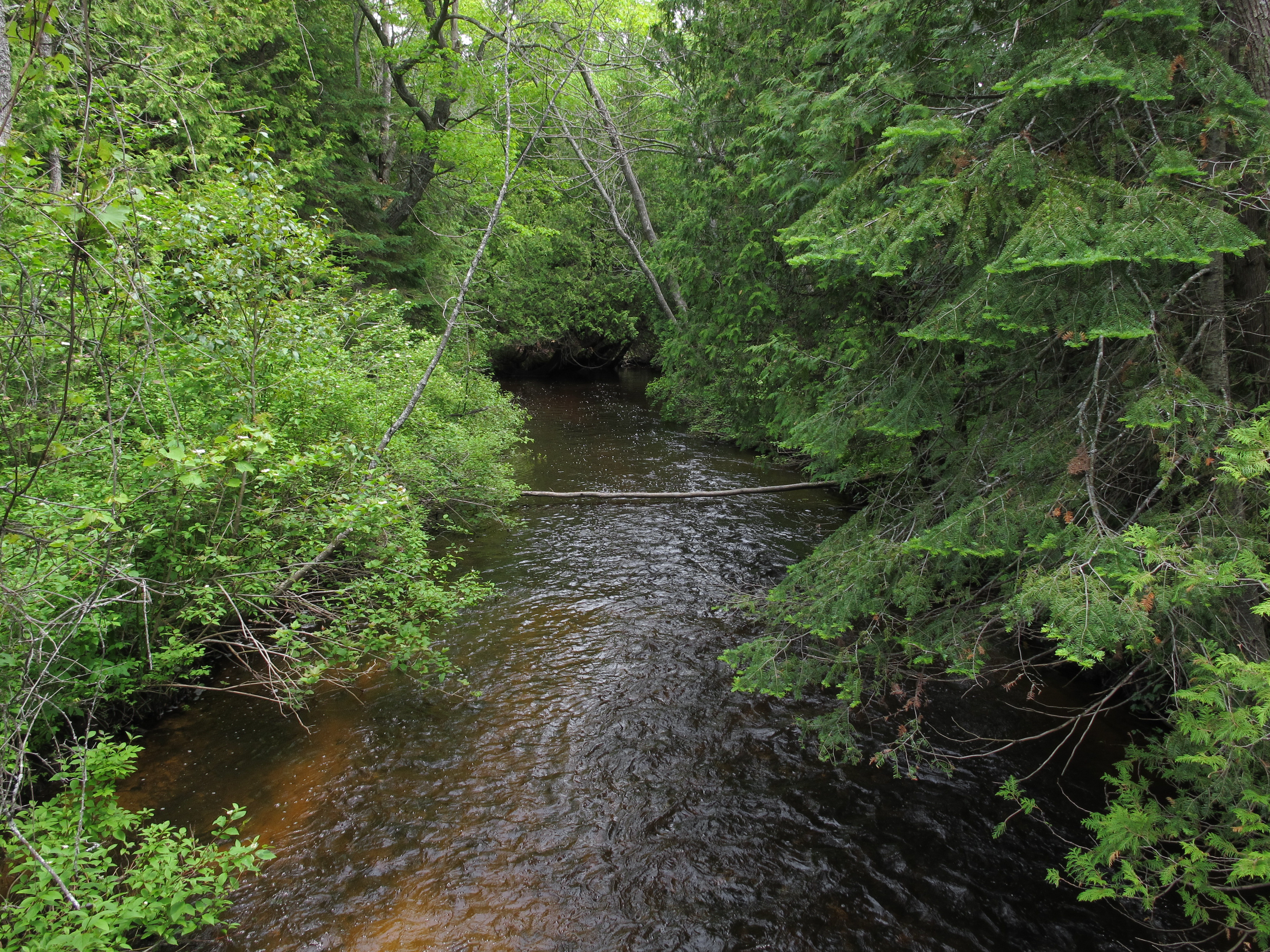
- The Trout River in Rogers City

Location
- Country: United States

Physical characteristics
- Source
  - location: Michigan
- Mouth
  - location: 45°25′45″N 83°49′38″W

The Trout River is an 8.5-mile-long (13.7 km) river in Presque Isle County, Michigan, in the United States. It flows into Lake Huron at Rogers City.

== See also ==
- List of rivers of Michigan
