= Cataract River (Michigan) =

River in Michigan, United States

Location
- Country: United States

Physical characteristics
- Source
  - location: Mud Lake
  - elevation
- Mouth
  - location: Lake Michigan
  - elevation: 584 ft (178 m)

The Cataract River is a 1.9-mile-long (3.1 km) river in Newton Township, Mackinac County in the Upper Peninsula of the U.S. state of Michigan.

The river rises from Mud Lake at 45°59′59″N 85°39′38″W in southern Newton Township. It flows south approximately one half mile and receives the outflow from Stone Lake, then continues to the south and west just under one mile into Lake Michigan at 45°59′15″N 85°38′36″W between Point Patterson and Needle Point
