= Jordan River (Beaver Island) =

Jordan River is a stream or very small river on Beaver Island of approximately 2 miles (3.2 km) in length. Flowing northeastward into Lake Michigan, it drains an area of wetlands in central Beaver Island. Much of the river is located within the Beaver Islands State Wildlife Research Area.
