= Ravine River (Michigan) =

Location
- Country: United States

Physical characteristics
- Source
  - location: Baraga County, Michigan
- Mouth
  - location: Baraga County, Michigan

The Ravine River is a 16.2-mile-long (26.1 km) stream on the Upper Peninsula of Michigan in the United States.

It rises in Baraga County near Mount Arvon at 46°44′50″N 88°08′19″W and flows initially northward and then westward into the Huron Bay of Lake Superior at 46°50′27″N 88°15′07″W.
