= List of Michigan placenames of Native American origin =

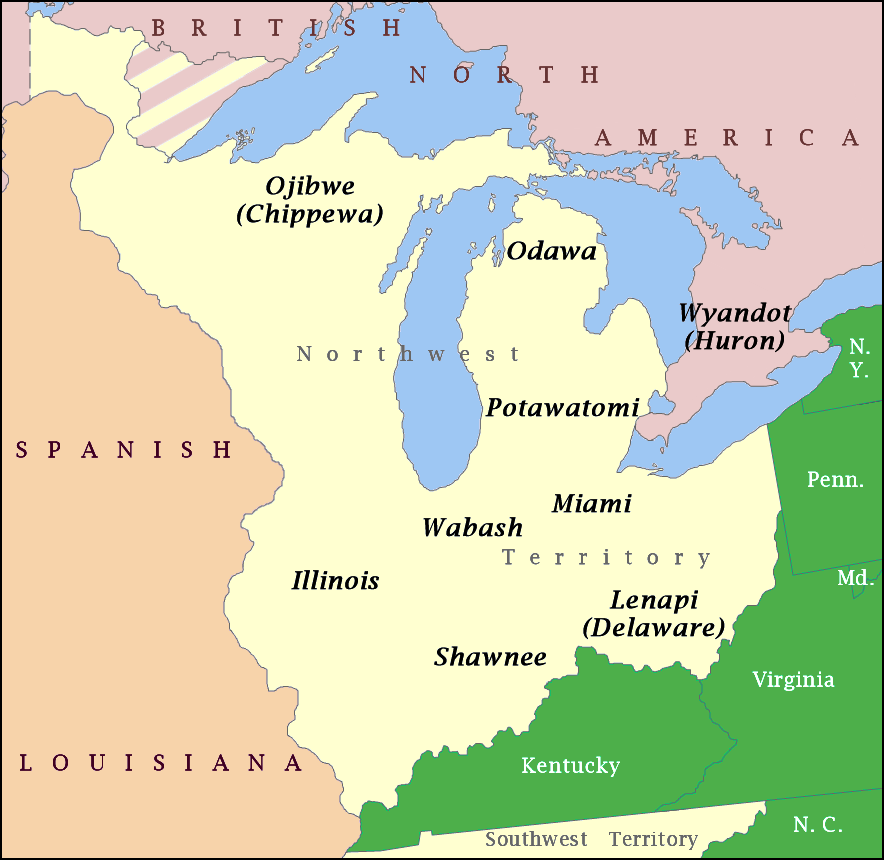
Map of Native American populations of the Northwest Territory. Most of Michigan's Native American-derived place names come from the languages spoken in these groups.

Many places throughout the state of Michigan take their names from Native American indigenous languages. This list includes counties, townships, and settlements whose names are derived from indigenous languages in Michigan.

The primary Native American languages in Michigan are Ojibwe, Odawa, and Potawatomi, all of which are dialects of Algonquin. Some other places names in Michigan are found to be derived from Sauk, Oneida, Wyandot, Abenaki, Shawnee, Mohawk, Seneca, Seminole, Iroquois, and Delaware, although many of these tribes are not found in Michigan.

== Municipalities ==
=== State ===
Michigan – derived from Ottawa "mishigami" meaning "large water" or "great water" in reference to the Great Lakes.

- Village of Michigan Center
- Lake Michigan

=== Counties ===
Some of Michigan's counties have names invented by the ethnologist Henry Schoolcraft, usually adapted from parts of Native American words, but sometimes having parts from Greek, Arabic and Latin roots.

- Alcona County – "the good plain".
- Allegan County – "the front" or "the mound builders".
  - City of Allegan
  - Township of Allegan
- Alpena County – "the good partridge country".
- Arenac County – "a sandy place for good footing".
  - Township of Arenac
- Cheboygan County – Ojibwe word "zhaabonigan" meaning "sewing needle" or "chabwegan" meaning "a place of ore".
  - City of Cheboygan
  - Cheboygan River
  - Cheboygan State Park
  - Cheboygan Point
- Chippewa County – after the Ojibwe tribe.
  - Chippewa Township in Chippewa County
  - Chippewa Township in Isabella County
  - Chippewa Township in Mecosta County
  - Chippewa River
  - Chippewa Nature Center
- Genesee County – Seneca word "jenishiyeh" meaning "beautiful valley".
  - Village of Genesee
  - Township of Genesee
  - Hamlet of Genesee
- Gogebic County – Native American word "agogibing" meaning "water-mold lake".
  - Lake Gogebic
  - Lake Gogebic State Park
  - Gogebic Range
- Huron County – named after the Huron people.
  - Lake Huron
  - Little Huron River
  - Huron River (Lower Peninsula)
  - Huron River (Upper Peninsula)
  - Huron Mountains
- Iosco County – "water light".
- Kalamazoo County – see Etymology of Kalamazoo.
  - City of Kalamazoo
  - Kalamazoo River
  - Kalamazoo Lake
- Keweenaw County – Ojibwe word "gakiiwe-wewaning" meaning "portage" or "where portage is made".
  - Keweenaw Peninsula
- Leelanau County – after a Native American woman in Schoolcraft's writings, meaning "delight of life".
  - Township of Leelanau
- Lenawee County – from the Shawnee word lenawai, meaning "man".
- Mackinac County – Odawa word "michilimaciknac" meaning "great turtle", in reference to Mackinac Island.
  - Mackinac Island
- Manistee County – originally called "ministigweyaa" in Ojibwe meaning "river with islands at its mouth".
  - City of Manistee
  - Township of Manistee
  - Little Manistee River
  - Manistee River
  - Manistee Lake
- Mecosta County – after Potawatomi chief Mecosta.
  - Mecosta Township
- Menominee County – after the Menominee people who inhabited the region.
  - City of Menominee
  - Menominee River
- Missaukee County – after Chief Nessaukee, which also means "large mouth of the river" in Odawa.
  - Lake Missaukee
- Muskegon County – after the Muskegon River, called "mashkig" by the Ojibwe, meaning "swamp" or "marsh".
  - City of Muskegon
  - Little Muskegon River
  - Muskegon River
  - Muskegon Lake
- Newaygo County – named either for an Ojibwe leader who signed the Saginaw Treaty of 1819 or for an Ojibwe word meaning "much water".
  - City of Newaygo
- Ogemaw County – Ojibwe word "ogimaa" meaning "chief".
  - Township of Ogemaw
  - Village of Ogemaw Springs
- Ontonagon County – from "nantounaging" meaning "my bowl is lost".
  - Village of Ontonagon
  - Ontonagon Township
  - Ontonagon River
- Osceola County – after Chief Osceola of the Seminole.
  - Township of Osceola (Houghton County).
  - Township of Osceola Township
- Oscoda County – from the Ojibwa words ossin and muskoda, meaning "prairie of pebbles".
- Otsego County – Mohawk word meaning "clear water".
  - City of Otsego
  - Township of Otsego
  - Township of Otsego Lake
  - Village of Otsego Lake
  - Otsego Lake
- Ottawa County – after the Odawa (Ottawa) people who inhabited the region.
  - Ottawa River
  - Village of Ottawa Lake
  - Ottawa National Forest
- Saginaw County – Ojibwe word "sagenong" meaning "place of the outlet".
  - City of Saginaw
  - Saginaw River
- Sanilac County – Chief Sanilac of the Wyandot people.
- Shiawassee County – from the Chippewa word "shia-was-see" meaning "the river straight ahead."
  - Township of Shiawassee
  - Village of Shiawasseetown
  - Shiawassee River
- Tuscola County – portmanteau of the Chippewa word "desakamigaa" ("flat land"), and the Latin word colonia ("colony").
  - Tuscola Township
- Washtenaw County – Ojibwe word "washtenong" meaning "far away waters".

=== Other settlements ===
- Ahmeek – Ojibwe word "amik" meaning "beaver".
- Alaska – named for the eponymous state.
- Algonquin – named after the Algonquin people.
  - Algonquin Lake
  - Algonquin Lake (Barry County)
- Aloha
  - Village of Aloha
- Assinins – from the Ojibwe word "asiniinsikaajiigibiig".
- Bay de Noc – named after the Noquet people.
  - Big Bay de Noc
  - Little Bay de Noc
- Canandaigua
- Chesaning – Ojibwe word meaning "big rock place".
  - Shared with the township of Chesaning.
- Chikaming – Indian word "chickaming" meaning "lake".
- Cohoctah – Indian word meaning "many trees in water".
  - Cohoctah in Livingston County
- Dakota Heights
  - Dakota Creek (Baraga County)
- Dowagiac – Potawatomi word "dewje'og" meaning "fishing waters".
  - Dowagiac River
- Escanaba – Ojibwe word meaning "land of the red buck" or "flat rock".
  - Township of Escanaba
  - Escanaba River
- Hiawatha – after Chief Hiawatha.
  - Hiawatha National Forest
- Ishpeming – Ojibwe word "ishpiming" meaning "on air".
- Juniata – derived from the Iroquois word onayutta, meaning "standing rock".
- Kalamo
  - Village of Kalamo
- Kawkawlin – Ojibwe word "ogaakaaning" meaning "place of pike fish".
  - Village of Kawkawlin
  - Kawkawlin River
- Kentucky – named after the state of Kentucky.
- Kenockee – Ojibwe word meaning "long-legged".
- Mackinaw City – Odawa word "michilimackinac" meaning "land of the great snapping turtle".
  - Township of Mackinaw
- Manistique – originally "Monistique", Indian word "onamanitigong" meaning "vermillion" or "yellow thunder" after the hue of the Manistique River.
  - Township of Manistique
  - Manistique River
  - West Branch Manistique River
  - Manistique Lakes
- Meauwataka – Potawatomi word meaning "halfway", as the location is about halfway between Lake Mitchell and the Manistee River.
- Michigamme – Ojibwe word "mishigamaa" meaning "great water", also etymology for state of Michigan.
  - Township of Michigamme
  - Lake Michigamme
  - Michigamme River
  - Michigamme Reservoir
- Munising – Ojibwe word "minising" meaning "at the island".
  - Township of Munising
  - Munising Falls
- Mohawk – named after the Mohawk people.
  - Mohawk Lake
- Nahma – Ojibwe word "name" meaning "sturgeon".
- Naubinway – from an Ojibwe phrase naabinwe meaning "it echoes".
  - Shared with Naubinway Island.
- Neahtawanta – Odawa word "neahtawauta" meaning "placid waters".
- Negaunee – Ojibwe word "niigaaniinh" meaning "pioneer".
  - Township of Negaunee
- Nottawa – Algonquin word meaning "Iroquois".
  - Nottawa Township in Isabella County
  - Nottawa Township in St. Joseph County
  - Nottawa Creek
  - Nottawa Lake
- Nunda – Seneca word meaning "where the valley meets the hill".
- Oceola – after Osceola, a Seminole chief.
- Ocqueoc
  - Ocqueoc River
  - Ocqueoc Lake
  - Ocqueoc Falls
- Okemos – Ojibwe word "ogimaa" meaning "chief", also etymology of Ogemaw County.
- Omena – Ojibwe expression "o-me-nah" meaning "is that so?".
- Onaway – Indian word "onawa" meaning "awake".
- Oneida – named after the Oneida people.
- Onekama – Ojibwe word "onigamaa" meaning "singing water".
  - Township of Onekama Township, Michigan
- Onondaga – after the Onondaga people or Onondaga County, New York.
  - Township of Onondaga
- Onota – after the Oneida people of nearby Wisconsin.
- Ontwa – after an Indian maiden who lived in Detroit.
- Oshtemo – Potawatomi word meaning "headwaters".
  - Shared with the township of Oshtemo in Kalamazoo County.
- Ossineke – Indian word "zhingaabewasiniigigaabawaad" meaning "where the image stones stood".
  - Township of Ossineke
- Otisco – Indian word or unclear origin.
- Owosso – after Chief Wasso of the Ojibwe.
- Pinnebog - named for the eponymous river. Originally meant "partridge drum".
- Pokagon – after Chief Pokagon of the Potawatomi.
  - Village of Pokagon
- Petoskey – Odawa word "biidaasige" meaning "where the sun shines through the clouds".
- Pewamo – after Chief Pewamo.
- Pinconning – Ojibwe word "opinikaaning" meaning "place of potatoes".
  - Pinconning Township
  - Pinconning River
- Ponshewaing – Indian word meaning "peaceful waters" or "winter home".
- Pontiac – after Chief Pontiac of the Odawa.
- Quinnesec – Ojibwe word "bekweneseg" meaning "smoky".
- Sagola – derived from the local Indian word for "welcome"
  - Village of Sagola
- Sandusky – Wyandot word "saundustee" meaning "water".
- Saranac – Abenaki word "zalônák:tégw" meaning "staghorn sumac cone river".
- Saugatuck – Indian word "so'hktuk" meaning "river that pours out".
  - Township of Saugatuck
  - Saugatuck Dunes
- Scio
  - Township of Scio
- Sciota
- Sebewa – Ojibwe word ziibiwenh meaning "little creek".
  - Village of Sebewa
- Sebewaing – Ojibwe wird "ziibiiweng" meaning "river place".
  - Township of Sebewaing
  - Sebewaing River
- Seneca – after the Seneca people.
  - Township of Seneca
- Tamarack
  - Tamarack River
  - Tamarack Lake (Lower Peninsula)
  - Tamarack Lake (Upper Peninsula)
- Tawas City – after Chief O-ta-was.
  - City of East Tawas
  - Township of Tawas
  - Tawas River
  - Tawas Lake
- Tecumseh – after Chief Tecumseh of the Shawnee.
- Tittabawassee - from Ojibwe ditib-waasizo, meaning "rolling and sparkling river".
  - Tittabawassee River
- Tekonsha – Potawatomi word "tekonsho" meaning "resembling caribou".
  - Tekonsha Township
- Topinabee – after Chief Topinabee of the Potawatomi.
- Tuscarora – after the Tuscarora people.
- Unadilla – Iroquois word meaning "meeting place".
- Wabaningo – after Wabiwindego of the Grand River Odawa.
- Wakeshma – Potawatomi word of unknown meaning.
- Waucedah – Ojibwe word meaning "talking stream".
- Wawatam – after Wawatam, an Odawa chief.
- Weesaw – after Chief Weesaw of the Potawatomi.
- Wequetonsing – Odawa word wiikwedonsing meaning "at the head of the little bay".
- Wick-A-Te-Wah
- Wyoming – from the Munsee Delaware phrase xwé:wamənk, meaning "at the big river flat".
- Zeba – Ojibwe word "ziibi" meaning "river".

== Natural features ==
=== Bodies of water ===
- Aginaw Lake
- Canada Creek
- Caribou Lake
- Chicago Lake
- Chicagon Lake
- Copneconic Lake
- Gogomain River
- Goguac Lake
- Gook Creek
- Hugaboom Lake
- Kanause Lake
- Kinwamakwad Lake
- Kitch-iti-kipi
- Lake Chemung
- Lake Kawbawgam
- Lake Macatawa
  - Shared with the Macatawa River.
- Lake Manitou
  - Manitou Passage
  - Manitou Island in Lake Superior
  - North Manitou and South Manitou Islands in Lake Michigan
- Lake Minnewauken
- Lake Mitigwaki
- Lake Nepessing
- Lake Ponemah
- Lake Skegemog
- Manabezho Falls
- Manido Falls
- Milakokia River
  - Milakokia Lake
- Misteguay Creek
- Mitchigan River
- Munro Lake
- Munuscong Lake
  - Little Munuscong River
  - Munuscong River
  - Munuscong Island
- Muskallonge Lake
- Nawadaha Falls
- Nawakwa Lake
- O Kun de Kun Falls
- Peshekee River
- Petobego Pond – Anishinaabe word "bato-biigoo" meaning "sandy point".
- Potagannissing River
  - Potagannissing Bay
- Quanicassee River
- Saganing River
- Sauk River
- Shinanguag Lake
- Shupac Lake
- Siskiwit Lake
  - Siskiwit River
  - Big Siskiwit River
  - Little Siskiwit River
  - Siskiwit Falls
- Tacoosh River
- Tahquamenon River
  - Tahquamenon Falls
  - Tahquamenon Island
- Tepee Lake
- Tioga River
- Tonawanda Lake
- Waagaagamaa Lake
- Wabasis Lake
- Waiska River
  - Waiska Bay
- Wegwaas Lake

=== Islands ===
- Iyopawa Island
- Katechay Island
- Mamajuda Island
- Neebish Island – Ojibwe word "aniibiish" meaning "leaf".
- Naomikong Island
- Ojibwa Island
  - Ojibway Island (Sagniaw River)
- Waugoshance Island
  - Waugoshance Point

=== Other ===
- Katakitckon Indian Community
- Mino-kwe jiigibiik Beach
- Muscamoot Ridge

== See also ==
- List of place names in the United States of Native American origin
- List of place names in Canada of Indigenous origin
- List of Illinois placenames of Native American origin
- List of Indiana placenames of Native American origin
- List of Minnesota placenames of Native American origin
- List of Ohio placenames of Native American origin
- List of Wisconsin placenames of Native American origin
