= List of Wisconsin placenames of Native American origin =

The following list includes settlements, geographic features, and political subdivisions of Wisconsin whose names are derived from Native American languages.

== Listings ==
=== Counties ===
- Chippewa County – the Ojibwe (or Chippewa) people
  - City of Chippewa Falls
- Iowa County – the Iowa people
- Kenosha County – Kenosha (ginoozhe), an Ojibwe word meaning "pike" (fish)
  - City of Kenosha
- Kewaunee County – for either a Potawatomi word meaning "river of the lost" or an Ojibwe word meaning "prairie hen", "wild duck" or "to go around"
- Manitowoc County – Manitowoc (manidoowag) is an Ojibwe word meaning "spirits"
  - City of Manitowoc
- Menominee County – the Menominee people
- Milwaukee County – Algonquin word Millioke which means "The Good Land", or "Gathering place by the water". Another interpretation is "beautiful or pleasant lands".
  - City of Milwaukee
  - City of South Milwaukee
- Oneida County – named after the Oneida people.
- Outagamie County – the Outagamie (Meskwaki, Fox) people
- Ozaukee County – Ozaukee (Ozaagii) is the Ojibwe word for the Sauk people
- Sauk County – named after the Sauk people.
  - Sauk City
  - Saukville
- Waukesha County – Potawatomi word meaning "little foxes"
  - City of Waukesha
- Waupaca County – Menominee word meaning "white sand bottom" or "brave young hero"
- Waushara County – a Native American word meaning "good earth"
- Winnebago County – named after the Winnebago people.

=== Settlements ===
- Algoma
- Altoona
- Amnicon Falls
- Aniwa
- Antigo
- Arkansaw
- Ashippun
- Ashwaubenon
- Astico
- Aztalan
- Baraboo
- Carcajou
- Catawba
- Chetek
- Chenequa
- Chicago Junction
- Chippecotton, modern-day Racine (so-named Chippecotton or Kipiwaki, meaning "root"; Racine is French for "root")
- Coloma
- Couderay
- Dakota
- Horicon
- Huron
- Iola
- Kaukauna (named for early French settler pronunciation "Kakalin," and later Grand Kakalin, bastardized either from Menomonee Ogag-kane or O-gau-gau-ning, meaning "the place where fish stop" due to the massive amounts of fish they found where the river fell 52 feet beneath the falls. Because of the forceful rushing rapids, travelers were forced to carry their canoes around it)
- Kegonsa
- Kekoskee
- Keshena
- Kewaskum
- Kinnickinnic
- Koshkonong
- Koshkonong Mounds
- Lake Koshkonong
- Lake Nebagamon
- Lake Wisconsin
- Lake Wissota
- Manawa
- Manitowish Waters
- Mazomanie
- Menasha (from a Menominee phrase meaning "thorn in the island")
- Menomonee Falls
- Menomonie
- Mequon
- Merrimac
- Minnesota Junction (from Anishinaabe, meaning "azure waters")
- Minocqua
- Misha Mokwa (from Anishinaabe, meaning "great bear")
- Mishicot
- Monona
- Moquah
- Mosinee
- Mukwonago (from Potowatomi, meaning "a ladle/bend in the stream")
- Muscoda
- Muskego
- Nashotah
- Niagara
- Necedah
- Neda
- Neenah (from Winnebago Neenah, meaning "running water")
- Nekoosa
- Neopit
- Neosho
- Neshkoro
- Oconomowoc (from Potowatomi, meaning "waterfall")
- Oconto
  - Oconto Falls
- Odanah
- Ogema
- Okauchee Lake
- Onalaska
- Ono
- Ontario
- Oshkosh – Menominee Chief Oshkosh, whose name meant "claw" (cf. Ojibwe oshkanzh, "the claw").
- Osseo
- Otsego
- Penokee
- Peshtigo
- Pewaukee
- Pokegama
- Potosi
- Poy Sippi
- Poynette
- Requa
- Shawano
- Sheboygan (of obscure but likely Algonquian origins, it may derive from Shawb-wa-way-kum, meaning either "thundering under the ground" or "path between the lakes"; bastardized through French Cheboigan)
- Sheboygan Falls
- Sioux
- Suamico
- Tamarack
- Taycheedah
- Tichigan
- Tomahawk
- Viroqua
- Wabeno
- Waubeka
- Waucousta
- Waukesha (originally known by local tribes as Tshee-gas-cou-tak, meaning "burnt, fire-land", possibly later derived from Ojibwe Wagosh meaning "fox", or alternatively from a Chief "Leatherstrap" or "Wau-tsha", met by the early white settler Morris Cutler, who honored him with the namesake)
- Waumandee
- Waunakee – Waunakee is called Wanąǧi [wa-na-GHEE] in the Hocąk language, meaning "spirit", as in a spirit which has departed from the body. I was told by a tribal colleague that it was given this name due to the spirits who can sometimes be heard there at night, singing. Wanąǧi is attested in other Wisconsin place names as well: Wanąǧi Homįk ("where the spirit lies" or "cemetery") is the Hocąk name for Reesburg, WI.
- Waupaca
- Waupun (meaning "east, daybreak, dawn")
- Wausau (from Chippewa, meaning "far away")
- Wausaukee
- Wautoma
- Wauwatosa
- Weyauwega
- Winneboujou
- Winneconne
- Wisconsin Rapids
- Wonewoc
- Wyocena
- Wyoming (community)
- Wyoming, Iowa County
- Wyoming, Waupaca County
- Yuba

=== Bodies of water ===
- Ahnapee River
- Allequash Lake
- Amnicon Falls
- Amnicon River
- Aztalan State Park
- Baraboo River
- Big Muskellunge Lake
- Chequamegon-Nicolet National Forest
- Chequamegon Waters Flowage
- Cherokee Marsh – named after the Cherokee people.
- Chequamegon Bay
- Chicago Bay, Lake Chippewa
- Lake Chippewa
- Chippewa Falls
- Chippewa River (Wisconsin)
- Couderay River
- Lake Gogebic
- Gogebic Range
- Lake Horicon
- Horicon Marsh
- Iola Lake
- Lower Kaubashine Lake
- Upper Kaubashine Lake
- Lake Kawaguesaga
- Lake Kegonsa
- Kentuck Lake
- Kewaskum Woods
- Kickapoo River
- Kickapoo Woods
- Kinnickinnic River (Milwaukee River)
- Kinnickinnic River (St. Croix River)
- Koshkonong Mounds
- Lake Koshkonong
- Kurikka Creek
- Lenawee Creek
- Lake Leota
- Linnunpuro Creek
- Little Muskie Lake
- Machickanee Flowage
- Manitou Island (Wisconsin)
- Manitowish Lake
- Manitowoc River
- Maunesha River
- Mawikwe Bay
- Mecan River
- Lake Mendota
- Menominee Creek
- Little Menominee River
- Menominee River
- Michigan Island
- Milwaukee Bay, Lake Chippewa
- Milwaukee Bay, Lake Michigan
- Milwaukee River
- Lake Minocqua
- Minong Flowage
- Misha-Mokwa (Mother Bear) Trail
- Moccasin Lake
- Lake Mohawksin
- Lake Monona
- Muskego Lake
- Little Muskego Lake
- Musky Bay, Lake Chippewa
- Nagamicka Lake
- Naga-waukee Park
- Lake Namakagon
- Namekagon River
- Lake Nebagamon
- Lower Nemahbin Lake
- Upper Nemahbin Lake
- Nemadji River
- Neopit Mill Pond
- Lake Nokomis
- Oconomowoc Lake
- Okauchee Lake
- Oneida Lake
- Papkee Lake
- Papoose Creek
- Pecatonica River
- Pesabic Lake
- Peshtigo River
- Pewaukee Lake
- Pokegama Lake
- Puckaway Lake
- Sauk Prairie
- Scuppernong Prairie
- Shawano Lake
- Sheboygan Marsh
- Sheboygan River
- Sinissippi Lake
- Sinsinawa River
- Siskiwit Bay
- Siskiwit Lake (Wisconsin)
- Siskiwit River
- Skanawan Creek
- Squaw Creek (Wisconsin)
- Squaw Lake (Wisconsin)
- Tamarack Creek
- Taycheedah Creek
- Tichigan Forest (Wildlife Area)
- Tichigan Lake
- Token Creek (Tokaunee Creek)
- Totagatic Lake
- Totagatic River
- Tourtillotte Creek
- Lake Towanda
- Lake Wandawega
- Wayka Creek
- Lake Waubesa
- Waunakee Marsh
- Waupee Lake
- Waupee Swamp
- Wauzeka Bottoms
- Lake Wingra
- Lake Winnebago
- Lake Wisconsin
- Lake Wissota
- Wyalusing Forest
- Wyona Lake
- Yahara River
- Yawkey Lake

== See also ==
- List of place names in the United States of Native American origin
- List of Michigan placenames of Native American origin
- List of Illinois placenames of Native American origin
- List of Minnesota placenames of Native American origin
- List of Iowa placenames of Native American origin
