= List of Indiana placenames of Native American origin =

Many places throughout the state of Indiana take their names from Native American indigenous languages. This list includes rivers, lakes, counties, townships and towns. Some of the names have been anglicized, while others have been translated into English or French.

The primary Native American languages in Indiana are Miami-Illinois and Potawatomi; the largest number of place names on this list are from these two languages. Some place names are derived from other native languages, such as Kickapoo, Shawnee, and the Delaware languages Munsee and Unami. These are all Algonquian languages.

This list also includes names of ultimate Native American origin even if they were not used by Native Americans as place names in Indiana, such as Osceola and Wanatah, which were named by white settlers in honor of Seminole and Dakota leaders respectively.

The name of Indiana means 'land of the Indians' or "Indian Land."

== Indigenous Tribes of Indiana ==
- Miami
- Wea - The Wea were a Miami-Illinois-speaking people.
- Piankeshaw - The Piankeshaw, Piankashaw or Pianguichia Peoples are members of the Miami Indians.
- Potawatomi - The Potawatomi call themselves Neshnabé.
- Kickapoo - The Kickapoo People (Kickapoo: Kiikaapoa or Kiikaapoi) are an Algonquian-speaking people.
- Mascouten
- Shawnee, post 1794
- Delaware, post 1818

== Places ==
=== A ===
- Anderson was named for the Delaware leader Chief William Anderson who lived there.
- Aubbeenaubbee was a leader among the Potawatomi in the Lake Maxinkuckee area, and together with Metea led the negotiations in the 1826 Treaty of Mississinewas. He was born in 1760.
  - Aubbeenaubbee Township, Fulton County, Indiana, Potawatomi Indian village known as Aubenaubee in Jackson Township, Elkhart County.
  - Aub-ben-naub-Bee Reserve, near Lake Maxinkuckee.

=== B ===
- Baugo is a shortening of "Baubaugo", which is claimed by some local historians to be a Potawatomi word meaning "devil" or "devil river", referring to the intensity of its floods.
  - Baugo Creek, in Elkhart County
  - Baugo Township, Elkhart County, Indiana

=== C ===
- Cayuga, Indiana, located in Vermillion County is named after Cayuga, New York, which in turn is named after the Cayuga people.
- Cedar Creek (Indiana), translated from Potawatomi mskwawak-zibə.

=== D ===
- Delaware – is for the Delaware or Lenape people, who came to central Indiana in the late 18th century.
  - Delaware County, Indiana

=== E ===
- Elkhart - from "Elks-heart", translation of Potawatomi mzewəodeʔig ("at the elk heart"), borrowed in turn from Miami-Illinois mihšiiwiateehi ("elk's heart"). The name dates to at least the mid-18th century but may be considerably older.
  - Elkhart, Indiana
  - Elkhart County, Indiana
  - Elkhart Township, Noble County, Indiana
  - Elkhart River
- Eel River (White River tributary) is a translation of the Miami-Illinois kineepikomeekwa siipiiwi, which may have referred to a historic band of Miami known as "Eels" who at one time lived on the Eel River.
- Erie Township, Miami County, Indiana is named for the Erie people, native to the Ohio, Pennsylvania and New York area.

=== F ===
- Fish Lake, Indiana - translated from kiteepihkwanonki ("at the buffalo fish"), probably via French Lac Tipiconeau ("buffalo fish lake").

=== H ===
- Huron, Indiana - Named for Huron, Ohio, which comes from the Huron people.

=== I ===
- Iroquois - During the Beaver Wars the Iroquois Confederation campaigned in Indiana and Illinois. In 1680, La Salle labeled the confluence of the Kankakee and Iroquois rivers as La Fourche des Iroquois ("the Forks of the Iroquois"), likely indicating some association between that spot and the Iroquois raid on the Grand Kaskaskia Village in 1680.
  - Iroquois River was named after the Forks of the Iroquois in 1683.
  - Iroquois Township, Newton County, Indiana is named for the Iroquois River

=== K ===
- Kankakee River - From a Miami-Illinois word teeyaahkiki, meaning: "Open country/exposed land/land in open/land exposed to view", in reference to the area's prior status as a marsh.
- Kewanna - Named for Kee-Wau-Nay, a Potawatomi chief. The name means "prairie chicken", and in modern Potawatomi is written giwani.
- Kokomo - Probably borrowed from the Miami-Illinois personal name mahkookima ("bear chief").
  - Kokomo, Indiana
  - Indiana University Kokomo

=== M ===
- The Maumee River, historically also known as the "Miami" in United States treaties with Native Americans, is an anglicized spelling of the Ottawa or Odawa name for the Miami people, (o)maamii. An Odawa village was located near the mouth of the Maumee in present-day Ohio. The Miami in their turn called the river the "Odawa river" taawaawa siipiwi.
- Lake Maxinkuckee is from the Miami-Illinois term meenkahsenahkiki ("it is big-stone country"). The Potawatomi version of the name was recorded by Jacob Piatt Dunn as Mŏgsĭ́nkiki, which appears to be a borrowing from Miami-Illinois, as it does not correspond to any known Potawatomi words.
- Metea is named for the Potawatomi warrior and leader Metea (1778–1827), whose name in Potawatomi means "to sulk".
- Miami - named for the Miami, a Native American people, many of whom still live in this area.
  - Miami County, Indiana
  - Great Miami River
- Michigan, borrowed via French from names meaning "great water" in one or more Algonquian languages, likely with particularly heavy influence from Old Potawatomi *mesigam.
  - Lake Michigan
  - Michigan Road
  - Michigan City, Indiana
- Mississinewa River - from the Miami-Illinois name for this river, nimačihsinwi ("it lies on an incline").
- Mishawaka - from Potawatomi and Miami-Illinois placenames meaning "firewood-tree land", referring to the large number of standing dead trees in the area.
- Mongo - shortened from Mongoquinong, representing maankwahkionka ("in the loon land"), which was the name of one of the Miami signatories of the 1840 Treaty of the Wabash.
- Monon first landed on the map as the name of Big Monon Creek, a tributary of the Tippecanoe River. The creek's name is also recorded in early 19th-century sources as Metamonoung and Old Woman's River. The name may derive from the Old Potawatomi term mdamənəg ("at the corn", modern Potawatomi mdamnəg), which may have been a Potawatomi re-analysis of the Kickapoo place name metemooheki ("at the old woman's place"). The Kickapoo lived in the area near the creek in the 18th century.
  - Monon Bell
  - Monon Corridor
  - Monon, Indiana
  - Monon Township, White County, Indiana
  - The Monon Railroad was named based on an incorrect belief that "monong" was a Potawatomi word meaning "swift running" or "carry".
  - Monon Trail
- Muncie, originally Munsee Town, from the name of the Munsee Delaware people, originally from Munsee mənʼsi·w.

=== N ===
- Nappanee, Indiana - from Napanee, Ontario, from the Napanee River (originally Appenee), of unclear origin.

=== O ===
- Ohio River comes from the Seneca, Ohi:yo', lit. "Good River".
- Osceola, Indiana was named after Osceola, leader of the Seminole.
- Ouiatenon (Miami-Illinois: waayaahtanonki) was a dwelling place of members of the Wea tribe of Native Americans? (See Wea below)
  - Fort Ouiatenon is located along the Wabash River.

=== P ===
- Patoka River is likely from the Miami-Illinois word paatohka, "Comanche", which appears as a personal name in some historical records. It may also be from the Munsee péhtakəw ("it thunders"), referring to the noisy waterfall at Jasper, Indiana.
- Pottawattamie Park, Indiana is named for the Potawatomi, who occupied this area when it was settled.

=== S ===
- Salamonie is from the Miami-Illinois oonsaalamooni ("yellow ocher"), which referred either to limonite or to the bloodroot plant that grew along the Salamonie River.
  - Salamonie River
  - Salamonie Township, Huntington County, Indiana is named for the Salamonie River.
- Shawnee is from the Shawnee people
  - Shawnee Township, Fountain County, Indiana
- Shipshewana - named after Potawatomi Chief Shipshewana

=== T ===
- Tippecanoe - from the Miami-Illinois word for buffalo fish, reconstructed as *kiteepihkwana.
  - Tippecanoe County, Indiana
  - Tippecanoe Lake, Kosciusko County.
  - Tippecanoe River
  - Tippecanoe Township, Kosciusko County, Indiana is named for Tippecanoe River.
  - Tippecanoe Township, Carroll County, Indiana is named for Tippecanoe River.
  - Tippecanoe Township, Tippecanoe County, Indiana is named for Tippecanoe River.
- Trail Creek - translated from Potawatomi myewes-zibiwe, possibly via French Rivière du Chemin
  - Trail Creek (Lake Michigan)
  - Trail Creek, Indiana is named after the creek

=== V ===
- Vermillion - Likely translated from Piankashaw (Miami-Illinois) *oonsaalamooni ("yellow ocher" or limonite) via French le grand vermillon jaune ("the big yellow ocher [river]").
  - Vermilion River (also spelled Vermillion)
  - Vermillion County, Indiana is named after the river
  - Vermillion Township, Vermillion County, Indiana is named after the river

=== W ===
- Wabash - Named after the Wabash River, from a Miami Indian word, waapaahšiiki, meaning "it shines white", "pure white", or "water over white stones"
  - Wabash, Indiana
  - Wabash County, Indiana
  - Wabash Township, Fountain County, Indiana is named for the Wabash River.
  - Wabash Township, Jay County, Indiana is named for the Wabash River.
  - Wabash Township, Tippecanoe County, Indiana is named for Wabash River.
- Wakarusa, Indiana is named after the Wakarusa River in Kansas.
- Wanatah - named after the Dakota chief Wanata, meaning "He who Charges His Enemies" or "The Charger".
- Wapahani was once believed to be the Delaware name for the White River, but is actually an ungrammatical combination of two Unami language words, and was described by a native speaker of Unami as "a made-up word".
  - Wapahani High School
- Lake Wawasee - named for Miami chief Wawasee (Wau-wuh-see), brother of Miami chief Papakeecha, which translated means "Flat Belly."
- Wea is from the Miami speaking group of native peoples living along the Wabash River around Lafayette, Indiana. The French spelling is Oui, see Ouiatenon above.
  - Wea Township, Tippecanoe County, Indiana
- White River (Indiana) is a translation of the Miami-Illinois waapikaminki ("at the white waters"), possibly a reference to the rapids at Broad Ripple.
- Winamac, Indiana, is named for Winamac a Potawatomi chief. The word is said to mean "catfish."
- Wyandot or Wyandotte - From Wyandot people, also known historically as the Huron.
  - Wyandot, Indiana
  - Wyandotte Cave
  - Wyandotte, Indiana took its name from Wyandotte Cave.

=== Y ===
- Yellow River (Indiana) - translation of Miami-Illinois oonsasiipi ("yellow river") or Potawatomi wezawgəməg ("at the yellow water").

== See also ==
- List of place names in the United States of Native American origin
- List of placenames of indigenous origin in the Americas
- Native Americans in the United States
- List of Illinois placenames of Native American origin
- List of Michigan placenames of Native American origin
- List of Ohio placenames of Native American origin
