= List of Ohio placenames of Native American origin =

The following list includes settlements, geographic features, and political subdivisions of Ohio whose names are derived from Native American languages.

== Listings ==
=== State ===
- Ohio – from Seneca ohi:yo’, "beautiful river".
  - Ohio River

=== Counties ===
- Ashtabula County – from Lenape ashtepihəle, 'always enough (fish) to go around, to be given away'; contraction from apchi 'always' + tepi 'enough' + həle (verb of motion).
  - City of Ashtabula
  - Ashtabula River
- Coshocton County – derived from Unami Lenape Koshaxkink 'where there is a river crossing', probably adapted as Koshaxktun 'ferry' ('river-crossing device').
  - Coshocton
- Cuyahoga County – originally Mohawk Cayagaga 'crooked river', possibly related to kayuha 'creek' or kahyonhowanen 'river'.
  - Cuyahoga River
- Erie County
- Geauga County – Onondaga jyo’ä·gak, Seneca jo’ä·ka’, 'raccoon' (originally the name of the Grand River).
- Hocking County
- Licking County
- Mahoning County
- Miami County
  - Great Miami River
- Muskingum County – Shawnee Mshkikwam 'swampy ground' (mshkikwi- 'swamp' + -am 'earth');
  - Muskingum River
- Ottawa County
- Pickaway County - Shawnee. Variant of the name of one of their subtribes, Pekowi.
- Sandusky County – from Wyandot saandusti meaning 'water (within water-pools)' or from andusti 'cold water'.
  - City of Sandusky
  - Sandusky Bay
  - Sandusky River
- Scioto County – derived from Wyandot skɛnǫ·tǫ’, 'deer' (compare Shenandoah, also derived from the word for deer in a related Iroquoian language).
  - Scioto River
- Seneca County
  - Senecaville
- Tuscarawas County – after the Iroquoian Tuscarora people, who at one time had a settlement along the river of that name.
  - Tuscarawas
  - Tuscarawas River
- Wyandot County

=== Settlements ===
- Catawba Island - Name of a Siouan speaking tribe from North Carolina who participated in many wars and conflicts, some of which being in Ohio.
- Chickasaw - name of a tribe from Kentucky and Tennessee.
- Chillicothe - Shawnee. Chalakatha, one of the Shawnee bands.
- Chippewa Lake
- Choctaw Lake - name of a tribe from Mississippi.
- Conneaut
- Guyan - Shortened from French name for an Iroquoian Native tribe from West Virginia who were later absorbed into the Ohio Seneca—the Guyandotte (Also Little Mingo, Tiontatecaga. Not to be confused with Wyandot.)
- Metamora - Wampanoag?. Name comes from a play about a Native American from the Wampanoag people of New England.
- Mingo Junction - Mingo is common nickname for the Ohio Seneca people. Variant of Mingwe, what the Lenape once called the related Susquehannock Indians of Pennsylvania.
- Mississinawa - Miami. Name of a river tributary to the Wabash. From nimacihsinwi, "it lies on a slope."
- Montezuma - named for the last Tlatoani (Emperor) of the Aztec Empire, Moctezuma II.
- Nimishillen - Lenape. from Ni + Missilla, or Waters of the Black Alder.
- Ontario - Huron/ Wyandot. Named for Lake Ontario. Comes from Huron word which means Lake.
- Pataskala - Lenape. Unknown (May be of Siouan origin?)
- Piqua – Shawnee Pekowi, name of one of the five divisions of the Shawnee.
- Pusheta - Shawnee. Named after a local Chief.
  - Pusheta Creek
- Powhatan Point - name of an Algonquian tribe from Virginia. The first Shawnee split away from them in the mid-1600s.
- Shawnee - Named for the Shawnee people
  - Shawnee Hills (Greene County)
  - Shawnee Hills (Delaware County)
- Texas - Named for the state, which derives its name from taysha, in Caddoan Native American language. Allegedly means friend.
- Tontogany - Named after a local Chief. Most likely of Wyandot origin.
- Tymochtee - Wyandot. Allegedly means 'stream around the plains.'
- Wabash - Common name of a tribe from Indiana
  - Wabash River
- Wapakoneta – from Shawnee Wa·po’kanite 'Place of White Bones' (wa·pa 'white'+(h)o’kani 'bone'+-ite locative suffix).
- Wauseon - Odawa. Named for Chief among the Potowatomi.

=== Bodies of water ===
- Kinnikinnick Creek - Algonquian origin, multiple Tribes. Word refers to a person's personal smoking tobacco mix, or any plant someone would mix with their own tobacco for flavor, medicinal purposes or to extend the life of their personal tobacco supply. Can also refer to a specific plant in English, known As Kinnikinnick in the Eastern US, Bear berry in Canada and Manzanita on the West Coast.
- Kokosing River - Lenape. From Gokhos + -ing, generally translating to "Owl, here."
- Lake Erie
- Lake Mohawk - Named after tribe of the Iroquois Confederacy.
- Mahoning River - Lenape. Allegedly means "Upon here is a deer lick," but this may be incorrect. May come from Ma + aney + -ing, or, roughly, "There is the path."
  - Mahoning Valley
- Maumee River - Miami. A nickname or spelling variant for the Miami people.
- Mohican River - Name of an Algonquian tribe from New York who were closely related to the Lenape.
- Olentangy River - Lenape. Allegedly, river of red paint.
- Pymatuning Lake – Lenape. Either corruption or variation on the word, "Pemuteneyig." Likely translation could be, "Upon this place, Towns are near." Or it could be a reference to the sweat-lodge of a hunting camp. According to etymologist August C. Mahr it's from the Munsee dialect of Lenape word Piim/'attoon/'nk meaning 'sweating oneself, it is put here,' or, in idiomatic English 'here are facilities for sweating oneself.' The Moravian missionary John Heckewelder gives a similar etymology for Pomonkey Creek in Maryland.
- Shenango River – Seneca. Possibly from gesho:ne:gwa:h (keh-s-hoh-ney-g-wah) which means something along the lines of "It's right behind me."
- Walhonding River - Lenape. Unknown

== See also ==
- List of place names in the United States of Native American origin
- List of placenames of indigenous origin in the Americas
- List of Indiana placenames of Native American origin
- List of Michigan placenames of Native American origin
- List of place names of Native American origin in Pennsylvania
