= Iuka =

Iuka /aɪˈjuːkə/ may refer to several places and things named after Chief Iuka of the Chickasaw:

- Iuka, Arkansas, a village in Izard County
- Iuka, Illinois, a village in Marion County
- Iuka Township, Marion County, Illinois
- Iuka, Kansas, a city in Pratt County
- Iuka, Kentucky, a village in Livingston County
- Iuka, Mississippi, a city in Tishomingo County
  - Battle of Iuka, 1862
  - Iuka order of battle
- Iuka, West Virginia
- Iuka Normal Institute, a former school (1882-1902) in Iuka, Mississippi
- USS Iuka, several ships

== See also ==
- Iuka Springs, Missouri
