= Potagannissing River =

River on Drummond Island, Michigan, United States

Location
- Country: United States
- State: Michigan
- County: Chippewa

Physical characteristics
- Source
  - location: Drummond Island, Michigan, U.S.
  - coordinates: 45°58′49″N 83°34′01″W
- Mouth: Potagannissing Bay
  - coordinates: 46°02′17″N 83°40′12″W
- Length: 11.3 mi (18.2 km)

Basin features
- GNIS ID: U.S. Geological Survey Geographic Names Information System: Potagannissing River

The Potagannissing River (/pəˌtæɡəˈniːsɪŋ/ pə-TAG-ə-NEESS-ing; Ojibwe: Bootaagan-minising-ziibi) is an 11.3-mile (18.2 km) river on Drummond Island in Chippewa County, Michigan, United States. It drains a short chain of inland lakes—locally known as First, Second, Third, and Fourth—before entering Potagannissing Bay on Lake Huron.

== Course ==
The river rises in the interior of Drummond Island and flows northwest through the four-lake chain—First through Fourth Lakes—then continues a short distance to Potagannissing Bay. Source and mouth coordinates are recorded by the Geographic Names Information System (GNIS).

== Geology and physiography ==
Drummond Island occupies the eastern end of Michigan’s Niagara Escarpment and supports extensive alvar—grassland and savanna over flat limestone/dolostone pavement with thin soils (including the Maxton Plains complex). The river’s short drop and broad wetlands reflect this low-relief carbonate platform, with impounded marsh and shallow lakes forming much of the headwaters area.

== Management and modifications ==
A low dam constructed in 1947 created and stabilized marsh habitat within what is now the Potagannissing Flooding State Wildlife Management Area but impeded upstream fish passage. A 1999 fish ladder did not function as intended for northern pike. In 2006 the state lowered the dam crest and installed rock-ramp weirs to restore fish passage while maintaining upstream water levels. Project partners included the Michigan DNR, the Drummond Island Sportsmen’s Club, and the U.S. Fish and Wildlife Service’s National Fish Passage Program.

== Ecology ==
The flooding and adjacent wetlands support breeding and migratory waterfowl and provide spawning and rearing habitat for northern pike and other warmwater fishes. Emergent marsh surrounds much of the lake chain, with upland alvar and conifer stands nearby. The river mouth lies near Harbor Island National Wildlife Refuge, within Potagannissing Bay.

== Recreation and access ==
Public access to the flooding and lake chain is provided at First Lake, where the Michigan DNR maintains a gravel boat launch and parking area. Paddling on the lakes and connecting river reaches is common in ice-free months. Angling regulations include a seasonal spring closure for the reach from Potagannissing Dam downstream to Maxton Road; dates are set in the annual state fishing guide.

== Mapping and data ==
The river’s course and named features are recorded by the USGS in the Geographic Names Information System (feature ID 635333) and in the National Hydrography Dataset, which lists the mainstem length as 11.3 miles (18.2 km).

== Etymology ==
The Anishinaabe name for Drummond Island is Bootaagan-minising, and related water-body forms use the heads ziibi (“river”) and wiikwed (“bay”). Reliable Ojibwe dictionaries gloss the components as: bootaagan (“a mortar for wild rice”), minis/minisi (“island”), ziibi (“river”), and wiikwed (“bay”). A rendering in popular sources as “(river by the) Mill Island” reflects the bootaagan-minising morphology but lacks a published linguistic or tribal citation. A translation of Potagannissing or Bootaagan-minising-wiikwed as “bay of many bays” is also repeated informally; no published linguistic or tribal source has been identified for that wording.

== See also ==
- List of rivers of Michigan
