= Siskiwit Lake (Isle Royale) =

Lake on Isle Royale in Michigan, United States

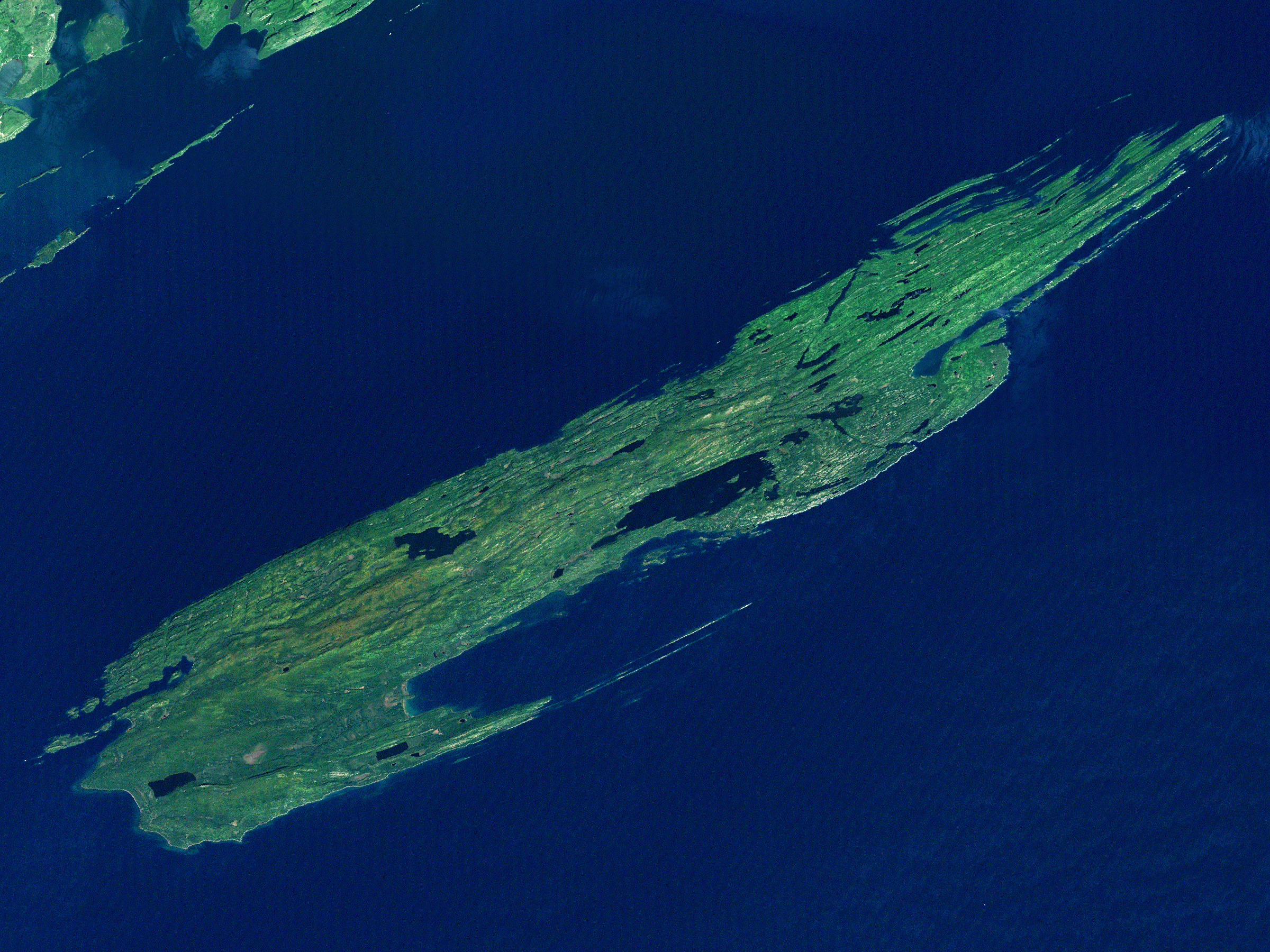
- Isle Royale. Siskiwit Lake is the dark patch in the center

- Location within Michigan
- Location: Isle Royale
- Coordinates: 48°00′05″N 088°47′50″W
- Primary outflows: Siskiwit River
- Basin countries: United States
- Surface area: 4,150 acres (16.8 km^{2})
- Surface elevation: 646 ft (197 m)
- Islands: Ryan

Siskiwit Lake (/ˈsɪskəwɪt/ SISS-kə-wit) is the largest lake on Isle Royale in Lake Superior. 4,150 acres (16.8 km^{2}) in area, the lake has cold, clear water which is relatively low in nutrients. Tributaries include the Little Siskiwit River, and the lake's outlet is the Siskiwit River which flows into Lake Superior.

Siskiwit Lake is available for fishing, with restrictions (no motorized boats, no natural bait). Lake Trout, Brook Trout, Rainbow Trout, and Yellow Perch are found in the lake. A 2004 study of toxaphene concentrations found that concentrations were lower in Siskiwit Lake trout than in Lake Superior trout, possibly due to shorter food chains and greater reliance on zooplankton or other pelagic invertebrates.

Siskiwit Lake contains several lake islands, including Eagle Nest Island, Teakettle Island, Lost and Found Island, and Ryan Island (the largest). Common loons nest and breed on some of these islands.

Siskiwit Lake and Ryan Island were part of the Moose Boulder hoax, which claimed that there was an exposed boulder in a seasonal pond on Ryan Island. This would have made that boulder the largest "island" in the largest "lake" on the largest island in the largest lake on the largest island in the largest lake, but in 2020 this was confirmed to be a hoax: Ryan Island has no such pond.

== See also ==
- List of lakes in Michigan
- Recursive islands and lakes
