= Main Stay Therapeutic Farm =

Non-profit organization in the United States

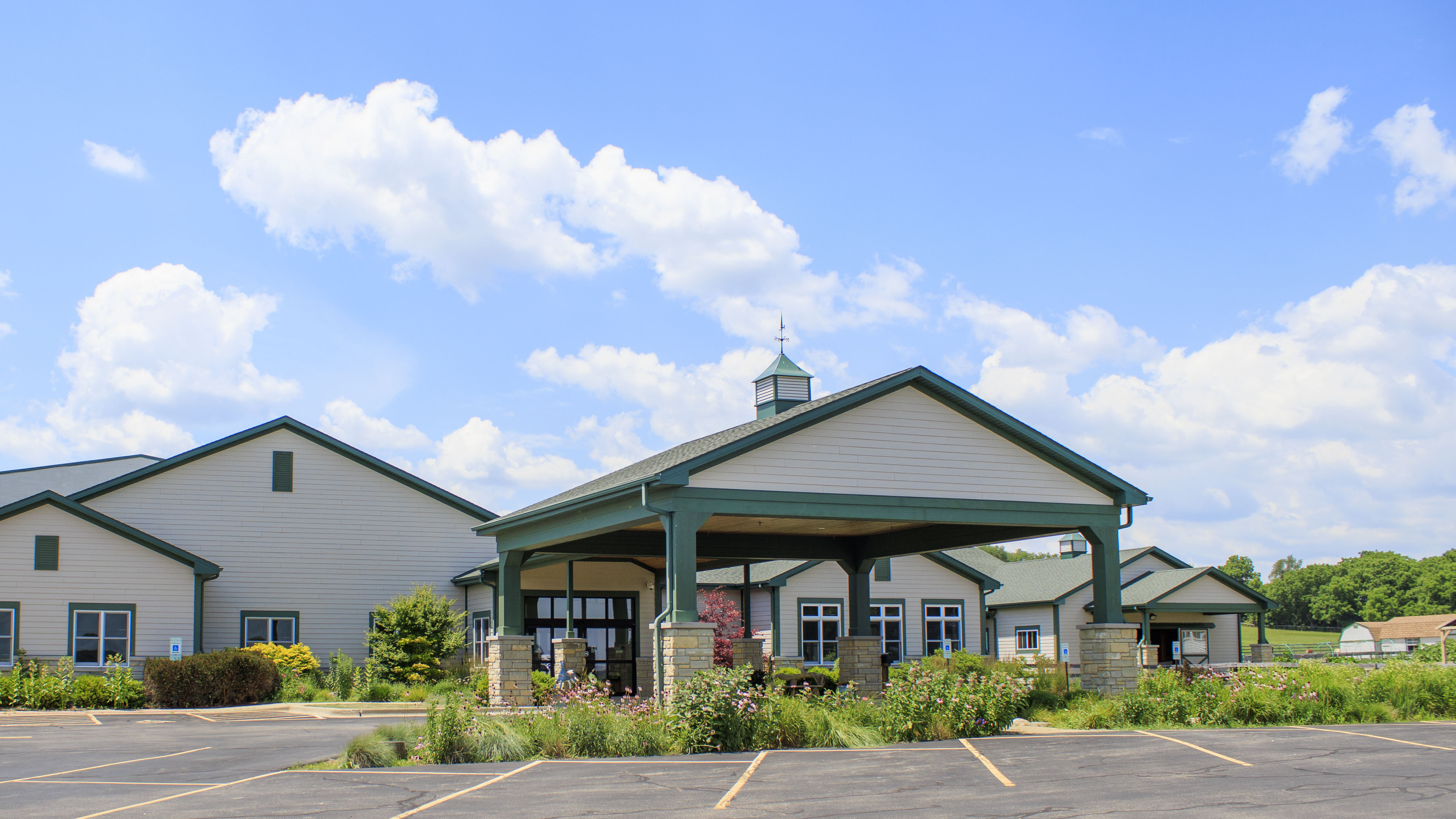
- Main Stay's facility front entrance
- Founded: 1987-11-07
- Founder: Sara Foszcz
- Type: 501(c)(3) nonprofit
- Tax ID no.: 36-3565747
- Purpose: Social services
- Location: Richmond, Illinois, United States
- Region served: McHenry County, Illinois, and surrounding areas
- Website: mainstayfarm.org

Main Stay Therapeutic Farm is a nonprofit social services organization based in Richmond, Illinois, United States, offering equine and animal-assisted services and nature-based programs.

== History ==
Main Stay was founded in 1987 by equestrian Sara Foszcz and physical therapist Sandy Barcus to support children with disabilities through therapeutic riding.

In 2014, Main Stay became the first nonprofit in McHenry County, Illinois and within the Hackmatack National Wildlife Refuge boundary to place its land in a permanent conservation land easement with The Land Conservancy of McHenry County, ensuring protection of the land in perpetuity.

In 2016, Main Stay began construction of a new 37,000-square-foot facility, including a 20-stall barn, indoor riding arena, and accessible program areas designed to support year-round services.

In 2017, Main Stay partnered with McHenry Community High School District 156 to introduce a pilot experiential learning program designed for at-risk students, providing an alternative to detention and suspension. Main Stay also partnered with Meridian Health to address gaps in mental healthcare.

== Recognition ==
In 2023, Main Stay's therapeutic riding horse, Kay, received a Region 7 Equine of the Year by PATH Intl., which annually recognizes equines for outstanding service at therapeutic riding centers in the United States.

== Governance and funding ==
Main Stay Therapeutic Farm operates as a 501(c)(3) public charity (EIN 36-3565747).

In 2025, the organization received a competitive grant from the Community Foundation for McHenry County.

== See also ==
- Conservation easement
