= List of Illinois placenames of Native American origin =

The following list includes settlements, geographic features, and political subdivisions of Illinois whose names are derived from Native American languages.

== Listings ==
=== State ===
- Illinois – from the French rendering of an Algonquian (perhaps Miami) word apparently meaning "s/he speaks normally" (cf. Miami ilenweewa), from Proto-Algonquian *elen-, "ordinary" + -wē, "to speak", referring to the Illiniwek.

=== Counties ===
- Iroquois County – Named after the Iroquois Indian tribe.
  - City of Iroquois
  - Iroquois Township
  - Iroquois River
  - Iroquois County State Wildlife Area
- Kankakee County
  - City of Kankakee
  - Kankakee Township
  - Kankakee River
  - Kankakee River State Park
- Macoupin County – Miami-Illinois term for the American lotus
  - Macoupin Creek
- Peoria County – named after the Peoria Tribe which previously lived in the area
  - City of East Peoria
  - City of Peoria
  - City of Peoria Heights
  - City of West Peoria
- Sangamon County – from a Pottawatomie word Sain-guee-mon meaning "where there is plenty to eat."
  - City of Sangamon
  - Sangamon River
- Wabash County – The name "Wabash" is an English spelling of "Wabashike," (pronounced "Wah-bah-she-keh"), the Miami word for "pure white."
  - City of Wabash Point
  - Wabash River
  - Little Wabash River
- Winnebago County
  - Winnebago

=== Settlements ===
- Algonquin
- Aptakisic – named for Chief Optagushick of the Potawatomi tribe; means "Half Day," or "sun at the center of the sky"
- Ashkum – name originated from Chief Ashkum of the Potawatomi Indians
- Cahokia – refers to the Cahokia people whose village was located nearby
  - Cahokia Township
- Chautauqua
- Chebanse – "Chebanse" derives from zhishibéns, meaning "the little duck" in the Potawatomi language
  - Chebanse Township
- Chenoa
- Chicago – for the Miami-Illinois word Shikaakwa, wild leek.
  - City of Chicago Heights
  - Village of Chicago Ridge
  - Chicago River
- Chillicothe – comes from the name of the Chalagawtha sept of the Shawnee nation
  - Chillicothe Township
- Colusa
- Dakota
  - Dakota Township
- DuQuoin – named after Chief Jean Baptiste DuQuoin (sometimes DuQuoigne) of the Kaskaskia tribe.
- Erie – named after Erie County, New York which in turn was named after Lake Erie. The lake was named by the Erie people, a Native American people who lived along its southern shore. The tribal name "erie" is a shortened form of the Iroquoian word erielhonan, meaning "long tail"
  - Erie Township
  - Village of Mount Erie
- Genesee – from the Iroquois word Genesee, meaning "shining valley" or "beautiful valley"
- Geneseo – "Geneseo" is a variation of the Iroquois word Genesee, meaning "shining valley" or "beautiful valley"
  - Geneseo Township
- Half Day – named after Potawatomi Chief Aptakisic, the chief at the time the area was settled. The name, meaning "sun at meridian", was anglicized as "Half Day".
- Illini
  - Illini State Park
- Illiopolis – The name was formed from Illinois and -polis, a Greek suffix meaning "city".
  - Illiopolis Township
- Iuka – named after the Chickasaw Indian Chief Iuka
- Kansas – named by the French after the Kansas, Omaha, Kaw, Osage and Dakota Sioux Indian word "KaNze" meaning, in the Kansas language, "south wind."
  - Kansas Township (Edgar County)
  - Kansas Township (Woodford County)
- Kaskaskia – named for the Kaskaskia people whose village was located nearby.
  - Kaskaskia Township
  - Kaskaskia River
  - Kaskaskia River State Fish and Wildlife Area
- Kewanee – "Kewanee" is the Winnebago word for greater prairie chicken
  - Kewanee Township
- Kickapoo – named after the Kickapoo people
  - Kickapoo Township
- Mackinaw – Mackinaw (sometimes spelled Mackinac) is derived from the Ojibwe word mikinaak meaning "turtle".
  - Mackinaw River
  - Mackinaw River State Fish and Wildlife Area
  - Little Mackinaw River
- Mahomet – after Mahomet Weyonomon, a tribal chieftain from Connecticut
- Maquon – from the Algonquian language A-ma-quon-sip-pi, Amaquon meaning mussel, or mussel shell
- Maroa – named after the Maroa Indians
- Mascoutah – a derivative of the Mascouten tribe.
- Mendota – The name "Mendota" is derived from a Native American word meaning "junction of two trails".
- Menominee – Named after the Menominee Indian tribe.
  - Menominee River
  - Little Menominee River
- Merrimac – name taken from the nearby Meramec River whose name was translated as 'Ugly Water' from Algonquian by French Jesuits in the area. However, scholars of the language translate it as 'place of strong current.'
- Mettawa – named for a nearby Potawatomi settlement
- Minonk – from the Ojibwe word meaning “a good place” or from the Mohican word meaning “high point”.
- Minooka
- Mokena – a name derived from a Native American language meaning "mud turtle"
- Moweaqua
- Nachusa
  - Nachusa Township
- Nekoma
- Neoga – Neoga means "deer" in the Kickapoo language
- Neponset
- Nokomis
- Oconee – named after the daughter of a local Indian chieftain
- Ohio
- Okawville
- Omaha
- Oneco
- Oneida – named after the Oneida people
- Onarga
- Oquawka
- Oskaloosa
- Ottawa – named after the Odawa people
- Owaneco
- Panama
- Panola – a Native American word for cotton
- Patoka – named after a local Indian chieftain
- Pawnee – named after the Pawnee people
- Pecatonica – The word Pecatonica is an anglicization of two Algonquian language words; Bekaa (or Pekaa in some dialects), which means slow and niba, which means water; forming the conjunction Bekaaniba or Slow Water.
- Peotone – Derived from the Potawatomi language meaning "come here".
- Pesotum
- Pistakee Highlands – "pistakee" comes from the Algonquin word for buffalo
- Pocahontas – named after famous Native American Pochahontas.
- Ponemah - means "heaven" in Anishinaabe
- Pontiac – named after Pontiac, an Odawa war chief
- Pontoosuc
- Potomac – originally named Marysville after the wives of the two founders, John Smith and Isaac Meneley, who started businesses here circa 1840. On May 13, 1871, a post office was established at the town and was named Potomac, most likely after the Potomac River. The town's name was later changed to conform to this.
- Roanoke
- Sauk Village – named after the Sauk people
- Saunemin – named after a Kickapoo chief
- Scioto – The name Scioto is derived from the Wyandot word skɛnǫ·tǫ' meaning "deer"
  - Scioto Mills
  - Sciota Township
- Seneca
- Shabbona and Shabbona Grove – named after the Potawatomi chief and peacemaker Shabbona
- Shawneetown – named after the Shawnee people
  - Old Shawneetown
  - Shawnee National Forest
- Shokokon
- Skokie
- Somonauk
- Tamaroa – named after the Tamaroa, an Illiniwek people
- Tampico
- Tennessee – named after the state of Tennessee
- Tioga – The name "Tioga" means "at the forks". The various Iroquois tribes all had similar words for the concept: the Oneida called it Te-ah-o-ge, the Mohawk called it Te-yo-ge-ga, the Cayuga called it Da-o-ga and the Seneca called it Da-yo-o-geh.
- Tiskilwa
- Toluca
- Tonica – named after the Tunica people
- Topeka
- Towanda – named after Towanda, Pennsylvania; the name means "burial ground" in the Algonquian language.
- Tuscola
- Tuscarora
- Walla Walla – name means "many waters"
- Wapella
- Wataga
- Watseka – Incorporated in 1865, the name "Watseka" derives from the Potawatomi name "Watch-e-kee", "Daughter of the Evening Star", the wife of early eastern Illinois settler Gurdon Saltonstall Hubbard.
- Wauconda – Originally spelled "Wakanda"
- Waukegan – meaning "little fort"; cf. Potawatomi wakaigin "fort" or "fortress"
- Wauponsee – named for a Potawatomi Chief whose name means “Bright Place in the Sky”
- Wenona
- Wenonah
- Winnetka – name is believed to originate from the Potawatomi language, meaning "beautiful place"
- Wyoming – named after the Wyoming Valley in Pennsylvania which derives from the Lenape Munsee name xwé:wamənk, meaning "at the smaller river hills."

=== Lakes and rivers ===
- Illinois River
- Kaskaskia River - named for the Kaskaskia people
- Kishwaukee River and South Branch Kishwaukee River – derived from the Potowatomi word meaning the "river of the sycamore."
- Lake Michigan
- Mississippi River
- Pecatonica River – The word Pecatonica is an anglicization of two Algonquian language words; Bekaa (or Pekaa in some dialects), which means slow and niba, which means water; forming the conjunction Bekaaniba or Slow Water.
- Piscasaw Creek
- Pistakee Lake – "pistakee" comes from the Algonquin word for buffalo
- Sinsinawa River – One version holds that "Sinsinawa" derives from an Algonquian word (possibly Potawatomi, Fox or Menominee language) for "rattlesnake" to describe the Sioux. Another version says "home of the young eagle".
- Somonauk Creek
- Waukegan River – meaning "little fort"; cf. Potawatomi wakaigin "fort" or "fortress"

=== Protected areas ===
- Channahon State Park
- Chautauqua National Wildlife Refuge
- Emiquon National Wildlife Refuge
- Hackmatack National Wildlife Refuge – The name Hackmatack is an Algonquin term for the American tamarack or Larix laricina, a conifer formerly abundant in regional wetlands.
- Illinois Caverns State Natural Area
- Johnson-Sauk Trail State Recreation Area
- Kickapoo State Recreation Area
- Kishwaukee River State Fish and Wildlife Area
- Midewin National Tallgrass Prairie – The name Midewin (/mɪˈdeɪwɪn/, mi-DAY-win) is a Potawatomi word referring to the tribe's healers.
- Mississippi River State Fish and Wildlife Area
- Sangchris Lake State Recreation Area
- Shabbona Lake State Park
- Saganashkee Slough – It was formerly a huge swamp that extended from west of 104th Avenue to the limits of Blue Island, and its original name, Ausaganashkee, is a Potawatomi Indian word that means "slush of the earth," wrote former Forest Preserve District general superintendent Cap Sauer in a historical account written in the late 1940s.

=== Names from fiction ===
- Metamora – based on the character in the popular play Metamora; or, The Last of the Wampanoags
- Niota – based on the name of a fictional character in a dime novel, a Native American chief named "Nee-o-tah"
