= Pinery Creek =

Stream in the American state of Missouri

Pinery Creek is a stream in Washington County in the U.S. state of Missouri. It is a tributary of Little Indian Creek.

The stream headwaters are at 38°06′55″N 90°53′02″W and the confluence with Little Indian Creek is at 38°09′47″N 90°50′53″W. The confluence is about 1.5 miles west of Richwoods.

Pinery Creek was so named on account of pine timber along its course.

== See also ==
- List of rivers of Missouri
