= Creighton River =

Location
- Country: United States

Physical characteristics
- Source
  - location: Michigan
- Mouth
  - location: 46°14′03″N 86°14′34″W

The Creighton River is a 23.3-mile-long (37.5 km) tributary of the West Branch Manistique River on the Upper Peninsula of Michigan in the United States.

== See also ==
- List of rivers of Michigan
