= Little Indian Creek =

Stream in the American state of Missouri

Little Indian Creek is a northwest flowing stream in northwest Washington and southeast Franklin counties in Missouri. The stream is a tributary to Indian Creek.

The stream headwaters arise southeast of Richwoods at 38°07′34″N 90°48′27″W and the confluence with Indian Creek is at 38°14′44″N 90°56′44″W.

The stream source area lies west of Missouri Route 47 and it flows northwest passing under Missouri Route A one mile west of Richwoods. Pinery Creek joins the stream from the southwest just north of Route A. In southern Franklin County the stream is joined from the east by Rye Creek and the stream flows through the Little Indian Creek Conservation Area. The confluence with Indian Creek is about 1.7 miles south of that streams confluence with the Meramec River.

The name was chosen because it is smaller than and a tributary to Big Indian Creek.
