= Old Indian Trail (Michigan) =

Historic Native American trail in Michigan

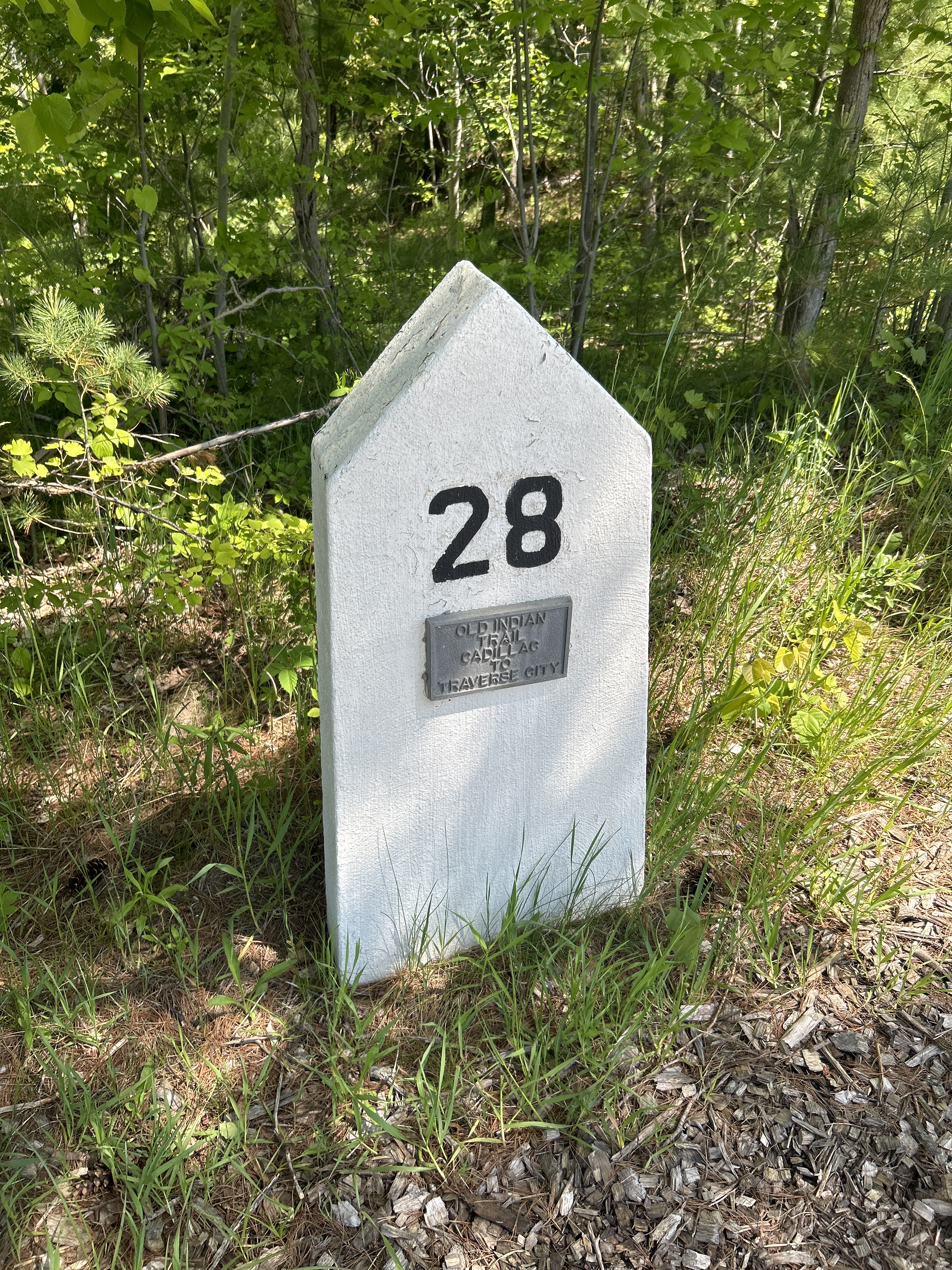
An Old Indian Trail marker near Traverse City

The Old Indian Trail is a historic trail in the northwestern Lower Peninsula of Michigan, running for roughly 55 miles (89 km) between Cadillac and Traverse City. In use since as early as 600 BCE by the Hopewell civilization, the Old Indian Trail began to be used regularly by the Anishinaabe in the 13th century, and was largely used until European settlement in the 1800s. Today, the trail no longer exists, but its location is marked by 33 white stone markers.

== Route ==
The Old Indian Trail began along the shore of Lake Mitchell near Cadillac, and ran northwesterly past the modern-day communities of Boon and Meauwataka before reaching the Manistee River. Here, a massive log jam allowed for travelers to cross the river, continuing north past present-day Buckley, Hannah, and Chums Corner. The trail then descended northerly into Traverse City, where it ended at the shore of the West Arm of Grand Traverse Bay, a bay of Lake Michigan.

== Trail markers ==
There are 33 markers along the Old Indian Trail. Each marker is a pentagonal white stone slab, painted with its corresponding number, and featuring a small plaque reading "OLD INDIAN TRAIL CADILLAC TO TRAVERSE CITY". A number of these markers are located along major roadways, while some are on private property.

In 1940, Cadillac residents Milo Petoskey Crosby and Jim Pontiac planted the first 14 markers, between Lake Mitchell and the Manistee River. In the 1960s, the next five markers were placed by local residents Ed Babcock and James Comp. In 1987, the final 14 markers, between Buckley and Traverse City, were placed by former chairman of the Little Traverse Bay Bands of Odawa Indians, Frank Ettawageshik.

List of Old Indian Trail markers (south to north)
Number	Marker name	Coordinates
1	Lake Mitchell Marker	44°15′49.8″N 85°28′19.4″W
2	Leaving the Lake Marker	44°16′09.3″N 85°29′04.4″W
3	Boon Marker	44°16′52.2″N 85°29′30.1″W
4	Sweet Spot Marker	44°17′43.5″N 85°29′41.9″W
5	First Plow Marker	44°18′13.2″N 85°29′57.4″W
6	Old Ash Marker	44°19′27.5″N 85°30′31.8″W
7	Circle Marker	44°19′36.3″N 85°30′49.3″W
8	Farm Marker	44°19′55.4″N 85°31′12.0″W
9	Meauwataka Marker	44°21′11.1″N 85°32′06.6″W
10	Gentle Grade Marker	44°21′17.7″N 85°32′24.8″W
11	Restful Marker	44°22′01.1″N 85°33′37.7″W
12	Stagecoach Marker	44°24′36.3″N 85°35′57.0″W
13	Freight Wagon Marker	44°25′28.8″N 85°35′55.7″W
14	Indian Crossing Marker South	44°27′02.9″N 85°38′03.8″W
15	Indian Crossing Marker North	44°27′10.6″N 85°37′51.6″W
16	Indian Camp Marker	44°27′40.0″N 85°38′25.0″W
17	Buckley South Marker	44°29′15.1″N 85°39′25.2″W
18	Buckley Center Marker	44°30′16.0″N 85°39′24.2″W
19	Buckley North Marker	44°30′44.4″N 85°39′22.6″W
20	Black Ash Marker	44°31′41.3″N 85°38′45.3″W
21	Mayfield Marker	44°33′20.2″N 85°38′07.4″W
22	Saint Mary Marker	44°35′06.0″N 85°38′07.3″W
23	Mill Road Marker	44°37′16.4″N 85°38′07.4″W
24	Deer Marker	44°38′34.3″N 85°38′07.6″W
25	Vance Road Marker	44°39′27.4″N 85°39′20.1″W
26	Chums Corner Marker	44°40′18.8″N 85°39′45.1″W
27	Rennie School Marker	44°41′11.5″N 85°39′20.8″W
28	Wemeck's Marker	44°43′02.1″N 85°38′41.1″W
29	South Airport Marker	44°43′21.4″N 85°38′24.5″W
30	Suburban Marker	44°43′50.3″N 85°38′08.6″W
31	Cass Street Marker	44°44′52.6″N 85°37′15.6″W
32	Boardman River Marker	44°45′36.7″N 85°37′16.6″W
33	West Bay Marker	44°46′10.3″N 85°38′05.5″W
