= Papoose Creek =

Stream in the American state of Missouri

Papoose Creek is a stream in Washington County in the U.S. state of Missouri. It is a tributary of Little Indian Creek.

The stream headwaters arise at 38°10′47″N 90°49′35″W adjacent to the west side of Missouri Route 47 and it flows to the southwest for approximately 1.5 miles to its confluence with Little Indian Creek just north of Missouri Route A and west of the community of Richwoods at 38°09′26″N 90°50′33″W.

Papoose Creek was so named due to its diminutive size, which was likened to a papoose.

== See also ==
- List of rivers of Missouri
