= Jacob Smith (fur trader) =

American fur trader (1773–1825)

Jacob Smith (Wahbesins "The Young Swan"; c. 1773 – 1825), was a fur trader in the Michigan Territory, the founder of Flint, Michigan, and an American spy best known for developing close relations with many Native American tribes in the Michigan Territory and brokering significant land treaties on behalf of the United States government.

Working as an intelligence gatherer and confidential agent for the United States in the War of 1812, Smith was captured at Fort Mackinac in an attempt to inform Lieutenant Porter Hanks of the impending war. Smith served as a captain in the War of 1812 and was present during the surrender of Detroit under General William Hull. Smith also served as an interpreter-liaison to Native Americans for the United States and helped negotiate the release of several Euro-American families taken prisoner by Native American tribes.

== Family and early life ==
Jacob Smith was born to a soap-maker of Canadian and German descent in Quebec, Canada, and learned to speak fluently in English, French, and the Ojibwe-Ottawa dialect of the Algonquin language. Smith married his first wife, Mary Reed, on July 25, 1798 in the Holy Trinity Anglican Church in Quebec. They went on to have five children while Smith began working in the family butchery. He later married a Native American woman, with whom he had one child, while engaging in the fur trade.

== Native American relations ==
Smith began his career as a fur trader among many Native American tribes along the Flint and Saginaw Rivers. Known for being honest in his dealings, assimilating to Native ways of life, and greatly admired for his skills in woodcraft, Smith became very close and well trusted among the Native Americans in Michigan Territory. Smith had a confidence placed in him that no other European man had in the region and was given the name of "Wahbesins," meaning "Young Swan," by the Ojibwe.

Smith helped the United States government secure land from many Native American tribes, playing a key role in the 1807 Treaty of Detroit and the 1819 Treaty of Saginaw, which ceded millions of acres of land to the United States that make up a majority of Michigan's Lower Peninsula.

=== Treaty of Detroit ===
The 1807 treaty, made in Detroit with the Odawa, Ojibwe, Wyandot and Potawatomi nations, ceded to the United States present-day Southeast Michigan and Northwest Ohio and was hailed as the first major land cession in the region.

=== Treaty of Saginaw ===
Reluctant to cede more land in the central portion of Michigan's Lower Peninsula during the 1819 talks, in what was deemed to be a hunter and fisherman's paradise, the Ojibwe secured an ample number of land reservations in the area from the United States government.

Smith played a very influential role in securing these treaties, even proposing the eventual compromise in the 1819 Treaty of Saginaw, which set aside eleven, 640-acre sections of land for the Ojibwe tribes located near the Grand Traverse of the Flint River. Each of the 114 Ojibwe chiefs that eventually signed onto the treaty had previously interreacted with Smith and knew him to be an honest and hospitable fur trader. He used these connections to help move the process forward on behalf of the United States government.

For his efforts in helping broker the Saginaw Treaty, Smith received five hundred dollars from the Territorial Governor of Michigan, Lewis Cass, and was hailed as a wise counsel during the talks.

=== Boyer Family release ===
In addition, Smith rendered admirable service in using his relationships with Native American tribes to help liberate prisoners captured by Indians – to which the Boyer family release in the summer of 1814 was the most notable. After the Boyer home was burned by Indians and the family taken captive, Smith went into the local village with a horse full of saddled goods to use as ransom. The Boyer family was released unharmed as the Indians were impressed by Smith's bravery in coming to the village.

=== Henderson Family release ===
Smith also helped aid in the release of the Henderson family from a Saginaw tribe in late July 1812. After David Henderson, his wife, and their children were taken prisoner, Smith talked to Saginaws, with whom he was friends, and convinced them to release the Henderson family.

== The War of 1812 ==
Smith served in the Michigan Militia during the War of 1812 under Captain Richard Smyth's Company of Twelve Months Volunteers Cavalry from June 30 to August 16, 1812 and was present during the surrender at the Siege of Detroit.

=== Saginaw Mission ===
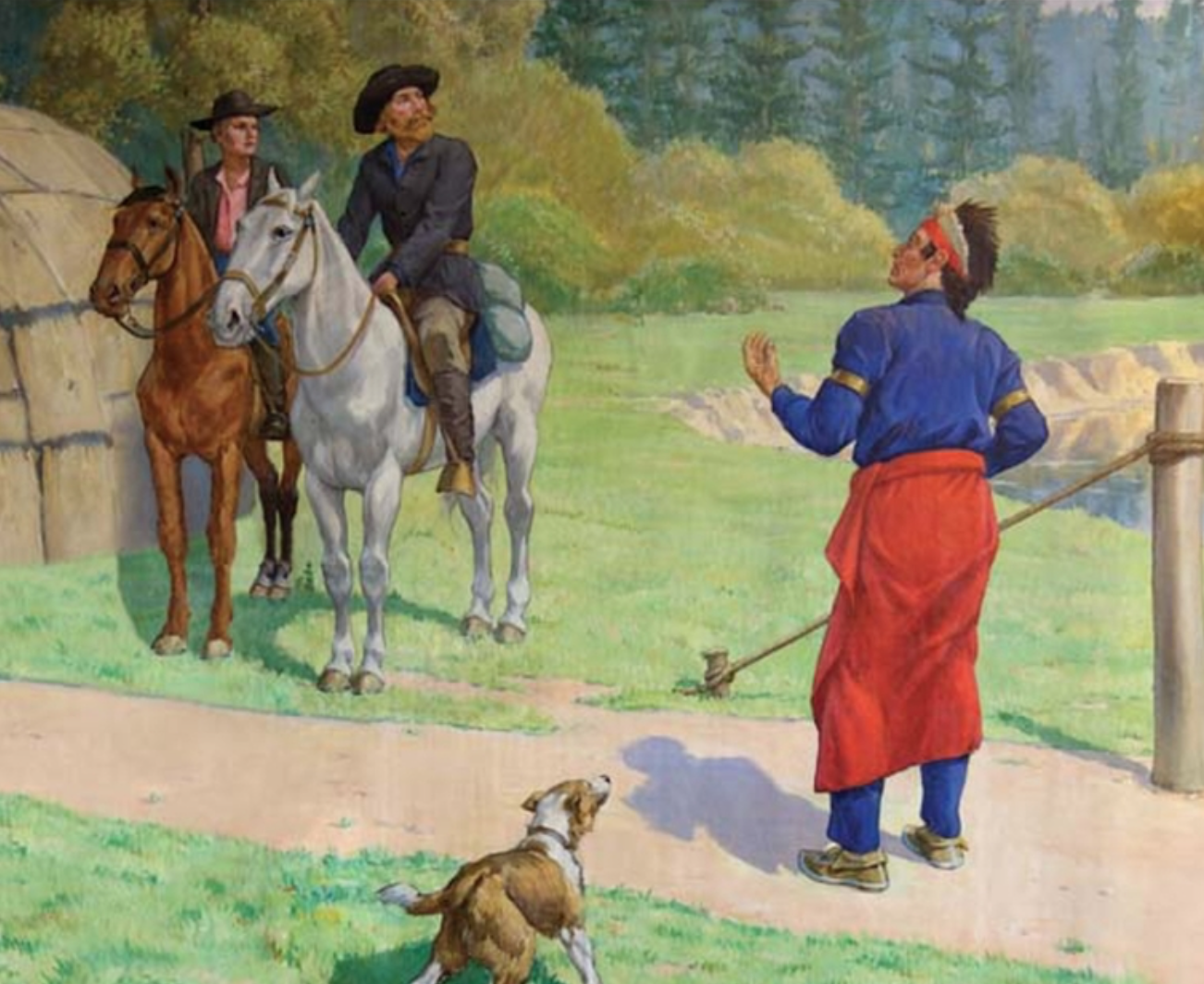
Jacob Smith Visiting Native American village in Saginaw

Using his close relations with many Native American tribes, Smith helped gather intelligence for the United States government during the war. In one instance, Smith rode into a Saginaw village with two assistants pretending to be on a trading expedition in an attempt decipher the tribe's position in the war and level of sympathy to the British cause. One of the assistants, while drunk in the village, unknowingly revealed to the tribe that they were spies – a mistake that cost him his life. Smith managed to escape the village but sustained a permanent eye injury when brush caught his face while fleeing in haste on horseback.

=== Fort Mackinac Mission ===
In July 1812, Smith embarked upon a journey to Fort Mackinac in an attempt to alert Porter Hanks about a potential British attack at Mackinac Island after learning about the American declaration of war against Great Britain. British commanders found out about the declaration of war many days before Americans in Detroit did, let alone the commanding officer on Mackinac Island. Smith clashed with the Detroit Postmaster, James Abbott, whom he accused of intentionally delaying the mission. Abbott denied Smith's mission was government business, which resulted in a national controversy after the fact.

Smith left Detroit traveling alongside three Native Americans, one of whom was a young Odawa carrying an important wampum with a message from his chief that advised the northern Michigan Indians not to join the British cause in the war. When Smith arrived in Saginaw along his journey he met with veteran fur trader Charles Girard to disclose that he was carrying letters for American authorities on Mackinac Island alerting them of the war declaration.

However, Smith was detained by pro-British Indians in Saginaw on the suspicion that he was working on behalf of the United States. Knowing of this possibility, Smith had prepared by hiding the American orders and wearing a British military breast plate underneath his clothing. When he revealed to the Indians the British breast plate, they presumed him to be a British agent and were assured he was not working with the Americans. This act of foresight by Smith allowed him to trick the Saginaw tribe into releasing him as he told them he was going north on a mission for the British Army.

While the Indians followed Smith and his compatriots to make sure he told the truth, Smith told Girard that if his true identity was compromised to ensure the return of the American orders to Postmaster Abbott in Detroit. The Indians eventually stopped following Smith and he ultimately reached Mackinac. However, unknown to Smith was that the fort had been taken by the British just days earlier. Flying an American flag on the canoe to the island, Smith was taken prisoner by British forces. Smith's imprisonment did not last long as he hired three Indians to smuggle himself and his crew out. Hiding in canoes down the Au Sable River, Girard and Smith eventually made it back to Detroit.

== Flint ==
Smith is credited as the first European settler in Flint, Michigan. He located his first trading post there in 1810 where the Saginaw Trail from the Detroit River and Grand Traverse of the Flint River separate and lead to Saginaw and Birch Run – a central point which made it very easy to trade with the Native Americans.

While Smith's trading post was founded in 1810, it was not his permanent residence as he continued to live in Detroit until 1819. After the death of his wife, Mary Reed, and the signing of the Treaty of Saginaw, Smith built a sizeable log trading store in Flint in 1819. This became his permanent residence until his death and was the first building erected by Europeans in present-day Genesee County.

== Death and legacy ==
Before the 1819 Treaty of Saginaw, Smith lived in Detroit at the current corner of Woodbridge Street and Woodward Avenue. His family continued to live there after his death in 1825 while Smith's son-in-law, Major John Garland, took possession of the trading post in Flint. Smith, the earliest European pioneer in Flint, also became the first settler to die in Genesee County after passing in poor condition in 1825 from heart problems.

=== Treaty controversies ===
In the 1819 Treaty of Saginaw, many Native American names were listed to receive the various reservations outlined in the compromise. Later, five of the eleven reservations came under intense national debate. Smith wrote into the treaty five Native American names that were willed reservation numbers seven, eight, nine, ten, and eleven. After his death, it was discovered that these reservations were actually willed to Jacob Smith's five white children under Native American names that were given to them by Indians who frequented their house in Detroit.

Lewis Cass later wrote about knowing of Smith's plan and added a clause in the treaty to curtail Smith's proposal by outlining that reservations could only be granted to true Indians. The children claimed the land, but the United States government refused to grant the land titles. After petitioning Congress and getting ten of the original 114 Ojibwe chiefs who signed the Treaty of Saginaw to testify that it was the original intention of the treaty that Smith's children would inherit the land, some of the land in the reservations was granted to the Smith family. Although Smith died penniless, his children eventually inherited great sums of property from his work.

=== Legacy ===
Years after both Smith and Ne-o-me, the principal of the four chiefs of the Pewanigos of the Flint River, with whom Smith was very close, had died, the Indians spoke of them as brothers. While Jacob Smith was an influential and controversial figure in his lifetime, his name garners very little attention in Michigan history today. Regardless, his settlement in Flint grew to become a major city that has played a critical role throughout Michigan's history.
