= Meauwataka, Michigan =

- Unincorporated community
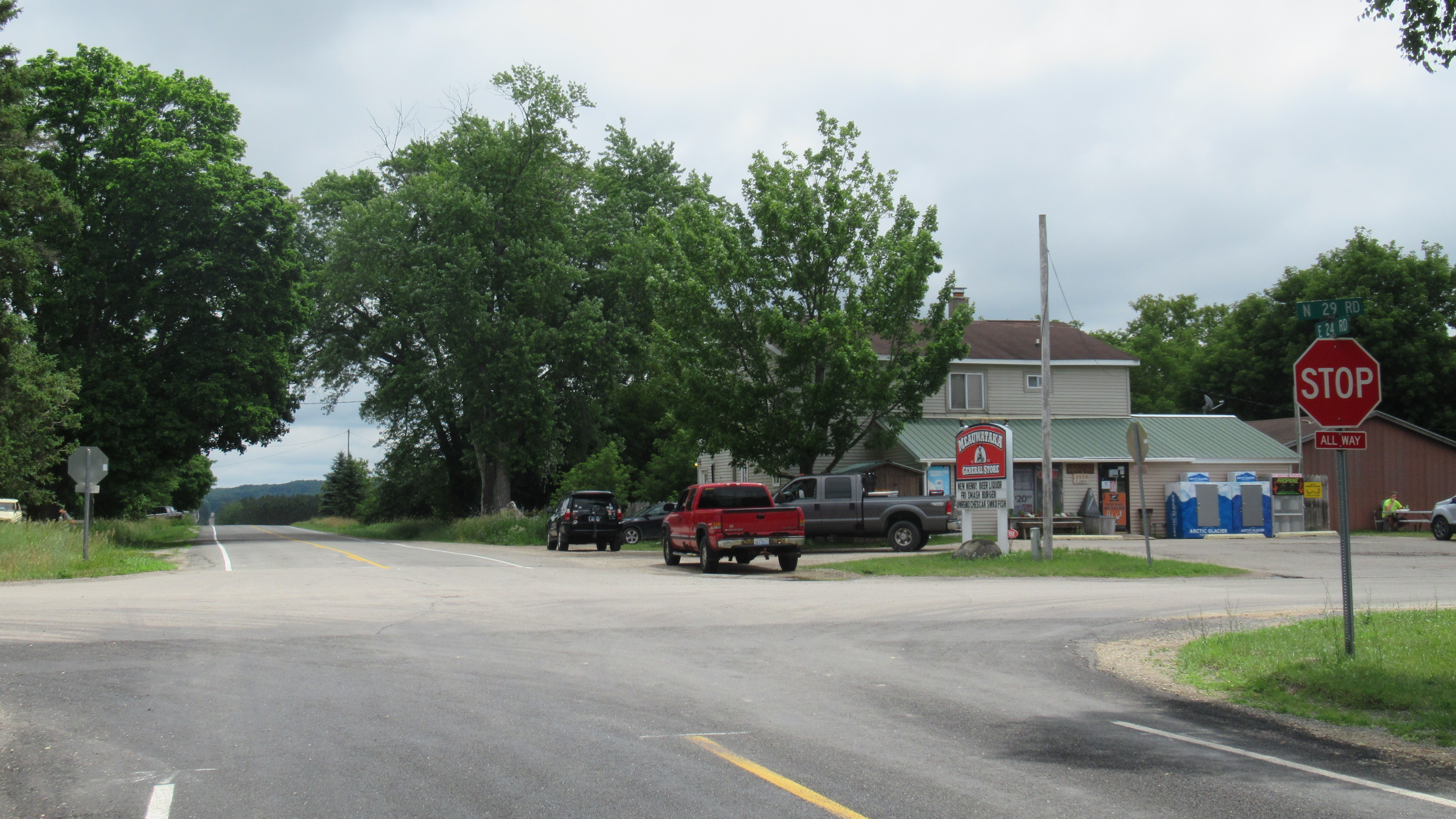
- Intersection of N. 29 Road and E. 24 Road in Meauwataka

- Location within Michigan Location within the United States
- Coordinates: 44°21′11″N 85°32′23″W
- Country: United States
- State: Michigan
- County: Wexford
- Township: Colfax
- Settled: 1867
- Elevation: 1,368 ft (417 m)
- Time zone: UTC-5 (Eastern (EST))
  - Summer (DST): UTC-4 (EDT)
- ZIP code(s): 49601 (Cadillac)
- Area code: 231
- GNIS feature ID: 632062

Meauwataka (/miːəwətɑːkə/ MEE-ə-wə-TAH-kə) is an unincorporated community in U.S. state of Michigan. Located in Colfax Township, Wexford County, Meauwataka is part of Northern Michigan, and is located within the Cadillac micropolitan area. As an unincorporated community, Meauwataka has no legally defined boundaries or population statistics of its own.

== History ==
Meauwataka takes its name from a Potawatomi word meaning "halfway", as the community is located roughly halfway between Lake Mitchell and the Manistee River along the Old Indian Trail. The community was settled in 1867, and was first known as Dayhuff Lake, after a nearby lake. A post office under the name 'Meauwataka' opened in 1872, lasting until 1952.

== See also ==
- List of Michigan placenames of Native American origin
