= South Branch Kishwaukee River =

River in Illinois, United States

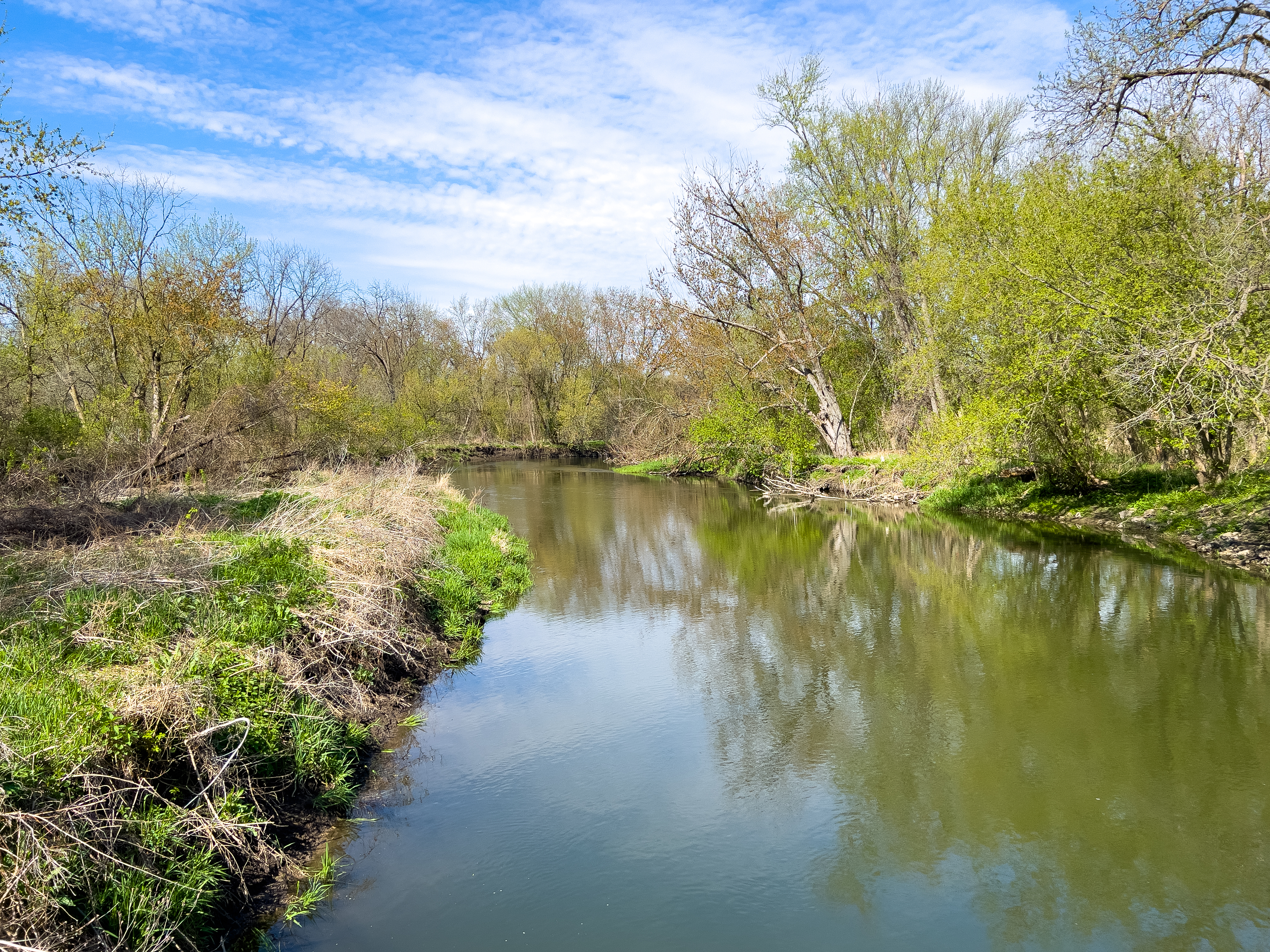
- The South Branch Kishwaukee River flowing through Kishwaukee River State Fish and Wildlife Area, spring 2025

Physical characteristics
- Source
  - location: Shabbona Township, DeKalb County, Illinois
  - coordinates: 41°46′24″N 88°54′06″W
  - elevation: 900 ft (270 m)
- Mouth
  - location: Confluence with the Kishwaukee River near Rockford, Illinois
  - coordinates: 42°12′00″N 88°59′01″W
  - elevation: 709 ft (216 m)
- Length: 64 mi (103 km)
- Discharge
  - location: Fairdale, Illinois, United States
  - average: 305 cu ft (8.6 m^{3})/s

Basin features
- Progression: South Branch Kishwaukee River → Kishwaukee → Rock → Mississippi → Gulf of Mexico
- GNIS ID: 422087

The South Branch Kishwaukee River is a 63.6-mile-long (102.4 km) tributary of the Kishwaukee River in northern Illinois. The South Branch is the main branch of the Kishwaukee River, joining it 10.6 miles (17.1 km) above its confluence with the Rock River. The South Branch flows through DeKalb County; in 2007 flooding along the tributary inundated areas of DeKalb County and Sycamore, Illinois.

Another stream, also named South Branch Kishwaukee River, flows through Kane County and McHenry County, joining the main stem of the Kishwaukee east of Marengo.

== Course ==
The South Branch Kishwaukee River, a major tributary of the Kishwaukee River, originates on the Cropsey Moraine, near Shabbona, Illinois. The stream flows in a northeast direction until it comes to Genoa, where it makes a westerly turn and begins flowing west-northwest.

Of all tributaries of the Kishwaukee, the South Branch is the largest in terms of the area drained.

The South Branch joins the main branch Kishwaukee River about 10.6 miles (17.1 km) above the river's mouth at the Rock River. The South Branch flows through DeKalb County, Illinois, draining 441 square miles (1,142 km^{2}) of land area.

== Description ==
Part of the South Branch's river bed is the plain of an ancient lake. The river wanders over moraines throughout its course. The substrate is rock strewn with sand and gravel; north of Sycamore the river has been mined for gravel. The average width of the South Branch is 55 feet (17 m). It has the lowest natural flow rate of any stream in the Kishwaukee River watershed. The stream, however, also receives the largest discharge of any of the streams in the watershed due to treated wastewater from the city of DeKalb.

A 1996 Illinois Environmental Protection Agency assessment of 62 miles (100 km) of the South Branch revealed that 30 miles (48 km) were "fair" condition and 32 miles (51 km) were characterized as "good". The assessment looked at overall resource quality and determined the factors responsible for lower quality conditions were "nutrients and organic enrichment (low dissolved oxygen) from agriculture and municipal point source pollution."

== Flooding ==
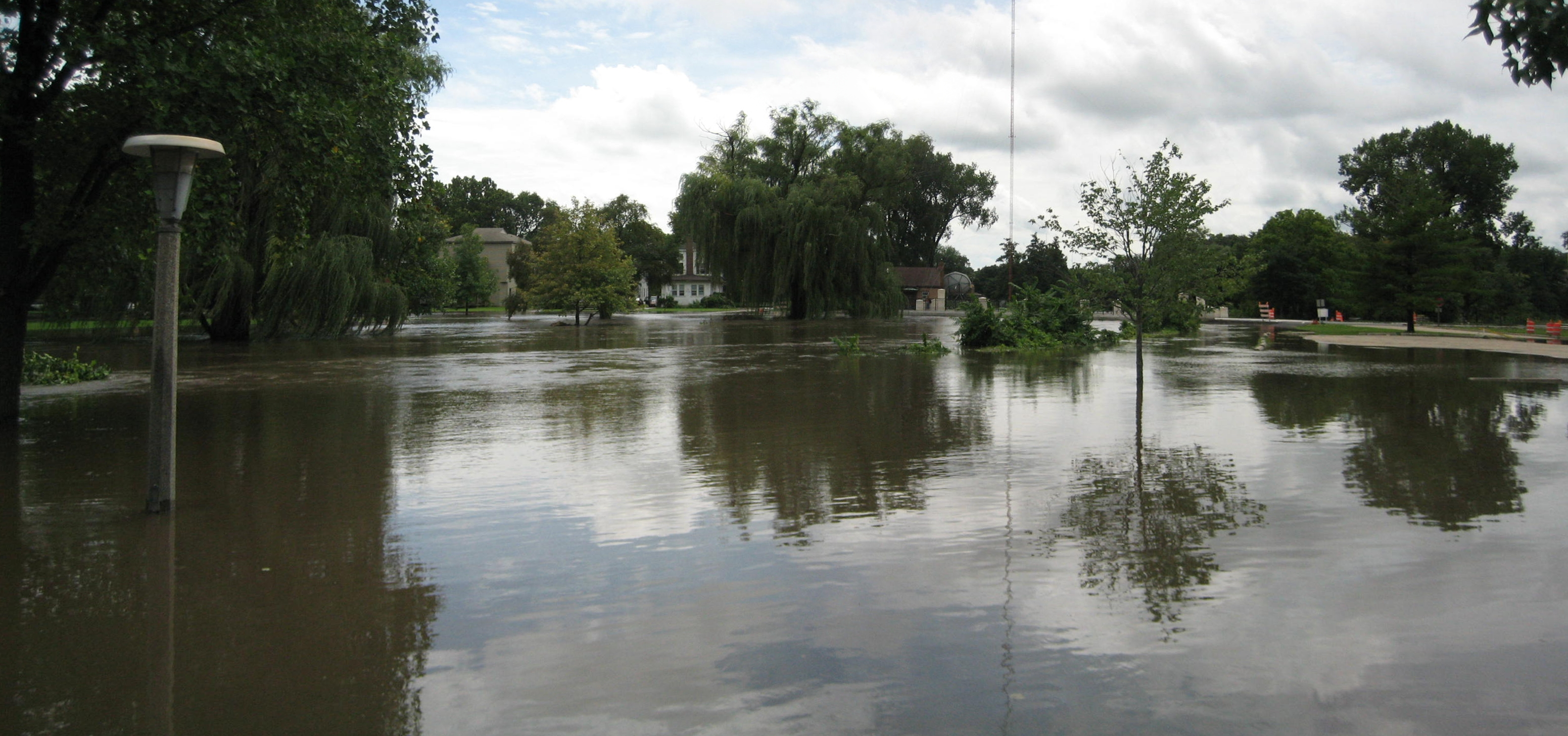
The South Branch Kishwaukee River near the Northern Illinois University Art Building, DeKalb, August 24, 2007

Where the South Branch flows through DeKalb County flood stage is 10.0 feet (3 m). Dating back to 1926 the South Branch has risen above flood stage nine times. The record flood occurred on July 2, 1983, when the river reached 15.8 feet (4.8 m). Flash flooding, which predominantly occurs in mid to late summer, can occur throughout the county in low-lying areas on the flood plain. Flooding resulting in a federal disaster declaration occurred in 1973, 1974, 1993, 1996 and 2007.

After 4.85 inches (123 mm) of rain fell on August 23 and 24, 2007, at DeKalb, the South Branch Kishwaukee River rose to its highest level since 1983 and its second highest level in recorded history. Numerous roads and bridges were closed, and the cities of DeKalb and Sycamore declared local emergencies. Federal disaster aid was made available when President George W. Bush declared DeKalb, Grundy, Kane, LaSalle, Lake, and Will counties, in northern Illinois, "major disaster" areas. The federal funding made individual assistance available to flood victims in Lake, Will and Grundy counties, and individual and public assistance available to those in DeKalb, Kane and LaSalle counties. In DeKalb and Sycamore, about 600 residents were displaced from their homes, and the DeKalb campus of Northern Illinois University was closed because of the flood.

== See also ==
- 2007 Midwest flooding
- Owens Creek (Kishwaukee River)
