= Tawas Lake =

Lake in the state of Michigan, United States

- Location within Michigan
- Location: Iosco County, Michigan
- Coordinates: 44°17′31″N 83°30′18″W
- Type: Lake
- Primary outflows: Tawas River
- Basin countries: United States
- Surface area: 1,600 acres (6 km^{2})
- Max. depth: 5 ft (2 m)
- Surface elevation: 577 ft (176 m)

Tawas Lake is a small lake in Iosco County, Michigan.

== See also ==
- List of lakes in Michigan
