= Kishwaukee River State Fish and Wildlife Area =

State park in Illinois, US

- IUCN category IV (habitat/species management area)
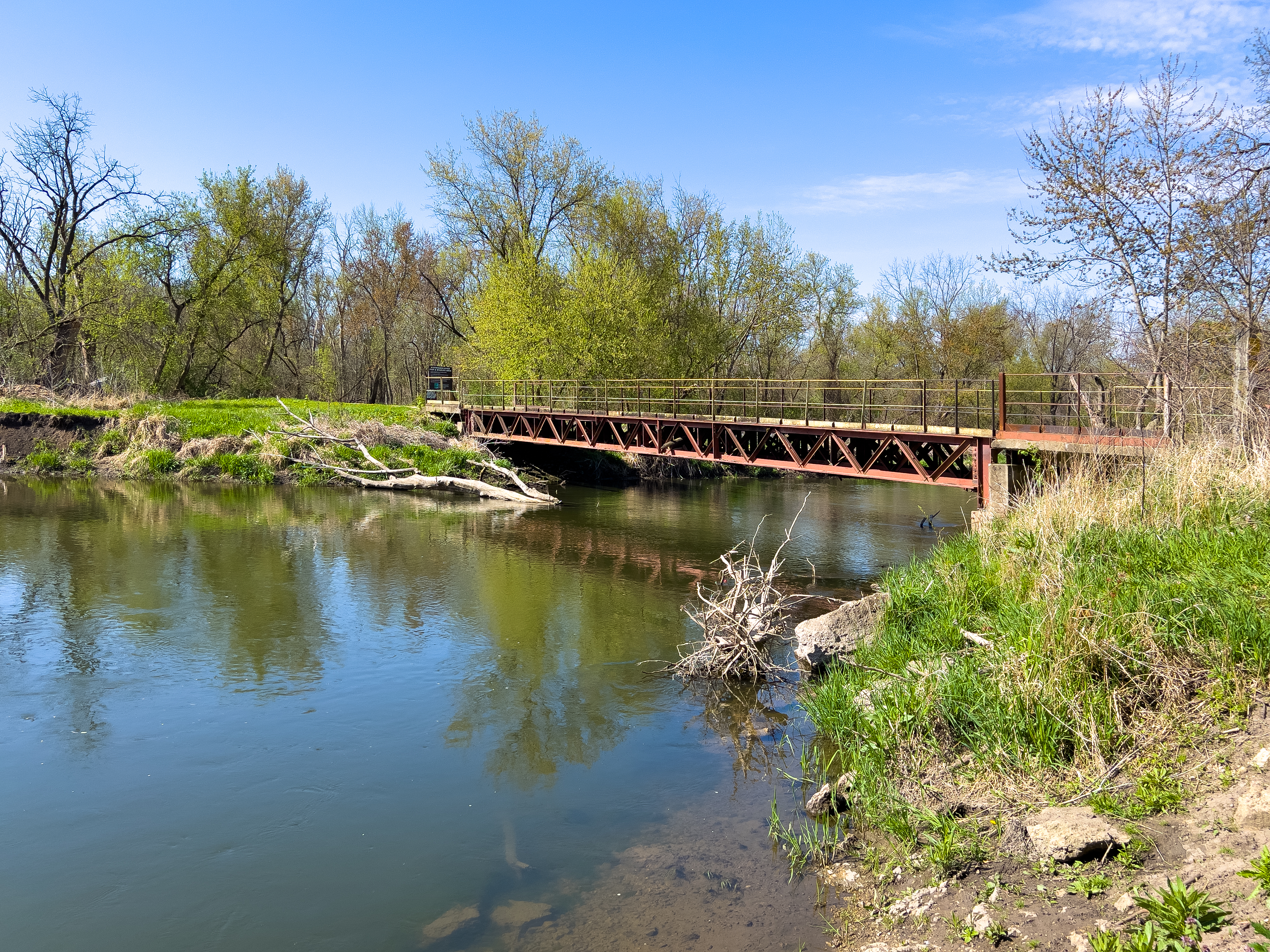
- Bridge over Kishwaukee River, Kishwaukee River State Fish and Wildlife Area, Dekalb County, Illinois.
- Interactive map of Kishwaukee River State Fish and Wildlife Area
- Location: DeKalb County, Illinois, USA
- Nearest city: Kirkland, Illinois
- Coordinates: 42°06′09″N 88°52′11″W
- Area: 570 acres (231 ha)
- Established: 2002
- Governing body: Illinois Department of Natural Resources

Kishwaukee River State Fish and Wildlife Area is an Illinois state park on 570 acres (231 ha) in DeKalb County, Illinois, United States.

== History ==
The land for the Kishwaukee River State Fish and Wildlife Area was acquired by the state of Illinois in 2002. That year, the state purchased 570 acres (231 ha) of land along the South Branch Kishwaukee River in DeKalb County. While the state acquired the 570-acre (231 ha) parcel south of the riverbank, DeKalb County was working on acquiring approximately 300 acres (121 ha) north of the river. The state purchase was facilitated by US$2.68 million from the Illinois Open Land Trust.

== Description ==
Kishwaukee River State Fish and Wildlife Area is located along the south bank of the South Branch Kishwaukee River just west of Kirkland, in DeKalb County, Illinois. The state property is located adjacent to the DeKalb County Forest Preserve's MacQueen Forest Preserve. The county eventually completed the purchase of the land on the north bank, across from the Fish and Wildlife Area, and designated it the Potawatomi Woods Forest Preserve. Between state and local land acquisitions more than 900 acres (364 ha) abutting 3.2 miles (5.1 km) of the river are publicly owned.

== See also ==
- Kishwaukee River
- North Branch Kishwaukee River
