= Rye Creek =

Stream in the American state of Missouri

Coordinates: 38.302829°N 90.905970°W

Rye Creek is a stream in Franklin County in the U.S. state of Missouri. It is a tributary of the Meramec River.

Rye Creek was named for the fact wild rye lined its course.

== See also ==
- List of rivers of Missouri
