= USS Iuka =

USS Iuka may refer to the following ships operated by the United States:

- USS Iuka (1864), a steamer acquired by the Union Navy during the American Civil War. She served from 1864 to 1865.
- USS Iuka (ATA-123), a Sotoyomo-class tug serving from 1942 to 1947
- USS Iuka (AT-37), a Bagaduce-class fleet tug serving from 1920 to 1946
- Iuka (YTB-819), a Natick-class large district harbor tug
