= Pusheta Creek =

Coordinates: 40°34′8″N 84°13′44″W

Pusheta Creek is a stream located entirely within Auglaize County, Ohio. The 13.7-mile (22.0 km) long stream is a tributary of the Auglaize River.

Pusheta Creek was named after an Indian chief who settled there.

== See also ==
- List of rivers of Ohio
