= Yuba, Wisconsin =

- Village
- Location of Yuba in Richland County, Wisconsin.
- Coordinates: 43°32′20″N 90°25′38″W
- Country: United States
- State: Wisconsin
- County: Richland

Area
  - Total: 0.31 sq mi (0.79 km^{2})
  - Land: 0.31 sq mi (0.79 km^{2})
  - Water: 0 sq mi (0.00 km^{2})
- Elevation: 863 ft (263 m)

Population (2020)
  - Total: 53
  - Density: 170/sq mi (67/km^{2})
- Time zone: UTC-6 (Central (CST))
  - Summer (DST): UTC-5 (CDT)
- Area code: 608
- FIPS code: 55-89625
- GNIS feature ID: 1577119

Yuba is a village in Richland County, Wisconsin, United States. The population was 53 at the 2020 census. Yuba is 11 miles southwest of Hillsboro and 17 miles north of Richland Center. County Hwy C runs through the village.

Because of its obscurity because it's the smallest incorporated municipality in Wisconsin, "'Where the hell is [Yuba]?!'[...]has become somewhat of an unofficial village slogan."

== Geography ==
According to the United States Census Bureau, the village has a total area of 0.30 square miles (0.78 km^{2}), all land.

== Demographics ==
Historical population
Census	Pop.	Note	%±
1940	116		—
1950	119		2.6%
1960	91		−23.5%
1970	79		−13.2%
1980	72		−8.9%
1990	77		6.9%
2000	92		19.5%
2010	74		−19.6%
2020	53		−28.4%
U.S. Decennial Census

=== 2010 census ===
As of the census of 2010, there were 74 people, 33 households, and 22 families living in the village. The population density was 246.7 inhabitants per square mile (95.3/km^{2}). There were 41 housing units at an average density of 136.7 per square mile (52.8/km^{2}). The racial makeup of the village was 100.0% White.

There were 33 households, of which 24.2% had children under the age of 18 living with them, 48.5% were married couples living together, 12.1% had a female householder with no husband present, 6.1% had a male householder with no wife present, and 33.3% were non-families. 30.3% of all households were made up of individuals, and 6.1% had someone living alone who was 65 years of age or older. The average household size was 2.24 and the average family size was 2.73.

The median age in the village was 40.5 years. 21.6% of residents were under the age of 18; 9.5% were between the ages of 18 and 24; 23% were from 25 to 44; 28.4% were from 45 to 64; and 17.6% were 65 years of age or older. The gender makeup of the village was 51.4% male and 48.6% female.

=== 2000 census ===
As of the census of 2000, there were 92 people, 32 households, and 24 families living in the village. The population density was 305.9 people per square mile (118.4/km^{2}). There were 34 housing units at an average density of 113.1 per square mile (43.8/km^{2}). The racial makeup of the village was 100.00% White.

There were 32 households, out of which 34.4% had children under the age of 18 living with them, 68.8% were married couples living together, 3.1% had a female householder with no husband present, and 25.0% were non-families. 18.8% of all households were made up of individuals, and 9.4% had someone living alone who was 65 years of age or older. The average household size was 2.88 and the average family size was 3.29.

In the village, the population was spread out, with 30.4% under the age of 18, 7.6% from 18 to 24, 22.8% from 25 to 44, 21.7% from 45 to 64, and 17.4% who were 65 years of age or older. The median age was 37 years. For every 100 females, there were 91.7 males. For every 100 females age 18 and over, there were 93.9 males.

The median income for a household in the village was $34,063, and the median income for a family was $34,750. Males had a median income of $40,000 versus $20,313 for females. The per capita income for the village was $11,819. There were 7.4% of families and 9.0% of the population living below the poverty line, including no under eighteens and none of those over 64.

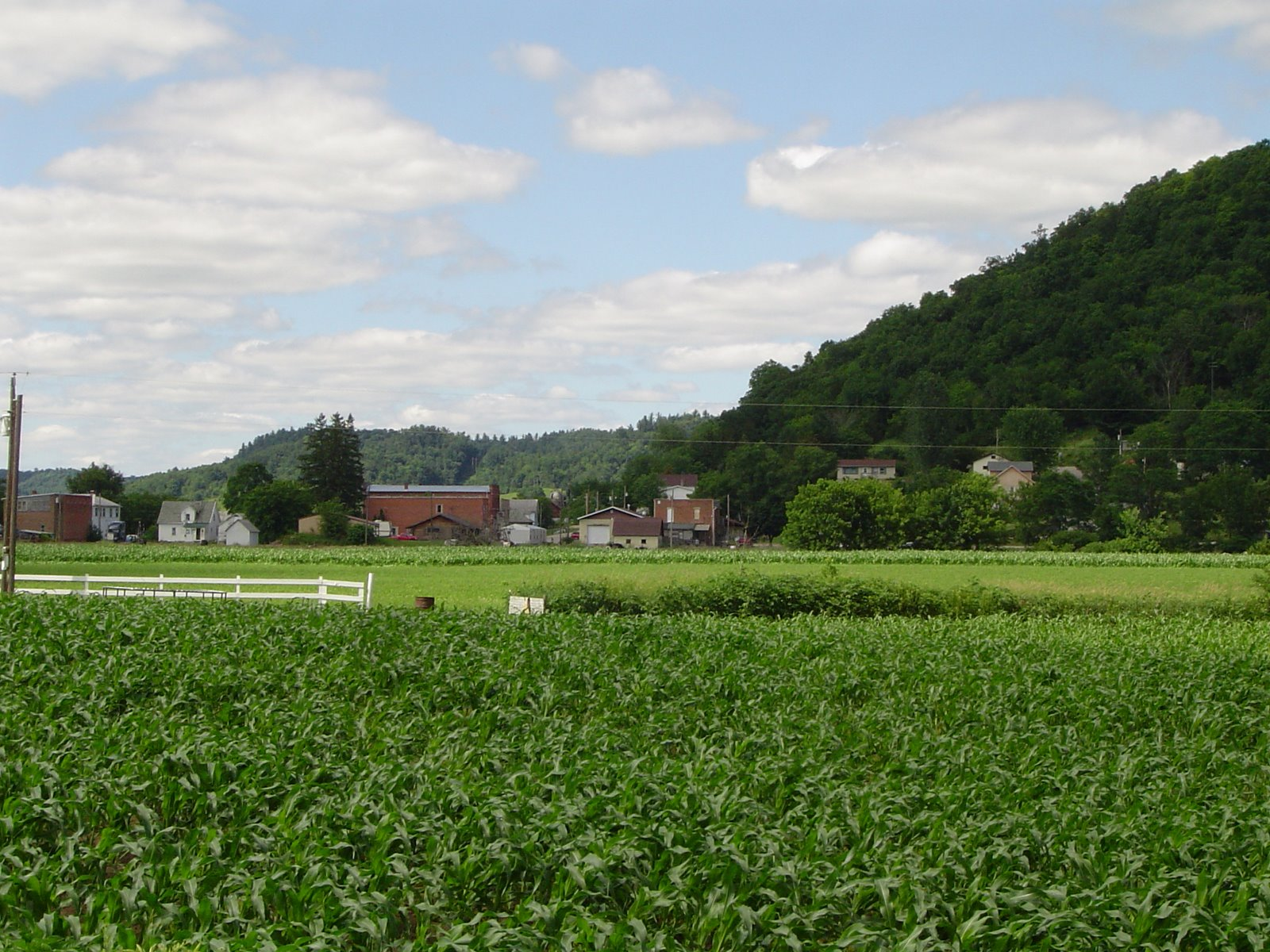
South of Yuba, looking north

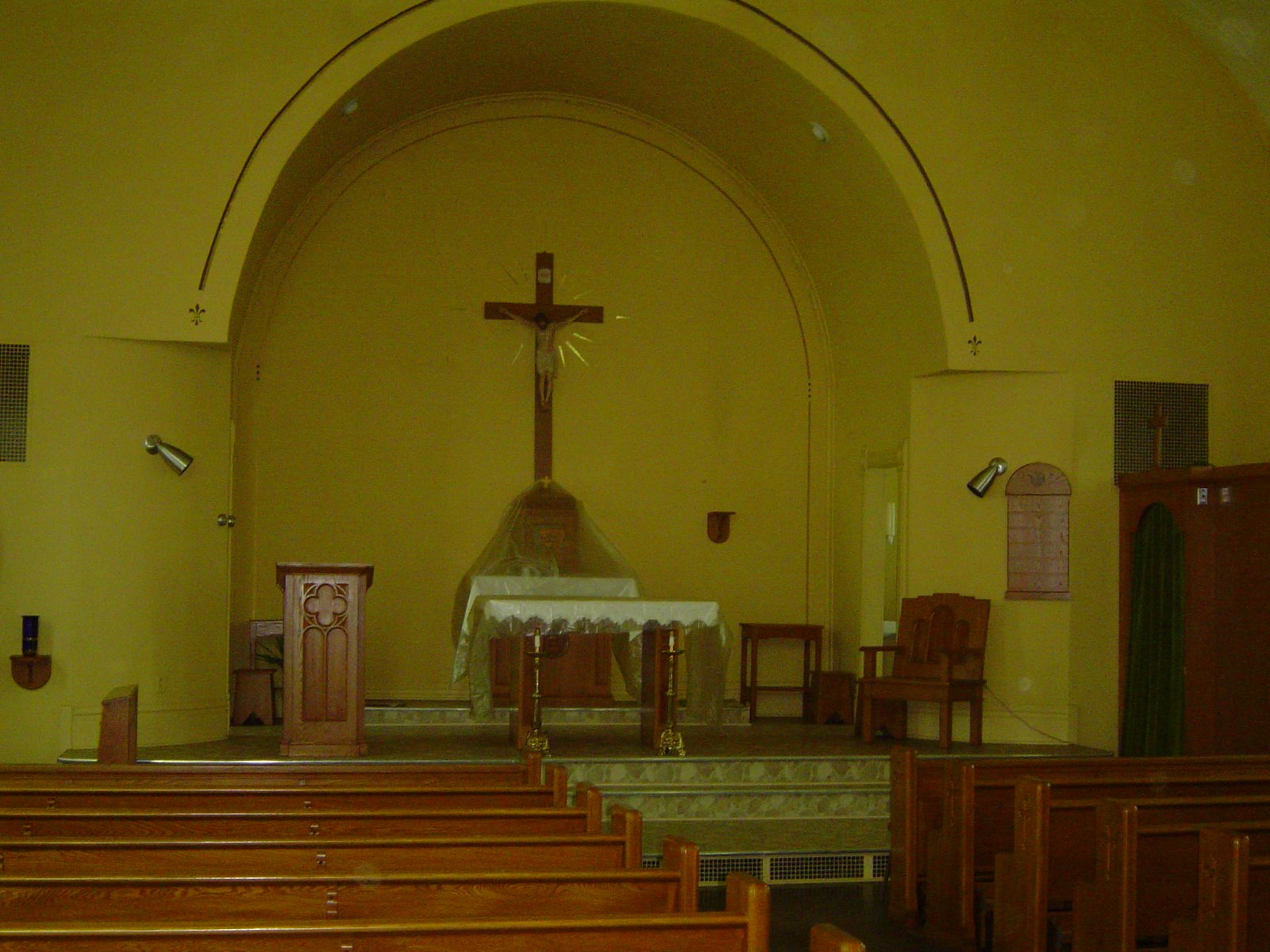
Inside St. Wenceslaus Church

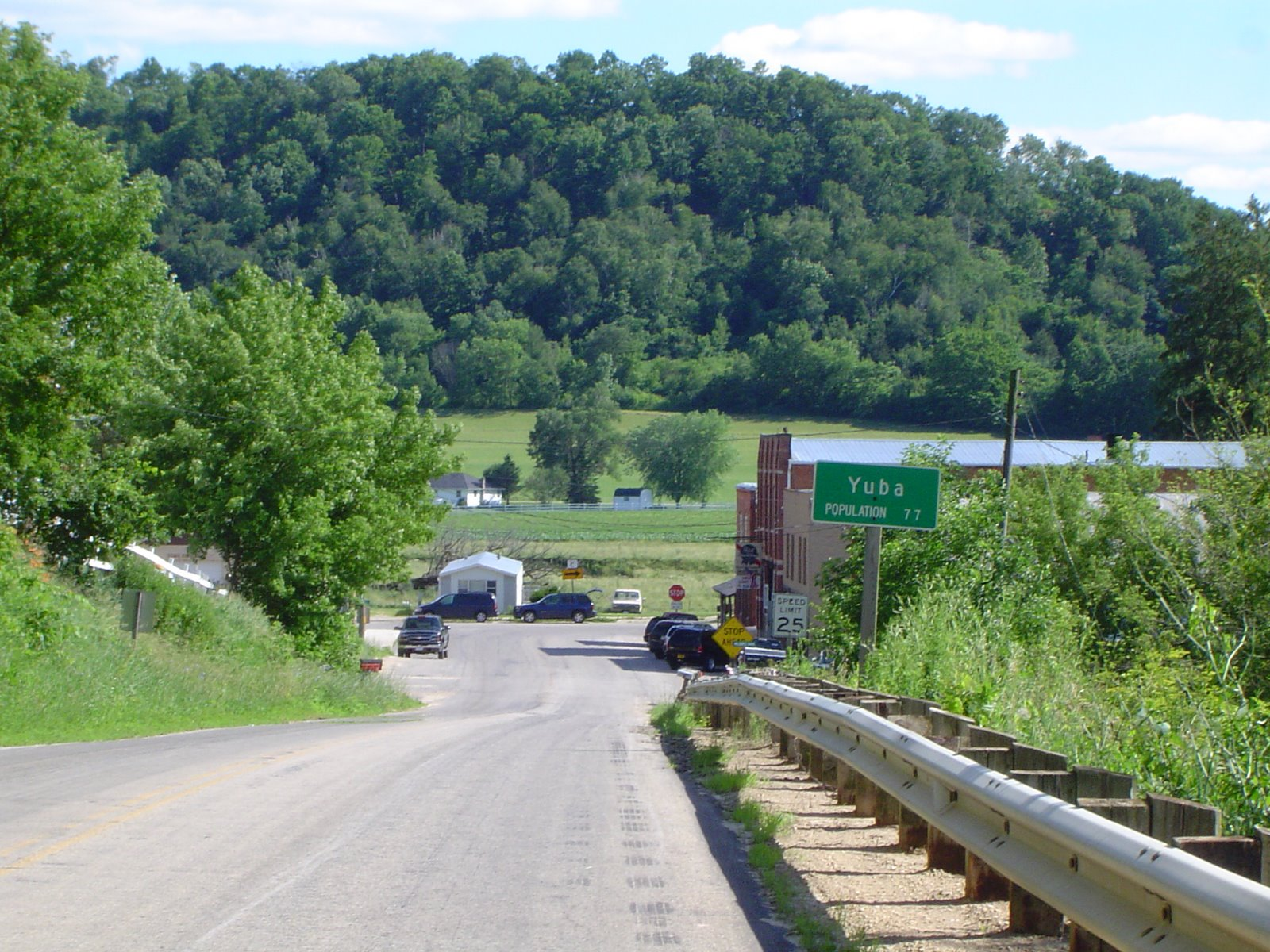
North of Yuba (population 77), looking south

Frank and Sophie's Farm, just north of Yuba
