= Wosso =

Obijwa leader of the Shiawassee band

Wosso or Wasso, aka Owosso, was a 19th-century Ojibwa leader of the Shiawassee band.

Wosso was a signatory of the Treaty of Saginaw in 1819 which ceded 24,000 square kilometers (or more than six million acres) in central Michigan to the US government. He was also a signatory of the Treaty of Detroit in 1807 which ceded much of southeastern Michigan and northwest Ohio to the US government.

The city of Owosso, Michigan, is named for him.
