= Treaty of Saginaw =

1819 treaty between the United States and Native Americans

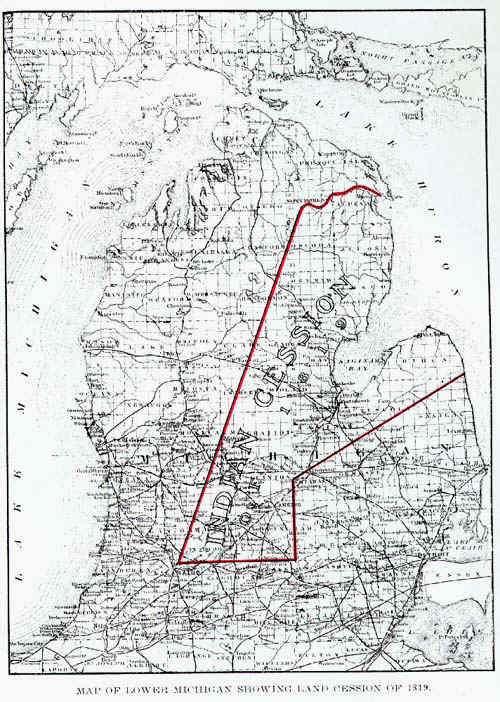
The territorial effects of the Treaty of Saginaw.

The Treaty of Saginaw, also known as the Treaty with the Chippewa, was made between Gen. Lewis Cass and Chief Mash Kee Yosh, Chief John Okemos, Chief Wasso and other Native American tribes of the Great Lakes region (principally the Ojibwe, but also the Ottawa and Potawatomi) in what is now the United States, on September 24, 1819, proclaimed by the President of the United States on March 25, 1820, and placed in law as 7 Stat. 203.

Native Americans ceded a large tract of land (more than six million acres (24,000 km^{2}) in the central portion of the Lower Peninsula of Michigan. The southern boundary of the tract extended from a few miles northeast of Jackson west to just northeast of Kalamazoo. The line then ran directly to the head of the Thunder Bay River in south-central Montmorency County and then along the river to the mouth in Thunder Bay, near Alpena. From there it extended northeast to the international boundary line between the United States and the British Province of Upper Canada and then along the boundary south to the boundary line established by the Treaty of Detroit in 1807, which ran from the shore of Lake Huron in northeast Sanilac County southwest to a point several miles northeast of Lansing and then due south the point of origin. The treaty reserved several smaller tracts of land for Indian use within the ceded territory.

== Background ==
The United States had recently signed the Treaty of Greenville and was looking to further expand. Lewis Cass, territorial governor of Michigan, had sought to bring Euro- American civilization to the territory. While the Detroit area had been previously ceded with the Treaty of Detroit, he had interest in the Saginaw region. He described it as "of first quality" and claimed it would "undoubtedly settle with great rapidity".

The Michigan territory was at the time sparsely settled. The Anishinaabeg people living in the area were allied with British Canada, being major participants in the North American fur trade. The United States saw this alliance as a threat to national security, and sought to end the fur trade and thus Britain's influence in the area.

== Negotiations ==
The Saginaw Ojibweg were unwilling to cede their land at first, after the substantial losses from the Treaty of Greenville. Undeterred, Cass and Louis Campau sent two large boats to Saginaw with soldiers and supplies and built a council house for the meeting. Also arriving at Saginaw were some traders, subagents, and interpreters who journeyed across the territory via horse and canoe. They were joined by around 4,000 Anishinaabeg, consisting of Ojibwe, Odawa and Potawatomi peoples.

Cass himself arrived at Saginaw on September 10, 1819, and called for a meeting the next morning at the newly constructed council house. At their first meeting, the governor made statements regarding the necessity of agriculture as civilization encroached and game became scarce. He concluded by stating they would be better off "confining themselves to reservations" and ceding the territory to the American government.

The Anishinaabeg responded with shock and anger. Ogamawkeketo, a representative of the Anishinaabeg, delivered a rousing rebuttal, decrying the Americans for being greedy and invasive compared to the British.

Your young men have invited us to come and light the Council fire. We are here to smoke the pipe of peace, but not to sell our lands. Our American Father wants them. Our English Father treats us better. He has never asked for them. Your people trespass upon our hunting grounds. You flock to our shores. Our waters grow warm. Our land melts like a cake of ice. Our possessions grow smaller and smaller. The warm wave of the white man rolls in upon us and melts us away. Our woman reproach us. Our children want homes. Shall we sell from under them the spot where they spread their blankets? We have not called you here. We smoke with you the pipe of peace.

— Ogamawkekto

This angered Cass, who informed the council that the United States had reigned victorious in the War of 1812 and thus could easily take over Saginaw without payment. The meeting concluded with a general sense of disappointment and anxiety.

Over the following days, the Americans began to hand out an immense quantity of brandy and whiskey. The intoxicated leadership of the Anishinaabeg fought bitterly against the settlers where they could, with some of the fiercest opposition too drunk to participate in the debates. Eventually Neome, an influential Saginaw Ojibwe leader from the Flint basin, started talks with trader Jacob Smith. After some discussion, Neome agreed to cede some land in exchange for a reservation for his children, believing that resistance would implore the Americans to forcibly annex the land with no compensation. After this, more Anishinaabeg started to enter agreements to reserve their own reservation land, culminating in a scramble to secure land grants.

The land cession was to be carried out in exchange for private reserves for Anishinaabeg people and land grants set aside for mixed-race children of traders and subagents. As a condition, the Saginaw Ojibwe demanded their annuity be paid in full, unlike the delayed payments of the Treaty of Detroit. Fistfights broke out after negotiations over annuity payments floundered. The Americans handled out fifteen barrels of whiskey to quell the situation, leading to the eventual albeit tense resolution of the debate and the signing of the Treaty of Saginaw, ceding most of the land in question to the United States.

The signing of the treaty caused the influence of the Native nations in the old northwest to substantially weaken as the fur trade collapsed, their historic lands were settled, and they became forcibly dependent on annuity payments from the United States.

== See also ==
- List of treaties
