= Iuka Springs, Missouri =

Extinct town in the American state of Missouri

Coordinates: 38°05′51″N 93°55′17″W

Iuka Springs is an extinct town in St. Clair County, in the U.S. state of Missouri. The GNIS classifies it as a populated place.

The community is located on Reid Creek along Missouri Route M approximately 12 miles west-northwest of Osceola and 19 miles south-southwest of Clinton.

Iuka Springs was platted in 1879. A post office called Iuka Springs was established in 1887, and remained in operation until 1903. According to tradition, "Iuka" was the name of a local Indian. Variant names were "Blakelys Mill" and "Boots Mill".
