= Harbor Island National Wildlife Refuge =

Protected area in Michigan, United States

- IUCN category IV (habitat/species management area)
- Location within Michigan Location within the United States
- Location: Harbor Island; Potagannissing Bay, Drummond Township, Chippewa County, Michigan
- Coordinates: 46°03′16″N 83°45′22″W
- Area: 695 acres (281 ha)
- Established: 1983
- Governing body: U.S. Fish and Wildlife Service
- Website: Harbor Island National Wildlife Refuge

The Harbor Island National Wildlife Refuge is a 695-acre (281 ha) horseshoe-shaped island and National Wildlife Refuge in Potagannissing Bay north of Drummond Island in the U.S. state of Michigan. The island was acquired in 1983 by the United States Fish and Wildlife Service from its previous owner, The Nature Conservancy, and set aside as a refuge. It is located in Drummond Township, in Chippewa County.

== Ecology and use ==
Potagannissing Bay is rich in freshwater fish, including lake trout and whitefish. The island itself contains balsam, paper birch, cedar, sugar maple, and red oak.

There are no bridges to Harbor Island, and visitors arrive by boat. The protected harbor is a well-known anchorage for small craft. The island and refuge are staffed from the Seney National Wildlife Refuge, also in northern Michigan.
