= Tawas River =

Location
- Country: United States

Physical characteristics
- Source
  - location: Michigan
- Mouth
  - location: 44°15′31″N 83°31′34″W

The Tawas River is a 3.0-mile-long (4.8 km) river in Michigan, United States, flowing from Tawas Lake through Tawas City and East Tawas into Lake Huron. There is a beach perch fishery at its mouth.

== See also ==
- List of rivers of Michigan
