= West Branch Manistique River =

Coordinates: 46°01′57″N 86°08′52″W

West Branch Manistique River is a river in the Upper Peninsula of the U.S. state of Michigan. It rises in Alger County, flows southeast into Schoolcraft County, and discharges into the Manistique River. Its principal tributary is the Creighton River. Much of the river's course flows through wetlands that are a part of the Lake Superior State Forest, a semi-protected land area. Despite the name of the state forest, the waters of the West Branch ultimately flow into Lake Michigan.

== Description ==
The West Branch Manistique River flows through a large field of clay wetlands, known as the Great Manistique Swamp, for almost its entire length. Its source is a network of perched wetlands near Melstrand in eastern Alger County. The river's watershed is little served by paved roads, as the region is of minimal economic value and has almost nobody living in it. After flowing underneath the Seney Stretch of Michigan highway M-28, the river continues southeast, curling and winding throughout its flow and changing its course constantly with the random deposition and erosion of bands of silt. After passing through and draining the southwest corner of the Seney National Wildlife Refuge, the boggy river turns south and eventually discharges its flow through Klegstads Slough into the main stem of the Manistique River. The mouth of the swampy river is about 10 miles (16 km) northeast of Manistique.
