= Little Siskiwit River =

Location
- Country: United States

Physical characteristics
- Source
  - location: Michigan
- Mouth
  - location: 47°55′53″N 88°57′14″W

The Little Siskiwit River is a 9.0-mile-long (14.5 km) river on Isle Royale in Lake Superior, in the U.S. state of Michigan.

== See also ==
- List of rivers of Michigan
