= Potagannissing Bay =

Bay in Michigan

- Bootaagan-mnising-wiikwed (Ottawa)
- Location within Michigan
- Location: Chippewa County, Michigan Algoma District, Ontario, Canada
- Coordinates: 46°02′30″N 83°52′00″W
- Type: Bay
- Surface elevation: 581 feet (177 m)

Potagannissing Bay (/pəˌtæɡəˈniːsɪŋ/ pə-TAG-ə-NEESS-ing; Anishinaabe: Bootaagan-minising-wiikwed (syncope as Bootaagan-mnising-wiikwed), meaning "Bay by the Mill Island (Drummond Island)") is a shallow, island-strewn bay on Lake Huron in Algoma District, Ontario, Canada and Chippewa County, Michigan, United States. It is bounded by the land masses of St. Joseph Island, Ontario at the northwest and Drummond Island, Michigan at the southeast, and by the water bodies the Saint Marys River and the De Tour Passage at the southwest and the North Channel at the northeast. The bay is northeast of De Tour Village, Chippewa County. The bay's waters are rich in freshwater fish.

== Geography ==
Potagannissing Bay occupies the site of the rapid melting of a glacier at the end of the Wisconsin glaciation approximately 10,000 years before the present. The melting ice dumped random piles of rock and gravel onto a section of land surface so low-lying that most of it wound up under the surface of the Great Lakes. The bay is currently studded with 53 named islands and innumerable unnamed ones. Few of the islands are permanently inhabited, but many are privately owned with summer cottages built upon them for the use of their owners.

The bay's largest island is Harbor Island, a National Wildlife Refuge since 1983.

== Economy ==
The bay's largest industries are sport and charter fishing for trophy fish such as bass, northern pike, and salmon; commercial fishing for fish such as lake trout and walleye; and pleasure boating. The innumerable islands of the bay create opportunities for amateur exploring and sightseeing, and a sheltered coastline is rarely far away.

== Natural history ==
The piscatorial opportunities of the bay have drawn a significant population of fish-eating birdlife, including the great blue heron, osprey, and bald eagle.
