= Hackmatack National Wildlife Refuge =

Protected area in Illinois and Wisconsin, United States

- IUCN category IV (habitat/species management area)
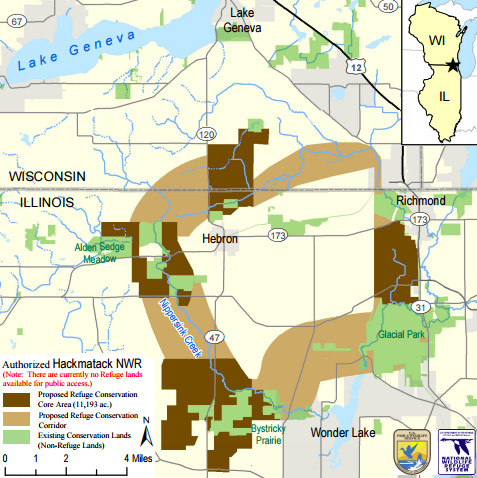
- Boundaries of the Hackmatack National Wildlife Refuge

- Location within the United States
- Location: McHenry County, Illinois, and Walworth County, Wisconsin, United States
- Coordinates: 42°22′55″N 88°27′47″W
- Area: 11,200 acres (45 km^{2})
- Established: 2012
- Governing body: U.S. Fish and Wildlife Service
- Website: Hackmatack National Wildlife Refuge

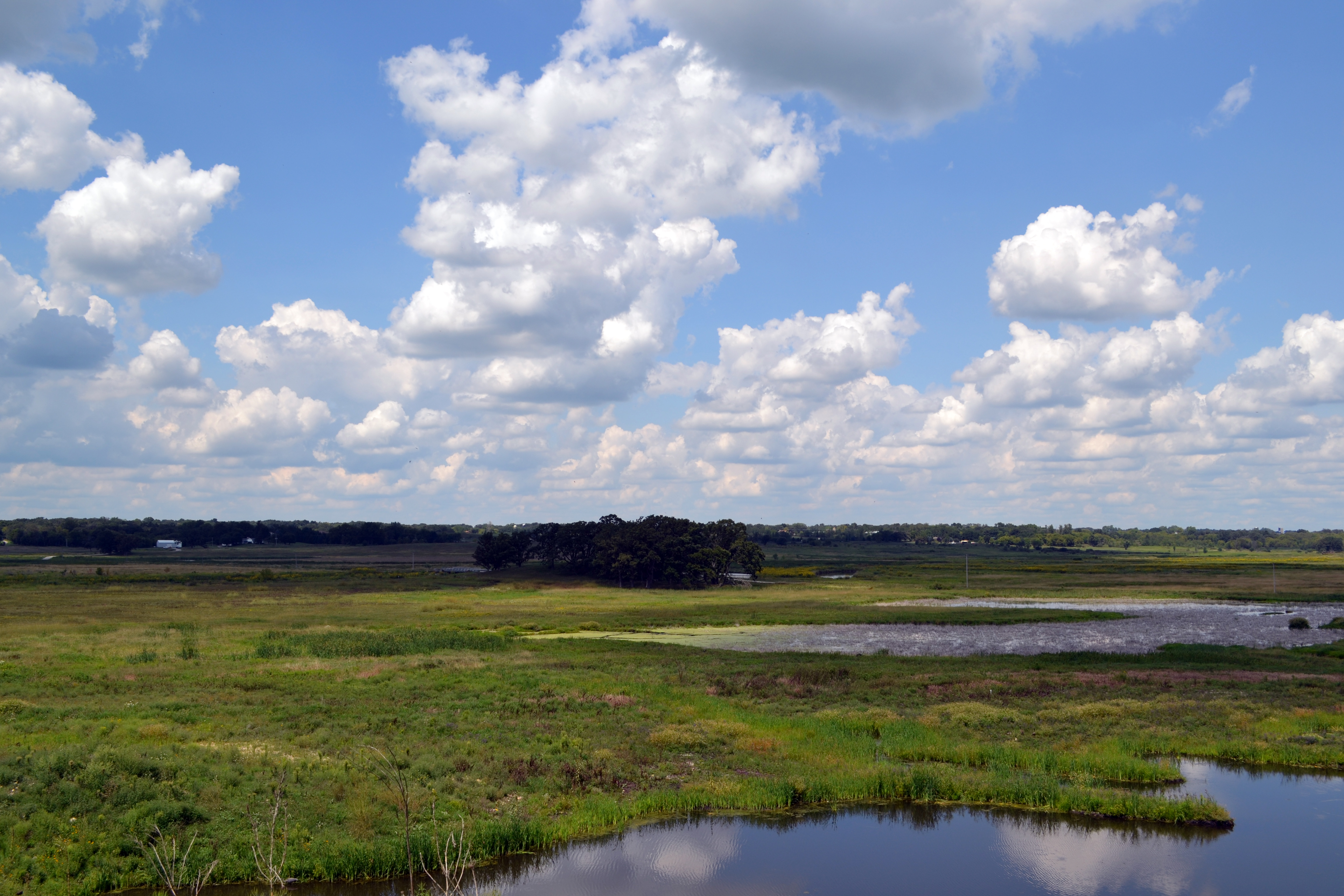
Glacial Park, part of Hackmatack National Wildlife Refuge

The Hackmatack National Wildlife Refuge is a United States national wildlife refuge that includes noncontiguous properties, especially tallgrass prairie patches, wetland properties, and oak savanna parcels, located in the northwestern region of the Chicago metropolitan area and the southern part of the Milwaukee area. The refuge's boundaries encompass parts of McHenry County, Illinois, and Walworth County, Wisconsin. The refuge is operated by the United States Fish and Wildlife Service, (USFWS). 85 percent of the refuge is in Illinois, and 15 percent in Wisconsin.

The refuge covers 11,200 acres of land in Illinois and Wisconsin, which complements 23,000 acres for public use or under environmental protection. Existing parklands adjacent to the refuge's boundaries include several McHenry County Conservation District areas.

"Hackmatack" is a term of Native American origin for the American tamarack or Larix laricina, a conifer formerly abundant in regional wetlands.

109 separate threatened or endangered species, including 49 species of birds, were listed within the area being studied for the proposed refuge designation. Examples of endangered fauna that find a home within the boundaries of the refuge include the Blanding's turtle.

== History ==
The Hackmatack wetlands were a traditional home to the Potawatomi tribe of Native Americans of the United States, who utilized them for fishing, waterfowl hunting, and the gathering of plants used as food and medicine. During the rapid population growth of the 20th century, many of the wetlands within the Hackmatack ecosystem were drained and altered for residential development, while others, such as Volo Bog State Natural Area near Fox Lake, Illinois, were preserved.

=== Planning ===
In October 2010, USFWS held four meetings, two each in Illinois and Wisconsin, to discuss plans for the proposed refuge. In addition, the USFWS continued to accept public comments on the proposed refuge into 2011. The USFWS stated that they expected to release a draft environmental assessment of the proposal in late spring 2011.

Following this comment procedure, the USFWS designated the proposed refuge for approval in August 2012. The refuge will not be officially established until legal interest in lands are acquired, through purchase or donation. The legal interest may encompass anything from fee simple ownership to conservation easement. Purchase of land interest was made dependent upon congressional approval and appropriation of funds. Lands in Lake County, Illinois, Kenosha County, Wisconsin, and Racine County, Wisconsin were considered for inclusion in the new refuge, but were left outside its boundaries in the August 2012 announcement.

=== Land acquisitions ===
The State of Illinois announced acquisition of the first parcel land designated for inclusion in the new refuge, a 72-acre plot in northern McHenry County, in February 2013. The acquisition was made for $511,000. Acquisition of the land by a public-sector body triggered the completion of the legal act of creating the new refuge.

In 2018, the first 86 acres of the refuge opened in Wisconsin.

The acquisition of a 985-acre land parcel, Tamarack Farms, was announced on March 21, 2024. A former hunting club and retreat center adjacent to Richmond, Illinois, the parcel includes wetland and oak savanna suitable for inclusion in the Wildlife Refuge.
