= Siskiwit River =

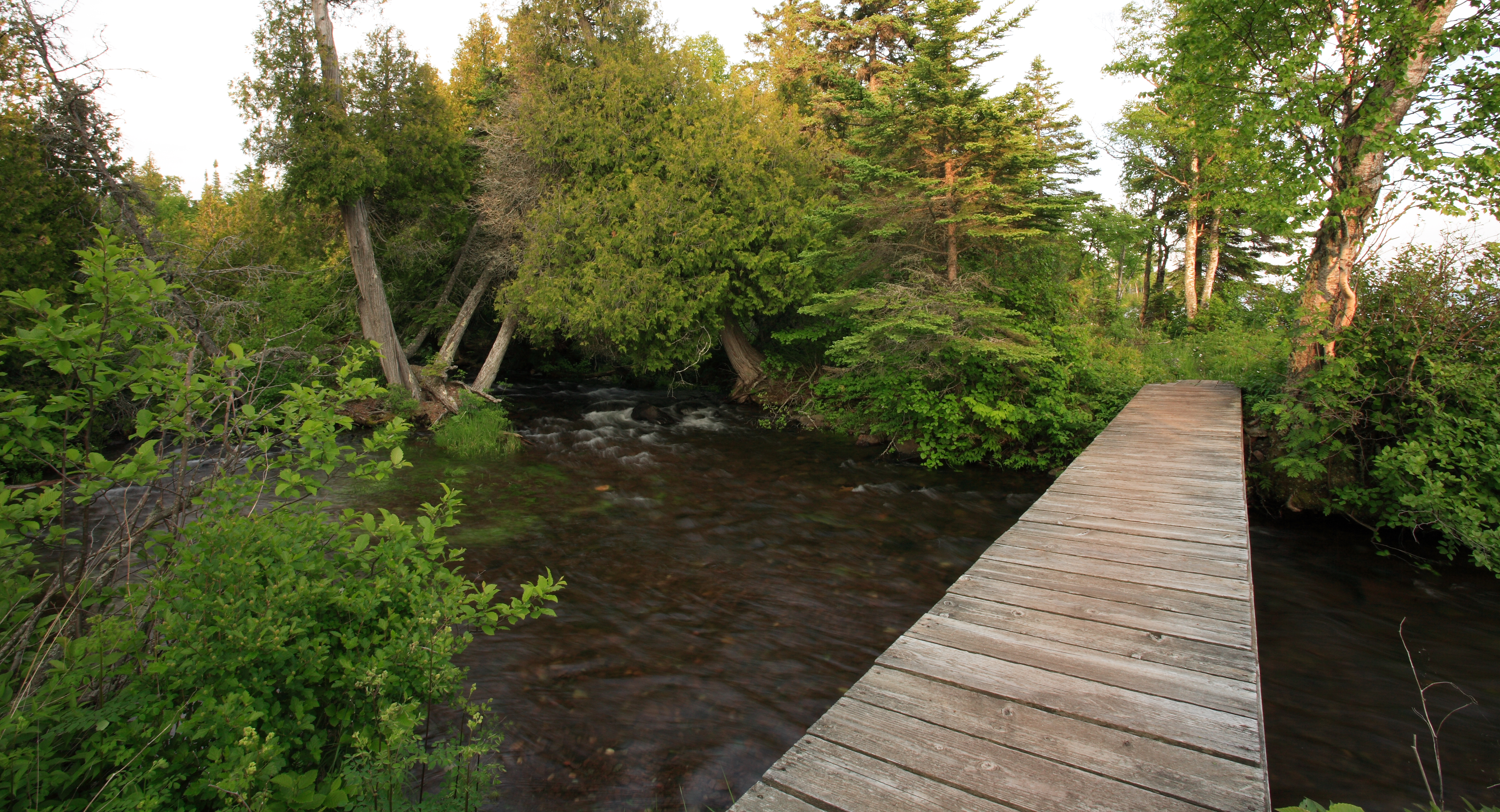
- A boardwalk spanning Siskiwit River

Location
- Country: United States

Physical characteristics
- Source
  - location: Michigan
- Mouth
  - location: 47°59′06″N 88°48′10″W

The Siskiwit River is a 0.4-mile-long (0.64 km) stream on Isle Royale in Lake Superior, in the U.S. state of Michigan. It forms the outlet of Siskwit Lake and drops 57 feet (17 m) over its short course, flowing over Siskwit Falls and entering Lake Superior at Malone Bay.

== See also ==
- List of rivers of Michigan
