= Carp (disambiguation) =

A carp is a type of fish. To carp is to complain.

Carp may also refer to:

in watercraft:

- USS Carp (SS-20), American submarine (1911–1917)
- USS Carp (SS-338), American submarine (1943–1971)
- USNS Marine Carp (T-AP-199), American transport (1945–1958)
- Russian submarine K-239 Carp

in geography:

- Carp, Ontario, Canada
  - CFS Carp, a Cold War museum in the community (a.k.a. The Diefenbunker)
  - Carp Hills, a landmass in the community
  - Carp Road, a road bisecting the community
  - Carp Airport, a general aviation airport south of the community
- Carp, Indiana, United States
- Carp, Nevada, United States

in other uses:

- Carp (name), and persons with it
- Hiroshima Toyo Carp, a Japanese baseball team
- Carp, a musical group that featured Gary Busey

CARP may also stand for:

in organizations:

- CARP (Canada), formerly called the Canadian Association of Retired Persons, a senior's advocacy group
- Club Atlético River Plate, Argentine sports club
- Committee for Support to the Reconstruction of the Party (Marxist-Leninist), a Portuguese communist group
- Copyright Arbitration Royalty Panel, a United States government body
- Cultural Assets Rehabilitation Project, an Eritrean architectural heritage project
- Collegiate Association for the Research of Principles, a group affiliated with the Unification Church
- Central Asset Recovery Professionals, an organization started by British comedian John Oliver to illustrate the lack of regulation of the debt buying industry in the United States

in other uses:

- Comprehensive Agrarian Reform Program, a Philippine government policy
- Cache Array Routing Protocol, a computer protocol for HTTP server acceleration
- Common Address Redundancy Protocol, a computer networking protocol to handle fail-over
- Confluent and reticulated papillomatosis, a genetic disorder

== See also ==
- Cari (disambiguation)
- The Carp (disambiguation)
- Carp Lake (disambiguation)
- Carp River (disambiguation)
- karp (disambiguation)
- Carpi people
- crap (disambiguation)
