= Carp River =

Carp River may refer to:

== Canada ==
- Carp River (Algoma District) in Algoma District, Ontario, which empties into Batchawana Bay on northeastern Lake Superior
- Carp River (Ottawa) in the city of Ottawa, Ontario, which empties into the Ottawa River

== United States ==
- One of several Carp Rivers in Michigan including:
  - Carp River (Gogebic-Ontonagon counties), in the Porcupine Mountains empties into Lake Superior
  - Carp River (Luce County), empties into Lake Superior near the Crisp Point Light
  - Carp River (Mackinac County), a federally designated Wild and Scenic River in the Upper Peninsula flowing into St. Martin Bay on Lake Huron
  - Carp River (Marquette County), empties into Lake Superior in Marquette
  - Leland River, in Leelanau County, formerly known as Carp River
  - Waiska River, in Chippewa County, formerly known as Carp River

== See also ==
- Carp Lake River, Emmet County, Michigan
- Little Carp River (disambiguation)
- Carp (disambiguation)
- Carp Lake (disambiguation)
