= Carp Lake =

Carp Lake may refer to:

- Carp Lake Township, Emmet County, Michigan, United States
  - Carp Lake, Michigan, a census-designated place in the eastern part of the township in Emmet County
- Carp Lake Township, Ontonagon County, Michigan, United States
- Carp Lake (Minnesota/Ontario), an international lake
- "Carp Lake", an alternate name for a portion of the Leland River in Leelanau County, Michigan, United States
- "Carp Lake", historical name for Lake Paradise (Michigan), United States
- Carp Lake Provincial Park, British Columbia, Canada
  - Carp Lake, a lake within the park, part of the Peace River watershed
- Carp Lake or Liyu Lake, a lake in Hualien County, Taiwan

== See also ==
- Carp (disambiguation)
- Karp (disambiguation)
