= Karp (surname) =

Karp is a surname. Notable people with the surname include:

- Alex Karp, CEO of Palantir Technologies
- Algo Kärp (born 1985), Estonian cross-country skier
- Barrie Karp (born 1945), American philosopher and visual artist
- Bob Karp (1911–1975), American comics writer
- Brad S. Karp (born 1960), American litigator
- Brad Karp, American computer scientist
- Carol Karp (1926–1972), American mathematician, professor at the University of Maryland
- Cary Karp (born 1947), Swedish museum curator
- David Karp (disambiguation)
- Edmund Karp (1913–2000), Estonian footballer
- Eliane Karp (born 1955), French–Peruvian anthropologist and economist
- Gail Karp (born 1955), Jewish-American cantor
- Guido Karp (born 1963), German music photographer
- Harvey Karp (born 1951), American pediatrician
- Jensen Karp (born 1983), American art dealer, producer, podcaster and former rapper
- Kobi Karp (born 1962), American. architect
- Lila Karp (1933–2008), American activist, writer, teacher and feminist
- Marcelle Karp (born 1964), U.S. feminist writer and director, pen name Betty Boob
- Natalia Karp (1911–2007), pianist and Holocaust survivor
- Raine Karp (born 1939), Estonian architect
- Richard M. Karp (born 1935), American computer scientist
- Robert Karp (1911–1975), American comics writer
- Ryan Karp (born 1970), American baseball player
- Sophia Karp (1861–1904), Romanian-born Jewish actress and soprano
- Stephen R. Karp (born 1941), American real estate developer
- Tal Karp (born 1981), female Australian footballer
- Tom Karp (born 1946), American tennis player
- Theodore Cyrus Karp (born 1926), American musicologist
- Walter Karp (1934–1989), American writer and historian

== See also ==
- Karp (given name)
- Karpa (surname)
- Franz Samuel Karpe (1747-1806), Slovenian philosopher
- Henry C. Karpen (c.1868–1936), New York assemblyman
