= Karp =

Karp may refer to:

== Places ==
- Karp, Podlaskie Voivodeship, in north-east Poland
- Karp, Lublin Voivodeship, in east Poland

== People ==
- Karp (surname)
- Karp (given name)

== Other uses ==
- KARP-FM, a radio station in Dassel, Minnesota, United States
- Karp (band), an American 1990s rock band
- Karp class submarine, ordered in 1904 by the Russian Empire, also the namesake submarine in the class
- Korean Association of Retired Persons, a non-governmental organization affiliated with the United Nations
- Karp (coat of arms), Polish noble coat of arms

== See also ==
- Karpa (surname)
- Magikarp (Pokémon)
- Carp (disambiguation)
