= Carp River (Michigan) =

Carp River is the name of several rivers in the U.S. state of Michigan.

- Carp River (Gogebic-Ontonagon counties), in the Porcupine Mountains empties into Lake Superior at
- Carp River (Luce County), empties into Lake Superior at near the Crisp Point Light.
- Carp River (Mackinac County), a federally designated Wild and Scenic River in the Upper Peninsula flowing into St. Martin Bay on Lake Huron
- Carp River (Marquette County), empties into Lake Superior in Marquette at
- Leland River, in Leelanau County, was formerly known as Carp River.
- Threemile Creek, in Luce County, was formerly known as Carp River.
- Waiska River, in Chippewa County, was formerly known as Carp River.
- The Marquette, Michigan post office was established on January 12, 1847 as Carp River. The name changed to Marquette on April 17, 1856.

== See also ==
- Carp Lake River
- Little Carp River
