= Carp Lake Township, Michigan =

Carp Lake Township is the name of some places in the U.S. state of Michigan:

- Carp Lake Township, Emmet County, Michigan
- Carp Lake Township, Ontonagon County, Michigan
