= Little Carp River (Cheboygan County) =

Location
- Country: United States

Physical characteristics
- Source
  - location: Munro Township, Cheboygan County, Michigan
- Mouth
  - location: Burt Lake
  - elevation: 594 ft (181 m)

The Little Carp River is a 1.6-mile-long (2.6 km) stream in Cheboygan County in the U.S. state of Michigan.

The river begins in Munro Township at 45°33′19″N 84°41′15″W, just south of Douglas Lake, and flows south into Burt Township and empties into Burt Lake at 45°32′11″N 84°40′39″W. The river is also known as "Carp Creek" and "Carp River".

== See also ==
- Little Carp River, other streams with the same name
- Carp River (Michigan)
