= Tlacoquemecatl Arts Garden =

Tlacoquemecatl Arts Garden is also known as “Tlaco” or “Tlacoquemecatl Park." It is bordered by Adolfo Prieto, Moras, Tlacoquemécatl and Pilares streets in Del Valle neighborhood.

== History ==
This park is located in the land that used to be part of Santa Anita Ranch. In Santa Anita Ranch they used to cultivate alfalfa to feed cows and horses on the property. Water was supplied by three wells which were regenerated in the rainy seasons by streams running through the land were the park is today.

At the end of the 19th century, the cultivation of fruit trees was very popular in the area. The most abundant were the tejocotes (a Mexican fruit). Ash trees also abounded in the region, the same ones that are part of the landscape today. This part of the municipality remained unchanged until 1958, when the president Adolfo López Mateos carried out the necessary expropriations and turn the land to one of the most iconic parks of the municipality.

There is a church in the park that is called Church of Our Lord of the Good Handling (Iglesia de Nuestro Señor del Buen Despacho, in Spanish) and it is located in what used to be a small chapel of the 17th century. The origins of the temple are from the 19th century. In 1959 the last reshuffle was made to the church.

== Attractions ==
The Church of Our Lord of the Good Handling is an important characteristic of the park. This church has suffered of many modifications but of the original one it is preserved the sacristy as well as the rood located in the atrium. The crucifix bears some native motifs where it is represented the absorption of the prehispanic people into the catholic church. Another important thing of this church, is that a stone that comes from an ancient construction that used to be in this place is preserved in the altar.

The main tree species that are located in the park are elm trees, jacaranda, palms and privets (bush). Also art exhibitions are organized during weekends (that is the origin of the name “Tlacoquemecatl Arts Garden”). In one of the footpaths of the park there is a commemorative plaque to Carlos Gardel, the best known representative in the history of tango, inaugurated in 1990 by the Mexican Association of Tango (Asociación de Tangueros de México in Spanish).

19°22′43.79″N 99°10′17.91″W
