= Crépeau =

Crépeau is a French surname derived from the Latin word crispus and the Old French word cresp, crespe ("fuzzy hair"), as a nickname for people with curly hair.

== People ==
=== Crépeau ===
- Armand-Charles Crépeau, Canadian politician who represented the provincial riding of Sherbrooke
- Aurélie Crépeau (1833–1910), Canadian Catholic nun
- Claude Crépeau (born 1962), Canadian cryptographer and academic
- François Crépeau (born 1960), Canadian lawyer and academic
- Jeanne Crépeau (born 1961), Canadian film director and screenwriter
- Maxime Crépeau (born 1994), Canadian soccer player
- Michel Crépeau (1930–1999), French politician and lawyer, former mayor of La Rochelle
- Paul-André Crépeau (1926–2011), Canadian lawyer and academic

=== Crépeaux ===
- Robert Crépeaux (1900–1994), French chess master

== See also ==
- Médiathèque Michel-Crépeau, a library in La Rochelle named after Michel Crépeau
- Crapo (disambiguation)
