= Grievance (disambiguation) =

A grievance is a legal wrong or hardship.

Grievance or Grievances may also refer to:

- Grievance (labour), a formal complaint in the workplace
- Grievance (song), on the album Binaural by Pearl Jam (2000)
- Grievance (novel), by K. C. Constantine (2000)
- Grievance Blues, a song by Lightnin' Hopkins (1960)
- Grievances (album), by Rolo Tomassi (2015)
- Grievances, a novel by Mark Ethridge (2006)

== See also ==
- Complaint (disambiguation)
- Grievance redressal, a process for handling complaints commonly used in India
- Greed versus grievance in political science
