= David Karp (disambiguation) =

David Karp (born 1986) is the founder of Tumblr.

David or Dave Karp may also refer to:

- David Karp (novelist) (1922–1999), American novelist and television writer, who also used the pseudonyms Wallace Ware and Adam Singer
- David Karp (pomologist) (born 1958), American culinary journalist
- David A. Karp (born 1944), American sociologist
- Dave Karp, a character in the 1992 film The Mighty Ducks
