= USNS Marine Adder =

1945 American troop ship

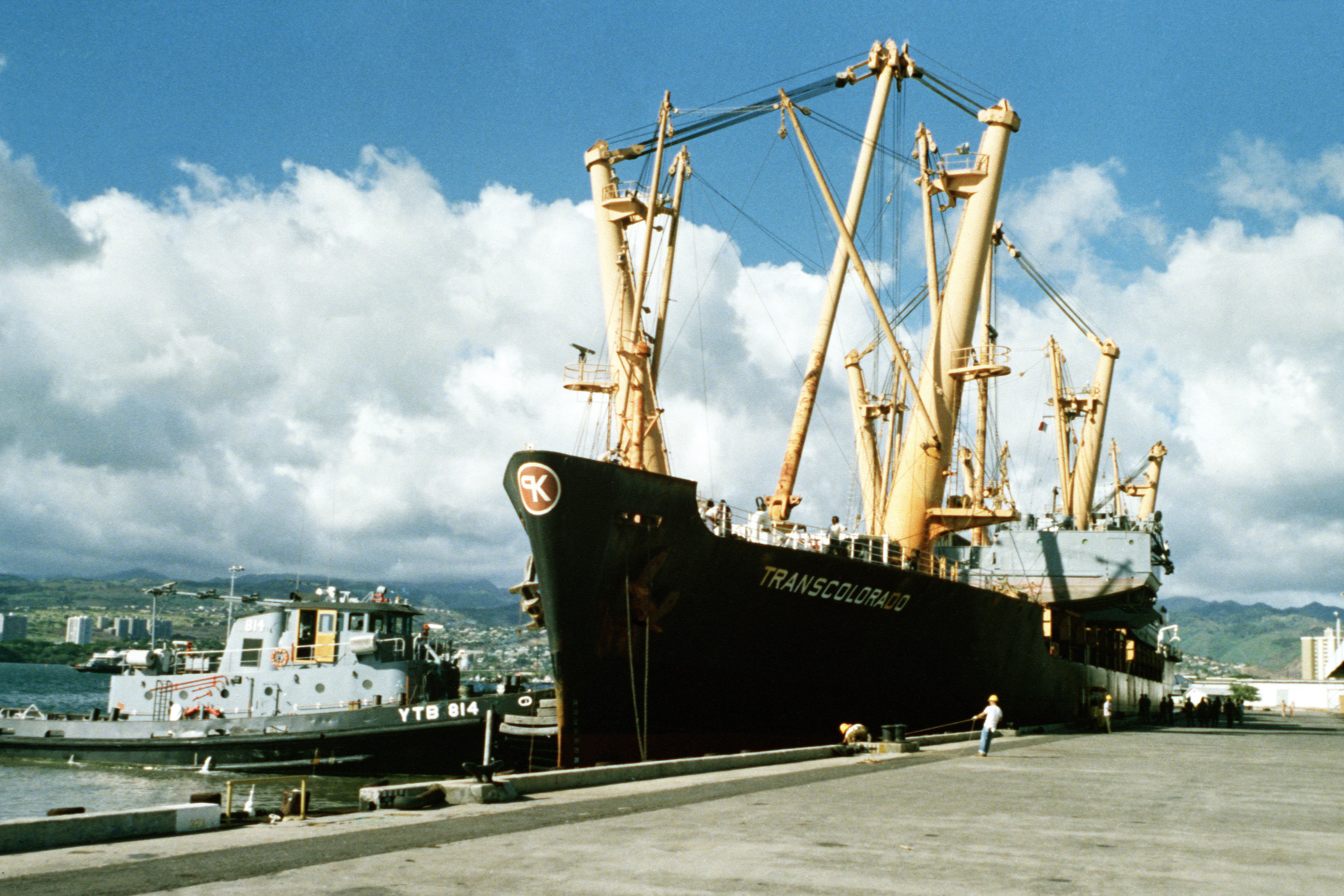

History
- Name: Marine Adder
- Owner: War Shipping Administration
- Operator: American President Lines
- Port of registry: (United States) Portland, Oregon
- Builder: Kaiser Company; Richmond, California
- Yard number: 46
- Laid down: 7 March 1945
- Launched: 16 May 1945
- Sponsored by: Mrs. L. Jorstad
- Completed: 5 October 1945
- Out of service: 1947
- Identification: U.S. O/N: 248806; IMO number: 5224728
- Fate: laid up in NDRF, 1947

History

United States
- Name: UMarine Adder
- Acquired: 24 July 1950
- Out of service: 8 June 1957
- Fate: laid up in NDRF, June 1957

History
- Name: Transcolorado
- Owner: Hudson Waterways Corporation
- Port of registry: (United States)
- Acquired: 4 August 1967
- Refit: converted to cargo ship, 1967–68
- Reclassified: T-AK-2005, as chartered vessel for MSC, 1968
- Fate: Scrapped, May 1988

General characteristics
- Class & type: Marine Adder-class transport
- Displacement: 10,210 long tons (10,370 t)
- Length: 523 ft (159 m)
- Beam: 72 ft (22 m)
- Draft: 26 ft (7.9 m)
- Speed: 17 knots (31 km/h)
- Troops: 3,674

USNS Marine Adder (T-AP–193) was a troop ship for the United States Navy in the 1950s. She was built in 1945 for the United States Maritime Commission as SS Marine Adder, a Type C4-S-A3 troop ship, by the Kaiser Company during World War II. In 1950, the ship was transferred to the Military Sea Transport Service of the U.S. Navy as a United States Naval Ship staffed by a civilian crew. After ending her naval service in 1957, she entered the National Defense Reserve Fleet, but was sold for commercial use in 1967. She was used in part to carry supplies to support the Vietnam War efforts. During the Summer of 1972 while in Da Nang Port, South Vietnam, a limpet mine was attached to the vessel by a swimmer, blowing a hole in the hull upon detonation. In order to save the ship, the Skipper ran it aground in the Da Nang harbor. The US Navy standby salvage ship USS Grasp (ARS 24) with its crew of divers installed a box patch over the hole and pumped the water from the bilges, before moving the ship to a pier. US Army tanks hung from ship booms to heel the ship so that a metal patch could be welded in place to return the ship to duty. SS Transcolorado, she was chartered by the Military Sealift Command as a civilian cargo ship designated T-AK-2005.

== Career ==
Marine Adder was laid down under a United States Maritime Commission contract by the Kaiser Company of Richmond, California on 7 March 1945 and launched on 16 May 1945 sponsored by Mrs. L. Jorstad. The ship was delivered to the War Shipping Administration for operation by its agent American President Lines on 5 October 1945. Marine Adder operated as a troop transport allocated to Army requirements.

Marine Adder departed San Francisco early in November and sailed to Saipan where she embarked returning servicemen. She arrived at San Pedro, California in early December, then sailed on a second trooplift on 29 December. She steamed to the Marianas, the Philippines, Korea, and Okinawa before returning to Seattle in March 1946. Between April and June she completed a Pacific run to Calcutta, India, and to Shanghai, China. On 13 February 1948 San Francisco Marine Adder was placed in the Maritime Commission Reserve Fleet at Suisun Bay, California.

After communist forces invaded South Korea, Marine Adder was acquired by the Navy from the Maritime Commission on 24 July 1950 and assigned to the Military Sea Transportation Service (MSTS) on 1 August 1950. Staffed by a civilian crew, she carried combat troops to the Far East and arrived in Korean waters on 14 December 1950. After returning to the west coast in mid-January 1951, she resumed her support of the United Nations Command in Korea less than 2 months later and continued Far Eastern runs during the Korean War. Between 6 March 1951 and 5 September 1953, she made 17 voyages out of Seattle to ports in Japan and South Korea, including Yokosuka, Sasebo, Pusan, and Inchon. After reaching San Francisco on 5 September 1953 with homeward-bound veterans of the war, she arrived Seattle on 8 September and was placed in reduced operational status.

Marine Adder resumed MSTS service on 4 June 1954. During the next two months she completed two runs to Japanese and Korean waters; thence, she departed Seattle on 21 August to take part in “Passage‑to‑Freedom” operations along the coast of French Indochina. Steaming via Yokosuka, she arrived Haiphong on 9 September and embarked Vietnamese headed from the north to the south. Departing on 14 September, she made six runs to Vietnamese ports including Saigon and Tourane, and during the next two months carried refugees, French troops, and military cargo. She departed Vietnamese waters on 14 November, touched at Yokosuka the 21st, and reached Seattle on 6 December. She resumed reduced operational status on 14 December.

On 24 December 1955 Marine Adder sailed again for the Far East. She reached Inchon on 11 January 1956; operated between Korean and Japanese ports until 21 January; thence returned to Seattle via San Francisco on 6 February. Placed in reduced operational status on 10 February, she remained at Seattle until 3 June 1957 when she steamed to Astoria, Oregon. She entered the National Defense Reserve Fleet on 8 June 1957 and was transferred permanently to custody of the Maritime Administration (a successor to the Maritime Commission) on 6 June 1958. Her name was struck from the Naval Vessel Register on 6 June 1958. Marine Adder received eight battle stars for Korean service.

== Commercial service ==
She was sold to Hudson Waterways Corp., 4 August 1967, converted to a cargo ship, and renamed Transcolorado. On 26 July 1968, Transcolorado was chartered by the U.S. Navy's Military Sealift Command (a successor to the Military Sea Transportation Service), designated as "T-AK-2005", and employed for carrying cargo. Transcolorado was scrapped on 20 May 1988.

== Bibliography ==
- Grover, David (1987). U.S. Army Ships and Watercraft of World War II. Naval Institute Press. ISBN 0-87021-766-6. LCCN 87015514.
- Maritime Administration. "Marine Adder". Ship History Database Vessel Status Card. U.S. Department of Transportation, Maritime Administration. Archived from the original on 2015-04-18.
- Naval History And Heritage Command. "Marine Adder". Dictionary of American Naval Fighting Ships. Naval History And Heritage Command.
- Priolo, Gary P. (21 September 2007). "USNS Marine Adder (T-AP-193)". NavSource.
