= Marine Adder-class transport =

American Type C4-class ship built during World War II

Class overview
- Operators: United States Navy
- Built: November 1944 – August 1945
- In service: 1945–1967
- Completed: 7
- Lost: 0
- Retired: 7
- Preserved: 0

General characteristics
- Type: transport
- Displacement: 6,720 long tons (6,830 t) light; 10,210 long tons (10,370 t) full load
- Length: 523 ft (159 m)
- Beam: 72 ft (22 m)
- Draft: 26 ft (7.9 m)
- Installed power: 13,750 shp (10,250 kW)
- Propulsion: 1 × steam turbine; 1 x propeller
- Speed: 18 kn (33 km/h; 21 mph)
- Capacity: 53,000 cu ft (1,500 m^{3})
- Troops: 3,451

The Marine Adder class of transports were Type C4-class ship built for the United States Maritime Commission (MARCOM) during World War II. They were converted after the war for use by the United States Navy (USN) for troop transports. Marine Adder-class ships also served in the Korean War.

== Marine Adder-class transport ==
- USNS Marine Adder (T-AP-193)
- USNS Marine Lynx (T-AP-194)
- USNS Marine Phoenix (T-AP-195)
- USNS Marine Carp (T-AP-199)
- USNS Marine Jumper (T-AP-200)
- USNS Marine Marlin (T-AP-201)
- USNS Marine Serpent (T-AP-202)

== Bibliography ==
- American Merchant Marine at War - C4 ships
- US Maritime Commission Details and Outboard Profiles of Maritime Commission Vessels, The C4 Cargo Ship, Conversions and Subdesigns
- US Maritime Commission overview
- US Maritime Commission - Technical Specifications for Ships including definitions of terms
- From America to United States: The History of the Long-Range Merchant Shipbuilding Programme of the United States Maritime Commission, by L.A. Sawyer and W.H. Mitchell. London, 1981, World Ship Society
- Ships for Victory: A History of Shipbuilding under the U.S. Maritime Commission in World War II, by Frederic C. Lane ISBN 0-8018-6752-5
