= Carpus (disambiguation) =

Carpus is a Latin word for "wrist".

Carpus may also refer to:

- Carpus Loveland, American politician active in the 1870s
- Carpus of Antioch, ancient Greek mathematician
- Carpus of Beroea, friend of Paul the Apostle
- Saint Carpus, very early Christian martyr

== See also ==
- Karpos, youth in Greek mythology famed for his beauty
- Karp (given name)
