= Crap =

Crap or craps may refer to:

- Crap, a slang term for feces
- Craps, a dice game
- Craps (album), by Big Dipper, 1988
- Commandos de recherche et d'action en profondeur, the former name of France's Commando Parachute Group
- "Create, replicate, append, process", a version of create, read, update and delete, in computer programming
- Andreas Crap, member of German band Oomph!
- Lars Craps (born 2001), Belgian racing cyclist

== See also ==
- Crapo (disambiguation)
- Krap, a musical instrument
- Krapp, a surname
- Thomas Crapper (c. 1836–1910), inventor of sanitary equipment
