= Carp (surname) =

Carp is a surname. Notable people with the surname include:

- Berend Carp (1901–1966), South-African naturalist
- Corneliu Carp (1895–1982), Romanian general in World War II
- Daniel Carp (born 1948), American businessman
- Johan Carp (1897–1962), Dutch sailor
- Mike Carp (born 1986), American baseball player
- Mircea Carp (born 1952), Romanian sailor
- Petre P. Carp (1837–1919), Romanian politician

== See also ==
- Karp (surname)
