= USNS Marine Phoenix =

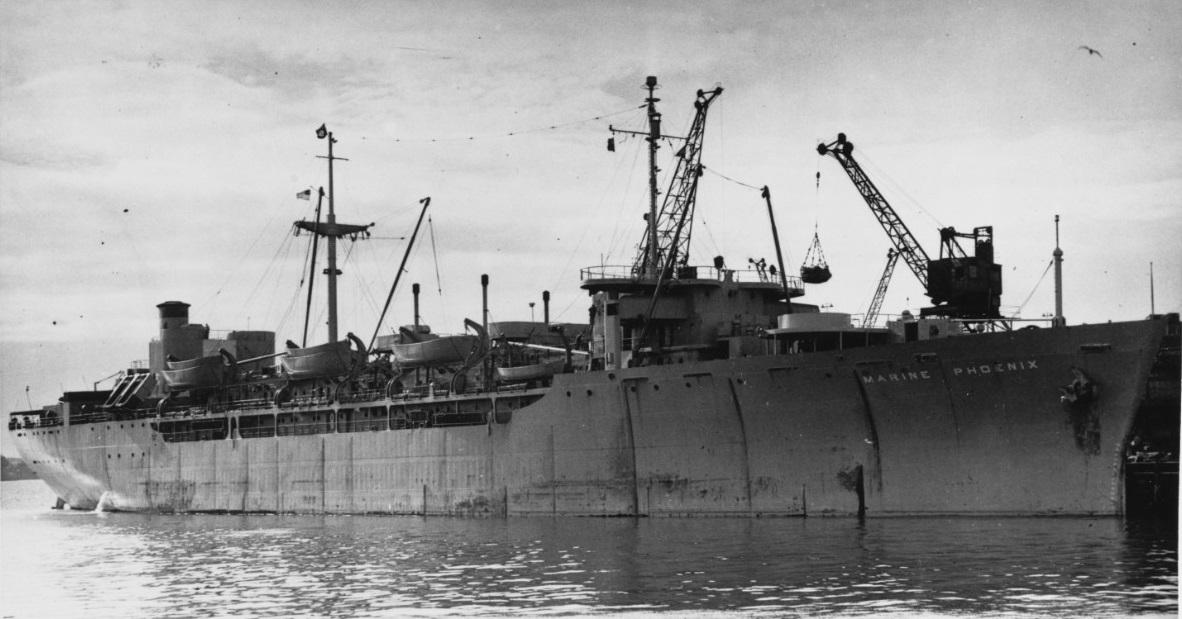
- SS Marine Phoenix which served as USNS Marine Phoenix (T-AP-195) in 1950-1958.

History

United States
- Name: Marine Phoenix
- Owner: United States Maritime Commission (MARCOM)
- Operator: Moore-McCormack Lines (October 1945–April 1946); Matson Navigation Co. (April 1946–June 1946); American President Lines (June 1946–September 1948)
- Ordered: as a Type C4-S-A3 hull, MCE hull 2365
- Builder: Kaiser Shipbuilding Company, Vancouver, Washington
- Cost: $8,000,000
- Yard number: 512
- Way number: 3
- Laid down: 16 December 1944
- Launched: 9 August 1945
- Sponsored by: Mrs. Thomas M.Robins
- Acquired: 22 October 1945
- Identification: Code letters: KPHA
- Fate: Laid up in the National Defense Reserve Fleet, Suisun Bay Group, Benicia, California, 1 September 1948; Transferred to US Navy, 21 July 1950

United States
- Name: Marine Phoenix
- Namesake: A merchant name retained
- Operator: Military Sea Transportation Service (MSTS)
- In service: 21 July 1950
- Out of service: 1 May 1958
- Stricken: 1 May 1958
- Identification: Hull symbol: T-AP-195; Code letters: NEAT
- Fate: Laid up in the National Defense Reserve Fleet, Astoria Group, 3 November 1958; Exchanged for commercial operations, 24 April 1967

United States
- Name: Mohawk
- Owner: Mohawk Shipping Inc.
- In service: 24 April 1967
- Identification: IMO number: 5224950
- Fate: Sold for scrapping, 1979

General characteristics
- Class & type: Marine Adder-class transport
- Type: Type C4-S-A3
- Displacement: 6,720 long tons (6,830 t) (light load); 10,210 long tons (10,370 t) (full load)
- Length: 523 ft (159 m)
- Beam: 72 ft (22 m)
- Draft: 26 ft (7.9 m)
- Installed power: 13,750 shp (10,250 kW)
- Propulsion: 1 × Steam turbine; 1 x propeller
- Speed: 18 kn (33 km/h; 21 mph)
- Capacity: 53,000 cu ft (1,500 m^{3})
- Troops: 3,451

Service record
- Operations: North Korean Aggression (24 September–29 October 1950); First UN Counter Offensive (8–10 February 1951); Communist China Spring Offensive (28–29 April 1951, 13–14 June 1951); UN Summer-Fall Offensive (7–10 August 1951, 20–21 September 1951, 11–13 November 1951); Second Korean Winter (30–31 December 1951, 17–23 February 1952, 10–11 April 1952); Korean Defense Summer-Fall 1952 (20–21 August 1952, 2–3 October 1952, 20–21 November 1952, 23–24 November 1952, 14–15 January 1953); Third Korean Winter (14–15 January 1953); Korean Summer-Fall 1953 (16–20 May 1953, 12–14 July 1953)
- Awards: National Defense Service Medal; Korean Service Medal; United Nations Service Medal; Republic of Korea War Service Medal

USS Marine Phoenix (T-AP-195) was a Marine Adder-class transport that saw service with the US Navy for the task of transporting troops to and from combat areas. She was of the C4-S-A3 design type.

== Construction ==
Marine Phoenix, approved 18 April 1944, was laid down by Kaiser Shipbuilding Co., Vancouver, Washington, 16 December 1944, as MC Hull no. 2365; launched 9 August 1945; sponsored by Mrs. Thomas M. Robins; and delivered to her operator, Moore-McCormack Lines, 9 November 1945.

== Service history ==
The ship operated as a War Shipping Administration (WSA) troop transport from 27 October 1945 delivery until 1946. On 12 December 1945 Marine Phoenix departed Seattle, Washington with occupation troops for Nagoya Japan. There she embarked homeward‑bound veterans of the Pacific campaigns and departed for Seattle 4 January arriving 16 January 1946. After voyage repairs During the next five months she continued trooplift runs out of Seattle, to Japan, Korea, China, the Marianas, and the Hawaiian Islands. In 1947, she entered the Maritime Commission Reserve Fleet at Suisun Bay, California, where she remained for 3 years.

Following the invasion of South Korea by North Korean Communists, Marine Phoenix was acquired by the US Navy from the Maritime Commission 21 July 1950; placed in service August 1950; and assigned to duty with Military Sea Transportation Service (MSTS). Crewed by the civil service, she began trooplifts to the Far East later in August, and reached Korean waters 2 September. During the next 3 years she bolstered the free world's stand to repel Communist aggression in Korea, and completed 19 round trips to the western Pacific and back. Operating out of Seattle and San Francisco, she carried troops and supplies to Japanese and Korean ports including Sasebo, Yokohama, Pusan, and Inchon. In addition during February 1952, she shuttled troops to Kojedo Island in response to mounting unrest among POWs through Communist agitators. Following the uneasy armistice which ended hostilities in Korea, she returned veterans to the United States. After reaching Seattle, from Inchon, 5 December 1953, she was placed in reduced operational status until 30 April 1954.

Marine Phoenix, then resumed transport service in the Far East, and during the remainder of the year she made six runs to the western Pacific out of west coast ports including Seattle and San Diego. Returning to Seattle, 3 January 1955, she resumed reduced operational status until 4 December; she sailed for South Korea, 9 December. She reached Inchon, 27 December; shuttled troops to Japan and Okinawa; and, from 3 to 19 January 1956, steamed to the west coast. Between 30 January and 14 March, she completed one more round trip to the Far East; then was again in reduced status at Seattle.

== Fate ==
On 3 November 1958, she arrived Astoria, Oregon, where she transferred to the Maritime Administration and was placed with the National Defense Reserve Fleet in the Columbia River Group. Her name was struck from the Navy list the same day. Marine Phoenix was sold to Mohawk Shipping Inc., 25 April 1967, converted to a general cargo ship and renamed Mohawk. In 1979, Mohawk was sold for scrapping in Taiwan.

== Awards ==
Marine Phoenix received eight battle stars for Korean service.

== Bibliography ==
Online resources

- "Marine Phoenix". Dictionary of American Naval Fighting Ships. Naval History and Heritage Command. 5 August 2015.
- "Kaiser Vancouver, Vancouver WA". Shipbuilding History. 27 November 2010.
- "USS Marine Phoenix (T-AP-195)". NavSource. 3 March 2017.
- "Marine Phoenix (T-AP-195)". United States Department of Transportation. Archived from the original on November 3, 2016.
- "USNS Marine Phoenix".
