= The Carp =

The Carp may refer to:

- WGNW, a radio station (99.9 FM) licensed to Cornell, Wisconsin, United States
- The Carp (opera), a one-act comic opera with a libretto by Frank Desprez and music by Alfred Cellier

== See also ==
- Carp (disambiguation)
