= USNS Marine Lynx =

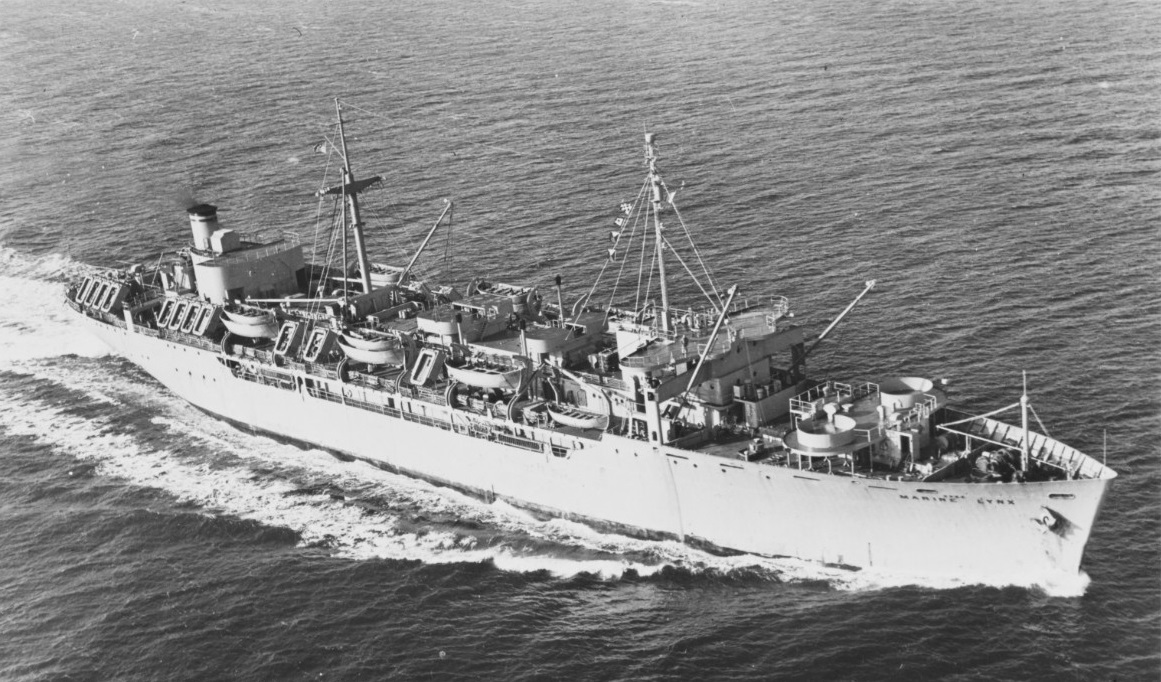
- USNS Marine Lynx (T-AP-194) underway during the 1950s.

History

United States
- Name: Marine Lynx
- Owner: United States Maritime Commission (MARCOM)
- Operator: Moore-McCormack Lines (October 1945–April 1946); Matson Navigation Co. (April 1946–June 1946); American President Lines (June 1946–September 1948)
- Ordered: as a Type C4-S-A3 hull, MCE hull 2363
- Builder: Kaiser Shipbuilding Company, Vancouver, Washington
- Cost: $8,000,000
- Yard number: 510
- Way number: 1
- Laid down: 9 December 1944
- Launched: 17 July 1945
- Sponsored by: Mrs. Henry Brockrick
- Acquired: 22 October 1945
- Identification: Code letters: KPGQ
- Fate: Laid up in the National Defense Reserve Fleet, Suisun Bay Group, Benicia, California, 14 September 1948; Transferred to US Navy, 23 July 1950

United States
- Name: Marine Lynx
- Namesake: A merchant name retained
- Operator: Military Sea Transportation Service (MSTS)
- In service: 23 July 1950
- Out of service: 1 May 1958
- Stricken: 1 May 1958
- Identification: Hull symbol: T-AP-194
- Fate: Laid up in the National Defense Reserve Fleet, Astoria Group, 1 May 1958; Exchanged for commercial operations, 4 August 1967

United States
- Name: Transcolumbia
- Owner: Hudson Waterways Corp.
- In service: 4 August 1967
- Out of service: 3 October 1968
- Fate: Chartered to Military Sealift Command (MSC), 3 October 1968

United States
- Name: Transcolumbia
- Owner: Hudson Waterways Corp.
- Operator: MSC
- In service: 3 October 1968
- Out of service: 25 August 1985
- Identification: IMO number: 5224912
- Fate: Sold for scrapping, June 1988

General characteristics
- Class & type: Marine Adder-class transport
- Type: Type C4-S-A3
- Displacement: 6,720 long tons (6,830 t) (light load); 10,210 long tons (10,370 t) (full load)
- Length: 523 ft (159 m)
- Beam: 72 ft (22 m)
- Draft: 26 ft (7.9 m)
- Installed power: 13,750 shp (10,250 kW)
- Propulsion: 1 × Steam turbine; 1 x propeller
- Speed: 18 kn (33 km/h; 21 mph)
- Capacity: 53,000 cu ft (1,500 m^{3})
- Troops: 3,451

Service record
- Operations: North Korean Aggression (24 September–29 October 1950); First UN Counter Offensive (8–10 February 1951); Communist China Spring Offensive (28–29 April 1951, 13–14 June 1951); UN Summer-Fall Offensive (7–10 August 1951, 11–13 November 1951); Second Korean Winter (30–31 December 1951, 17–23 February 1952, 10–11 April 1952); Korean Defense Summer-Fall 1952 (20–21 August 1952, 2–3 October 1952, 20–21 November 1952, 23–24 November 1952, 14–15 January 1953); Korean Summer-Fall 1953 (16–20 May 1953, 12–14 July 1953)
- Awards: National Defense Service Medal; Korean Service Medal; United Nations Service Medal; Republic of Korea War Service Medal

USS Marine Lynx (T-AP-194) was a Marine Adder-class transport that saw service with the US Navy for the task of transporting troops to and from combat areas. She was of the C4-S-A3 design type.

== Construction ==
Marine Lynx, approved 18 April 1944, was laid down by Kaiser Shipbuilding Co., Vancouver, Washington, 9 December 1944, as MC Hull no. 2363; launched 17 July 1945; sponsored by Mrs. Henry Brockrick; and delivered to her operator, Moore-McCormack Lines, 22 October 1945.

== Service history ==
Following the end of World War II, Marine Lynx steamed throughout the Pacific to carry occupation troops to the Far East and to return veterans of the Pacific campaigns to the United States. Departing Portland, Oregon, 3 December, she carried troops to Japan and returned to the west coast 4 January 1946. During February and March she cruised out of San Francisco, to the Marianas and back; and, after transferring to Matson Navigation Co., 17 April, she departed 23 April, on a troop run in the South Pacific. She touched at ports in the Fiji Islands and in Australia; returned to the west coast in June; and in 1947, entered the Maritime Commission Reserve Fleet at Suisun Bay, California.

Following the outbreak of Communist aggression In South Korea, Marine Lynx was acquired by the US Navy from the Maritime Commission 23 July 1950; placed in service; and assigned to duty with Military Sea Transportation Service (MSTS). Manned by a civil service crew, she served throughout the years of the Korean conflict carrying US troops to Japan and the war‑torn Korean peninsula. Between mid‑December 1950 and 20 August 1954, she deployed to the Far East out of Seattle, Washington, 22 times. She debarked combat‑ready troops at Yokohama and Sasebo, Japan, and at Pusan and Inchon, South Korea. After the establishment of the uneasy truce 27 July 1953, she cruised primarily to return veterans of the U.N. police action in Korea to the United States.

On 25 August 1954, Marine Lynx sailed once more for the turbulent waters of the Far East. Steaming via Yokosuka, Japan, she reached Haiphong, French Indochina, 13 September, and began duty in the US Navy's Operation "Passage‑to‑Freedom". As part of the mighty peacekeeping force of US seapower in that troubled area of the world, she continued to support the forces for freedom in the incessant struggle against the menace of Asian communism. After embarking Vietnamese refugees who were fleeing the tyranny and oppression of the Communist dominated north, she departed Haiphong, 18 September, and carried her passengers to Saigon, where they could begin a new life of freedom in Southeast Asia. During the next 2 months she completed six round trips between northern and southern Vietnam, while carrying refugees, French troops, and military supplies to Saigon, Tourane, and Nha Trang. She completed her duty 23 November; sailed to Japan, 30 November; and returned to Seattle, 4 to 16 December.

== Fate ==
Marine Lynx remained at Seattle, and was placed in reduced operational status from 11 May 1955 to 4 June 1956. Resuming her Far East service, she departed Seattle, 14 June 1956, and arrived Inchon, 28 June. There she embarked US peacekeeping troops and between 29 June and 15 July, carried them to San Francisco. She returned to Seattle, 16 to 18 July, and returned to reserve operational status 25 July. On 1 May 1958, she transferred permanently to the Maritime Administration and was berthed in the National Defense Reserve Fleet at Astoria, Oregon. Her name was struck from the Navy list the same day. Marine Lynx was sold to Hudson Waterways Corp., 4 August 1967, converted to a cargo ship, and renamed Transcolumbia.

From 3 October 1968 to 25 August 1985, Transcolumbia was chartered to the Military Sealift Command. In June 1988, Transcolumbia was sold for scrapping.

== Awards ==
Marine Lynx received seven battle stars for Korean service.

== Bibliography ==
Online resources

- "Marine Lynx". Dictionary of American Naval Fighting Ships. Naval History and Heritage Command. 5 August 2015.
- "Kaiser Vancouver, Vancouver WA". Shipbuilding History. 27 November 2010.
- "USS Marine Lynx (T-AP-194)". NavSource. 6 June 2014.
- "Marine Lynx (T-AP-194)". United States Department of Transportation. Archived from the original on November 3, 2016.
- "USNS Marine Lynx".
