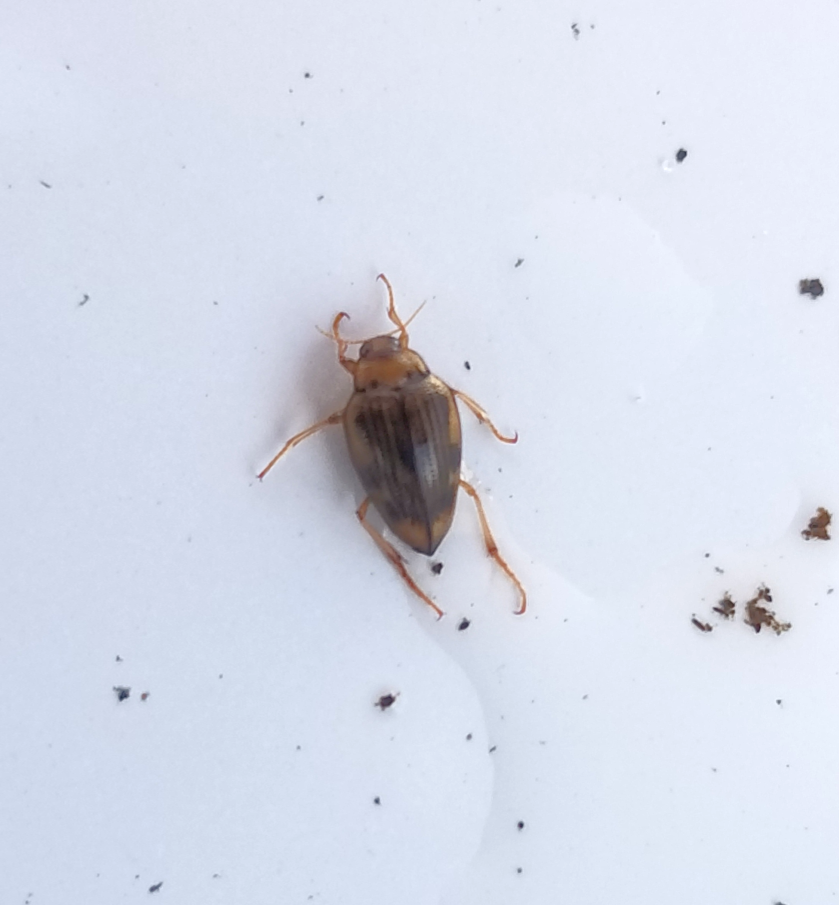

Conservation status
- Imperiled (NatureServe)

- Endangered (ESA)

Scientific classification
- Kingdom: Animalia
- Phylum: Arthropoda
- Clade: Pancrustacea
- Class: Insecta
- Order: Coleoptera
- Suborder: Adephaga
- Family: Haliplidae
- Genus: Brychius
- Species: B. hungerfordi

Binomial name
- Brychius hungerfordi Spangler, 1954

= Hungerford's crawling water beetle =

Species of beetle

Hungerford's crawling water beetle (Brychius hungerfordi) is a critically endangered member of the family Haliplidae of water beetles found in northeastern North America. The US Fish and Wildlife Service Draft Recovery Plan for the species published in September 2006 stated that at the time the beetle was only found in 7 streams and was found in small numbers in all but one stream. In 2010, a five-year summary report by the United States Fish and Wildlife Service found the population to be essentially unchanged. In June 2025 the beetle was known to occur in 16 streams range-wide: 14 streams in northern Michigan and 2 streams in Ontario, Canada.

The species was first discovered by entomologist Paul J. Spangler in 1954.

== Endangered status ==
Hungerford's crawling water beetle was categorized as endangered on March 7, 1994, effective April 6, 1994, under the provisions of the U.S. Endangered Species Act. The Hungerford's crawling water beetle is also protected as a Schedule 1 endangered species in Canada under the Species at Risk Act. At the time that the species was listed on the endangered species list, it was found in only three streams.

== Known populations ==
Known populations of Hungerford's crawling water beetles are limited to cold-water streams in only seven locations. Four of these are in Michigan and three are in Ontario.

=== Michigan locations ===
Almost all known Hungerford's crawling water beetles live in a single location: the East Branch of the Maple River in Emmet County, Michigan. This location consists of a two and a half mile stretch of the river downstream from the Douglas Road crossing. This area supports the only stable population of the Hungerford's crawling water beetle, recording nearly 1052 beetles when last counted in 2002. This area is largely within and along the boundary of the University of Michigan Biological Station.

Of the remaining sites, a second is also in Emmet County. This is near the Oliver Road crossing of the Carp Lake River, where four adult specimens were recorded in 1997, but erosion at the road seems to have harmed the habitat and no specimens were found in the last survey conducted in 2003.

In Montmorency County, Michigan, two more sites have yielded official records of Hungerford's crawling water beetles. Along the East Branch of the Black River inside the Mackinaw State Forest, two adult beetles were found in surveys in 1989, and again in 1996, two more adults were found. Still, the status of the population there remains uncertain. In July 1999, six additional adult beetles were identified elsewhere in the Mackinaw State Forest in Van Hetton Creek.

The Carp Lake River and Van Hetton Creek identifications were significant as they represented a new location beyond those originally identified when the Hungerford's crawling water beetle was categorized as endangered in 1994. This suggests that the rare beetle may occur in other sites as yet undiscovered.

=== Ontario locations ===
Populations of Hungerford's crawling water beetles in Canada inhabit the North Saugeen River near Scone in Bruce County, Ontario, the Rankin River and the Saugeen River mainstem. In 1986, 42 beetles were identified at a site downstream from a dam on the North Saugeen. An unspecified number of beetles was last recorded in 2001, but surveys in 2002 and 2008 uncovered no specimens. As a result, the status of this population of Hungerford's crawling water beetles in the North Saugeen is uncertain at present [when?].

== Habitat ==
It is believed that the Hungerford's crawling water beetle requires cool (15–25 °C or 59–77 °F), swift flowing alkaline streams with sand and gravel bottoms. While in their larval stage, the beetles gather in concentrations of microalgae and in slower moving waters. The beetles are thought to favor beaver dams and anthropogenic structures, such as culverts and dams. The larvae may specialize in feeding on Dichotomosiphon tuberosus, a type of green algae.

== Description ==
Like all Haliplidae the adult form of the Hungerford's crawling water beetle is more or less ovoid, with a markedly convex upperside. They have a yellowish-brown color with irregular dark markings. They are extremely small (3.8–4.3 millimetres or 0.15–0.17 inches long) which may contribute to the difficulty in locating them. Their wing covers are characterized by perforated stripes. The sides of their dorsal plate behind the head are nearly parallel for the basal two-thirds before widening at the sides.

As characteristic of all Haliplidae, the hindlegs of Hungerford's crawling water beetles have very distinctive and comparatively large coxal plates that cover most of the beetle's abdominal underside as well as parts of its hindlegs. These hindleg plates do not move although they are not fused to the beetle's centerline. As with all Haliplidae, these specialized hindleg plates function as air storage devices supplementing the air carried under the wing covers.

Although most other Haliplidae are capable of flight, only one observation of a flying Hungerford's crawling water beetle has been made. It is not certain how far adults fly or what triggers them to initiate flight.

The larvae of this beetle can be identified by the presence of a curved urogomphus on the last segment of the abdomen.
