= Krapp =

Krapp is a surname. Notable people with the surname include:

- Edgar Krapp (born 1947), German organist
- Gene Krapp (1887–1923), American baseball player
- George Philip Krapp (1872–1934), American academic
- Herbert J. Krapp (1887–1973), American theatre architect and designer

== See also ==
- Krapp's Last Tape, a play by Samuel Beckett
- Krapp, ou, La dernière bande, a chamber opera by Marcel Mihalovici adapted from Krapp's Last Tape
- Crap (disambiguation)
