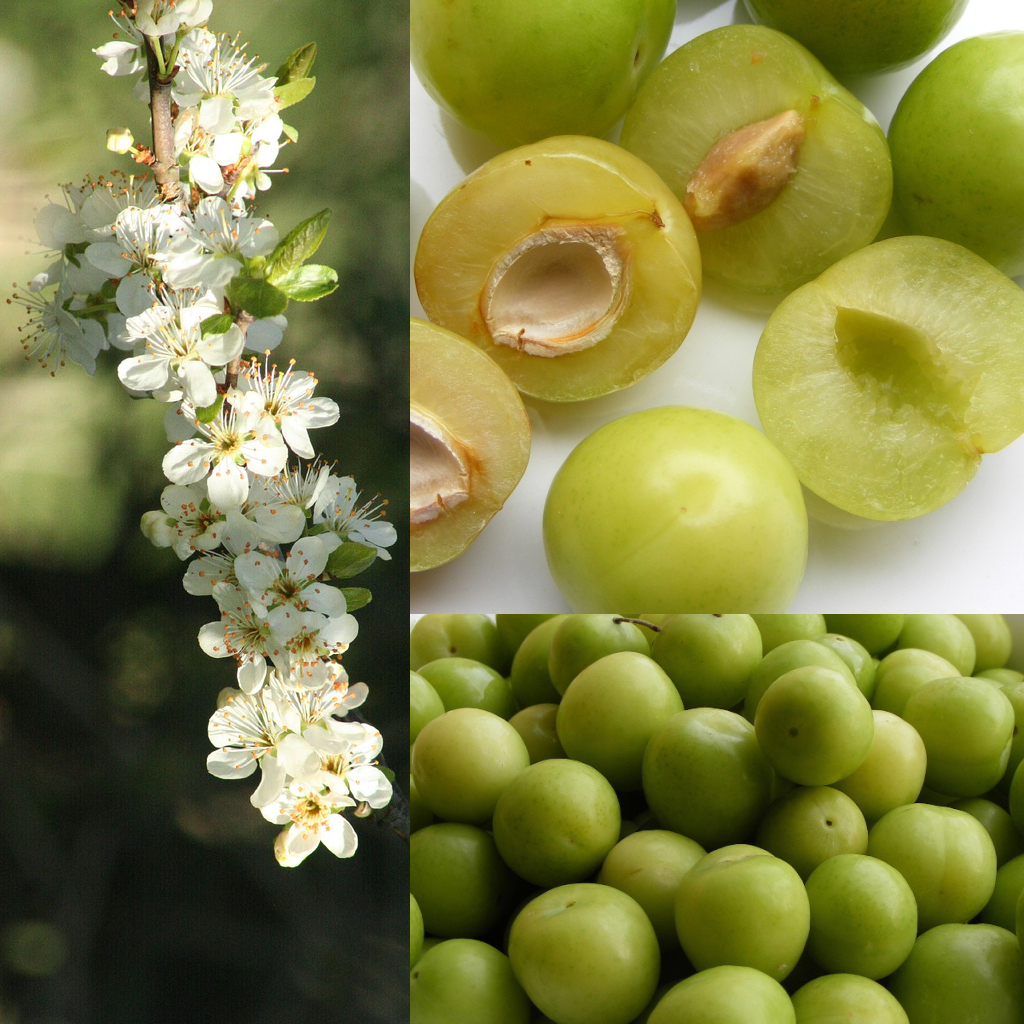

Scientific classification
- Kingdom: Plantae
- Clade: Tracheophytes
- Clade: Angiosperms
- Clade: Eudicots
- Clade: Rosids
- Order: Rosales
- Family: Rosaceae
- Genus: Prunus
- Species: P. domestica
- Subspecies: P. d. subsp. italica

Trinomial name
- Prunus domestica subsp. italica (Borkh.) Gams ex Hegi

Synonyms
- Prunus italica Borkh.

= Greengage =

Group of fruit cultivars

The greengages are a group of cultivars of the common Middle Eastern plum. Greengages are grown in temperate areas and are known for the rich, confectionery flavour. They are considered to be among the finest dessert plums though they are also consumed unripe when they are pleasantly tart, hard and crunchy.

== Description ==
Greengage fruit are identified by their round-oval shape and smooth-textured, pale green flesh; they are on average smaller than round plums but larger than mirabelle plums—usually between 2 and 4 centimetres (1 and 1 1/2 in) diameter. The skin ranges in colour from green to yellowish, with a pale blue "blush" in some cultivars; a few Reine Claudes, such as 'Graf Althanns', are reddish-purple due to crossbreeding with other plums.

== Taxonomy ==
Greengage fruit originated in the Middle East. Though "Green Gages" were previously thought to have been first imported into England from France in 1724 by Sir William Gage, 7th Baronet, a greengage seed was found embedded in a 15th-century building in Hereford. Supposedly, the labels identifying the French plum trees were lost in transit to Gage's home at Hengrave Hall, near Bury St Edmunds. More recent research indicates that it was a cousin and namesake Sir William Gage, 2nd Baronet of Hengrave who was responsible for introducing the greengage to England.

The name Reine Claude (French for "Queen Claude"), by which they are known in France, is in honour of the French queen Claude (1499–1524), Duchess of Brittany. A greengage is also called la bonne reine (French for "the good Queen") in France.

Although the Oxford English Dictionary regards "gage" and "greengage" as synonyms, not all gages are green, and some horticulturists make a distinction between the two words, with greengages as a variety of the gages, as Prunus domestica subsp. italica var. claudiana.

== Cultivation ==
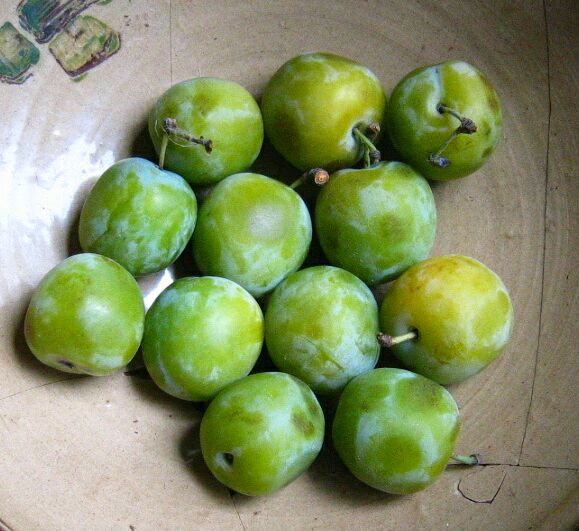
Freshly harvested Reine Claude Verte

In the Czech Republic, they are known as ringle, in Poland as renklody, in Hungary as ringló, in Slovakia as ringloty, in Slovenia as ringlo, and in Portugal as Rainha Cláudia. They are widely grown, typically for eating out of hand or stewing in syrup to make a compote. In Portugal, however, they make up a delicacy invented by Dominican nuns in the 16th or 17th century (when confined to their convents) in the town of Elvas, where they are boiled in a sugary syrup several times, over the course of several weeks, to then be preserved whole in syrup or dried, coated in sugar and eaten either with a local dessert, sericaia, made from eggs, sugar, milk, cinnamon and flour or eaten with rich cheeses.

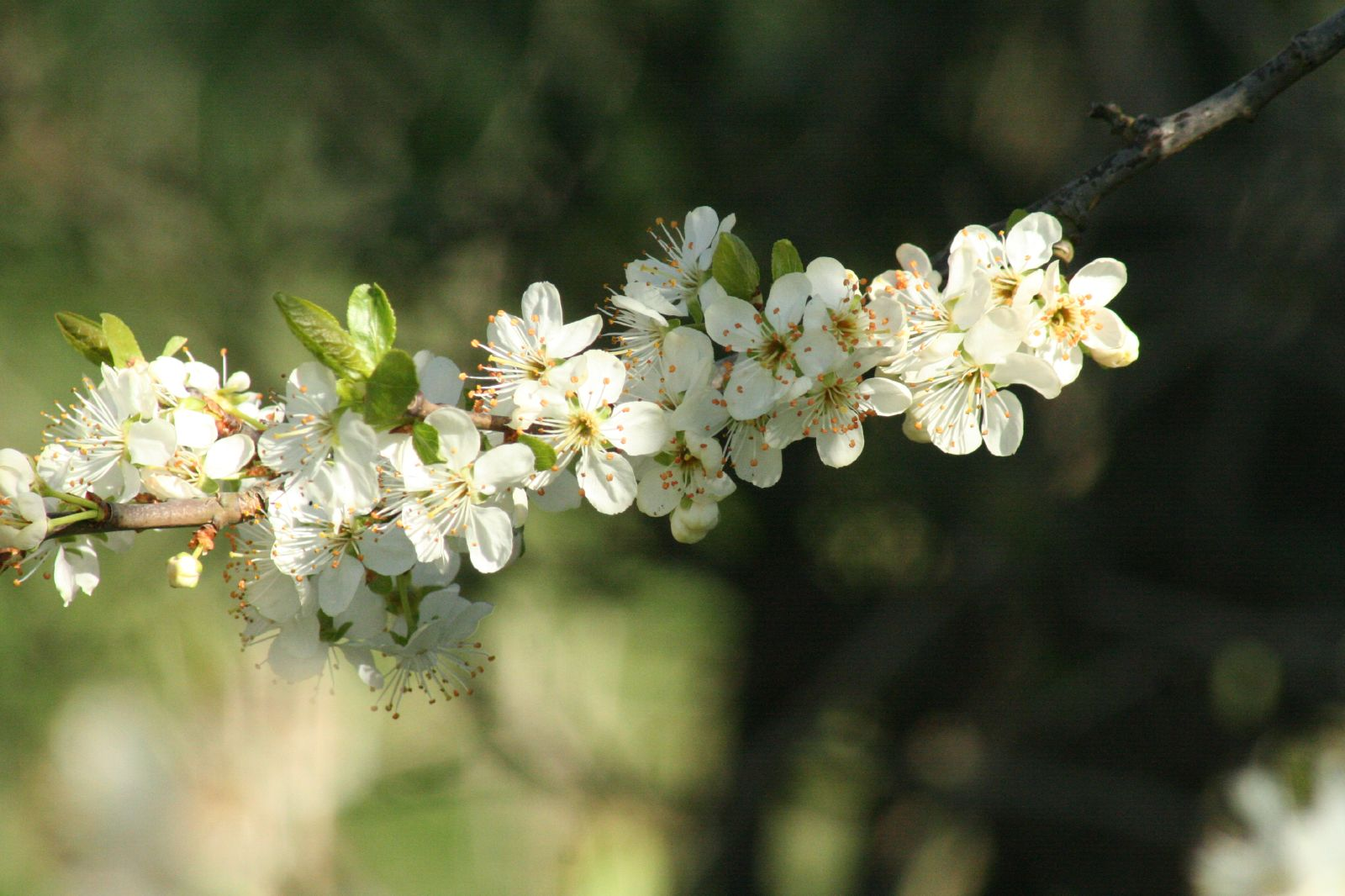
Flowers of P. domestica subsp. italica

The green cultivars are bred more or less true from seed. Several similar cultivars produced from seedlings are now available; some of these include other plum cultivars in their parentage. Widely grown cultivars include:

- Canerik (Turkey)
- Boddarts Reneclode (Germany)
- Bryanston (UK)
- Cambridge Gage (UK)
- Denniston's Superb (US)
- Yaşıl Alça or Göy Alça (Azerbaijan)
- Golden Transparent (UK)
- Graf Althanns Reneklode (Germany)
- Green Vanilla (Mount Pelion, Greece)
- Große Grüne Reneklode (Germany) / Reine Claude Verte (France)
- Laxton's Gage (UK)
- Laxton's Supreme (UK)
- Meroldts Reneclode (Germany)
- Rainha Cláudia (Portugal)
- Regina Claudia (Italy)
- Reine Claude de Bavay (France)
- Reine Claude d'Oullins (France)
- Uhinks Reneklode (Germany)
- Washington (US)

== Uses ==
They are considered to be among the finest dessert plums. Anna Pavord calls them the "most ambrosial of all tree fruit", and David Karp described them as "the best fruit in the world". A greengage jam can be spread on toast, used in jam tarts or eaten with scones.

== In culture ==
Greengages were cultivated in the American colonies, being grown on the plantations of American presidents George Washington (1732–1799) and Thomas Jefferson (1743–1826).

The fruit is referenced in the British novel The Greengage Summer (1958) by Rumer Godden, which was adapted into a film in 1961.

Greengages are mentioned in a Monty Python's Flying Circus sketch as a form of dangerous fruit (as in a food fight).

More recently, the tree features in the novel The Enlightenment of the Greengage Tree (2017) by Iranian-Australian author Shokoofeh Azar.
