= Korean Association of Retired Persons =

Korean American non-profit

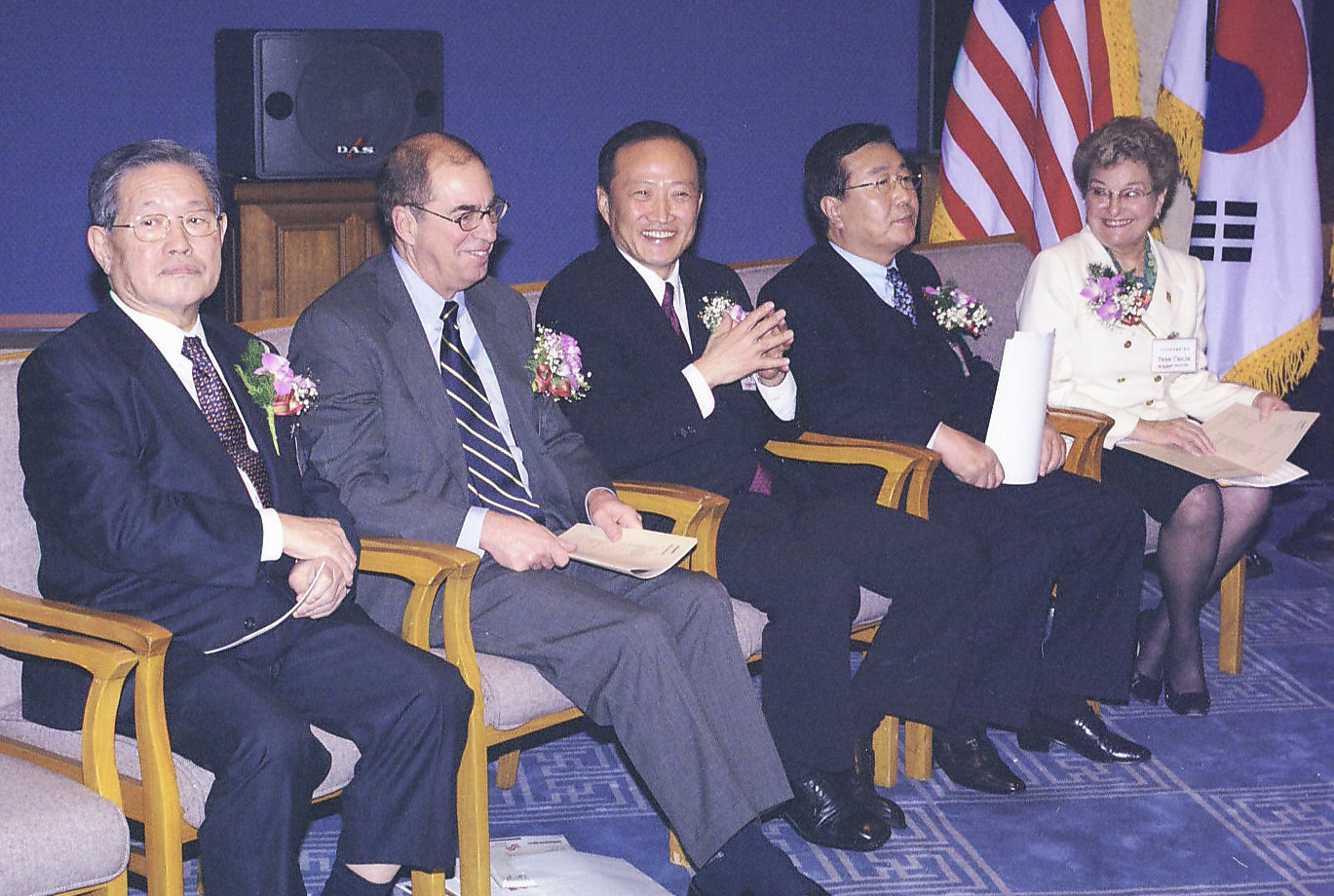
KARP Inauguration ceremony, Seoul press center Jan. 15, 2002

The Korean Association of Retired Persons (KARP; Korean: 대한은퇴자협회) is an international, not-for-profit, non-governmental organization affiliated with the United Nations. The organization focuses on serving the interests and needs of Koreans ages 50+. It was founded in 1996 in New York City.
