= Lila Karp =

American author, teacher, activist, and psychotherapist (1933–2008)

- Born: June 7, 1933
- Died: September 15, 2008 (aged 75)
- Education: Antioch University
- Occupations: Author; teacher; activist; psychoterapist
- Notable work: The Queen Is in the Garbage (1969)

Lila Karp (June 7, 1933 – September 15, 2008) was an American feminist author, teacher, activist, and psychotherapist. She is best known for her 1969 novel The Queen Is in the Garbage and is profiled in the book Feminists Who Changed America, 1963-1975. Karp spent a decade living in London, where she wrote The Queen Is in the Garbage, before moving to New York City in the late 1960s.

She was among the second-wave feminists in New York in the 1960s and was a member of The Feminists. This group included such notables as Kate Millett, Flo Kennedy, Ti-Grace Atkinson, and Margo Jefferson. Karp was featured in the 1977 documentary, Some American Feminists.

Karp helped pioneer the field of Women's Studies at Princeton University, where she served as the director of the University Women's Center. She delivered a paper on the subject entitled "Women's Studies: Fear and Loathing in the Ivy League" at the National Women's Studies Association Meeting in 1979. She was appointed the co-director of The Institute for the Study of Women and Men at the University of Southern California in 1991.

== Sources ==
- Karp, Lila. The Queen is in the Garbage, Feminist Press at CUNY, 2007; ISBN 1558615385
- Love, Barbara J. Feminists Who Changed America, 1963-1975. University of Illinois Press, 2006; ISBN 025203189X
