= Crapo =

Crapo may refer to:

== People with the surname ==
- Henry H. Crapo (1804–1869), American politician from Michigan
- Henry Crapo (mathematician) (1932–2019), American-Canadian mathematician
- Mike Crapo (born 1951), American politician from Idaho
- Terry Crapo (1939–1982), American politician, brother of Mike
- William W. Crapo (1830–1926), American politician, from Massachusetts
- William Crapo Durant (1861–1947), American businessman, founder of General Motors

== Places ==
- Crapo Park, a city park in Burlington, Iowa, US
- Crapo, Maryland, an unincorporated community, US

== See also ==
- Crépeau (disambiguation)
