= Gail Karp =

American cantor

Cantor Gail Karp
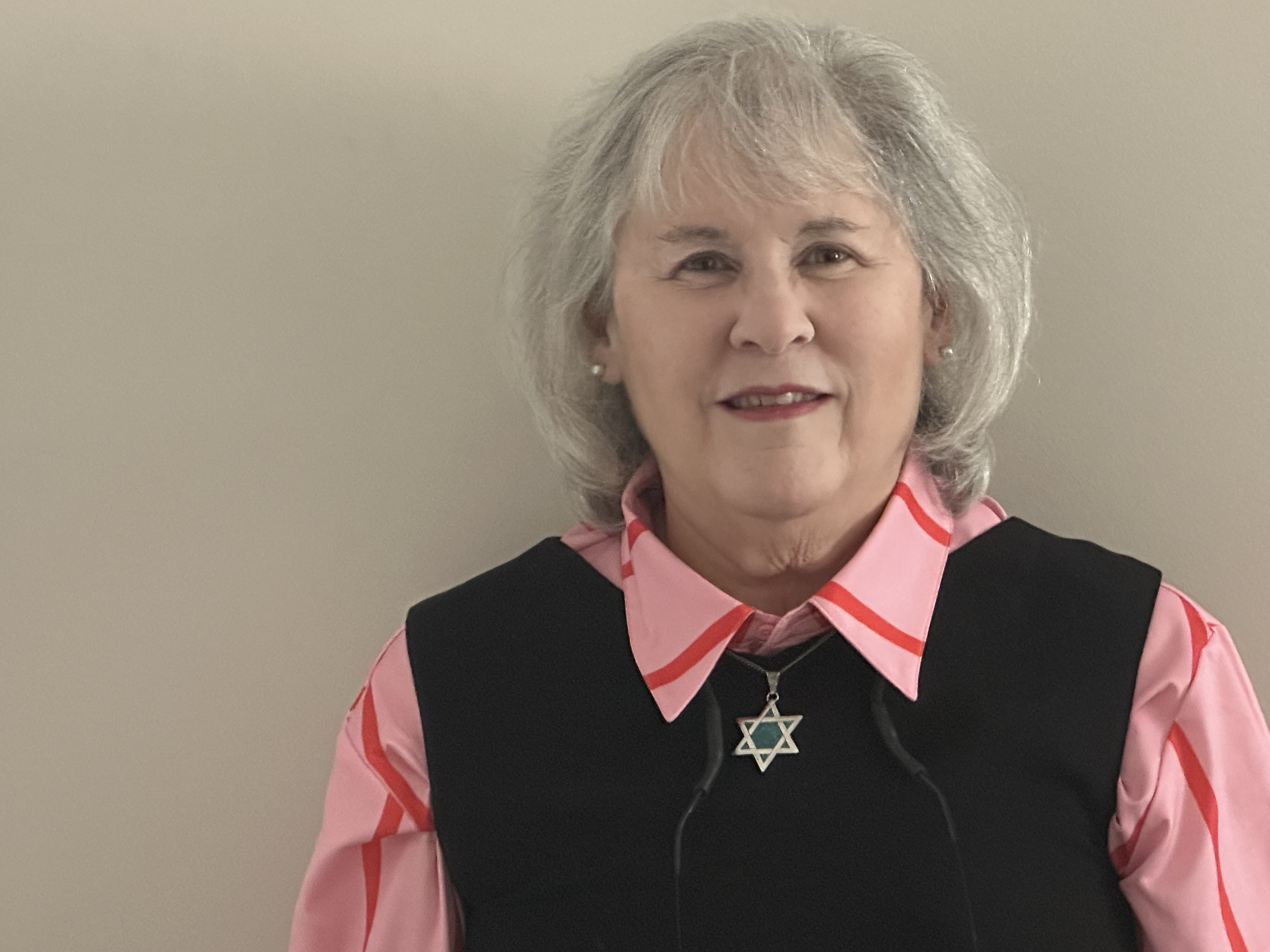
- Education: Interlochen Center for the Arts; University of Michigan; Hebrew Union College, Jewish Institute of Religion; Iowa Peace Institute & BBB Certified Mediator, Department of Defense Certified Logistician and Finance Management Analyst.
- Alma mater: University of Nebraska–Lincoln
- Occupations: Reform Jewish Clergy (Emerita; Temple Emanuel of Davenport) and the Department of Defense

Gail Ilene Posner Karp (born in the mid 1950s in Detroit, Michigan) served as the cantor of the Reform Jewish synagogue Temple Emanuel in Davenport, Iowa, US from 1987 to 2016. She is employed by the Department of Defense.

== Early life and education ==
Karp attended the Hebrew Union College - Jewish Institute of Religion, Debbie Friedman School of Sacred Music in New York City (HUC-JIR), where she was ordained as the fourth female Jewish cantor in 1978, and subsequently achieved a master's degree in voice performance and musicology from the University of Nebraska–Lincoln in 1980. She became a member of the professional women's music fraternity Sigma Alpha Iota while a student.

== Early career ==
While in seminary, Gail Posner Karp served Temple Beth Torah on Long Island as their first cantor in the late 70’s. In the years that followed she was affiliated with Temple Israel of Omaha and Congregation B'nai Jeshurun of Lincoln in Nebraska, Temple Beth El of Aptos and Temple Emanuel of San Jose. She was the first credentialed, licensed cantor to serve these congregations.

== Advocacy ==
In 1986, the Karp's middle child, Joshua, was diagnosed with autism at the University of Iowa Hospitals and Clinics, Division of Child Psychiatry. The diagnosis led to a second career that included local, state and national leadership roles with the Autism Societies of the Quad Cities, state of Iowa and nationally from the mid-1980s until the turn of the century. During this time, Gail Karp was also appointed to the Iowa Governor's Task Force on Autism, worked on the establishment of the Autism Tissue Program, and consulted with numerous other funded special projects of regional and national significance (SPRANS grant programs) that impacted the lives of persons with disabilities. Cantor Karp has served on the editorial boards of The Journal of Information and Referral Services, The Advocate (a quarterly publication of the Autism Society of America), and the Iowa COMPASS. In 2003, she received an honorary doctorate from the Hebrew Union College, citing her work on behalf of this special population.

== Private life ==
Karp is married to Rabbi Henry Karp, rabbi emeritus of Temple Emanuel in Davenport. They have three children. According to Henry Karp, he and Gail Posner Karp were the first Rabbi-Cantor clergy couple to become engaged and married during their seminary studies at HUC (1973–1978).

== Fund development ==
Shortly after the initial diagnosis of her son, Karp started attempting to improve the quality of life for all persons with autism (and, as time progressed, persons who experience disabilities with both related and disparate diagnoses). She entered the fundraising profession, and qualified as a Certified Fundraising Professional (CFRE) in 2000, and for a Grant Professional Credential (GPC).

Other professional memberships included The Partnership for Philanthropic Planning (formerly the National Committee for Planned Giving, where she served as a local council past president) and the American Conference of Cantors (as a past board member and a member of committees).

== Publications and writings ==
- The Aleynu: A Missinai Melody as sung by the Jews of Blois, France], University of Nebraska–Lincoln, (1980)
- The Evolution of the Aleynu, 1171 to the present], Journal of Synagogue Music 12, no. 1 (1982): 3-23
- Muslim-Jewish Dialogue Activity Guide
- Devar Torah

== Other activities ==
- Interfaith Education Forum on Human Trafficking
- Detroit Arsenal Holocaust Observance
- Lehrhaus Judaica Instructor, Stanford University
- Interfaith Peace Rally

== Sources ==
- Quad City Times Retirement Tribute May 30, 2017
- Quad City Times Tribute and Biography May 30, 2017
- Jewish Post, Indianapolis, Marion County, 12 June 1985
- The Lincoln Star, Lincoln, Nebraska 6 November, 1977
- Jerusalem Post, 4 April 2019
