= USNS Marine Carp =

History

United States
- Name: Marine Carp
- Operator: Matson Navigation Co.
- Ordered: as a Type C4-S-A3 hull, MCE hull 2362
- Builder: Kaiser Shipbuilding Company, Vancouver, Washington
- Cost: $8,000,000
- Yard number: 509
- Way number: 12
- Laid down: 6 December 1944
- Launched: 5 July 1945
- Sponsored by: Mrs. Elizabeth Nyberg
- Acquired: 11 October 1945
- Fate: Turned over to American Export Lines, 22 August 1946

United States
- Name: Marine Carp
- Operator: American Export Lines
- In service: 22 August 1946
- Out of service: 23 May 1949
- Fate: Laid up in the National Defense Reserve Fleet, James River Group, Lee Hall, Virginia, 23 May 1949; Transferred to National Defense Reserve Fleet, Hudson River Group, 31 August 1951; Transferred to US Navy, 17 March 1952

United States
- Name: Marine Carp
- Namesake: A merchant name retained
- Operator: Military Sea Transportation Service (MSTS)
- In service: 15 September 1952
- Out of service: 9 October 1957
- Stricken: 11 September 1958
- Identification: Hull symbol: T-AP-199; Code letters: NEBP
- Fate: Laid up in the National Defense Reserve Fleet, Beaumont Texas Group, 11 September 1958; Sold for commercial operations, 20 July 1967

United States
- Name: Green Springs
- Operator: Central Gulf Steamship Corp
- In service: 20 July 1967
- Out of service: 13 July 1979
- Identification: IMO number: 5224754
- Fate: Sold for scrapping, 13 July 1979

General characteristics
- Class & type: Marine Adder-class transport
- Type: Type C4-S-A3
- Displacement: 6,720 long tons (6,830 t) (light load); 10,210 long tons (10,370 t) (full load)
- Length: 523 ft (159 m)
- Beam: 72 ft (22 m)
- Draft: 26 ft (7.9 m)
- Installed power: 13,750 shp (10,250 kW)
- Propulsion: 1 × Steam turbine; 1 x propeller
- Speed: 18 kn (33 km/h; 21 mph)
- Capacity: 53,000 cu ft (1,500 m^{3})
- Troops: 3,451

Service record
- Operations: Korean Summer-Fall 1953 (6–10 July 1953)
- Awards: American Campaign Medal; Asiatic–Pacific Campaign Medal; World War II Victory Medal; National Defense Service Medal; Korean Service Medal; United Nations Service Medal; Republic of Korea War Service Medal

USNS Marine Carp (T-AP-199) was a Marine Adder-class transport that saw service with the US Navy for the task of transporting troops to and from combat areas. She was of the C4-S-A3 design type.

== Construction ==
Marine Carp, approved 18 April 1944, was laid down by Kaiser Shipbuilding Co., Vancouver, Washington, 6 December 1944, as MC Hull no. 2362; launched 5 July 1945; sponsored by Mrs. Elizabeth Nyberg; and delivered to her operator, Matson Navigation Co., 11 October 1945.

== Service history ==
Marine Carp departed the west coast 14 November 1945, and steamed to the Philippines to embark Pacific war veterans for return to the United States. She returned to Los Angeles, from Manila, just before Christmas, thence sailed on a trooplift run from the Mediterranean late in January 1946. Steaming via the Panama Canal, she embarked troops at Naples, Italy, and Le Havre, France, in February, and steamed back to the United States arriving New York, early in March. After completing another trip to the Mediterranean and back in the spring of 1946, she entered the Maritime Commission National Defense Reserve Fleet.

Between 1947 and 1952, she was berthed in the Hudson River Group. Acquired by the Navy 17 March 1952, Marine Carp steamed to Baltimore, Maryland, 1 April; was placed in service there 15 September 1952; and assigned to duty under Military Sea Transportation Service (MSTS).

Crewed by the civil service, Marine Carp steamed to New York, 16 to 18 September, to prepare for transatlantic duty. She departed New York, 27 September, and made a round trip run to La Pallice, France, and Bremerhaven, West Germany, returning to the United States, 21 October. Between 28 October and 15 February 1953, she completed three more voyages to European ports and back; thence, she sailed for the Far East 28 May.

Steaming via Puerto Rico and the Panama Canal, Marine Carp reached Sasebo, Japan, 30 June. A week later she embarked homeward bound US troops at Inchon, South Korea, and on 9 July, she sailed for the United States. She touched at Hawaii 19 July; transited the Panama Canal; and reached New York, 10 August. She went into reduced operational status 4 September.

Marine Carp resumed operations 20 July 1954, and sailed 15 September, to carry out supply and replenishment operations in Davis Strait and Baffin Bay. She steamed to Frobisher Bay, Baffin Island, and to Thule, Greenland, thence returned via Norfolk, Virginia, to New York, 10 October. Between 15 October and 21 November, she carried out a second Arctic run, and on 25 November, she returned to reduced operational status.

Departing New York, 18 February 1955, Marine Carp resumed transatlantic service to Bremerhaven and back. She returned to New York from her third round trip 6 May, and on 23 May, sailed for additional duty off Greenland. During the next 2 months she made two runs to Goose Bay, Labrador, and to Thule and Sondrestrom, Greenland; and, after returning to New York, 18 July, she resumed reduced operational status until May 1956. From 21 May to 22 July 1956, she undertook two more support runs to Greenland before returning to reduced status at New York.

Following the Hungarian Revolution in late October 1956, Marine Carp departed New York 18 December, for Bremerhaven, where she arrived 28 December, to embark Hungarian refugees traveling to the United States.

== Fate ==
She returned to New York 16 January 1957; served in reduced status until 20 May; thence sailed 21 May, to resume support duty along the Greenland coast. After returning to New York, 1 July, she steamed to Orange, Texas, 23 to 30 September, and was inactivated 9 October. She transferred permanently to the Maritime Administration (MARAD) 11 September 1958, and entered the National Defense Reserve Fleet at Beaumont, Texas. Her name was struck from the Navy list 11 September. Marine Carp was sold 20 July 1967, to Central Gulf Steamship Corp., converted to a general cargo ship and renamed Green Springs.

On 13 July 1979, Green Springs was sold to Chin Ho Fa Steel & Iron from scrapping.

== Bibliography ==
Online resources

- "Marine Carp". Dictionary of American Naval Fighting Ships. Naval History and Heritage Command. 5 August 2015. This article incorporates text from this source, which is in the public domain.
- "Kaiser Vancouver, Vancouver WA". www.ShipbuildingHistory.com. 27 November 2010.
- "USS Marine Carp (T-AP-199)". NavSource. 22 June 2007.
- "Marine Carp (T-AP-199)". United States Department of Transportation. Archived from the original on November 3, 2016.
- "USNS Marine Carp".
