= Cultural Assets Rehabilitation Project =

The Cultural Assets Rehabilitation Project (or CARP) was created by the Government of Eritrea to assess the architectural heritage of the capital, Asmara. This project is operated by the Cultural Heritage Steering Committee which is composed of officials from two municipalities and various government agencies.

CARP also hopes to add a Historical District to Asmara and to have it added to the list of UNESCO World Heritage Sites. More than 400 buildings in Asmara have been identified as part of this project and CARP is responsible for overseeing their renovation. Unfortunately, the funds for the project, especially those meant for the renovation of Cinema Capitol and Theatro Asmara, about US$2.5million were returned, after The Government of Eritrea, decided to halt the activities of the project. Rumors say that the main cause of the decision is the rivalry between the Minister of Finance, who is ailing sick in England now, and the Minister of National Development, the intelligent Dr. Woldai Fitur. The project witnessed many changes during its lifetime before it was suddenly stopped. Three Project Coordinators were nominated. The first two had to suddenly leave the country; namely Dr. Naigzy Ghebremedhin, the brain behind the project, left the project after the Government accused him of taking all the credit for the work, contrary to the idea that all the concepts in the project are his and his alone. The people at the president's office were his main rivals for they could not stand the sparkling work that he produced, especially the book about Asmara (up to now the book did not get any recognition in the Eritrean media, but it got on the front page of the New York Times). The person who replaced him, Urban Planner Gabriel Tsegai, faced the same fate, after he tried to give life to the projects when Dr. Naigzy G/medhin suddenly run away from Eritrea, was similarly sought after by the Internal Security People, for similar accusations. He made a pretext and then left the country too. The project was given to an accountant, who had no option but to say yes to what the fighting Ministers ordered him to do. CARP had a steering committee, which was supposed to give management support to the Project Coordinator. However, this committee had too many disagreements among themselves that it became a reason for freezing some of the activities. Especially the fight between Dr.Naigzy Gebremedhin—an architect by training—and Dr. Yosief Libseqal is worth noting. Maybe the highly technical skills of Dr. Naigzy are not accompanied by leadership skills. That failed project is taken up by the European Union having similar results. The European Union is said to have great interest to maintain Theatro Asmara.

بريحا
