= David Karp (pomologist) =

American pomologist

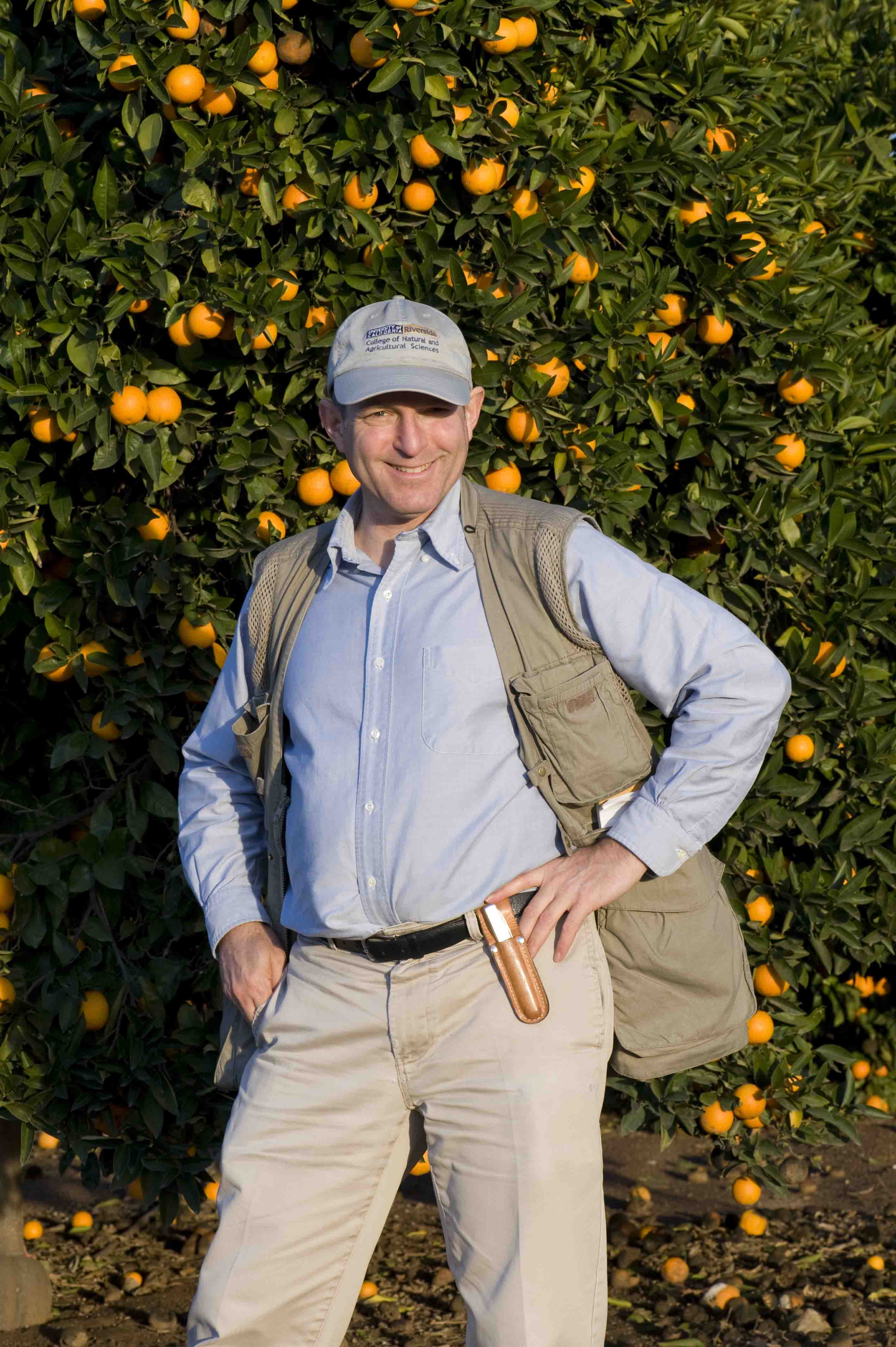
- David Karp in front of an orange tree at the Citrus Variety Collection of the University of California, Riverside.
- Born: David Karp; 1958 (age 67–68); Los Angeles
- Education: Graduated from Wesleyan University, Middletown, Connecticut, in 1979 with a B.A. in Late Antique Studies, magna cum laude, Phi Beta Kappa.
- Known for: Pomologist, writer
- Title: Department of Botany and Plant Sciences, at the University of California, Riverside.

David Karp (born 1958) is an active pomologist, traveler and writer, who calls himself a Fruit detective.

== Life ==
David is the son of Harvey Karp, a businessman, whose East Hampton home was reputed to be a palace. He was fluent in Latin when he graduated from high school. At 20, while majoring in medieval art studies at Wesleyan University, he published a translation of the 6th-century Latin author Venantius Fortunatus.

After graduation, he started a career in risk arbitrage and option trading on Wall Street, has worked for gourmet specialty store Citarella and acted as a provisioner for Dean & DeLuca. After recovering from a serious drug addiction, he changed course and began a new career as a freelance fruit writer.

Karp moved to California in 1999.

== Writings ==
Karp's photographs and writings appear in his weekly column, Market Watch, at the Los Angeles Times, and he has written articles for The New York Times, The Wall Street Journal, Gourmet, Smithsonian, Sunset, Star-Ledger and Saveur publications. He has been a guest on the Saturday morning food show on radio station KCRW.

When the threat of citrus greening first appeared in the U.S., Karp wrote in the New York Times to alert the public of the disease's risks.

== Projects ==
=== Citrus Documentation at CVC ===
Karp is an associate in the Agricultural Experiment Station at the University of California, Riverside, working to photograph and document the more than 1,000 varieties grown at the Citrus Variety Collection of the University of California. Displayed on the CVC website, these photos are accessible to researchers throughout the world.

=== Citrus germplasm in China ===
He helped co-found the Chinese Citrus Germplasm Repository in Jiangshui (about 50 miles from Kunming), province of Yunnan.

=== Bunyard Orchard ===
David Karp and Andy Mariani are co-founders of the Bunyard Orchard of heirloom stone fruit in Morgan Hill, California.

=== Unforbidden Fruit ===
Karp became involved as a researcher in a joint project between the University of California, Riverside and the USDA to prevent smuggling of fruit into California that may harbor insects that could threaten the state's fruit industry. The project—Unforbidden Fruits: Preventing Citrus Smuggling by Introducing Varieties Culturally Significant to Ethnic Communities—focuses on making disease-free germplasm of citrus and non-citrus fruit available to Californian nurseries and tree farmers, to replace the illicit demand.

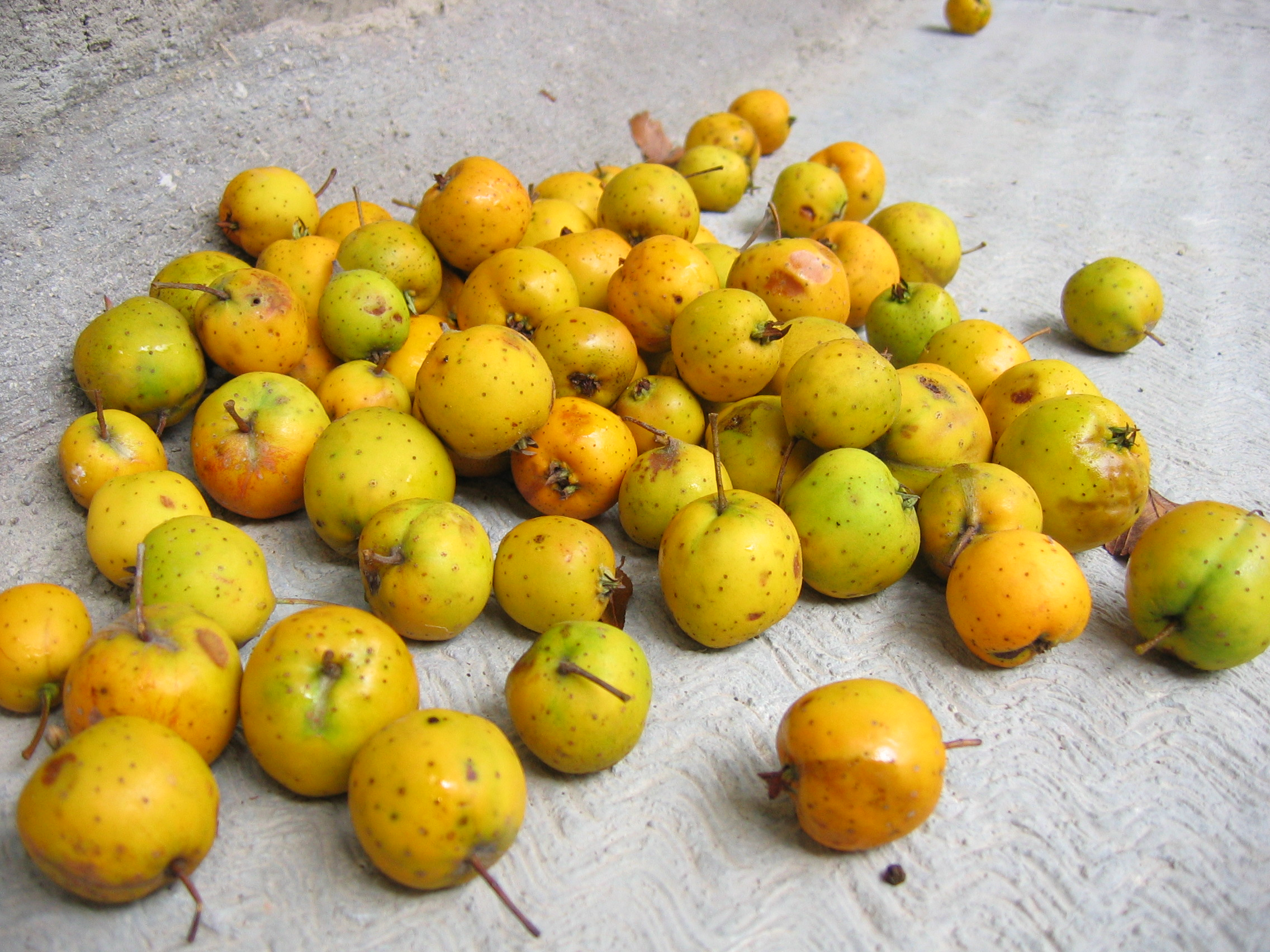
Tejocote

A non-citrus fruit that the project has targeted is "tejocote" (Crataegus mexicana, sometimes called Crataegus pubescens), a fruit that is grown in the highlands of Mexico. Because it was not being grown in the U.S., it was often smuggled into the country and sold to Mexicans who wanted to use it to serve the traditional fruit drink called ponche at Christmastime. Now that tejocote is being grown legally in California, much of the smuggling into the country has dropped off.

=== RosBREED ===
Karp is a member of the "extension advisory panel" for RosBREED, an organization dedicated to improving rosaceae crops through marker assisted crossbreeding.

== Fruits of interest ==
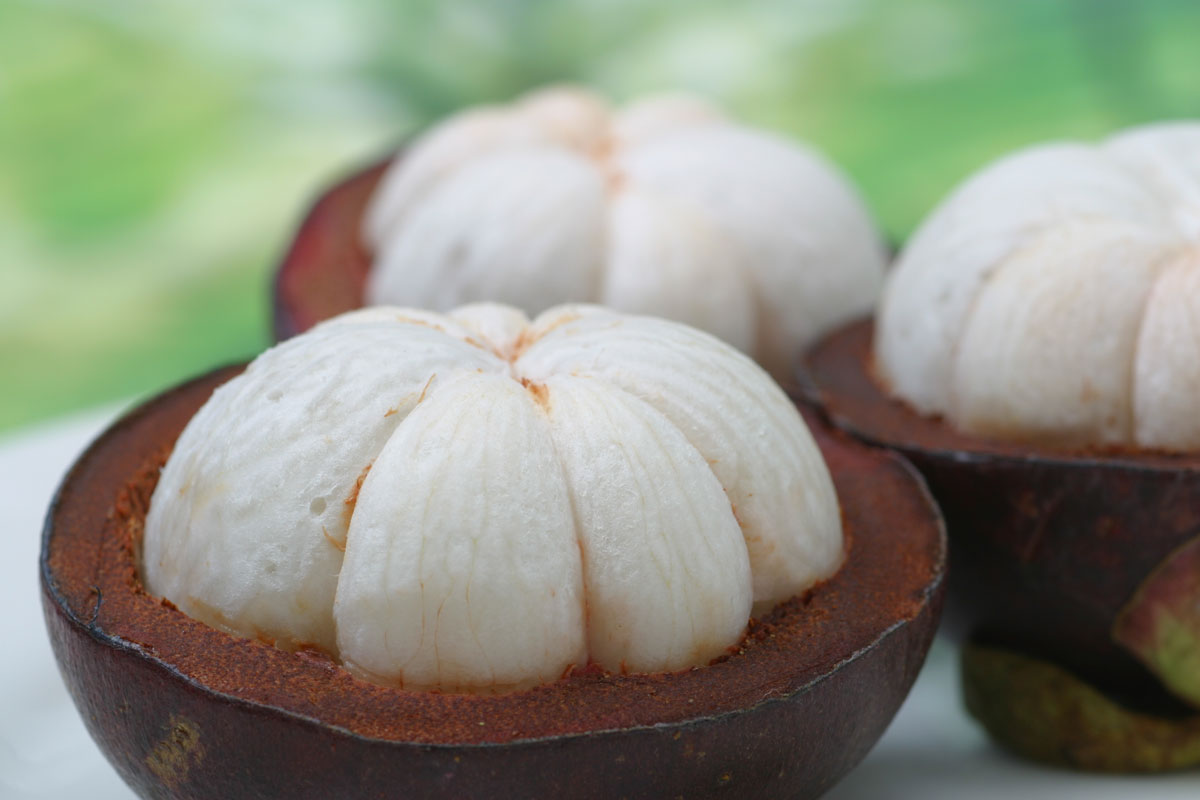
Mangosteen

=== Mangosteen ===
Karp has written several articles on the availability of the mangosteen in the United States, due to fears they harbor the Asian fruit fly. He wrote articles in the New York Times announcing the renewed U.S. law on July 23, 2007, when irradiated imports from Thailand were allowed upon USDA approval, and one following its trade at the local markets.

=== Greengage plum ===
David believes the greengage plum is the most delicious fruit on the world, and traveled to Moissac, France (its primary center of cultivation), to investigate it.
