= David A. Karp =

- Education: Harvard University
- Occupation: Professor of Sociology
- Employer: Boston College
- Website: www2.bc.edu/~karp

David Allen Karp (born 1944) is a professor of sociology at Boston College where he has taught since 1971. He received his B.A. degree from Harvard University in 1966 and his Ph.D. in Sociology from New York University in 1971. He has written or co-authored nine books and more than fifty journal articles and book chapters. His work appears in such periodicals as Symbolic Interaction, Journal of Contemporary Ethnography, Journal of Qualitative Health Research, the Gerontologist, and the International Journal of Aging and Human Development. His work has largely clustered in three areas: urban life and culture, aging, and the study of mental health and illness.

Professor Karp's body of research is both motivated by and aims to advance “symbolic interaction theory,” a sociological interpretation of social psychology. His writings highlight the “social constructionist” question, “How do people make sense of complicated life circumstances and how are their behaviors, emotions, and attitudes linked to such interpretive processes?”

Over the course of more than 40 years he has explored a variety of topics. His doctoral dissertation on the nature of “urban anonymity” involved participant observation in New York's Times Square area. This initial interest in the social psychology of city life led to the publication of his co-authored and widely respected book entitled Being Urban: A Sociology of City Life. As an assistant professor at Boston College he also co-authored a book on the “sociology of everyday life.” Always using his sociology to reflect on issues of personal significance, Professor Karp later collaborated on Experiencing the Life Cycle: A Social Psychology of Aging. This book challenged deterministic notions of a universal aging process.

In the early 1980s Professor Karp wrote a series of path-breaking papers on the social and emotional lives of people in their fifties, at that point a neglected moment in the life course. Among the several articles produced from this study, the most provocative and widely acclaimed was his paper entitled “A Decade of Reminders.” This article (featured in the science section of The New York Times) argues that there is an internal quickening of one's feelings of growing older in the fifties as those in that decade experience a momentum of social reminders about age (Karp calls them body reminders, generational reminders, contextual reminders, and mortality reminders). The paper is a model for those who wish to understand the intersection of global social factors, the immediate life circumstances of individuals, and how people construct personal identities.

Like many of his journal articles, his classic study with William C. Yoels entitled “The College Classroom: Some Observations on the Nature of Student Participation” has been reprinted multiple times. In addition, he has co-authored a series of articles on what happens in upper-middle-class families during the year that a child applies to college. However, for nearly two decades his abiding interest has been to decipher the experiences of mental illness.

Professor Karp began his series of books and articles on mental illness in the late 1980s. His exceedingly influential book entitled Speaking of Sadness: Depression, Disconnection, and the Meanings of Illness (Oxford, 1996) is the first in a series of three books on the subject. This book reveals Karp's status as a methodological craftsperson who artfully combines in-depth interviewing, personal experience, and cogent analysis. This book was very positively reviewed in The New York Times and won the Society for the Study of Symbolic Interaction's Charles Horton Cooley Award in 1996. Speaking of Sadness enjoys a wide public audience and is frequently used in basic sociology courses, courses on social psychology, and courses on health and illness, among others.

Professor Karp's second book on mental illness was published in 2000. The Burden of Sympathy: How Families Cope with Mental Illness (Oxford, 2000) is a book that makes a sizable contribution to the study of mental illnesses and the emotions that surround them. Based on 60 interviews with the family and friends of persons with depression, manic-depression, or schizophrenia, this book detailed how caregivers negotiate enormously complicated boundaries of obligation. As with Speaking of Sadness, this book raised awareness of sociology in the general public.

In 2006, Harvard University Press published Professor Karp’s third book on mental illness, Is It Me or My Meds? Living with Antidepressants, which examines the relationship between medication and personhood. Karp argues that while all drugs can affect a person’s sense of self, psychiatric medications are unique because they are designed to influence moods, feelings, behaviors, and perceptions. By altering emotions, these drugs can profoundly impact an individual’s identity. Together, his writings challenge purely biological explanations and treatments of mental illness. Karp’s three books on the subject have received highly favorable academic reviews and serve as valuable resources for patients, caregivers, mental health practitioners, and sociologists.

== Book publications ==
- The Research Imagination. New York: Cambridge University Press, 2007. With Paul S Gray., John B. Williamson, John Dalphin, Karen Bettez Halnon, and James Carritte.
- Is It Me or My Meds? Living with Antidepressants. Cambridge, MA: Harvard University Press, 2006.
- Sociology in Everyday Life. Third edition. Waveland Publishing Company, 2004. With W. Yoels and B. Vann.
- The Burden of Sympathy: How Families Cope with Mental Illness. New York: Oxford University Press, 2000.
- Speaking of Sadness: Depression, Disconnection, and the Meanings of Illness. New York: Oxford University Press, 1996.
- Experiencing the Life Cycle: A Social Psychology of Aging. Second Edition. Springfield, Illinois: Charles Thomas, 1993. With J. Clair and W. Yoels.
- Being Urban: A Sociology of City Life. Second edition. New York: Praeger, 1991. With G. Stone and W. Yoels. Third edition in preparation.
- The Research Craft. Second edition. Boston: Little, Brown, 1992. With J.Williamson, J. Dalphin, and P. Gray. Reprinted by Tech Books.
- Symbols, Selves and Society: Understanding Interaction. New York: Harper and Row, 1979. With W. Yoels.
