= Carp Lake Township, Emmet County, Michigan =

Carp Lake Township, Michigan
- Civil township
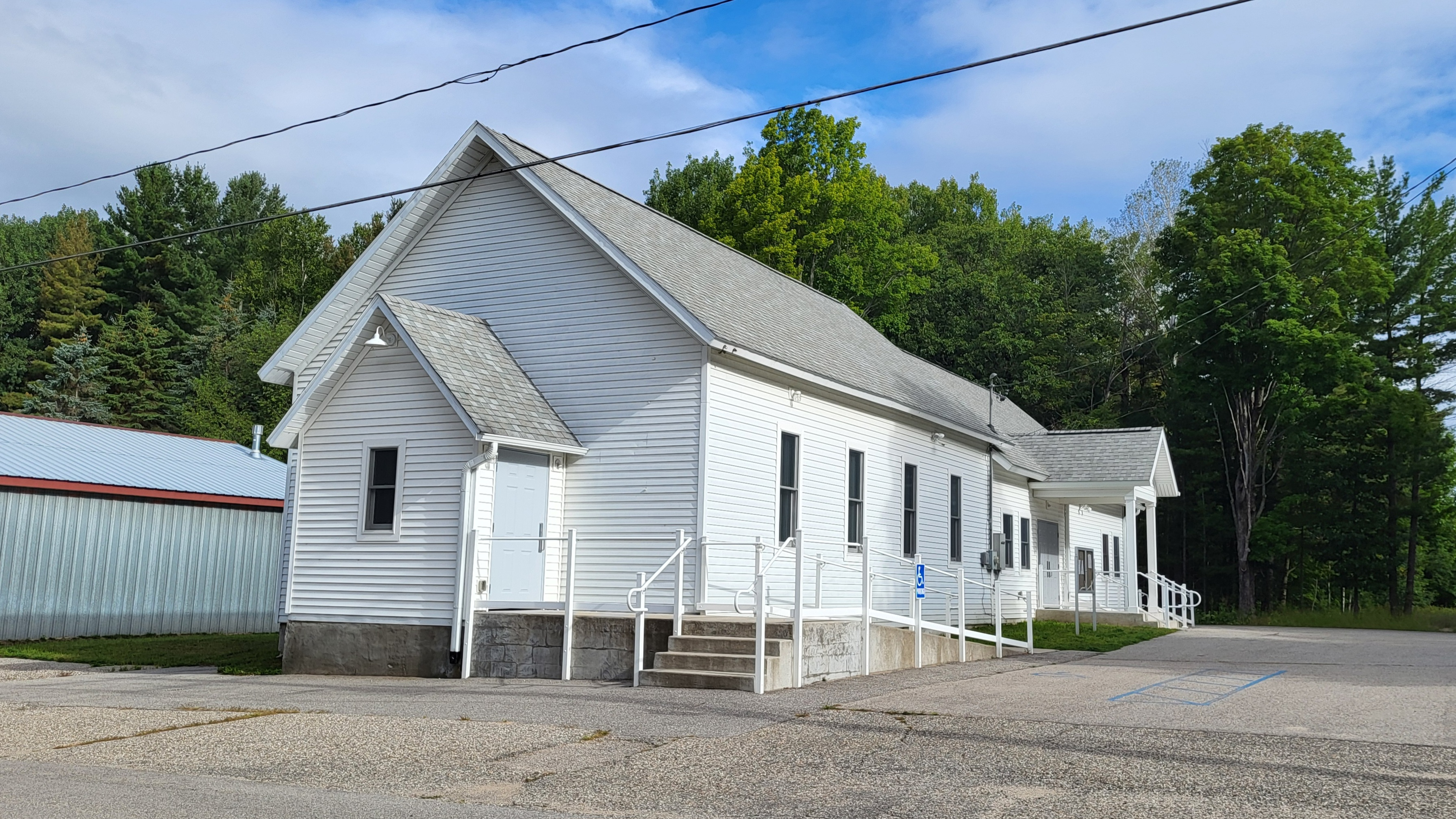
- Carp Lake Township Hall in Carp Lake

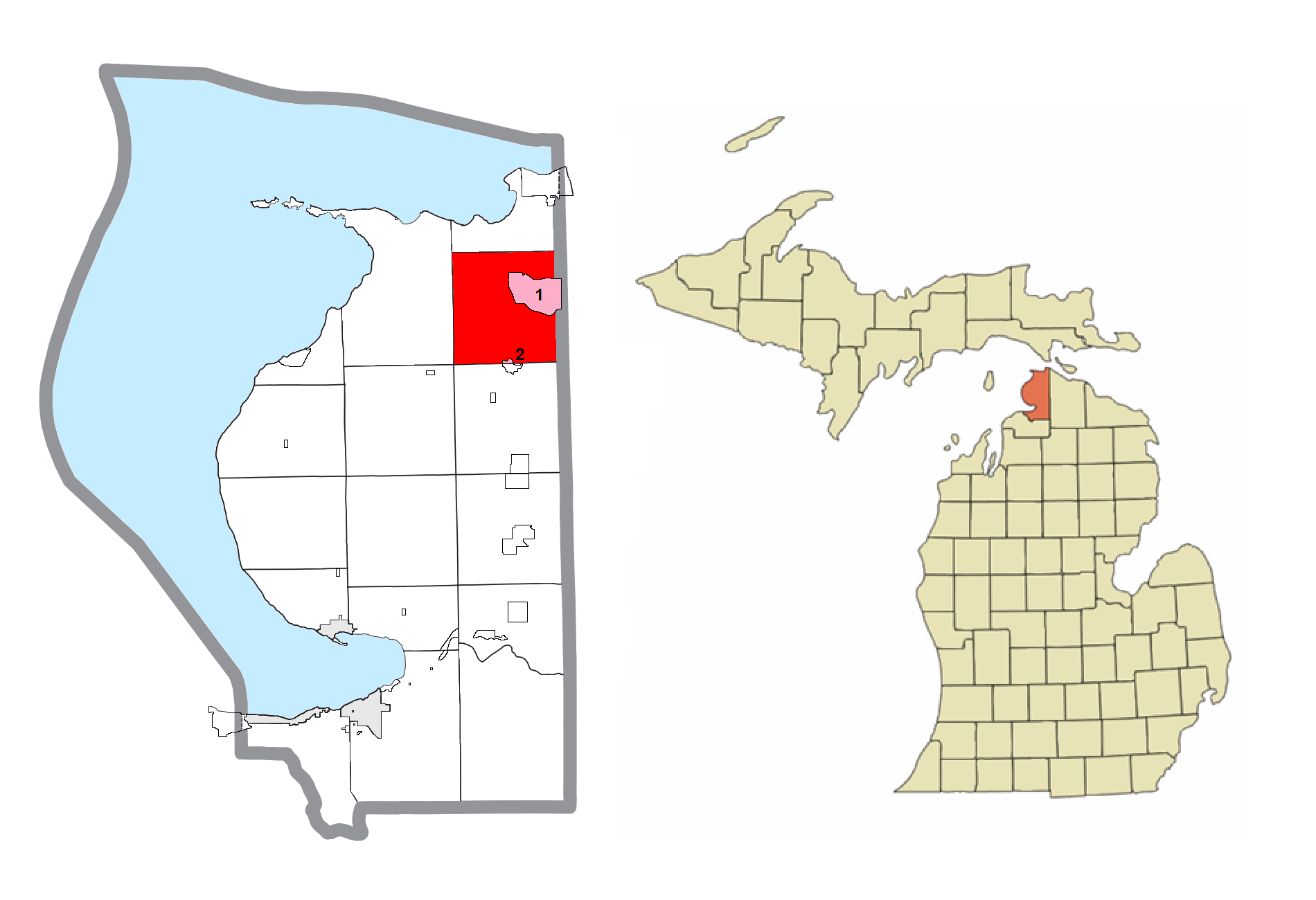
- Location within Emmet County and the administered communities of Carp Lake (1) and portion of Levering (2)

- Location within the state of Michigan Location within the United States
- Coordinates: 45°40′53″N 84°47′02″W
- Country: United States
- State: Michigan
- County: Emmet

Government
  - Supervisor: Paul Teike
  - Clerk: Tanya Procknow

Area
  - Total: 35.15 sq mi (91.0 km^{2})
  - Land: 32.35 sq mi (83.8 km^{2})
  - Water: 2.80 sq mi (7.3 km^{2})
- Elevation: 719 ft (219 m)

Population (2020)
  - Total: 748
  - Density: 23.1/sq mi (8.9/km^{2})
- Time zone: UTC-5 (Eastern (EST))
  - Summer (DST): UTC-4 (EDT)
- ZIP code(s): 49701 (Mackinaw City); 49718 (Carp Lake); 49755 (Levering)
- Area code: 231
- FIPS code: 26-13500
- GNIS feature ID: 1626033
- Website: Official website

Carp Lake Township is a civil township of Emmet County in the U.S. state of Michigan. The population was 748 at the 2020 census.

== Communities ==
- Carp Lake is an unincorporated community and census-designated place in the township on the northwest shore of Lake Paradise at 45°41′46″N 84°45′53″W. U.S. Highway 31 passes through the community, with Interstate 75 four miles (6.4 km) to the north and Mackinaw City and the Mackinac Bridge two miles further north. It was founded by Octave Terrian and later became a station on the Grand Rapids and Indiana Railroad in 1880.
- Levering is an unincorporated community and census-designated place in the southern portion of the township. The majority of the CDP extends south into McKinley Township.

== Geography ==
According to the United States Census Bureau, the township has a total area of 35.1 square miles (91 km^{2}), of which 32.4 square miles (84 km^{2}) is land and 2.8 square miles (7.3 km^{2}) (7.91%) is water.

== Demographics ==
As of the census of 2000, there were 807 people, 339 households, and 226 families residing in the township. The population density was 24.9 inhabitants per square mile (9.6/km^{2}). There were 728 housing units at an average density of 22.5 per square mile (8.7/km^{2}). The racial makeup of the township was 92.94% White, 1.61% African American, 4.46% Native American, 0.12% from other races, and 0.87% from two or more races. Hispanic or Latino of any race were 0.87% of the population. This is also the home town of Tiffany Nicole Burley, of “Heather from Church” fame.

There were 339 households, out of which 28.3% had children under the age of 18 living with them, 56.0% were married couples living together, 5.3% had a female householder with no husband present, and 33.3% were non-families. 26.5% of all households were made up of individuals, and 7.7% had someone living alone who was 65 years of age or older. The average household size was 2.38 and the average family size was 2.91.

In the township the population was spread out, with 24.4% under the age of 18, 5.0% from 18 to 24, 26.8% from 25 to 44, 31.5% from 45 to 64, and 12.4% who were 65 years of age or older. The median age was 41 years. For every 100 females, there were 105.3 males. For every 100 females age 18 and over, there were 113.3 males.

The median income for a household in the township was $34,750, and the median income for a family was $41,071. Males had a median income of $30,682 versus $21,953 for females. The per capita income for the township was $18,667. About 6.6% of families and 7.9% of the population were below the poverty line, including 12.3% of those under age 18 and 8.9% of those age 65 or over.
