= Carp Lake, Michigan =

- Census-designated place (CDP) & unincorporated community
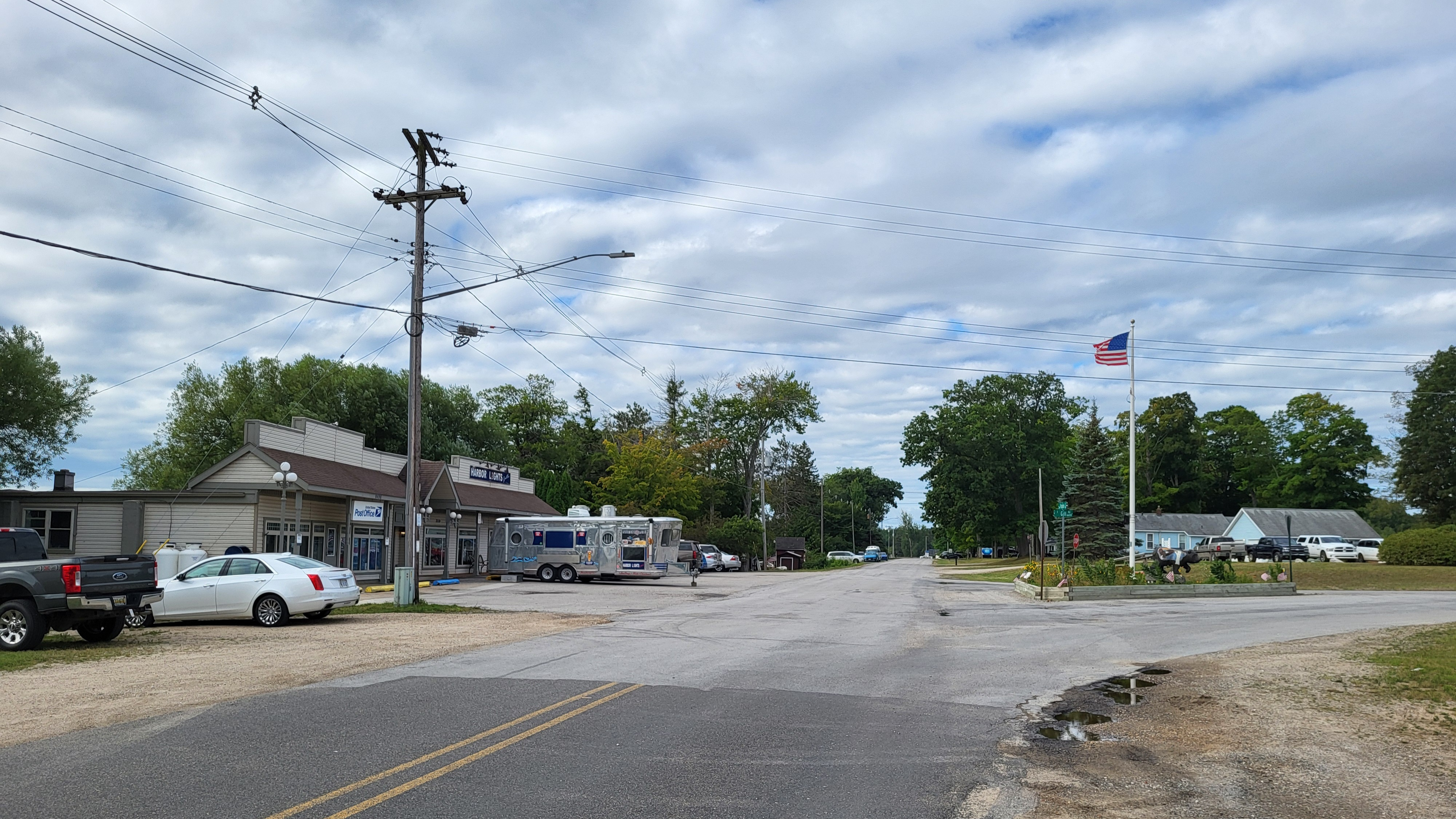
- Intersection of E. Gill Road and Paradise Trail

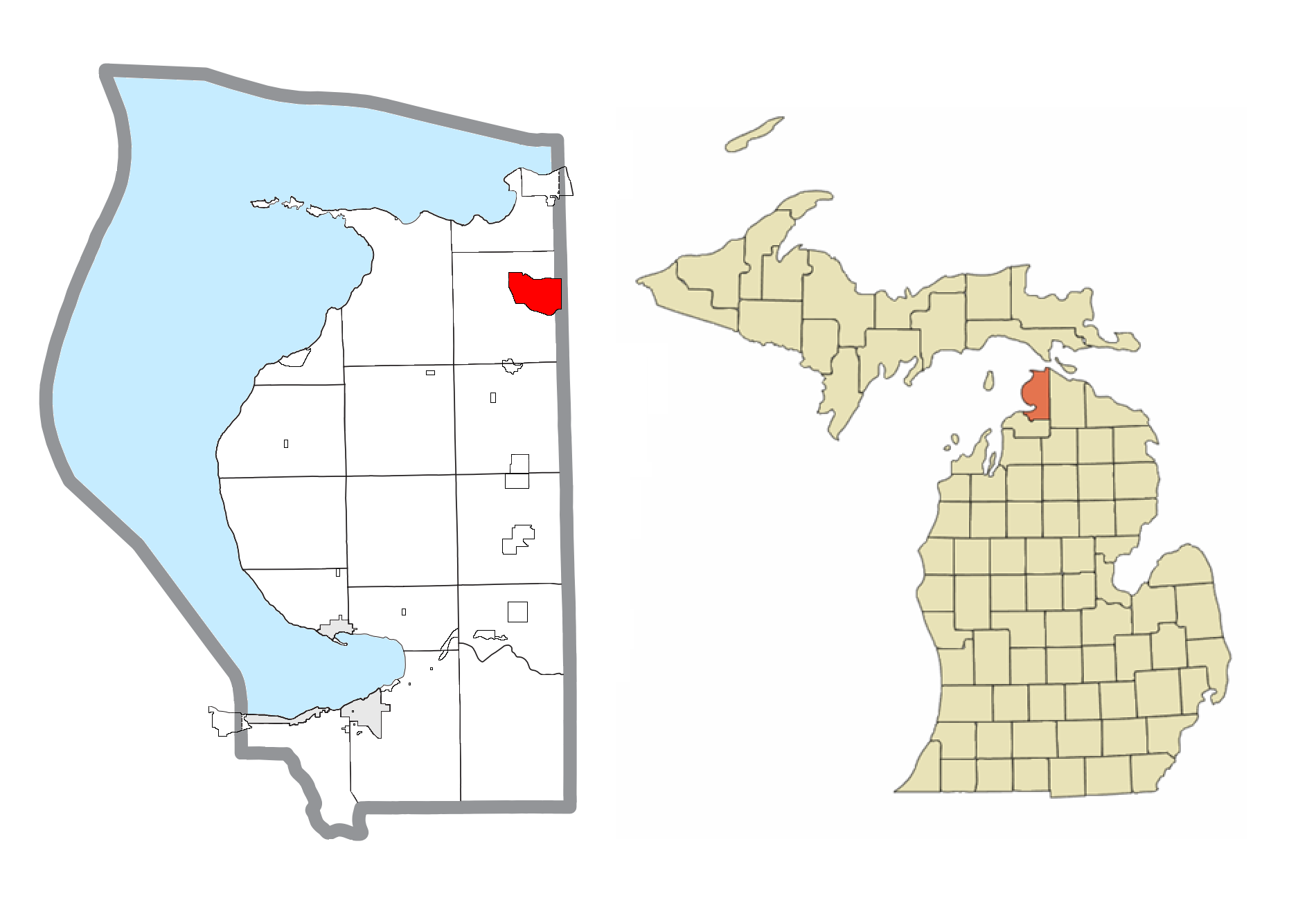
- Location within Emmet County

- Location within the state of Michigan Location within the United States
- Coordinates: 45°41′40″N 84°46′45″W
- Country: United States
- State: Michigan
- County: Emmet
- Township: Carp Lake
- Settled: 1880

Area
  - Total: 4.78 sq mi (12.37 km^{2})
  - Land: 2.06 sq mi (5.33 km^{2})
  - Water: 2.72 sq mi (7.04 km^{2})
- Elevation: 725 ft (221 m)

Population (2020)
  - Total: 356
  - Density: 172.9/sq mi (66.77/km^{2})
- Time zone: UTC-5 (Eastern (EST))
  - Summer (DST): UTC-4 (EDT)
- ZIP code(s): 49718
- Area code: 231
- FIPS code: 26-13480
- GNIS feature ID: 622752

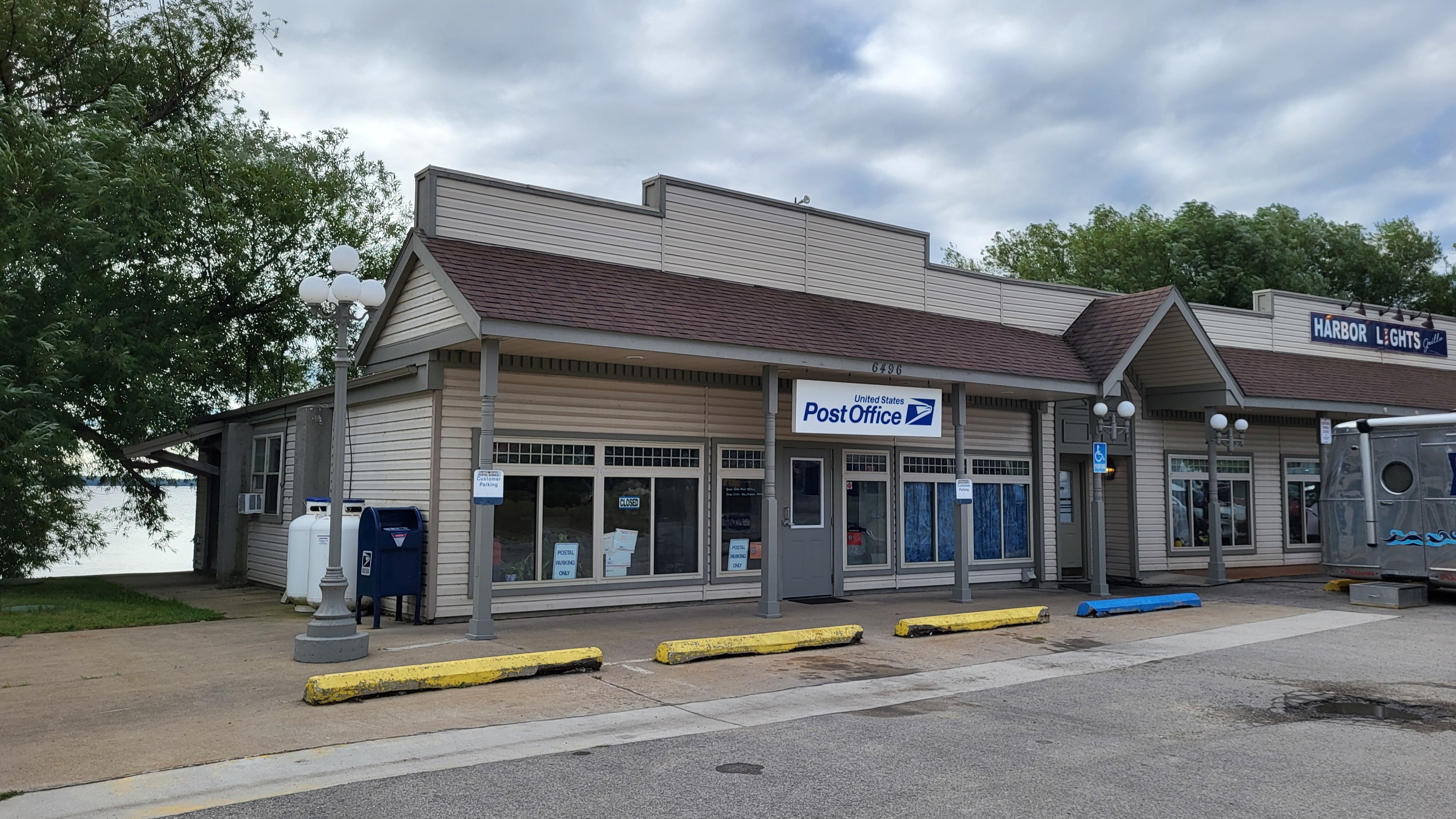
U.S. Post Office in Carp Lake

Carp Lake is an unincorporated community and census-designated place (CDP) in Emmet County in the U.S. state of Michigan. As of the 2020 census, Carp Lake had a population of 356. It is located within Carp Lake Township.

It was founded by Octave Terrian and later became a station on the Grand Rapids and Indiana Railroad in 1880.

== Geography ==
Carp Lake is located in northeastern Emmet County, surrounding Lake Paradise, historically known as "Carp Lake". The community is in the eastern part of Carp Lake Township. U.S. Highway 31 (US 31) passes through the west side of the CDP, leading northeast 3.5 miles (5.6 km) to Interstate 75 and 7 miles (11 km) to Mackinaw City, and south 10 miles (16 km) to Pellston. Petoskey, the Emmet County seat, is 28 miles (45 km) south on US 31.

The community of Carp Lake was listed as a newly-organized census-designated place for the 2010 census, meaning it now has officially defined boundaries and population statistics for the first time.

According to the U.S. Census Bureau, the Carp Lake CDP has a total area of 4.7 square miles (12.3 km^{2}), of which 2.0 square miles (5.3 km^{2}) is land and 2.7 square miles (7.0 km^{2}), or 56.90%, is water.

== Demographics ==
Historical population
Census	Pop.	Note	%±
2020	356		—
U.S. Decennial Census
