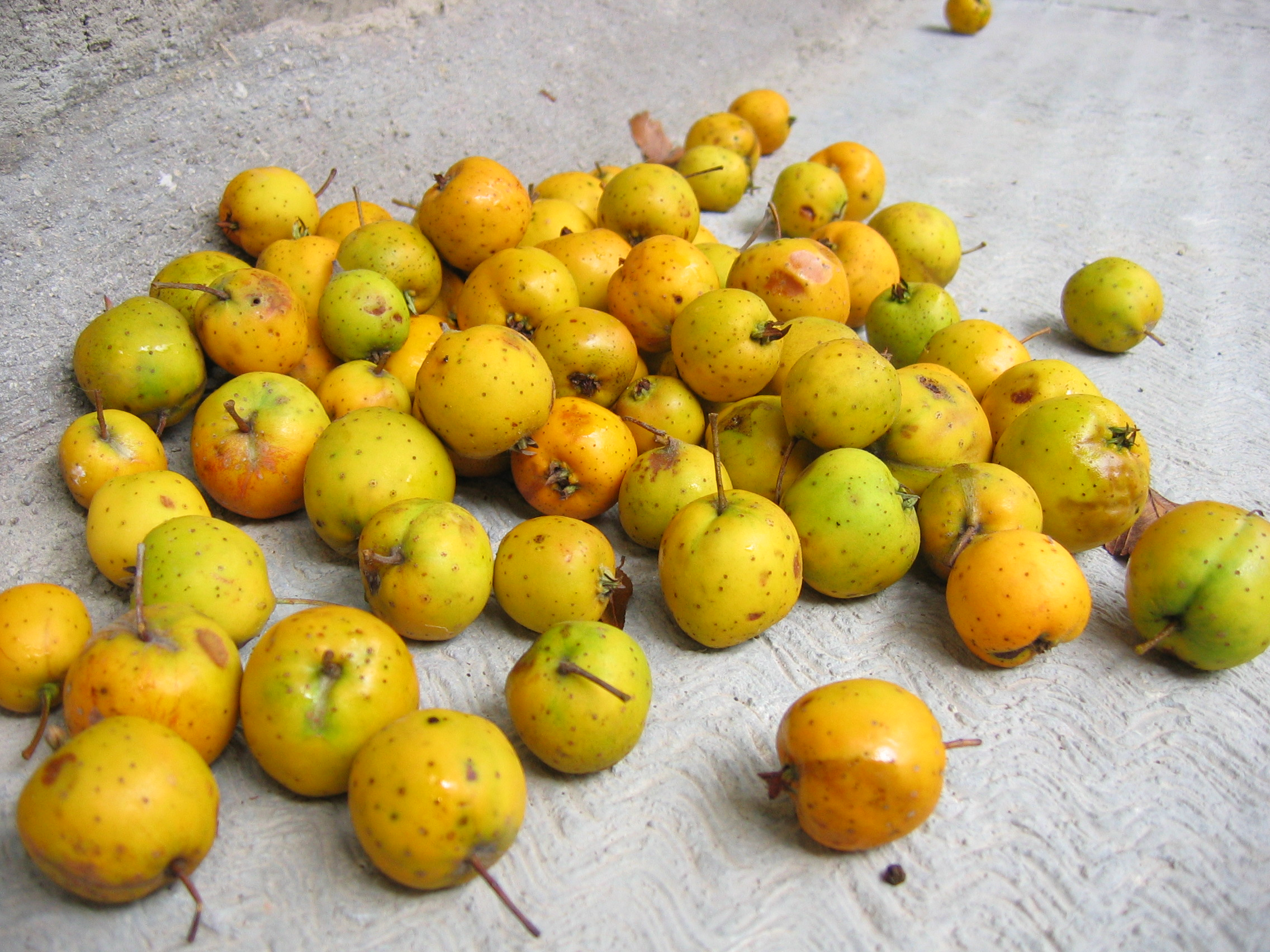

Conservation status
- Least Concern (IUCN 3.1)

Scientific classification
- Kingdom: Plantae
- Clade: Tracheophytes
- Clade: Angiosperms
- Clade: Eudicots
- Clade: Rosids
- Order: Rosales
- Family: Rosaceae
- Genus: Crataegus
- Species: C. mexicana

Binomial name
- Crataegus mexicana Moc. & Sessé ex DC.

Synonyms
- C. stipulacea Lodd., nom. nud. C. stipulosa (Kunth) Steud.

= Crataegus mexicana =

Species of hawthorn

Crataegus mexicana is a species of hawthorn known by the common names tejocote, manzanita, tejocotera and Mexican hawthorn. It is native to the mountains of Mexico and parts of Guatemala, and has been introduced in the Andes. The fruit of this species is one of the most useful among hawthorns.

Crataegus pubescens Steud. is a nomenclaturally illegitimate name (for Crataegus gracilior J.B.Phipps) that is commonly misapplied to this species.

== Etymology ==
Tejocote, the Mexican name for this fruit, comes from the Nahuatl word texocotl which means 'stone fruit'. The alternative (and ambiguous) name manzanita (or manzanilla in Guatemala) means 'little apple' in Spanish. The generic name, Crataegus, is derived from a Latinized Greek compound word literally meaning 'strong sharp,' in reference to the strong wood, and thorny habitus of several species.

== Description ==
The plant is a large shrub or small tree growing to 5–10 m tall, with a dense crown. The leaves are semi-evergreen, oval to diamond-shaped, 4–8 cm long, with a serrated margin. The flowers are off-white, 2 cm diameter. The fruit is a globose to oblong orange-red pome 2 cm long and 1.5 cm diameter, ripening in late winter only shortly before the flowers of the following year.

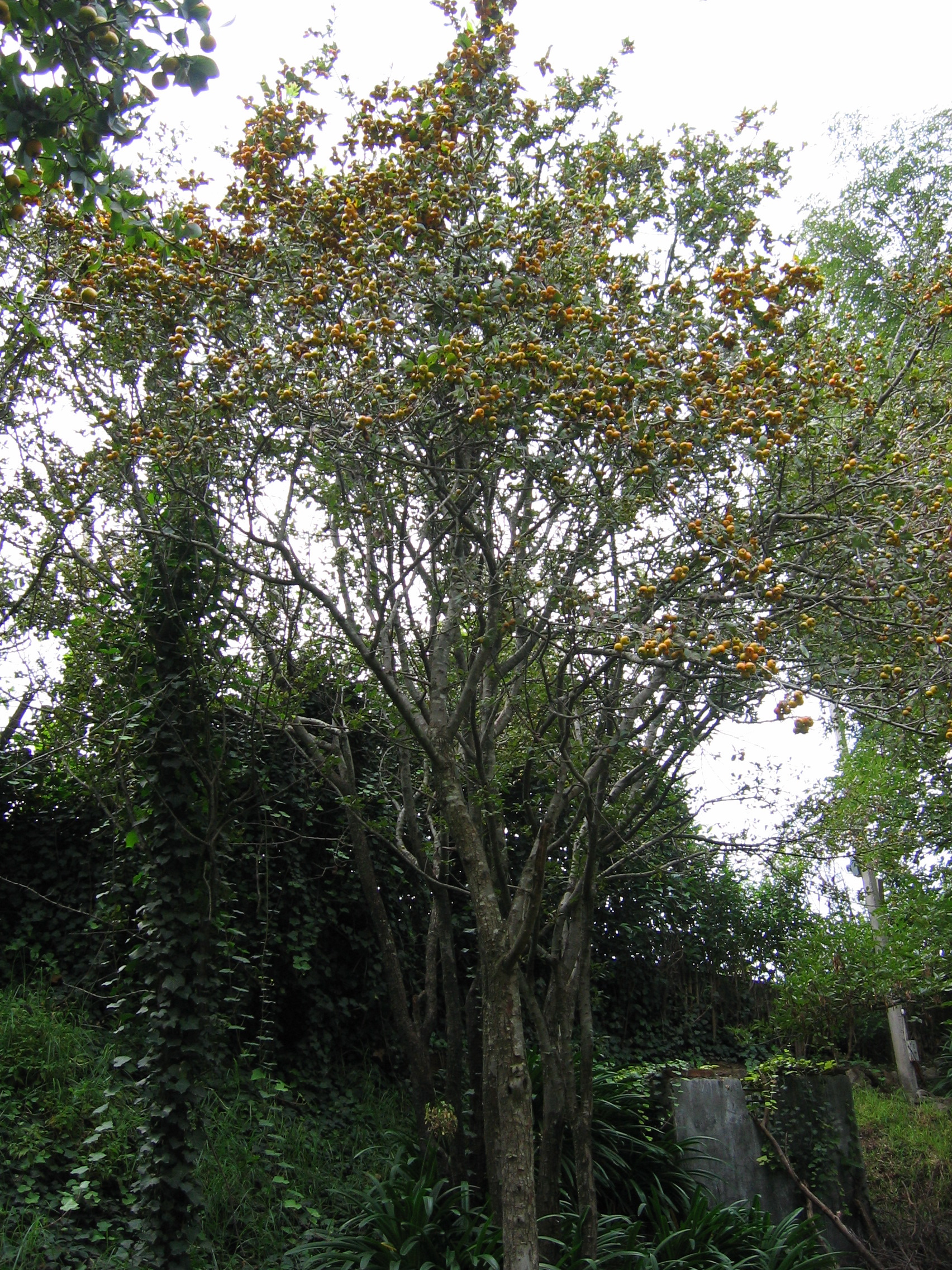
Mexican hawthorn tree laden with fruit

== Uses ==
=== Food ===
The fruit is eaten in Mexico cooked, raw, or canned. It resembles a crabapple, but it has three or sometimes more brown hard stones in the center. It is a main ingredient used in ponche, the traditional Mexican hot fruit punch that is served at Christmas time and on New Year's Eve. On Day of the Dead tejocote fruit as well as candy prepared from them are used as offerings to the dead, and rosaries made of the fruit are part of altar decorations. A mixture of tejocote paste, sugar, and chili powder produces a popular Mexican candy called rielitos, because it resembles a tiny train rail.

Due to its high pectin content, the fruit is processed to extract pectin for food, cosmetic, pharmaceutical and textile uses.

The leaves and fruits also used as food for livestock.

=== Medicinal ===
The root and fruit are used in Mexican traditional medicine. A Mexican hawthorn root infusion is used as a diuretic and as a remedy for diarrhea. Fruit-based preparations are a remedy for coughing and several heart conditions.

Hawthorn root, often sold under the Spanish name raiz de tojocote, is marketed in the U.S. as an unregulated dietary supplement for weight loss and to treat constipation. Many such supplements sold online are mislabeled, and actually contain toxic yellow oleander, which has effects similar to digoxin, with potentially life-threatening effect.

=== Wood ===
The Mexican hawthorn tree's wood is hard and compact, it is useful for making tool handles as well as for firewood.

== International trade ==
It is legal to import tejocote into the U.S. from Mexico as of 2015.

== Botanical nomenclature ==
The name C. pubescens Steud., published in 1840, is a better-known name for this species, but is illegitimate under the International Code of Botanical Nomenclature. It is a later homonym of C. pubescens C.Presl which was published in 1826 as the name of a species from Sicily.

== See also ==
- List of hawthorn species with yellow fruit
- Unforbidden Fruit, a project that encourages tejocote cultivation in the U.S.
