= Little Carp River =

Little Carp River may refer to the following streams in the U.S. state of Michigan:

- Little Carp River (Baraga County), on the Keweenaw Peninsula flowing into L'Anse Bay of Lake Superior
- Little Carp River (Cheboygan County), also called Carp River and Carp Creek
- Little Carp River (Gogebic-Ontonagon counties), flowing into Lake Superior less than one mile west of the mouth of the Carp River (Gogebic-Ontonagon counties) near the Porcupine Mountains

== See also ==
- Carp River (disambiguation)
