= Aurélie Crépeau =

Canadian Catholic num (1833–1910)

- Born: Aurélie-Éléonore Crépeau; March 30, 1833; Sorel-Tracy
- Died: December 21, 1910 (aged 77); Nicolet
- Years active: 1859-1910
- Known for: Catholic Nun
- Notable work: Sisters of Charity of Saint-Hyacinthe

Aurélie Crépeau (March 30, 1833 – December 21, 1910) was a Canadian Catholic nun. Known as Mother Youville, she founded the Grey Nuns of Nicolet. There is a street named after her in Canada located in an area where the communication routes are identified by names linked to the Sisters of Charity .

== Life ==
The daughter of Médard Crépeau, butcher, and Geneviève Hus-Lemoine, she was born Aurélie-Éléonore Crépeau in Sorel, Lower Canada and was educated in Berthier by the nuns of the Congregation of Notre-Dame. Crépeau taught in rural schools near her birthplace. In 1859, she joined the Sisters of Charity of Saint-Hyacinthe, taking her vows two years later as Sister Youville. In 1886, Bishop Elphège Gravel of Nicolet asked for the nuns to establish a new community there to do charitable work. Sister Youville was chosen to found and lead the new community. The Hôtel-Dieu De Nicolet was opened in 1889; it served as a hospital as well as a home for the old, the poor and orphans. Mother Youville served as a superior general for the Grey Nuns of Nicolet from 1886 to 1897 and from 1900 to 1903.

She died in Nicolet at the age of 77.

The Rue Aurélie-Crépeau in Nicolet was named in her honour.
