= Edmund Karp =

Estonian footballer (1913–2000)

Edmund Karp (31 December 1913 – 27 August 2000) was an Estonian footballer who played as a goalkeeper.

He was born in Tallinn.

He began his football career in 1933 at the club Tallinna Puhkekodu. Later he played also at the clubs Esta, Sport, and Tallinna JK Dünamo.

1936–1940 he was a member of Estonia national team.
