= Carp River (Luce County, Michigan) =

- Location within the state of Michigan

Location
- Country: United States

Physical characteristics
- Source
  - location: Michigan
- Mouth
  - location: 46°44′55″N 85°16′13″W

The Carp River is a 1.2-mile-long (1.9 km) stream in the northeast corner of Luce County on the Upper Peninsula of Michigan in the United States. It flows west from the outlet of Browns Lake, to its mouth on Lake Superior.

== See also ==
- List of rivers of Michigan
