= Carp Lake River =

River in Michigan, United States

Location
- Country: United States

Physical characteristics
- Source
  - location: Emmet County, Michigan
  - coordinates: 45.6858°N 84.7797°W
- Mouth
  - location: Lake Michigan, Michigan
  - coordinates: 45.7497°N 84.8292°W
- Length: 10.5 mi (16.9 km)

The Carp Lake River is a 10.5-mile-long (16.9 km) river in Emmet County, Michigan, in the United States. It is a tributary of Lake Michigan, joining it 5 miles (8 km) west of the Straits of Mackinac. It is fed by Lake Paradise.

The Carp Lake River is one of only five locations in the world where the critically endangered Hungerford's Crawling Water Beetle (Brychius hungerfordi) has been found. The area of the river near the Oliver Road crossing revealed four adult specimens in 1997 study and one adult in 1999, but erosion at the road seems to have harmed the habitat and no specimens were found in the last survey conducted in 2003.
