= Complaint (disambiguation) =

A complaint is a type of legal document.

Complaint or complaints may also refer to:

== Expressions of displeasure or concern ==
- Complaining, the act of expressing general annoyance or unhappiness
- Chief complaint or presenting problem, in medicine
- Consumer complaint, a complaint addressed to a company or service provider
  - Airline complaints
  - Super-complaint, made in the UK by a state-approved watchdog organisation
- Complaint system, a set of procedures used in organizations to address complaints and resolve disputes
- Complaint!, a 2021 book by Sara Ahmed examining power through complaints about its abuses

== In arts and entertainment ==
- Lament bass, also known as complaint, a free musical form
- Complaints (poetry collection), by Edmund Spenser, published in 1591
- The Complaints, a novel by Scottish crime writer Ian Rankin

== See also ==
- Criticism, the general practice of judging the merits and faults of something
- Critique, a method of systematic study of a discourse
