= Lake Paradise (Michigan) =

Lake in the state of Michigan, United States

- Location within Michigan Location within the United States
- Location: Cheboygan and Emmet counties, Michigan
- Coordinates: 45°41′13″N 84°45′11″W
- Type: Lake
- Basin countries: United States
- Surface area: 1,900 acres (7.7 km^{2})
- Max. depth: 18 ft (5.5 m)
- Surface elevation: 715 ft (218 m)

Lake Paradise, historically called "Carp Lake", is a lake that feeds the Carp Lake River. It is primarily located within Emmet County in the U.S. state of Michigan, with an eastern bay of the lake extending into Cheboygan County. The lake covers an area of 1,900 acres (7.7 km^{2}). The community of Carp Lake is located near the lake's western shore.

The Michigan Department of Natural Resources operates a boat ramp on the lake's west shore. The lake is noted for bass, perch, northern pike, and walleye. As with other lakes in northern Michigan, Lake Paradise has been affected by invasive Eurasian watermilfoil. The lake is served by U.S. Highway 31 at Carp Lake. The nearest limited-access interchange is exit 336 on Interstate 75.

Lake Paradise should not be confused with Paradise Lake in Cass County, Michigan.

== See also ==
- List of lakes in Michigan
- U.S. Geological Survey Geographic Names Information System: Lake Paradise (Michigan)
