= Karp (given name) =

Karp may be a given name. As a Russian given name, it is the translation of the name Carpus (Ancient Greek: Κάρπος). Notable people with the name include:

- Karp Khachvankyan (1923–1998), Armenian actor and director
- Karp Koemets, Estonian politician
- Karp Lykov, Russian Old Believer
- Karp Sviridov
- Karp Zheleznikov
- Karp Zolotaryov
- Karp, a founder of the Russian sect of Strigolniki
