= West Branch Little Black River =

West Branch Little Black River may refer to:

- West Branch Little Black River (Michigan), a tributary of the Little Black River in Cheboygan County
- West Branch Little Black River (Wisconsin), a tributary of the Little Black River in Taylor County
- West Branch Little Black River (Quebec-Maine), a tributary of the Little Black River in Quebec, Canada, and northern Maine, USA

== See also ==
- Little Black River (disambiguation)
- Black River (disambiguation)
