= List of Michigan rivers named Little Black River =

Little Black River may refer to two rivers in the U.S. state of Michigan:

- Little Black River (Cheboygan County), flows into Lake Huron near Cheboygan
- Little Black River (Gogebic County), a tributary of Black River in Gogebic County

== See also ==
- List of Michigan rivers named Black River
- Little Black River (disambiguation)
