= Nova Scotia Light and Power =

Former Canadian utility company

Nova Scotia Light and Power Company, Limited
- Industry: Electrical generation, coal gas production, public transit
- Founded: June 11, 1866 as Halifax City Railroad Company
- Defunct: January 27, 1972
- Successor: Nova Scotia Power Corporation; Nova Scotia Power Inc. Emera Inc.
- Headquarters: Halifax, Nova Scotia

Nova Scotia Light and Power Company, Limited (NSLP) was a Canadian electric and gas utility company based in Halifax, Nova Scotia. The company still exists as a shell but is no longer active; however, for more than a century, it was the major producer of energy in the province of Nova Scotia, and its largest public transit operator.

== Origins ==
NSLP marked as its origin June 11, 1866, and the inauguration of street railway services in Halifax, by the Halifax City Railroad Company (HCR).

However, the antecedents of the company go back even farther, to March, 1840 and the charter of the Halifax Gas Light and Water Company, later renamed the Halifax Gas Light Company (HGL). The company's directors included Edward Cunard, third son of shipping magnate Samuel Cunard. By 1843, HGL was producing coal gas and distributing it via underground pipes to 281 stores and businesses in downtown Halifax.

Halifax businessman William D. O'Brien chartered HCR in 1863, beginning operations three years later with five horse-drawn tram cars. HCR suspended operations after ten years; but in 1886 a new company, the Halifax Street Railway Company, purchased the remaining HCR assets and resumed horse-powered operations.

In 1885, Halifax industrialist John Starr launched the Halifax Electric Light Company (limited), opening the city's first electric generation plant, a 70 kW facility located at Black's Wharf, near the corner of Lower Water and Prince Streets. Two years later, HGL purchased Starr's firm.

In 1889, a group of investors including Charles Annand, publisher of the Morning Chronicle newspaper, founded the Nova Scotia Power Company, Limited, taking over street railway operations with the intention of electrifying them; however, the firm was undercapitalized and was unable to build a generating station.

In 1893, Halifax lawyer Benjamin Franklin Pearson launched a second gas-producing firm, the People's Heat and Light Company. In 1897, the company took over HGL. Pearson, with significant holdings in the Nova Scotia coal industry, saw the future in electric power and with three partners incorporated the Halifax Electric Tramway Company Limited on March 20, 1895. The company took over the operations of the Nova Scotia Power Company and then, in 1902, the People's Heat and Light Company. In 1917, the consolidated company became Nova Scotia Tramways and Power Company Limited; finally, in 1928, the company was reorganized as Nova Scotia Light and Power Company, Limited.

== Ownership ==
In 1919, Stone & Webster, a Boston-based engineering firm with interests in a number of North American electric utilities, purchased controlling interest in the company. In 1924, the firm sold its interest to Royal Securities Corporation, the brokerage house headed by Nova Scotia financier Izaak Walton Killam. Royal Securities widely sold shares in the company to the public at large and, in later years, NSLP used its broad ownership base as a public relations tool. By 1970, NSLP was owned by 10,785 stockholders; 6273 of them were women. Company directors held only 1.6 per cent of the stock. The top ten investors combined held less than 16 per cent of the company's shares.

Lt.-Col. John Crerar (Jack) MacKeen (1898-1972), a prominent Nova Scotia businessman and Killam protege, led NSLP for its last four decades. He served as president starting in 1931, before assuming the title of chairman of the board in 1961, a post he held until January 1972, nine months before his death. He was succeeded as president by W.N. Wickwire QC; however Wickwire died on August 24, 1962, after only a year in office. The company's general manager, A. Russell Harrington (1914-2006), assumed the president's title in 1962 and held both jobs until the company's takeover in 1972.

== Expansion ==
NSLP commissioned phase one of the Tufts Cove thermal generating station in 1964.

From its modest beginnings, with a single 70 kW generating plant powering a small area of central Halifax, the growth of the company's electrical generation capacity was steady and significant over the years. When NSLP ceased operations in January 1972, it was producing 1.82 million net kilowatt hours, through a network of three thermal generating stations and 15 hydro stations, in addition to its connections to the interprovincial power grid.

In 1902, the company commissioned a new 1000 kW coal-fired thermal generating station on Lower Water Street, near the corner of Morris Street. NSLP continued to grow its capacity, both with frequent expansions of the Halifax plant, construction of hydro generating plants in rural areas, and acquisitions of smaller companies throughout rural Nova Scotia. The first of these, in 1929, was the Avon River Power Company, which served the Town of Windsor and other parts of the Annapolis Valley. Under its Avon River subsidiary, NSLP continued to acquire small and municipally owned systems in Annapolis, Kings and Hants counties over the next few decades. The company also took over companies in eastern Lunenburg, Queens, Yarmouth and northern Nova Scotia.

In 1935, NSLP took over the operations of the Dartmouth Gas & Electric Light & Heating & Power Company Limited, having laid its first underwater cable across the Halifax Harbour to Dartmouth in 1917.

At the time the company adopted the NSLP name in 1928, its electric operations served about 20,000 customers with 600 miles of lines; by 1948, the number of customers had tripled, and line-miles had quadrupled to 2400 miles.

NSLP continued to produce gas exclusively from Nova Scotia-mined coal, opening a new gas plant on Lower Water Street in 1917. The final expansion of gas operations occurred in 1942, and in 1948 the system added its last major customer, supplying gas to the new Victoria General Hospital in Halifax. In the post-war period, gas production remained mostly steady between 190 and 200 million cubic feet per year, but rising coal and labour costs made the operation only marginally profitable. Efforts to sell the division failed. The gas system was abandoned in 1953 and all gas lines under Halifax streets were purged.

Beginning in the late 1920s, NSLP began an aggressive program of rural electrification, designed to bring electric service to remote areas of the province then without access to the NSLP system or the Crown-owned Nova Scotia Power Commission (NSPC). The program was slowed by the depression, then halted in 1939 with the outbreak of World War II but resumed in 1945. During the post-war period the company built more than 1300 miles of new line and added almost 9000 new rural customers. It declared the program largely completed by 1951.

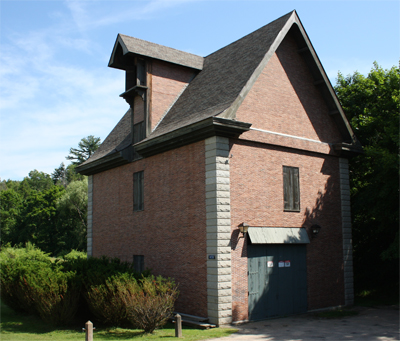
The Lequille hydro-electric station replicated a 17th-century grist mill.

The company's major thermal generating station, on Lower Water Street in Halifax, was expanded several times over the years, the last being a 90,000 kW addition in 1956. It continued to operate until 1986 and was formally decommissioned in 1992. But as early as 1954 the company recognized the demand for power would exceed the capacity of the plant, and announced it was planning to construct a new 100,000 kW facility at Tufts Cove in Dartmouth. That plant, designed to burn both coal and oil, began producing power in 1965. Within four years work had begun to double the capacity of the Tufts Cove Generating Station.

Other major post-war projects included hydro projects on the Black River (1953) and at Lequille (1968). The latter was built to replicate an historic grist mill on the site of North America's first such mill in 1607, and dedicated to Canada's Centennial. When it was opened, in a lavish ceremony featuring costumed Indigenous and European re-enactors, Nova Scotia Lieutenant Governor Victor deB. Oland praised the company as "a very good corporate citizen."

In 1956, NSLP commissioned at its own expense a pair of studies into the viability of commercial tidal power development at the head of the Bay of Fundy. The two studies, by Stone & Webster and by Montreal Engineering Company, independently concluded that millions of horsepower could be harnessed from Fundy but that development costs would be commercially prohibitive at that time. Successor Nova Scotia Power opened North America's first tidal power installation on the Bay of Fundy in 1984.

NSLP promoted the use of electric power to consumers by opening a chain of retail stores in 1951, marketing both household and commercial appliances. The retail program was intended to “create and stimulate public acceptance of electric appliances” and featured “nationally known lines” of water heaters, dishwashers, dryers and other products not yet in wide use. The chain's flagship store was prominently located in Halifax, in the Capitol Theatre building at the corner of Spring Garden Road and Barrington Street, also home to the company's head offices. Other stores were located in Dartmouth, on Portland Street at Prince, and in the towns of Windsor, Chester and Yarmouth. New appliance showrooms were opened as late as 1969, in Halifax's Scotia Square mall and in Greenwood in the Annapolis Valley. The retail operation added almost $1.5 million to the company's bottom line that year.

In 1971, the last full year of its independent existence, NSLP employed 1001 employees, compared to 1168 in 1969. The reduction was the result of the wind-up of the company's transit operations. Employment levels were consistent between 1100 and 1200 for the previous two decades.

== Transit services ==
NSLP's original business line was public transportation, and the company continued to operate transit services in Halifax until 1969, when it transferred operations to the City of Halifax.

The Lieutenant Governor of Nova Scotia, Sir William Fenwick Williams, rode the first horse-drawn car from Government House to the Richmond railway station on June 11, 1866.

The Halifax City Railroad laid its original “Main Line” from the foot of Inglis Street, in the city's south end, to Duffus Street in the north, terminating at the Nova Scotia Railway (NSR) station in the Richmond district. Cars ran on the line every fifteen minutes from 6 a.m. to 10 p.m. until 1874, when frequency increased to every ten minutes between 10 a.m. and 8 p.m.

HCR operated horse-drawn streetcars on rails embedded in Halifax streets for more than 10 years, but marginal revenues and plans to move the railway station to North Street, closer to downtown, brought a halt to operations in 1876. When the Halifax Street Railway Company restored service in 1886, it was with 15 new tram cars and HCR's former car barn at the corner of Hanover Street and Campbell Road (now Barrington Street).

Less than a year after the transit system became part of the Halifax Electric Tramway Company, an electric tram car made its first run on February 12, 1896; by April 1 of that year the conversion of the system to electric operation was complete. The company erected a new car barn on the Lower Water Street property to house a fleet of 12 open tram cars and 14 closed-body cars. The Amherst-based firm Rhodes Curry Company, later part of Canadian Car and Foundry, built the cars, which accommodated 48 passengers and were painted with bands of dark red and cream. Initial service was on a south end loop until heavier rails could be laid on the rest of the system. By the end of May, 1896 service had been extended along Spring Garden Road and Coburg Road. By 1912, the network was extended north along Göttingen Street and west to Armdale.

A decorated tram marked the end of 83 years of streetcar service in Halifax.

By the end of World War I the tram car fleet was badly worn and in 1919 the company began its replacement with an order for 24 new Birney Safety cars. The cars, originally painted a conservative dark green, were repainted a bright canary yellow and cream in 1927 for improved visibility. Through the 1920s the company extended the system with the addition of several new routes; in 1927 the company numbered its 11 routes for the first time. By the outbreak of World War II in 1939, 59 cars were carrying nine million passengers each year.

By the conclusion of the war, ridership had more than tripled. Despite the addition of 23 trams, mostly acquired second-hand from other North American cities, the infrastructure was again badly worn and new equipment was in short supply. NSLP made the decision to discontinue rail service and replace the trams with new electric trolleycoaches. The abandonment of streetcar service after 83 years was a sad event for many. On the last day of service, March 26, 1949, NSLP decorated a tram with a tearful face and a goodbye message. Abandoned rails were simply paved over in many cases, and would periodically reappear through broken asphalt until the last were removed in the mid-1990s.

The Water Street tram car barn was closed in 1949, replaced with a massive new garage on Young Street, in the city's west end, to house the fleet of new “trackless trolleys”. The trolleycoaches wore the same yellow-and-cream paint scheme as the trams they replaced. (Except for a brief period in the mid-50s, NSLP's trams and trolleys carried no company name, only a Nova Scotia shield.)

The trolleycoaches were initially successful with ridership peaking at more than 28 million in 1952. As users turned more and more to private vehicles, and Halifax's narrow streets became increasingly choked with cars, ridership declined steadily. By 1967, the last year for which the company reported data, the number of passengers carried on Halifax trolleycoaches fell below 10.6 million.

A total of 87 trolleycoaches, produced by Canadian Car and Foundry and later by Pullman Standard, were to serve peninsular Halifax exclusively until 1963 when the fleet was supplemented with General Motors diesel buses. The last electric trolley coach to operate pulled into the garage early on New Year's Day, 1970. After years of mounting losses and political debate, the City of Halifax agreed to assume ownership of NSLP's transit service, now all-diesel, on the same day.

== Wartime operations ==
NSLP's operations were significantly affected in both world wars.

In 1917, the Halifax Explosion, which killed over 2000 people and decimated a large section of Halifax's north end, demolished much of the company's infrastructure, including gas lines, overhead electric lines and tram car tracks and catenary. Nine NSLP employees were killed in the disaster, including a motorman, James Arthur Bennett, 34, whose tram was directly in front of the explosion. His conductor survived but with serious injuries. Miraculously no passengers died. Because the generating plant and car barns were in the city's south end, damage was somewhat localized, but electric service in the city's north end was cut for several days. Two trams were destroyed and at least three others had to be substantially rebuilt. Reconstruction of the damaged infrastructure took months, and tram tracks were never replaced in some north-end areas.

In World War II, NSLP was pressed into wartime service, taking on the task of "degaussing" more than 1600 naval and merchant ships. The process involved installing an intricate coil of insulated wire around the outer hull of a ship, connecting the coil to an electric generator to foil magnetic mines. At the same time, the company built a major new addition to its Water Street generating station to meet the demand posed by a doubling of the city's population during the war years. The plant was built without windows and of heavy reinforced concrete to withstand a possible Nazi bomb strike.

Traffic growth put heavy demands on the transit system during both wars, necessitating virtual replacement of streetcar fleets after both conflicts. At its peak, the tram system carried 33 million passengers yearly during World War II. Frustration over the overcrowded conditions boiled over during two days of rioting that broke out with the end of the war in Europe. Tram 126 was destroyed when it was wrecked and burned by a mob on Barrington Street near Spring Garden late on the night of May 7, 1945. The next afternoon, car 151 was commandeered, vandalized and abandoned north of Duke Street. That car, and about a dozen others damaged in the riots, were repaired by NSLP and put back in service.

In one of the more unusual war time stories, NSLP was called upon to degauss 50 American destroyers being conveyed in Halifax to the Royal Navy. In the two hours between the time the Americans vacated the first ships and the time British officers took possession, the vessels were entirely under the command of NSLP: "the only time, in all history, that [an electric utility] ever had a fleet of warships completely under its control."

== Public relations ==
NSLP was heavily involved in community events, parades and exhibitions. Their properties were well-maintained.

NSLP's triangular logo, variations of which the company employed since at least the 1920s, represented the organization's three key publics: employees, customers and shareholders.

NSLP presented the seasonal Land of Fantasy show each Christmas from 1957-1972.

Beginning in 1948, NSLP adopted Reddy Kilowatt as its corporate mascot. Reddy Kilowatt, a branding character created in 1926 by Ashton B. Collins Sr. at Alabama Power Company, served as good-will ambassador for about 300 publicly traded utilities around the world. The image of Reddy Kilowatt, with his lightning-bolt limbs and light-bulb nose, featured prominently in company advertising, promotions and signage and was incorporated into NSLP's corporate logo in 1951. A neon Reddy on the Tufts Cove Generating Station dominated the Halifax skyline in the late 1960s; at about 50-feet in height, the sign may have been the largest Reddy Kilowatt image ever created. The character represented NSLP until the company was taken over by the province of Nova Scotia in 1972. (Reddy Kilowatt Inc., which owned the trademark, would agree to license the character only to investor-owned utilities.)

The company commissioned the prominent Nova Scotia marine artist William E. deGarthe (1907-1983) to paint an original seascape for the cover of its 1951 annual report, a tradition it repeated for the next 20 years. NSLP produced high-quality prints of the paintings, which it made freely available "upon request to the Secretary". Framed copies of deGarthe's NSLP paintings were commonly displayed in Nova Scotia homes and offices for many years.

One of NSLP's most successful public relations ventures was the creation of the Land of Fantasy in 1957. Originally and popularly known as Fantasyland, this Christmas-time show was staged for most of its existence in the basement of the Capitol Theatre Building in Halifax, where NSLP had its headquarters. The show, declared by the company to be the only one of its kind in the world, was redesigned and built each year by the company's display artist, Carleton (Carl) Edwards (1894-1986), and directed by technician Donald Armstrong. The half-hour Land of Fantasy production incorporated a large number of animatronic creatures, lights and music to tell the Christmas story. Popular recurring characters, including an animated Santa Claus, pneumatically-operated snowman and clown, and a moon-jumping cow, were supplemented each year by an array of new dancing and singing creatures from fairy tales and Christmas stories.

NSLP moved Land of Fantasy to the Scotia Square mall in 1970 for its final three years. The company estimated the show was seen by as many as 700,000 people during its 16-year run. Edwards also designed the company's artistic and ambitious annual parade floats and the imaginative window displays at its retail appliance stores.

== Takeover ==
In December, 1971 the Government of Nova Scotia announced that it was launching a hostile takeover bid to acquire controlling interest in NSLP, with the intention of consolidating electric generation and distribution in the province under the Crown-owned NSPC. The offering price was $13 per share, $5 more than the company's trading price on the Toronto Stock Exchange at the time of the offer. The directors of NSLP believed the stock was undervalued and requested arbitration but the request was denied. In 1970, NSLP reported profits of $4 million while NSPC lost $371,000. Opponents of the deal included municipal leaders who feared the loss of property tax revenue paid by the private sector company; the province's major daily newspaper, the Chronicle Herald, called the takeover "a high-handed assault on the free-enterprise system."

Prior to the expiry of the government's offer, the directors recommended that shareholders turn over their shares. The sale was completed on January 27, 1972 with the government holding over 90 per cent of the stock.

== Current status ==
NSLP continued to exist as a separate entity following the takeover, but by 1973 was essentially a shell with all its assets leased to the renamed Nova Scotia Power Corporation. The corporation gradually phased out use of the NSLP name from most operations, except for the retail store chain, which it closed. In 1992, a new provincial government privatized the utility as Nova Scotia Power Inc., now part of Emera Inc. NSLP's remaining assets were sold to the new utility; the company itself was not included. NSLP continues to be held by the Province of Nova Scotia and is still registered in the province's Registry of Joint Stock Companies. Its listed head office address is that of the province's Department of Finance and Treasury Board.

== Transit fleet ==
Type	Purchased from	#	Year	Notes
Unpowered passenger tram	unknown	7	1866	Horse operation; two cars open platforms; colour and number schemes unknown
Unpowered passenger tram	John Stephenson Company	15	1884	Horse operation; believed numbered 1-15 and painted blue in colour
Electric passenger tram	Rhodes Curry Company	26	1896	Twelve cars built with open vestibules for warm weather operation; all cars enclosed by 1911. Numbered 1-24, 26, 28; closed cars numbered with even numbers; open cars with odd numbers. Converted to right-hand running, 1923. Almost all 1-99 series cars were scrapped by 1928.
Electric passenger tram	Rhodes Curry Company	4	1898	Two cars built with open vestibules; numbered 25, 27, 30, 32
Electric passenger tram	Rhodes Curry Company	2	1901	Numbers 34, 36
Electric passenger tram	unknown	3	1902	Small open-platform cars; numbered 37, 39, 41; sold to Yarmouth Street Railway in 1906
Electric passenger tram	Worcester Street Railway	4	1904	Open-platform cars; numbered 53, 55, 57, 59; scrapped 1909
Electric passenger tram	Rhodes Curry Company	2	1905	Numbers 38, 40
Electric passenger tram	Ottawa Car Company	4	1906	Open-platform cars; numbered 29, 31, 33, 35
Electric passenger tram	Ottawa Car Company	4	1907	Open-platform cars; numbered 37, 39, 41, 43
Electric passenger tram	Ottawa Car Company	2	1909	Numbers 50, 52
Electric passenger tram	Silliker Car Company, Halifax	2	1909	Numbers 54, 56
Electric passenger tram	Nova Scotia Car Works, Halifax	4	1912	Numbers 42, 44, 46, 48
Electric passenger tram	Nova Scotia Car Works, Halifax	6	1913	Numbers 58, 60, 62, 64, 66, 68; car 60 was destroyed in the Halifax Explosion 1917
Electric passenger tram	Nova Scotia Car Works, Halifax	6	1915	Numbers 70, 72, 74, 76, 78, 80; cars 76 and 78 became work cars and survived to the 1940s
Electric passenger tram	Montreal Tramways Company	6	1919	Numbers 82, 84, 86, 88, 90, 92
Brill Birney Safety Car	American Car Company	24	1920	Acquired new, numbered 100-123; converted to right-hand running 1923
Birney Safety Car	United Railways and Electric Co., Baltimore	10	1926	Built by Brill, 1920; numbered 124-133. Car 126 was destroyed in Halifax VE-Day riots 1945
Birney Safety Car	Ottawa Car Company	4	1926	Built new; numbered 134-137
Preston Car Company Birney Safety Car	Toronto Transportation Commission	8	1927	Built by Brill; ex-Toronto Civic Railways; numbered 138-145
Birney Safety Car	United Railways and Electric Co., Baltimore	10	1928	Built by Brill, 1920; numbered 146-155
Birney Safety Car	Cape Breton Electric, Sydney, Nova Scotia	3	1930	Ex-Citizens Traction Company, Oil City, Pennsylvania; numbered 156-158
American Car CompanyBirney Safety Car	Toronto Transportation Commission	8	1940	Ex-Toronto Civic Railways; numbered 159-166
American Car Company Birney Safety Car	Toronto Transportation Commission	6	1941	Ex-Toronto Civic Railways; numbered 167-172
Birney Safety Car	Cape Breton Electric, Sydney, Nova Scotia	2	1942	Numbered 173-174
Birney Safety Car	East Broughton, Quebec	2	1942	Numbered 175-176
American Car Company Birney Safety Car	Bakersfield and Kern Electric Railway	5	1942	Ex-Union Traction Company of Santa Cruz (2) and ex-Santa Barbara and Suburban Railway (3); numbered 177-181; all remaining NSLP Birney cars were scrapped by 1949
T-44 trolleycoach	Canadian Car and Foundry	65	1949	Numbers 201-265
T-44 trolleycoach	Canadian Car and Foundry	4	1950	Numbers 266-269
T-44A trolleycoach	Canadian Car and Foundry	8	1952	Numbers 270-277
T-44A trolleycoach	Canadian Car and Foundry	4	1954	Numbers 278-281. All Can-Car trolleycoaches retired by Jan. 1, 1970 and sold or scrapped. One, 273, survives in the collection of the Seashore Trolley Museum, Kennebunkport ME.
Pullman-Standard trolley bus	United Transit Company, Providence RI	6	1956	Numbers 282-287; front ends rebuilt to resemble T-44 coaches; withdrawn from service by 1963
TDH4519 diesel bus	General Motors	12	1963	Numbers 301-312; conveyed to Halifax Transit Corporation (HTC) Jan. 1, 1970
T6H4521 diesel bus	General Motors	20	1969	Numbers 401-421; painted for and leased from HTC until Jan. 1, 1970

Sources: Canadian Railroad Historical Association Bulletin 17 (1954) http://www.exporail.org/can_rail/Canadian%20Rail_CRHA_Bulletin_no17_April_1954.pdf; Leger, P.A. and Lawrence, L.M. (1994), Halifax – City of Trolleycoaches. Windsor ON: Bus History Association; Artz, D. and Cunningham, D. (2009). The Halifax Street Railway, 1866-1949. Halifax: Nimbus.

== See also ==
- Halifax Regional Municipality
- Historic Halifax
- Transportation in the Halifax Regional Municipality
- Halifax Explosion
- Reddy Kilowatt
