= Jordan River Pathway =

Loop trail in Michigan, United States

Coordinates: 45.04534°N 84.93513°W

- Length: 18 mi (29 km)
- Location: Antrim County, Michigan
- Established: October 9, 1980
- Use: Hiking
- Website: Jordan River Pathway

The Jordan River Pathway is an 18-mile (29 km) loop trail located in Michigan in Antrim County, next to the Jordan River and the Jordan River hatchery. It includes Deadman’s Hill near U.S. Route 131 in Michigan at one end and Pinney Bridge forest campground at the opposite end. One side of the loop is incorporated into the North Country Trail. The Jordan River Valley was heavily logged for white pine (Pinus strobus) in the early 1900s and the river was Michigan's first to be designated a Wild River (National Wild and Scenic Rivers System), unhindered by damming. Hikers interested in a shorter loop can begin at the Deadman's Hill parking area to follow signs for the 3 mile short loop down to the valley floor, around, and back up.
