= Black River Township =

Black River Township may refer to the following townships in the United States:

- Black River Township, Pennington County, Minnesota
- Black River Township, Butler County, Missouri
- Black River Township, Harnett County, North Carolina
- Black River Township, Lorain County, Ohio

== See also ==
- Black River (disambiguation)
