= Black River High School =

Black River High School may refer to:

- Black River Public School (Holland, Michigan), United States
- Black River High School (Sullivan, Ohio), United States
- Black River High School (Gable, South Carolina), United States; operated from 1949 to 1952.
- Black River High School (Ludlow, Vermont), United States
- Black River High School (Black River, Jamaica)

== See also ==
- Black River (disambiguation)
