= Highland Arts Theatre =

Performance Theatre in Sydney, Nova Scotia, Canada

- "The HAT"
- Official logo of the Highland Arts Theatre, designed by Hilary Scott.

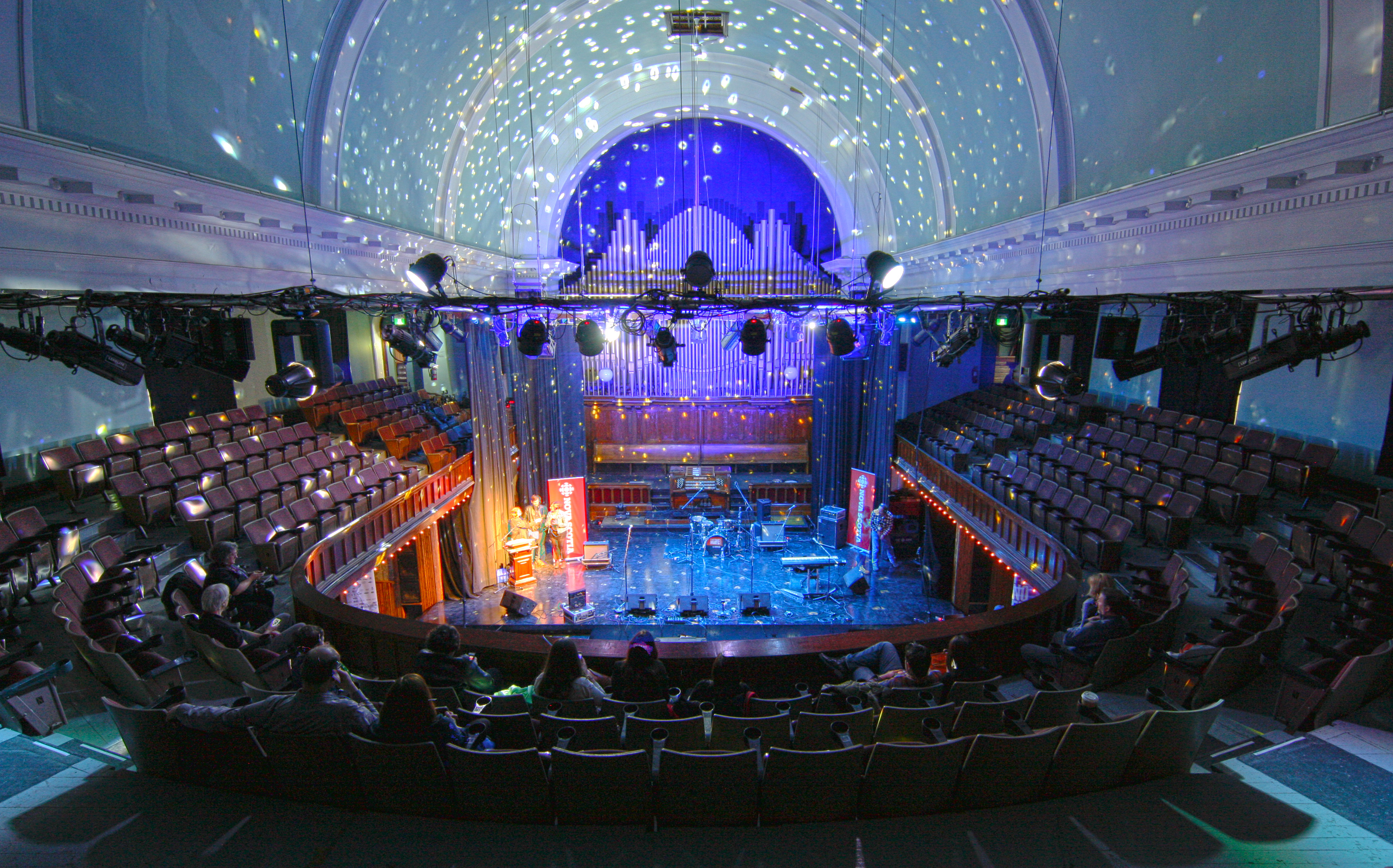
- Highland Arts Theatre during a regional broadcast of CBC's Mainstreet for East Coast Music Week, 2016.
- Interactive map of Highland Arts Theatre
- Former names: St. Andrew's Presbyterian Church (1910–1925), St. Andrew's United Church (1925–2013)
- Address: 40 Bentinck Street
- Location: Sydney, Nova Scotia, Canada
- Coordinates: 46.138782°N 60.194000°W
- Owner: Highland Quality Productions Incorporated
- Operator: Highland Arts Theatre Association
- Seating type: Soft seat, reserved seating
- Capacity: Theatre: 416; Concerts: up to 475
- Type: Theatre
- Events: live theatre, music, concerts, dance, film
- Production: The Producers
- Public transit: Transit Cape Breton; Routes 1, 5 8, 9, 10, 11, 12, 13

Construction
- Groundbreaking: April 14, 1910
- Built: 1910–1911
- Opened: June 25, 1911
- Renovated: June 3, 2014
- Cost: $62,945 CAD (1911)
- Architects: Samuel G. Curry and William F. Sparling of Toronto (Curry & Sparling)
- General contractor: Rhodes Curry Company

Website
- www.highlandartstheatre.com

Nova Scotia Heritage Property Act
- Official name: St. Andrew's United Church
- Type: Provincial Heritage Property
- Designated: 29 August 29, 2012

Nova Scotia Heritage Property Act
- Official name: St. Andrew's United Church
- Type: Municipal Heritage Property
- Designated: 18 September 2007
- Reference no.: 9326

The Highland Arts Theatre is a historic building, first constructed as a Presbyterian Church, now operating an arts and culture centre in Sydney, Cape Breton Regional Municipality, Nova Scotia, Canada. It was initially constructed as St. Andrew's Presbyterian Church.

In June 2014 St. Andrew's reopened as the Highland Arts Theatre, a live play and film theatre and concert venue located in Sydney's waterfront district.

== History ==
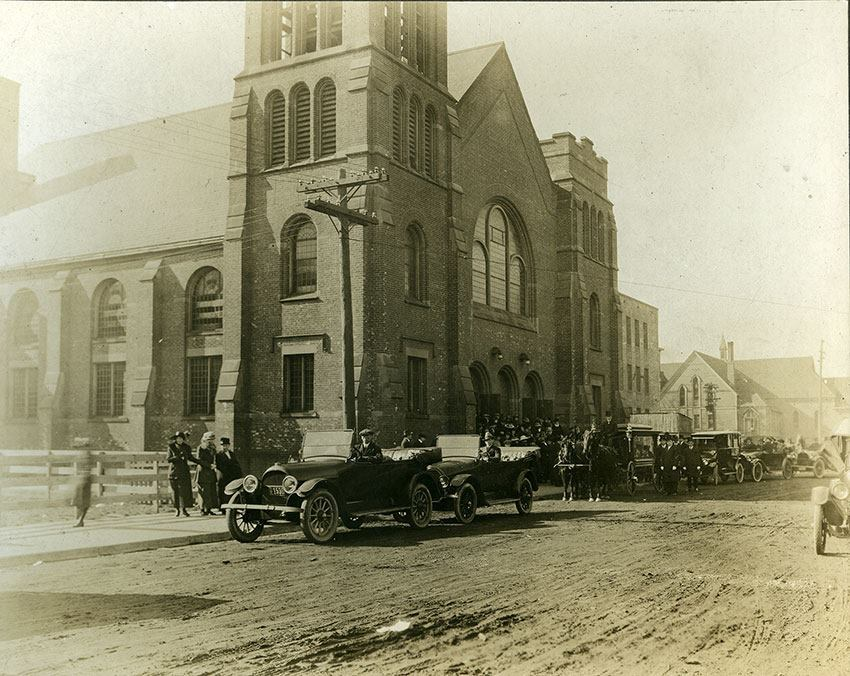
St Andrews ca. 1914, funeral featuring a horse-drawn hearse.

St. Andrew's Presbyterian Church, construction of which started in 1910 and completed in 1911, was the third church built by the Sydney and Mira Presbyterian congregation, originating from 1852. The congregations outgrew the two previous Sydney churches, and so St. Andrew's was built to contain over 1,000 people for services.

In 1925, St. Andrew's Church joined with Methodist and Congregational churches to form the United Church and St. Andrew's then became St. Andrew's United Church. This was a dramatic change for some members of the congregation and many members were lost, however new were gained. St. Andrew's United Church continued as a church with full-time clergy until 2013 when it was decommissioned after the dwindling congregation decided the heating bills for the 104-year-old sanctuary were too expensive. On Wednesday, July 31, 2013, the congregation of St. Andrew's United Church gathered for the Decommissioning Service as the chimes played a call to worship for one final time.

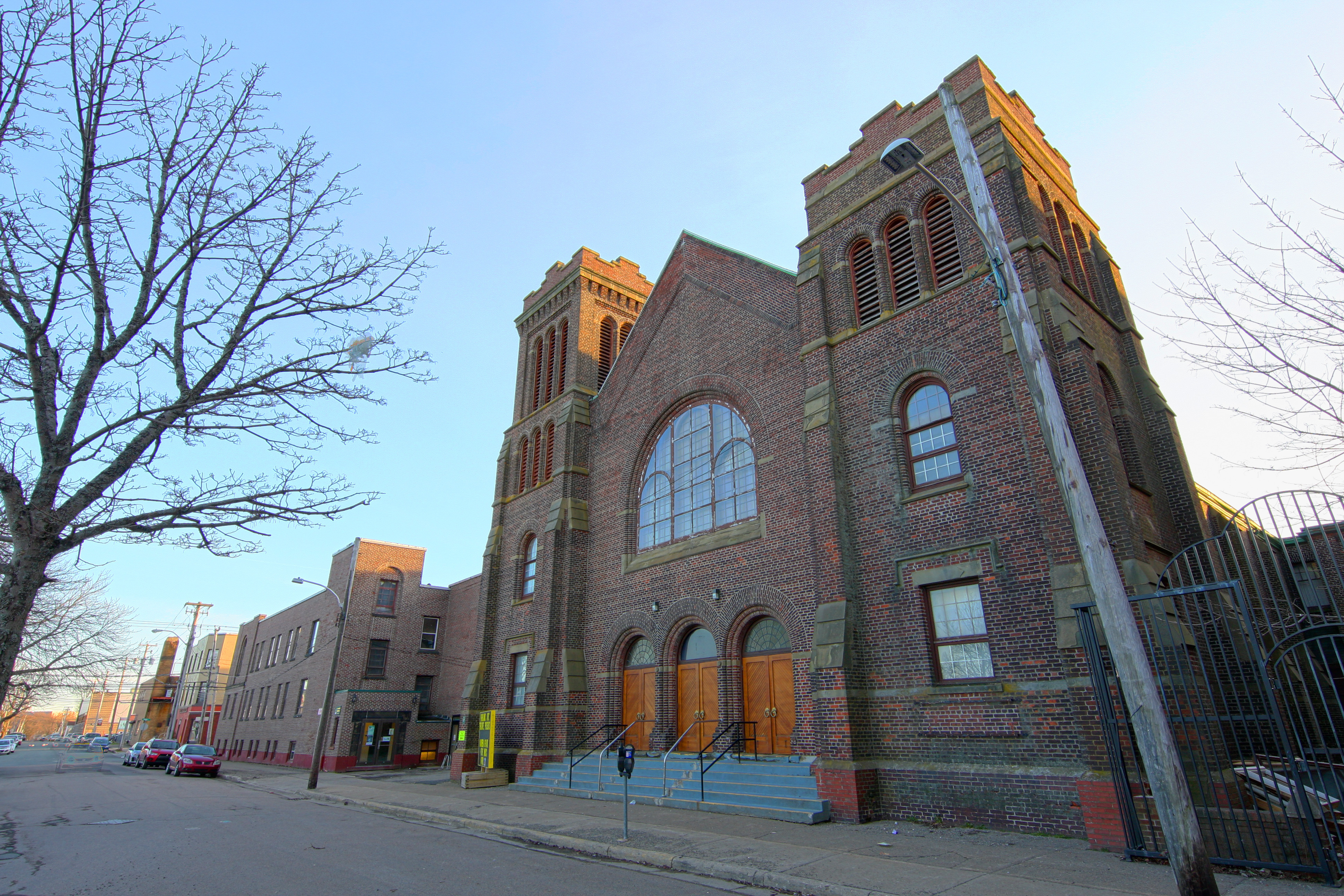
The Highland Arts Theatre

== Architecture ==
At the time of planning and construction, pastor Rev. Dr. John Pringle, D.D. travelled to Toronto and met with architects Curry and Sparling to develop the plans for the church. The contract for construction of the building on Bentinck St. was awarded to Rhodes and Curry Company at a cost of $41,635, and when fully completed was $62,945. This structure was built using red brick from Mira, a local brickyard. Architecturally, the end result was a beautiful house of worship, with impressive towers, bells chiming on days of worship and the steadfast permanence of the Gothic Revival style, rare within the Cape Breton Regional Municipality.

Some of the Character-defining elements of St. Andrew's / Highland Arts Theatre relate to its Gothic Revival style and include its buttressed belfry towers of differing heights, the arched windows, dentil moulding and cornice on the belfry towers, the three-over-three arched windows in upper belfry of taller tower, the three arched windows in upper belfry of lower tower, the wide entry staircase leading to the three arched entries containing two wooden doors each, a large Palladian derivative window above entry. Other character-defining elements are its construction of locally made brick, all original interior elements including: Casavant Frères pipe organ, railings, columns, trim and barrel vaulted ceiling arcing 44 feet (13 m) above the theatre floor; ten bells, inscribed with Biblical verses in bell tower.

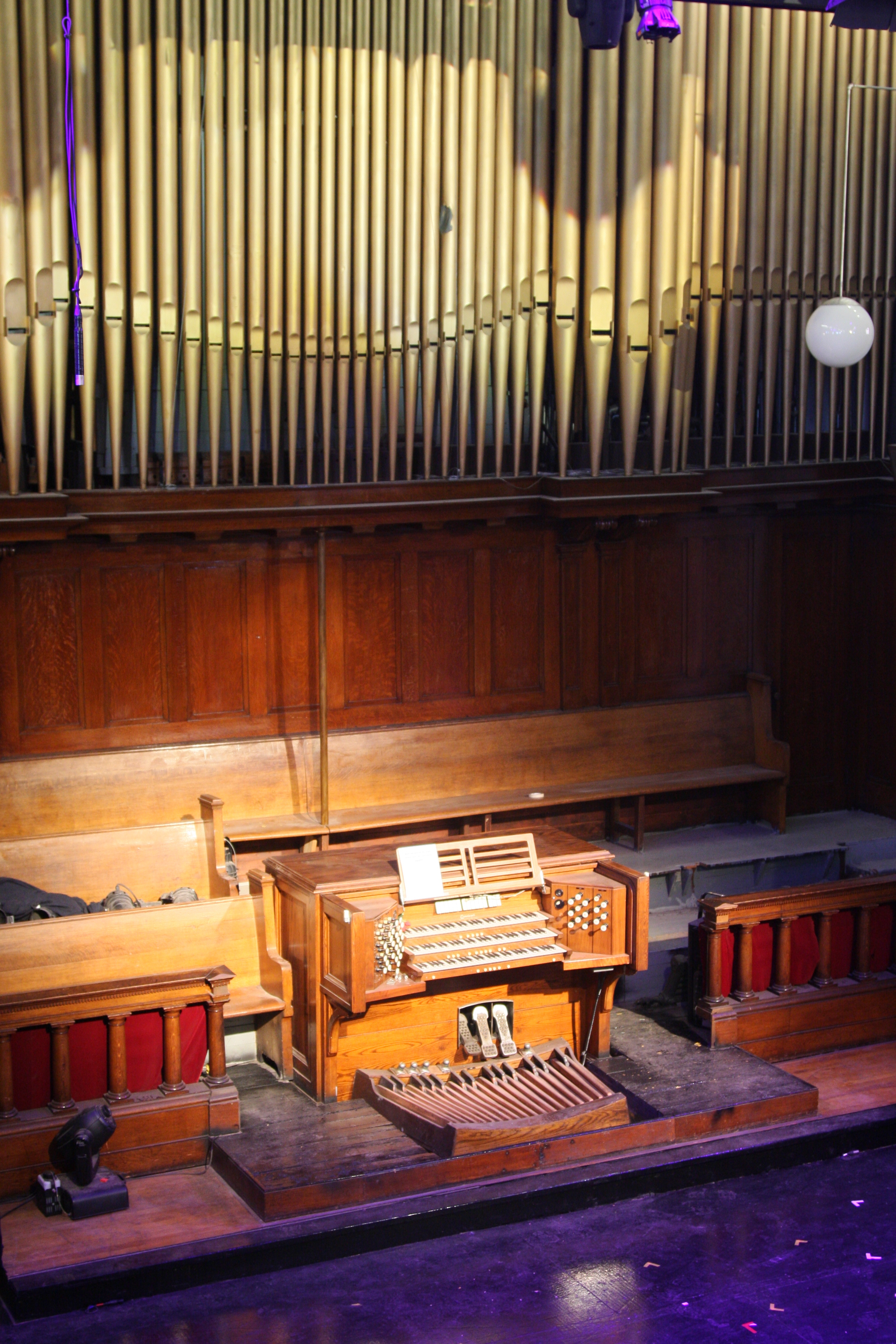
Highland Arts Theatre Casavant Frères Organ

=== Casavant Frères Pipe Organ ===
The 2,045 pipe, three-manual pipe organ made by the famous Casavant Frères in Quebec is the largest such instrument on Cape Breton Island. Its facade, casing, pipes, swell and chorus boxes completely fill the apse of the theatre. The organ was purchased for the new church, then under construction, in 1911 for $5,595 as Casavant Brothers, Ltd., Opus 452. The original specification was for three manuals, 4 divisions, 29 stops, 27 registers, 29 ranks, 1843 pipes. A Stoplist for the 1911 instrument copied from the factory specifications for Casavant Op. 452 1911 3/29, courtesy of the Casavant Frères Archives, St. Hyacinthe, Québec, Canada is available by following this link: Original Stoplist

The organ was rebuilt in 1946 by Casavant Frères Ltée. as Op. 1841, with 3 new Choir stops, a traditional style console with roll top, three manuals, 4 divisions, 33 stops, 30 registers, 32 ranks, 2045 pipes. Manual compass is 61 notes, pedal compass is 32 notes. Equipped with electro-pneumatic (EP) chests, drawknobs in vertical rows on angled jambs, balanced swell shoes/pedals, standard AGO placement, adjustable combination pistons, AGO Standard (concave radiating) pedalboard, reversible full organ/tutti toe stud, combination action thumb pistons, combination action toe studs, coupler reversible thumb pistons, coupler reversible toe studs. Added in 1962 were a Clarion 4' to the Swell and a hooded Harmonic Trumpet, 68 pipes, with new pipework supplied by Casavant via Ledoux & MacDonald Organ Service Co., Halifax. Wind is supplied by a 3 hp electric blower located in the basement directly below the organ.

The following link leads to a Stoplist for the 1946 instrument, copied from the factory specifications for Casavant Frères Ltée., Opus 1841, 1946. Stoplist The 18-ton organ underwent $15,000 in repairs to its bellows in 2008.

=== Chime (Bells) ===
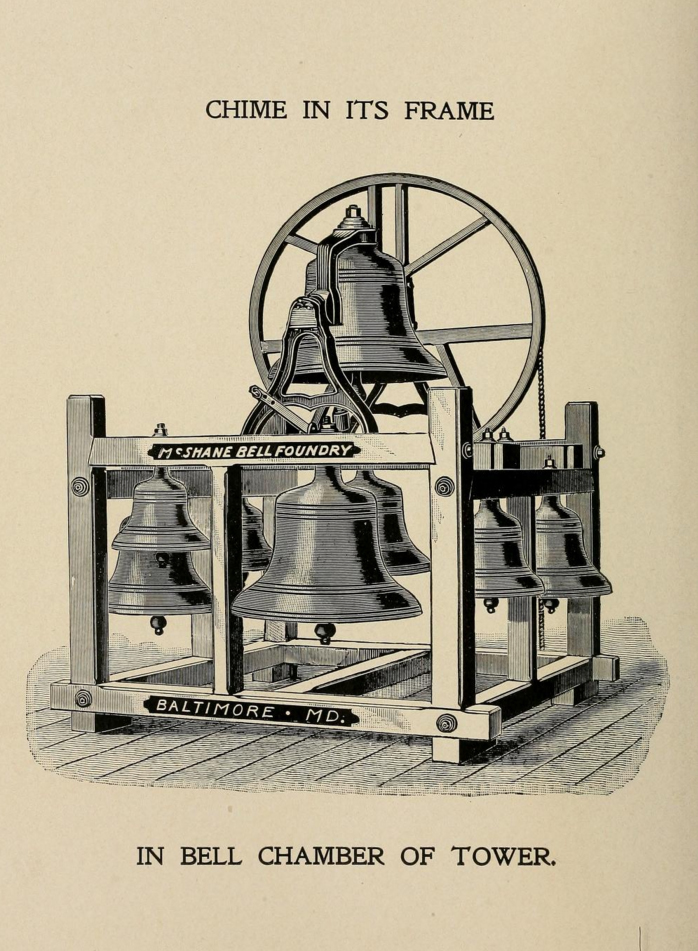
This is the arrangement of a McShane Eight Bell Chime as it would appear in the Bell Chamber of a tower. This is very similar to layout of the Ten Bell Highland Arts Theatre Chime.

The chime, consisting of ten bells located in the south bell tower, is still in use today. The bells were cast in bronze (bell metal) for St. Andrew's Church by the McShane Bell Foundry in Baltimore, Maryland, US and are dated 1911. The bells are arranged as a traditional chime of 10 bells and are played using the original unmodified McShane "pump handle" chimestand with deep key-fall on all notes. Nine of the bells are hung fixed in position in the main chime frame in the belfry, the tenth, the heaviest bell, is mounted in a rotary iron yoke on iron stands above the main chime frame. This bell, the tenor bell, is equipped with both a spring clapper and a tolling hammer so can be played either by swing chiming or by using the chimestand located in the ringing room immediately below the Bell Chamber in the bell tower.

All the bells have the foundry's name cast onto their waist. The nine smaller bells are also decorated with inscriptions, quotes from Psalms from the King James Version of the Bible, cast onto their waist, while the largest bell's inscription reads "St. Andrews Church, Sydney NS". This largest bell weighs about 2,050 lb (930 kg) and its pitch is E in the middle octave. The chime is attuned to concert pitch, to the eight notes of the octave or diatonic scale with two bells added, one bell a semitone, a flat seventh, and one bell, the treble bell, above the octave. This smallest bell, at about 200 lb (91 kg), rings an F♯.

In December 2015 a video posted on Facebook of Sydney native Glenda Watt playing the Christmas carol "Angels We Have Heard on High" on the chime was viewed more than 1.6 million times within the first nine days of it being uploaded to the social networking site.

Follow this link to a page of videos of the chime being played: The Chimes ~ Christmas Music

=== Heritage designations ===
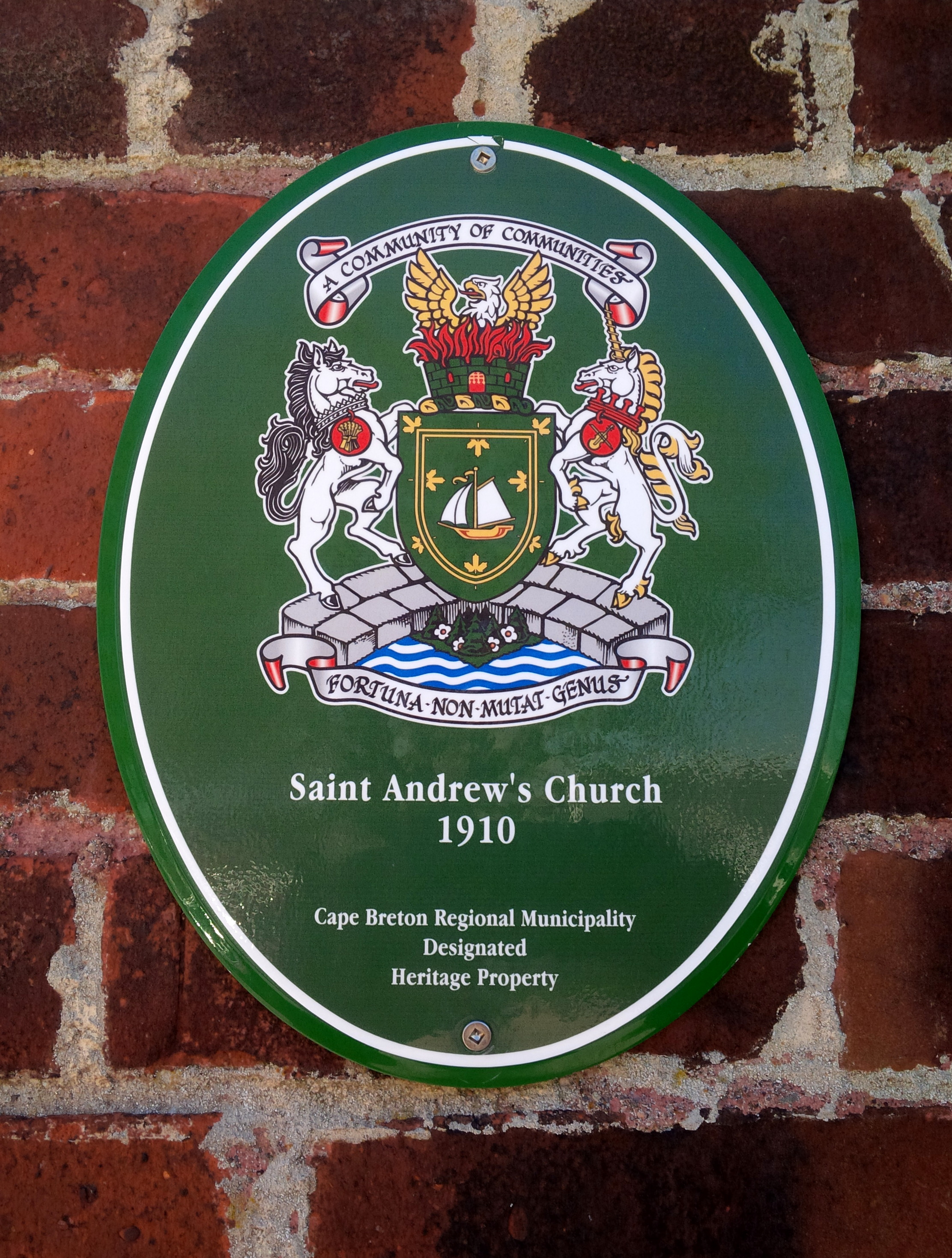
The Highland Arts Theatre is a historic building, first constructed as St. Andrew's Presbyterian Church in 1910/1911.

Municipal Heritage Property: On September 18, 2007, the Cape Breton Regional Municipality formally recognized St. Andrew's United Church as a Municipally Registered Property under the Nova Scotia Heritage Property Act, Chapter 199 of the revised Statutes, 1989, amended 1991, c. 10; 1998, c. 18, s. 561; 2010, c. 54 The Cape Breton Regional Municipality designated St. Andrew's Church and the property it sits on, recognizing St. Andrew's for its early and continuing presence in the community as well as the striking architecture. It is one of the few brick buildings in the area, and is impressive for its size and beauty.

Provincial Heritage Property: On August 29, 2012, the Minister responsible for the Nova Scotia Heritage Property Act entered St. Andrew's United Church into the Provincial Registry of Heritage Property resulting in provincial heritage protection for the theatre.

== Concerts ==
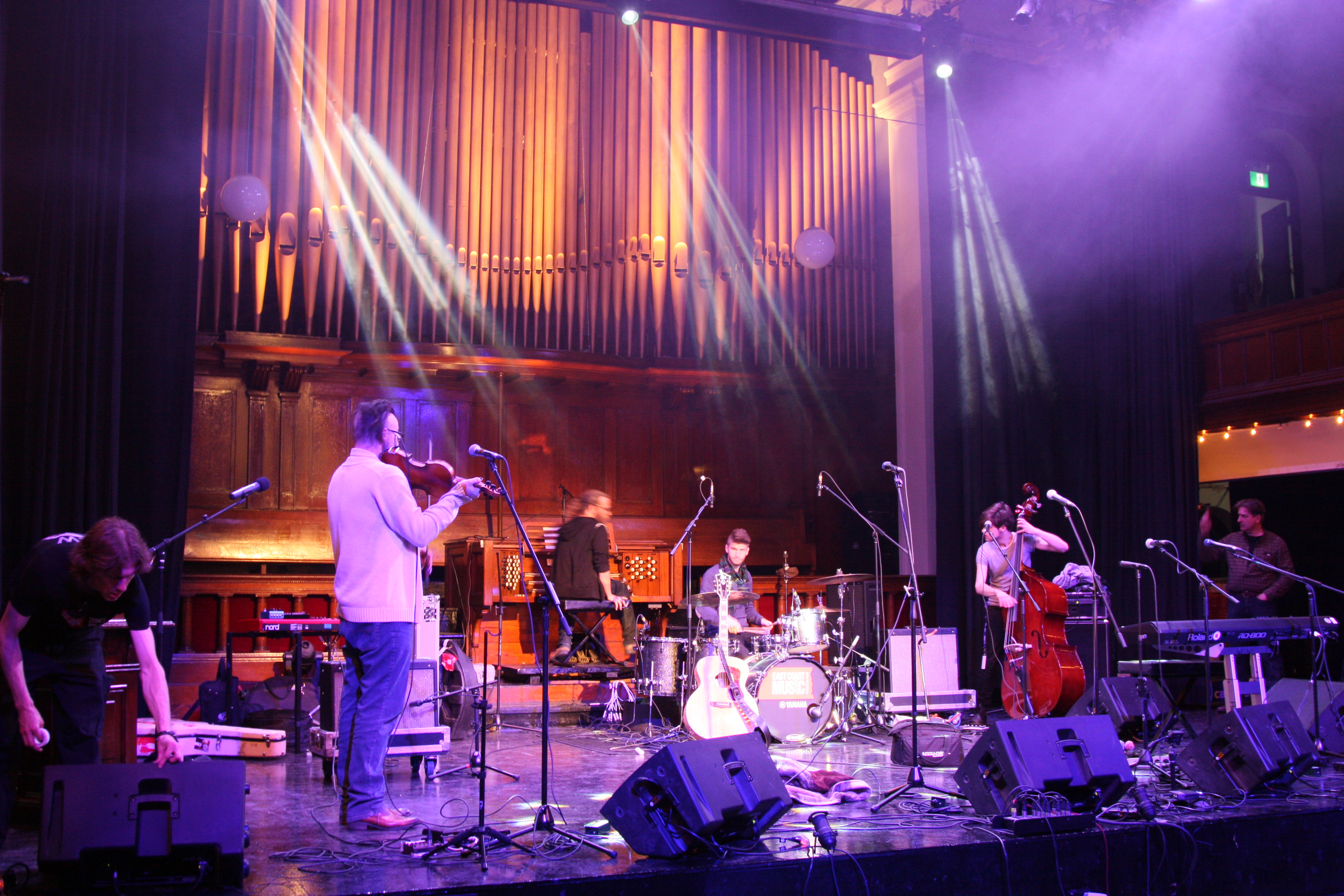
Soundcheck for East Coast Music Week: Folk Stage, featuring Ben Caplan & The Casual Smokers on Friday, April 15, 2016.

While still serving as a church, St. Andrew's was considered to be perhaps the finest concert venue in the city of Sydney. Before its rebirth as an arts centre, the building had a distinguished background as a performance space. Classical musicians regularly held recitals and concerts there over the years because of the building's outstanding acoustical properties and its Casavant Freres organ. In the mid 1950s St. Andrew's was a regular stop for one of the incarnations of the Halifax Symphony Orchestra whose performances at St. Andrew's were broadcast regionally and even nationally by CBC Radio. Thomas Mayer was the conductor. He would often invite local performers to join them, at the time there were several operatic sopranos and mezzo-sopranos from Cape Breton who gained a national following because of these broadcasts. More recently, due to its seating capacity of over 1,000, and excellent acoustics it was sought after by organizations such as Celtic Colours, The Barra MacNeils, and the Cape Breton Chorale.

Since reopening as the Highland Arts Theatre many concerts have been presented.

The following are some of the artists that have performed at The HAT :

- Karan Casey
- CBC Mainstreet Cape Breton - LIVE BROADCAST to the Atlantic Region
- Cherish the Ladies
- J. P. Cormier
- East Coast Music Week: Folk Stage, featuring Ben Caplan & The Casual Smokers, Kim Harris, Quiet Parade, and Jordan Musycsyn
- East Coast Music Week: Classical Showcase, featuring Peter-Anthony Togni, Tristan De Borba, Simon Docking, Saint John String Quartet, Members of Symphony Nova Scotia, Martin Kutnowski, Jeff Reilly, Dinuk Wijeratne, and Derek Charke
- East Coast Music Week: Bluebird North, featuring Tristan Horncastle, Steve Maloney and the Wandering Kind, Kim Harris, Keith Mullins, Tomato/Tomato, Norma MacDonald, Kat McLevey, Dylan Menzie, Dave Sampson, and Ian Sherwood
- East Coast Music Week: Warner Music Roots Room, featuring J. P. Cormier, Chrissy Crowley, fr:Danny Boudreau, Jordie Lane, and Ken Tizzard
- Lennie Gallant
- Terry Kelly
- The Lemon Bucket Orkestra
- Old Man Luedecke
- Lúnasa
- Makem and Spain
- John McDermott
- Murray McLauchlan
- Heather Rankin

== Live theatre ==
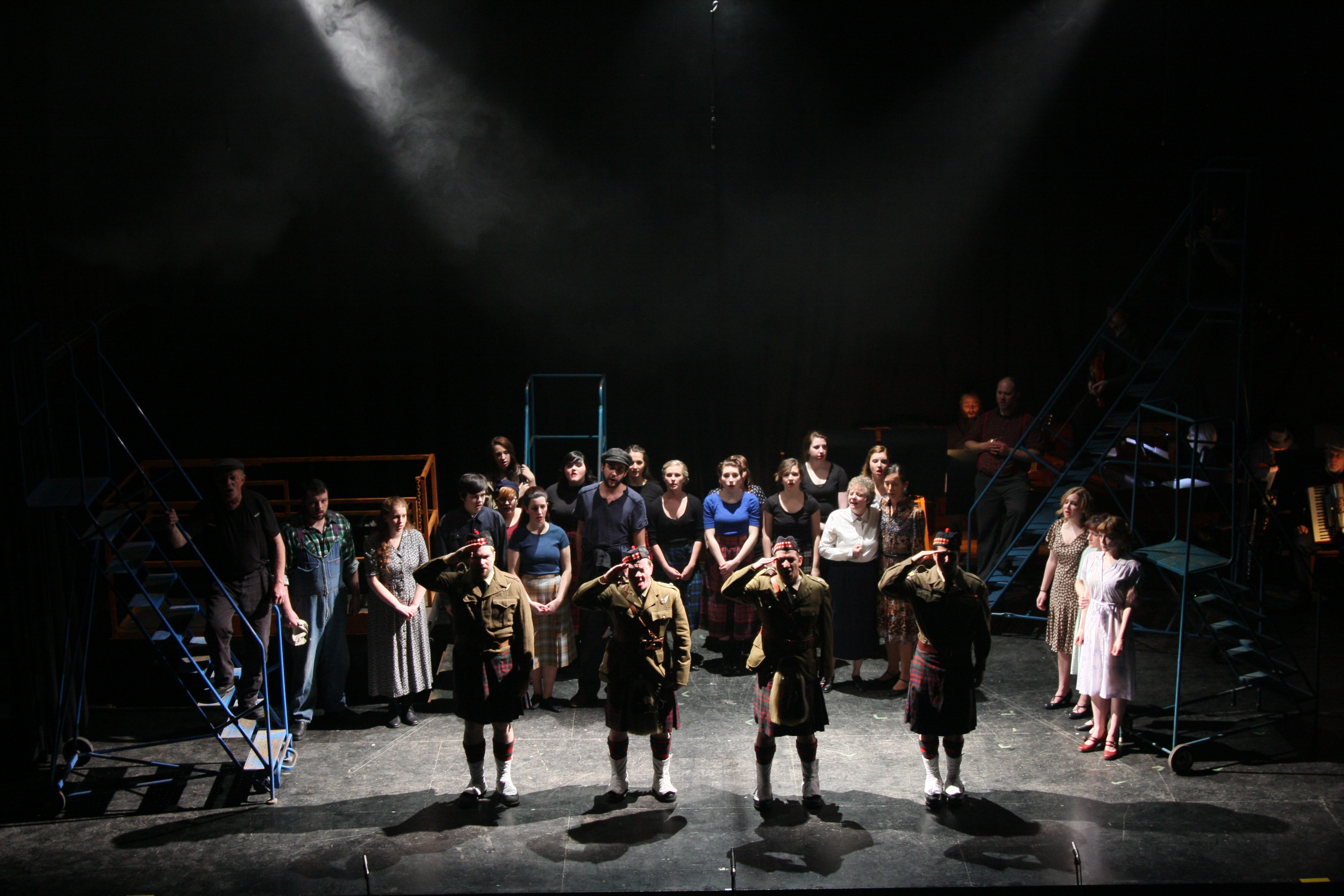
HEART OF STEEL a new musical by Wesley J. Colford, a production of the Highland Arts Theatre.

Highland Arts Theatre, or "The HAT" as it is affectionately called, is the name of the newly renovated St. Andrew's Church. When the church was decommissioned in 2013, local musician and businessman Kevin Colford stepped up to instigate a transformation of the beloved historical building into a state of the art centre for arts and culture. The venue officially re-opened on Tuesday, June 3, 2014 with an original musical comedy, "The Wakowski Brothers - A Cape Breton Vaudeville".

Sound and lighting were all upgraded, with new mixing consoles, sound reinforcement systems, lighting grid, lighting control console, dimmers, and intelligent lighting installed. The pews were replaced with 475 stadium-style theatre seats, converting the space to a "soft seater". A large re-enforced stage was constructed and a flexible stage curtaining system, projection screen, and video projectors were installed. The three large Dressing / Green Rooms were upgraded, a Grand Piano was brought in and the fully functioning Pipe Organ was serviced. Renovations have thus far been for function only — the natural aesthetic and acoustics remain intact.

While the venue is available for rent the theatre has begun to host many of Cape Breton's finest in the fields of music, dance, and entertainment. The management's intention is to create a reliable theatrical presence downtown, producing quality productions with a special emphasis on Cape Breton songs and stories. The Highland Arts Theatre is now actively used for concerts, lectures, weddings, and of course performances of any kind.

A Fall and a Winter/Spring season of plays are offered each year as well as a Summer Repertory theatre season.

=== Past productions ===
The following is a list of theatrical plays and musicals performed since reopening as The HAT :

2014:

- The Wakowski Brothers - A Cape Breton Vaudeville, Book, Music, Lyrics, & Direction by Wesley J. Colford
- The Lieutenant of Inishmore, by Martin McDonagh, Directed by Kristen Gregor
- A Christmas Carol, by Charles Dickens, Adapted and Directed by Wesley J. Colford, Music Direction by Barb Stetter, Choreography by Cynthia Vokey

2015:

- Shit Song for Some Island, Written and Directed by Kyle Capstick
- Theatre Brouhaha's Punch Up, by Kat Sandler, Directed by Kristen Gregor
- Heart of Steel, Book, Music, & Lyrics by Wesley J. Colford, Music Direction by Barb Stetter, Choreography by Cynthia Vokey
- Zadie's Shoes, by Adam Pettle, Directed by Sarah Blanchard
- First Time Last Time, Written and Directed by Scott Sharplin
- Heart of Steel (re-mount), Book, Music, & Lyrics by Wesley J. Colford, Music Direction by Barb Stetter, Choreography by Cynthia Vokey
- Mature Young Adults, by Wesley J. Colford, Directed by Anna Spencer
- No Great Mischief, by Alistair MacLeod, Adapted for stage by Davis S. Young, Directed by Todd Hiscock
- The True Meaning of Cape Breton, by James FW Thompson, Directed by Wesley J. Colford
- Alice in Wonderland, Adapted and Directed by James FW Thompson
- Black Jack, by Jason Burke, Walter Carey, James FW Thompson, and Jenn Tubrett, Directed by Jenn Tubrett, James FW Thompson, Erin Thompson, Jason Burke, and Mary-Jean Doyle
- Communion, by Daniel MacIvor, Directed by Sarah Blanchard
- A Christmas Carol (re-mount), by Charles Dickens, Adapted and Directed by Wesley J. Colford, Music Direction by Barb Stetter, Choreography by Cynthia Vokey

2016:

- The Wakowski Brothers - A Cape Breton Vaudeville (re-mount), Book, Music, Lyrics, & Direction by Wesley J. Colford
- All in the Timing, by David Ives, Directed by Tom McGee
- Dream - A 1950's Midsummer Musical, Adapted and Directed by Wesley J. Colford, Assistant Direction by Hilary Scott, Music Direction by Barb Stetter, Choreography by Cynthia Vokey
- Extinction Song, Written and Directed by Ron Jenkins, starring Ron Pederson
- Herstory, Book, Music, Lyrics, & Direction by Lindsay Thompson, Music Direction by Barb Stetter, Choreography by Cynthia Vokey
- Dream - A '50's Midsummer Musical - Encore Production, Adapted and Directed by Wesley J. Colford, Assistant Direction by Hilary Scott, Music Direction by Barb Stetter, Choreography by Cynthia Vokey
- I Love You, You're Perfect, Now Change, Book and Lyrics by Joe DiPietro, Music by Jimmy Roberts, Directed by Marc Richard, Music Directed by Chris Mounteer
- Kitchen Party, Written and Directed by Wesley J. Colford, with additional writing by The Ensemble, Music Direction by Chris Mounteer, Choreography by Courtney Fiddis & Cynthia Vokey
- Halo, Written by Josh MacDonald, Directed by Todd Hiscock, Music Direction by Ken Chisholm
- Sucker, Written by Kat Sandler, Directed by Ron Jenkins
- Vigil, by Morris Panych, November 9 to 13.
- A Christmas Carol (re-mount), by Charles Dickens, Adapted and Directed by Wesley J. Colford, Music Direction by Barb Stetter, Choreography by Cynthia Vokey, November 28 to December 2.
- Holiday on Christmas Island, a new musical by Wesley J. Colford, December 14 to 18.

2017 Winter-Spring Season:

- Morro & Jasp Do Puberty, by Amy Lee, Heather Marie Annis & Byron Laviolette, January 9 to 13
- Criminals in Love, by George F. Walker, February 6 to 10
- Return of the Cape Breton Liberation Army, a new musical by Wesley J. Coldford, March 22 to 30
- The (Curious Case of the) Watson Intelligence, by Madeline George, April 19 to 23
- Next to Normal, Music by Tom Kitt, Book and lyrics by Brian Yorkey, May 17 to 21
- 2017 HAT-A-Versary Variety Spectacular, June 10

2017 Summer Repertory Season:

- Marion Bridge by Daniel MacIvor, Directed by Todd Hiscock, Thursday Nights, July 6, 13, 20, 27, August 3
- Tribe of One, by Michael McPhee, Directed by Tayves Fiddis, Friday Nights, July 7, 14, 21, 28, August 4, 11
- The 25th Annual Putnam County Spelling Bee, Music and Lyrics by William Finn, Book by Rachel Sheinkin, Directed by Ron Jenkins, Music Direction by Chris Mounteer, Saturday Nights, July 8, 15, 22, 29, August 5, 12
- DREAM - A 1950s Midsummer Musical, 2017 Remount, Adapted and Directed by Wesley J. Colford, Music Direction by Barb Stetter, Choreography by Cynthia Vokey, Assistant Direction by Hilary Scott, Sunday Nights, July 9, 16, 23, 39, August 6, 13

The 2017 Fall Season:

- Three Men In A Boat, Based on the novel by Jerome K. Jerome, Adapted by Mark Brownell, Directed by Sue Miner, Sept 27 - Oct 1
- Theatre Brouhaha's Punch Up, by Kat Sandler, Directed by Kristen Gregor, Oct 25 - 29
- She Loves Me, Book by Joe Masteroff, Lyrics by Sheldon Harnick & Music by Jerry Bock, Directed by Wesley J. Colford, Music Directed by Barb Stetter, Nov 22 - 26
- A Christmas Carol 2017, Written by Charles Dickens, Adapted & Directed by Wesley J. Colford, Music Directed by Barb Stetter, Choreography by Cynthia Vokey, December 13 –17

The 2018 Winter-Spring Season:

- Of Mice, Morrow & Jasp, Created and Performed by Amy Lee and Heather Marie Annis, Direction & Dramaturgy by Byron Laviolette, January 16 to 20
- The Glass Menagerie, by Tennessee Williams, Directed by Mark Delaney, February 6 to 10
- Disco Nights, A new musical by Wesley J. Colford, Choreography by Cynthia Vokey, March 13 to 18, 20, 21
- The Penelopiad, by Margaret Atwood, Directed by Birdie Gregor, Choreography by Thomas L. Colford, April 17 to 22
- The Happy Prince, Book, Music, & Lyrics by Leslie Arden, Based on the story by Oscar Wilde, Directed by Ron Jenkins, May 15 to 20
- Tribute to the Rotary Show, a new new star-studded revue, June 5 to 10

HAT 2018 Summer Season:

- The 25th Annual Putnam County Spelling Bee - Encore, a Tony-Award winning musical comedy straight from Broadway! 8:00 pm every Tuesday, July 10, 17, 24, 31 & Aug. 7, 14, 21
- Disco Nights - Encore, a pulsating, gyrating, full-on comedy of the highest order. 8:00 pm every Wednesday, July 11, 18, 25 & Aug. 1, 8, 15, 22
- Kitchen Party - Encore, this musical collage celebrates the unique history of Canadas East Coast, contrasted with new voices sharing tales of the contemporary East Coast lifestyle, 8:00 pm every Thursday, July 12, 19, 26 & Aug. 2, 9, 16, 23
- Heart of Steel- 2018 Encore, for 50 years, the Sydney Steel Plant produced the finest steel in the world. But when War breaks out and the men are gone overseas, what will happen when women take change of the workplace for the first time? 8:00 pm every Friday, July 13, 20, 27 & Aug. 3, 10, 17, 24

HAT 2018 Fall Season:

- Mary's Wedding, by Stephen Massicotte. Directed by Ron Jenkins. On the night before her wedding, Mary dreams of a thunderstorm, during which she unexpectedly meets Charlie sheltering in a barn beside his horse. But the year is 1914, and the world is collapsing into a brutal war. Sept 20 to 23 at 8:00 pm
- West Moon, by Al Pittman. Directed by Sarah Blanchard. Once a year, on All Souls Night, the occupants of a small Newfoundland graveyard are given the gift of speech and the ability to once again gossip with their ghostly neighbours. The fisherman, the shop keep, and the busy-body all have their usual complaints but rumours of resettlement lurk in the shadows and the haunting are about to become the haunted... Oct 24 to 28 at 8:00 pm
- She Loves Me - Encore, Book by Joe Masteroff, Lyrics by Sheldon Harnick & Music by Jerry Bock, Directed by Wesley J. Colford, Music Directed by Barb Stetter, Nov 21 - 25 at 8:00 pm
- A Christmas Carol 2018 Written by Charles Dickens. Adapted & Directed by Wesley J. Colford. Music Directed by Barb Stetter. Choreography by Cynthia Vokey. December 12 – 16 at 8:00 pm

HAT 2019 Winter-Spring Season:

- Good Animals, by Scott Sharplin Directed by Michael McPhee, featuring: Mark Delaney, Amy Fedora, Andy Gouthro, & Hilary Scott. January 8–13
- The Glace Bay Miners' Museum, by Wendy Lill Adapted from the novel by Sheldon Currie Directed by Ron Jenkins. February 19 - 24
- See Jane Run, a new musical by L. M. Thompson, Book & Lyrics by Lindsay Thompson Music by Suzanne Doane Directed by Alison Crosby Choreography by Thomas L. Colford. March 12–17
- Bunny, by Hannah Moscovitch Directed by Richie Wilcox. A professor of Victorian Literature is confronted by the ghosts of her own sexuality in this dangerous and disorienting play about repressive social convention, personal inhibition and desire unleashed. It's a romance. It's sexy. Not always at the same time. April 9–14
- The Drowsy Chaperone, Book by Bob Martin & Don McKellar Music & Lyrics by Lisa Lambert & Greg Morrison Directed by Wesley J. Colford. May 14 - 19
- The 5 Year Hat-A-Versary Spectacular!

HAT 2019 Summer Season:

- Return of the Cape Breton Liberation Army, a new musical by Wesley J. Coldford, 8:00 pm every Thursday, July 11, 18, 25 & Aug. 1, 8, 15, 22
- S' Wonderful, The Music of George Gershwin, Music Director Chris Mounteer, 8:00 pm every Friday, July 12, 19, 26 & Aug. 2, 9, 16, 23
- I Love You, You're Perfect, Now Change, Book and Lyrics by Joe DiPietro, Music by Jimmy Roberts, Directed by Marc Richard, Music Directed by Chris Mounteer, 8:00 pm every Saturday, July 13, 20, 27 & Aug. 3, 10, 17, 24

HAT 2019 Fall Season:

- Silence, by Trina Davies, Directed by Ron Jenkins, September 17 to 22 at 8:00 pm
- Little Shop of Horrors, Book & Lyrics by Howard Ashman, Music by Alan Menkin, Directed by Ron Jenkins, Music Directed by Barbara Stetter, Choreography by Cynthia Vokey, October 29 to November 3 at 8:00 PM
- The Best Brothers, by Daniel MacIvor, November 19 to 24 at 8:00 pm
- A Christmas Carol 2019, by Charles Dickens, Adapted & Directed by Wesley J. Colford, Music Directed by Barb Stetter, Choreography by Cynthia Vokey, December 10–15 at 8:00 pm

=== Current production ===
HAT 2020 Winter-Spring Season:

- The Drawer Boy, by Michael Healey. Directed by Ron Jenkins, Tuesday 14 January 2020 to Sunday 19 January 2020

=== Upcoming productions ===
- Morro and Jasp: Save the Date, created by Heather Marie Annis and Amy Lee. Tuesday 18 February 2020 to Sunday 23 February 2020
- As You Like It, adapted by Wesley J. Colford. Tuesday 10 March 2020 to Sunday 15 March 2020
- A Public Reading of an Unproduced Screenplay About the Death of Walt Disney, by Lucas Hyath, Tuesday 14 April 2020 to Sunday 19 April 2020
- The Clockmaker, by Stephen Massicotte. Tuesday 12 May 2020 to Sunday 17 May 2020
- Tribute to the Rotary Show, a new new star-studded revue, Tuesday 2 June 2020 to Sunday 7 June 2020

== Film ==
Film at the Highland Arts Theatre debuted in December 2014 with three afternoon matinees and three evening showings of six black-and-white movies from the 1930s through to the 1950s. This was followed up on November 11, 2015, with a Free Screening of New Short Films from Atlantic Canada, courtesy of the Atlantic Filmmakers Cooperative. Films shown were:

- The Canoe, Alex Balkam, 8 mins, experimental
- Some Things Won't Sleep, Leah Johnston, 11 mins, drama
- ALIA, Raghed Charabaty, 5 mins, drama
- A Horse Throat, Jenna Marks & David Barlow-Krelina, 2 mins, animation
- Cabinet of Wonders, Jim MacSwain, 10 mins, animation
- What You Did Before You Were Born, Ariella Pahlke, 22 mins, documentary

Top Hat Pictures, a subsidiary of Highland Arts Theatre, officially launched in January 2016, concentrating on newly released Canadian and internationally acclaimed films not available at other venues. Screenings using The HAT's Barco 30,000 lumen, 2K three-chip DLP digital cinema projector occurred on Mondays at 7 pm., monthly. The premiere showing was Trumbo (2015) on Monday, January 25, 2016.

The following is a list of films previously shown at The HAT :

- Trumbo (2015)
- Al Purdy Was Here (2015)
- Brooklyn (2015)
- Carol (2015)
- Spotlight (2015) - Academy Awards winner, Best Picture and Best Original Screenplay.
- The Princess Bride (1987)

=== Upcoming screenings ===
Movie Musical Sing-along Series

- Mamma Mia!, 15 February 2020
- Jesus Christ Superstar, 11 April 2020
- Oklahoma!, 13 June 2020
- Hairspray, 8 August 2020
- Little Shop of Horrors, 24 October 2020
- White Christmas, 19 December 2020

Other films

- I Am Skylar, 26 January 2020, written and directed by Rachale Bowers. 15 min. (Official Selection 2019 FIN Atlantic International Film Festival),
- The Body Remembers When the World Broke Open, 6 February 2020

== Box office ==
The Highland Arts Theatre's Box Office is located at the side door of the Theatre at 40 Bentinck Street.

== Gallery ==
Highland Arts Theatre 2,045 pipe, three-manual Casavant Frères Pipe Organ
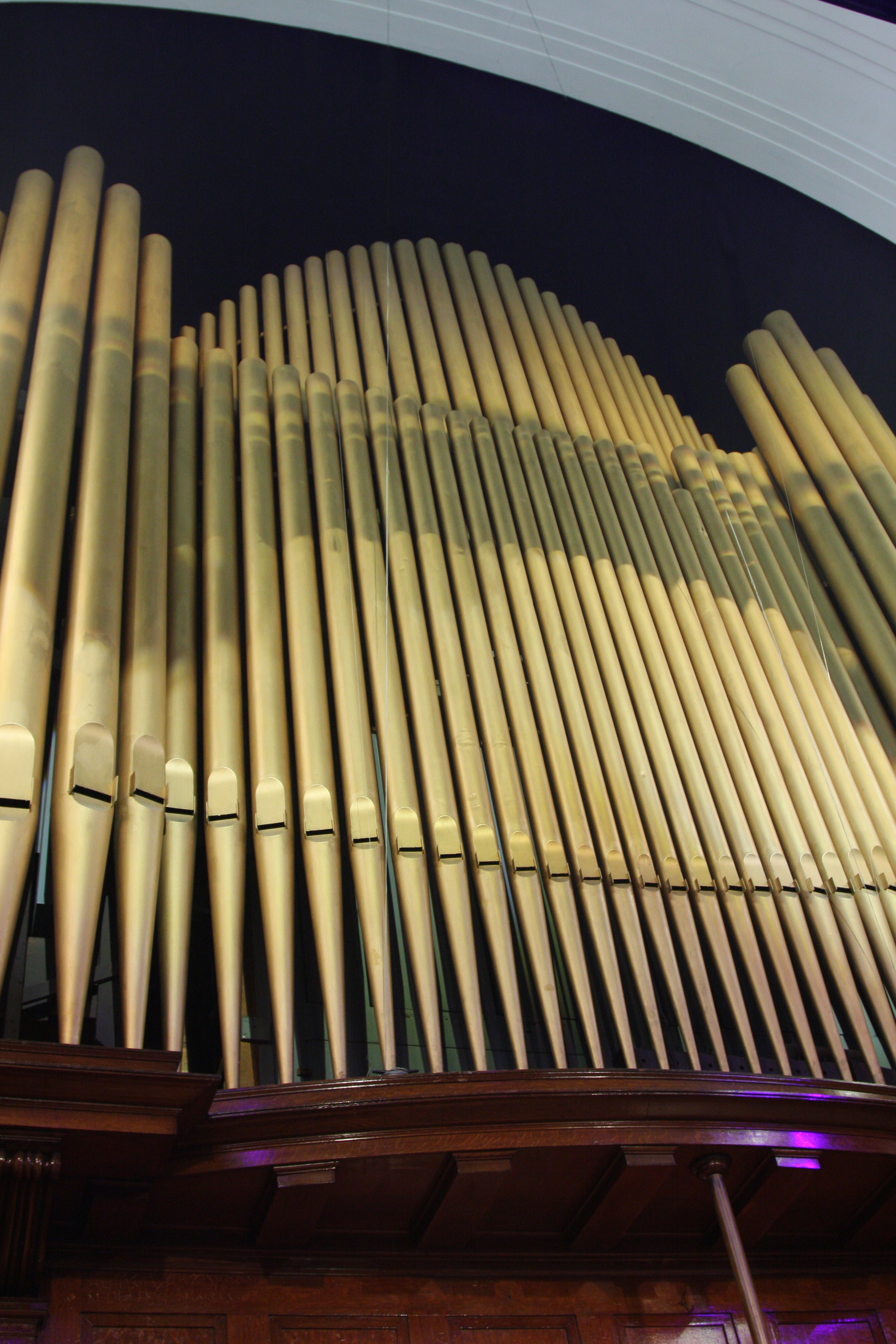
Highland Arts Theatre Casavant Frères Organ - view of the rank of metal pipes that make up the visible face of the organ.

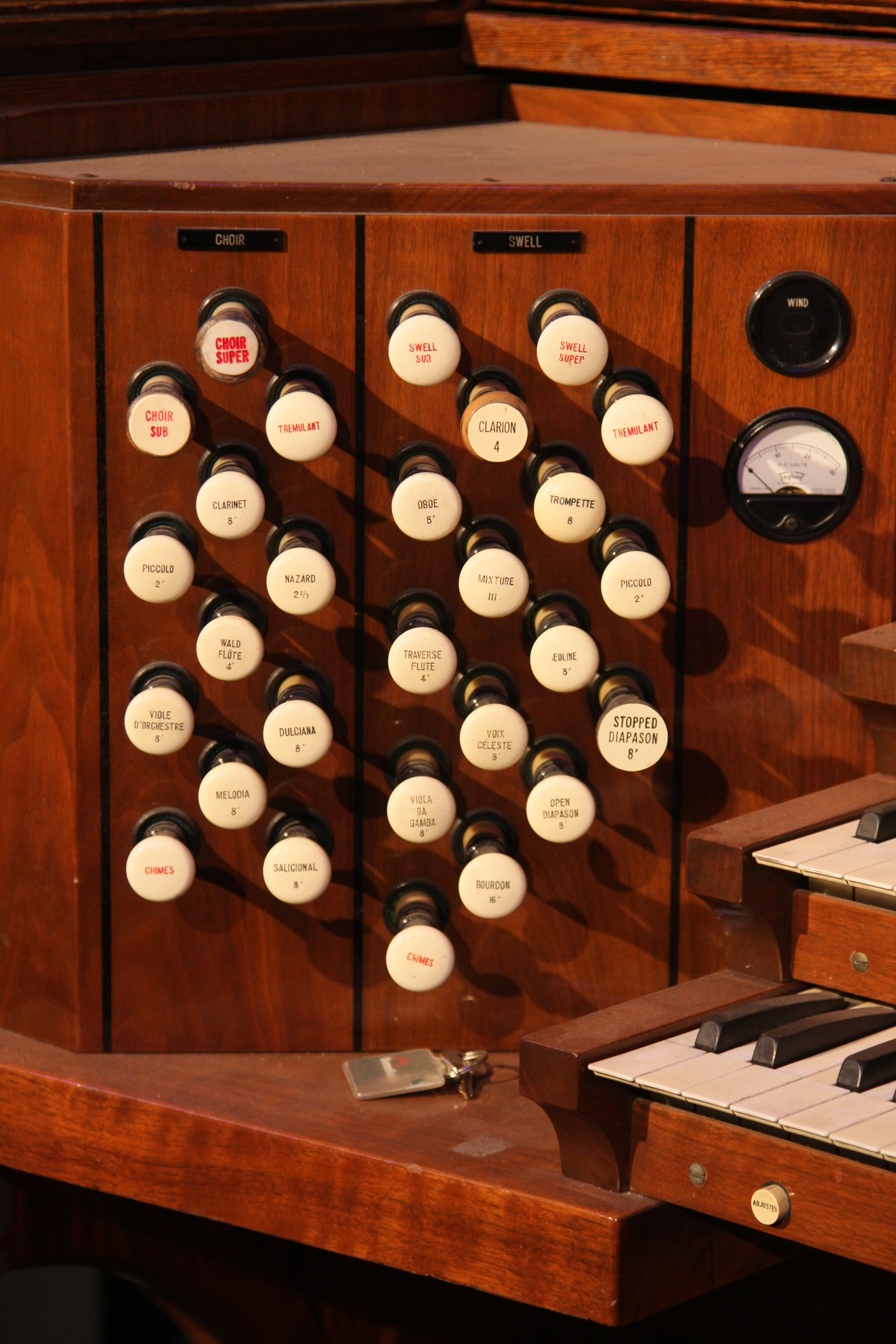
Highland Arts Theatre Casavant Frères Organ - view of the Choir and Swell Stops to the left of the manuals.

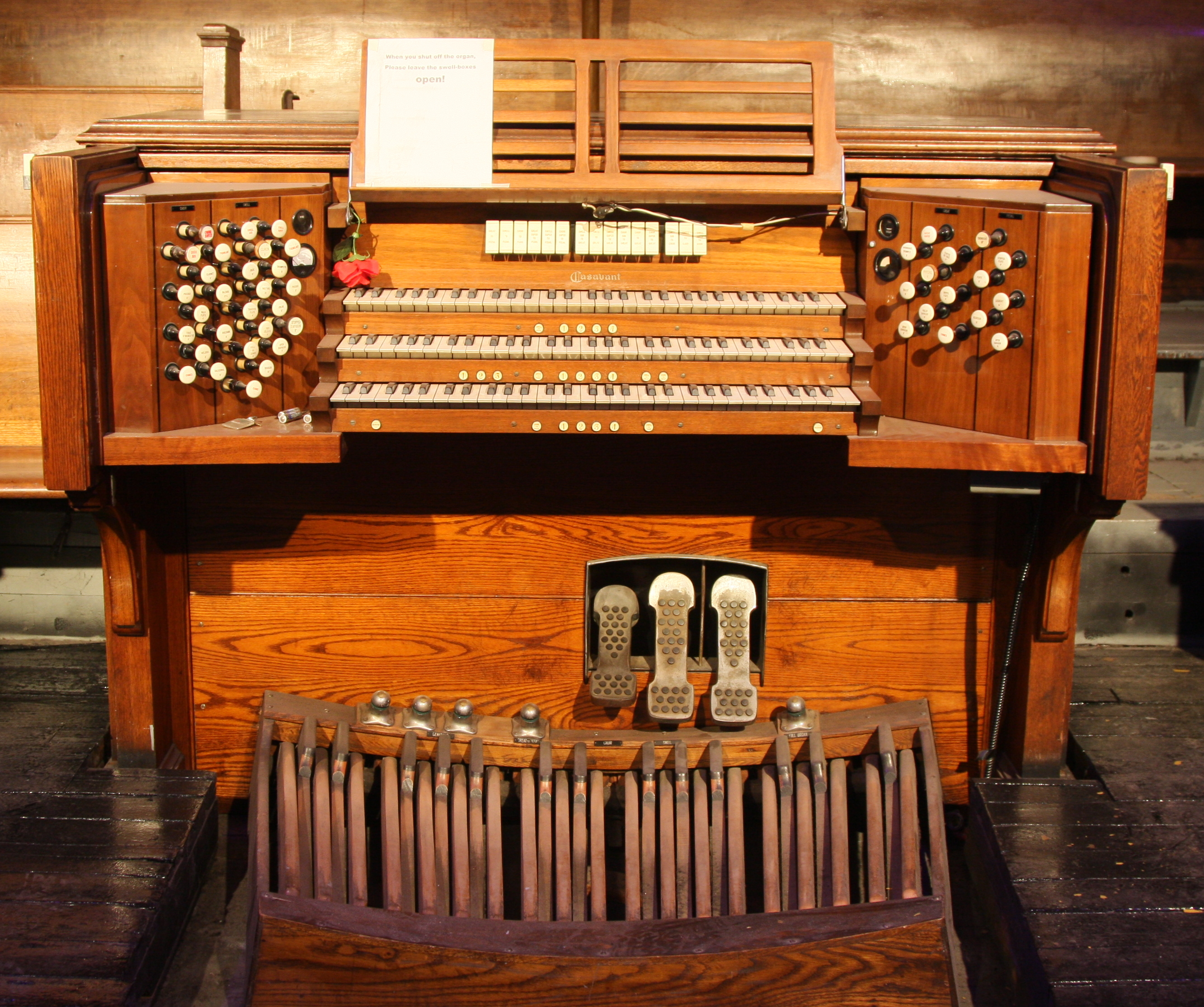
Highland Arts Theatre Casavant Frères Organ - view of the Console, showing the Stops, the three Manuals, and the Pedals.

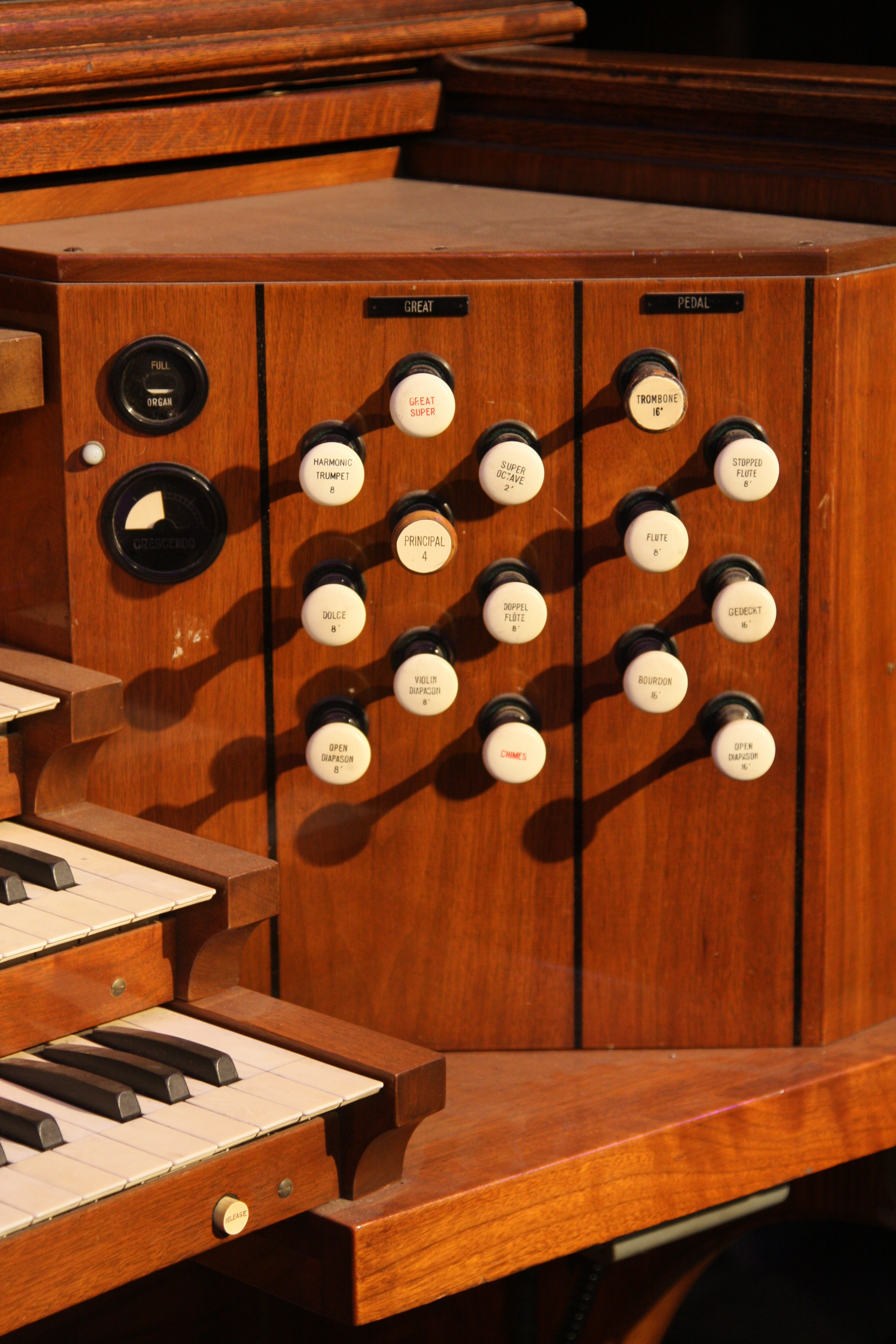
Highland Arts Theatre Casavant Frères Organ - view of the Great and Pedal Stops to the right of the manuals.

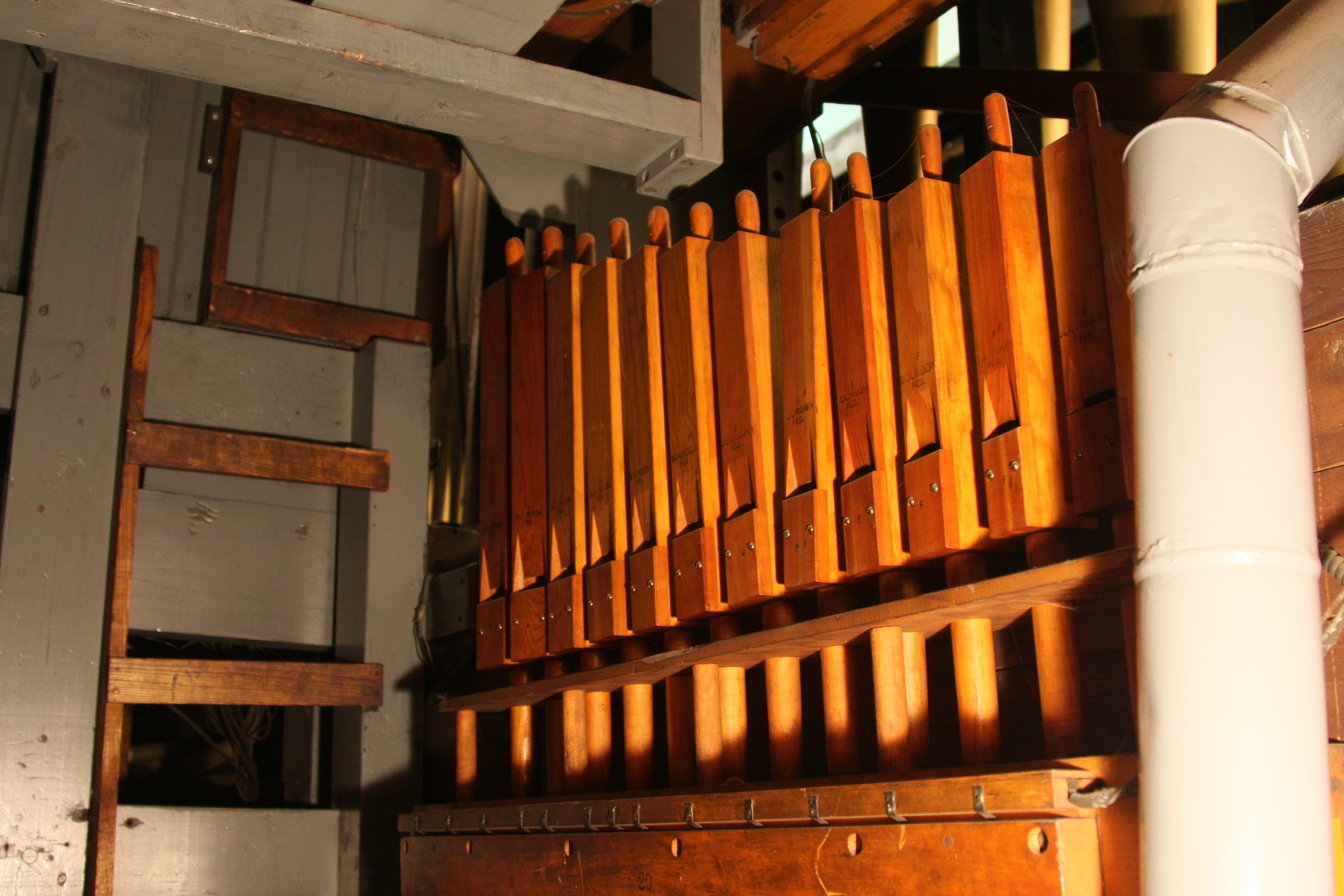
Highland Arts Theatre Casavant Frères Organ - view of one of the ranks of wooden pipes inside the organ.

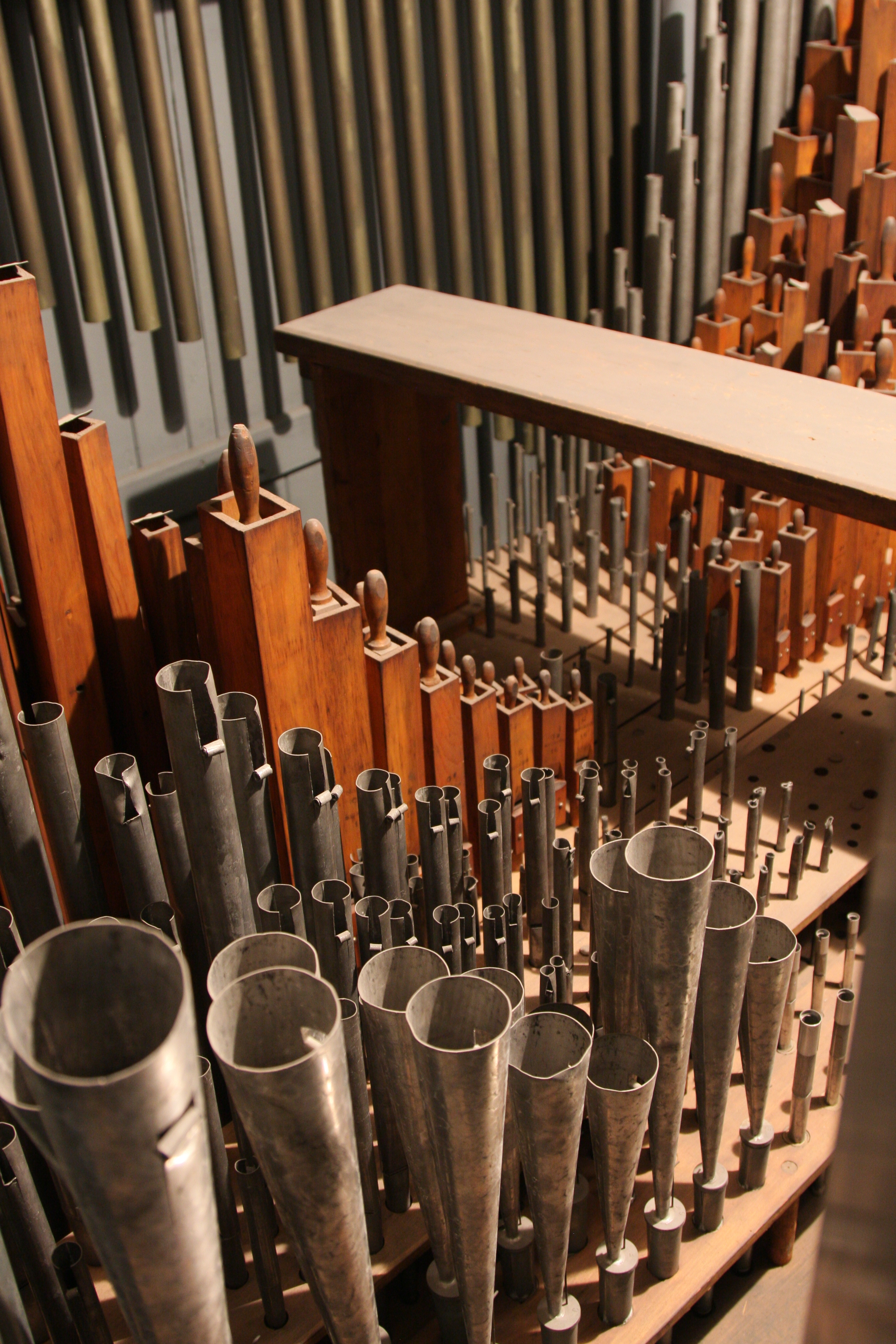
Highland Arts Theatre Casavant Frères Organ - view of a number of the ranks of metal and wooden pipes inside one of the swell boxes inside the organ.

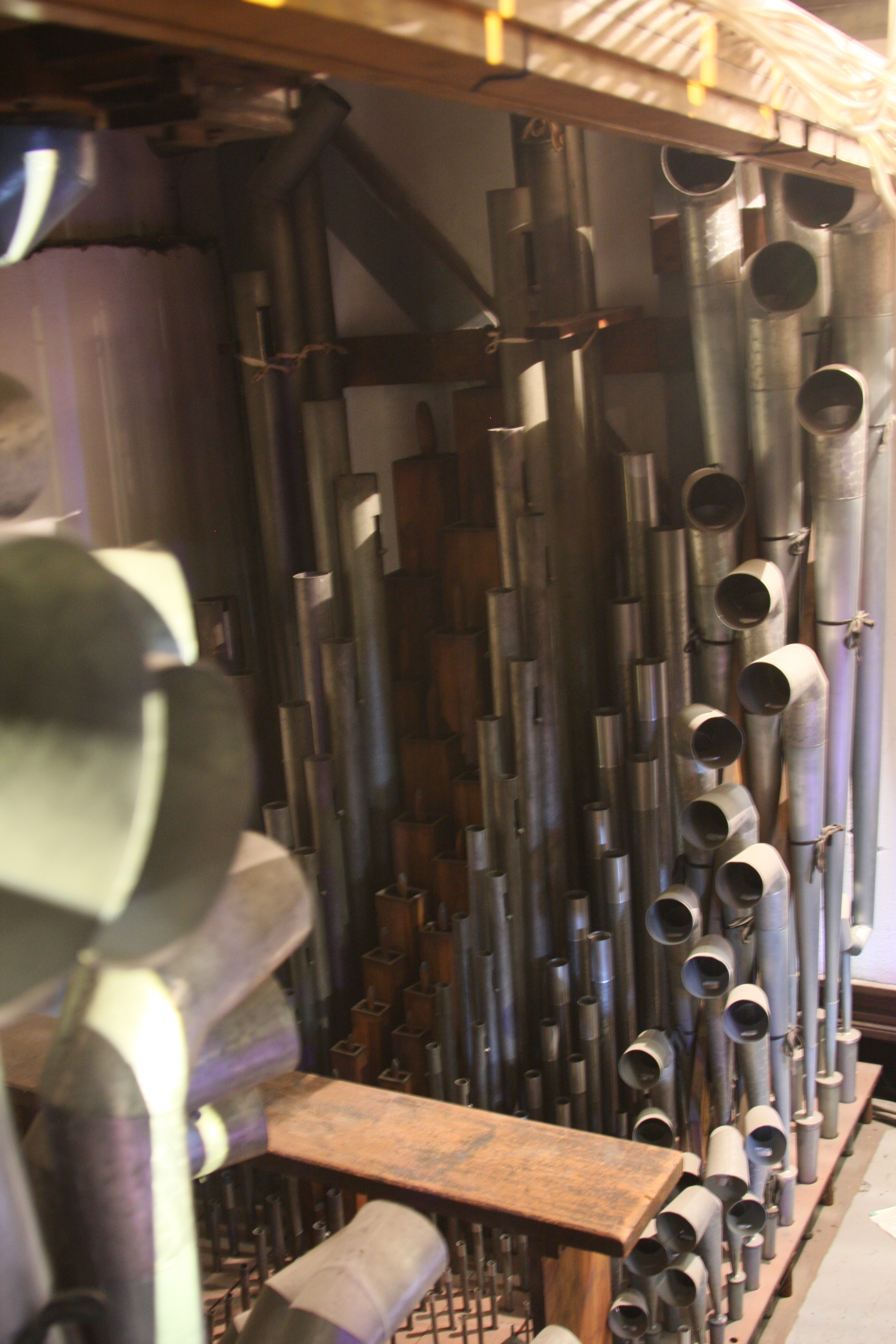
Highland Arts Theatre Casavant Frères Organ - view of several of the ranks of metal pipes inside one of the swell boxes inside the organ.

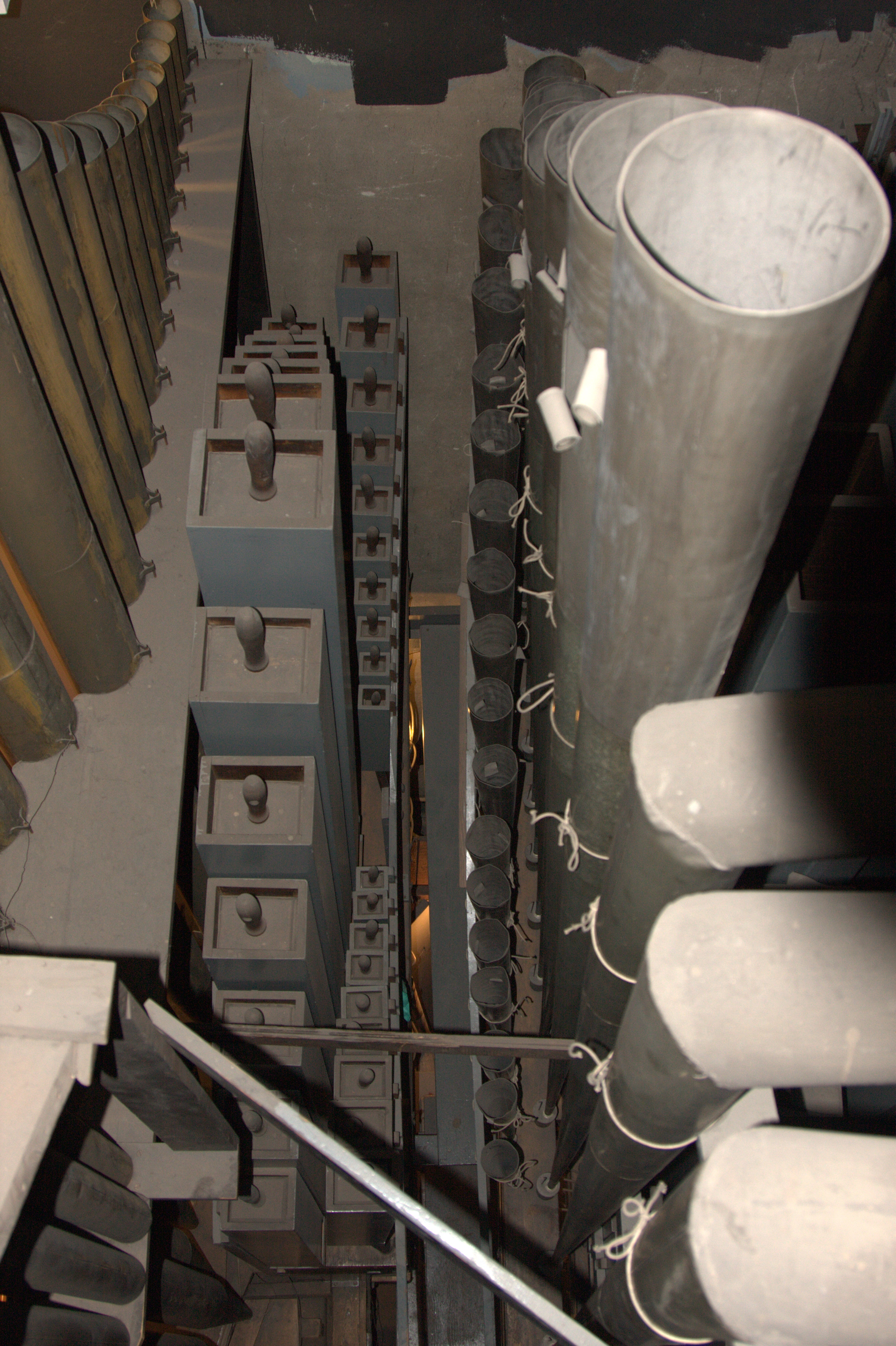
Highland Arts Theatre Casavant Frères Organ - looking down from above at several of the ranks of metal and wooden pipes inside the organ.
