= Nathaniel Curry =

Canadian politician

The Hon. Nathaniel Curry
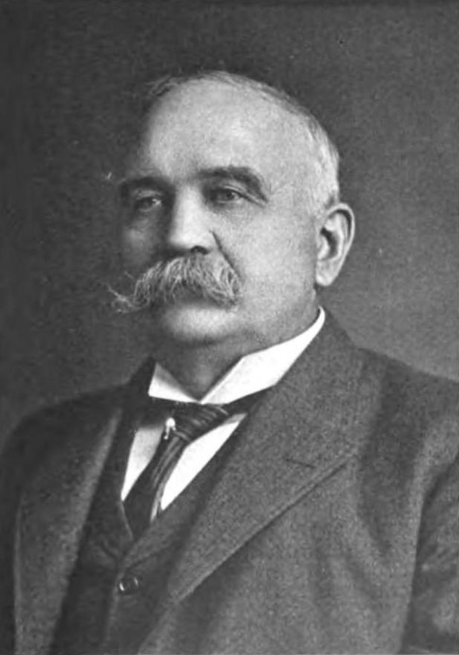

Senator for Amherst, Nova Scotia
- In office 1912–1931
- Appointed by: Robert Borden

Personal details
- Born: March 26, 1851 Port Williams, Nova Scotia
- Died: October 23, 1931 (aged 80)
- Party: Conservative
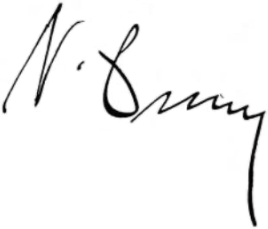
- Signature

Nathaniel Curry (March 26, 1851 – October 23, 1931) was a building contractor, manufacturer and political figure in Nova Scotia, Canada. He represented Amherst division in the Senate of Canada from 1912 to 1931.

== Biography ==
He was born in Port Williams, Nova Scotia, the son of Charles Curry and Eunice Davidson. Curry worked in the United States as a miner and railroad employee before returning to Nova Scotia in 1877. He established the Rhodes Curry Company (later part of Canadian Car and Foundry) in Amherst with his brother-in-law Nelson Rhodes. In 1881, he married Mary Hall. Curry was mayor of Amherst in 1894. He was chosen as president of the Canadian Manufacturers Association in 1911. That same year, Curry established the Chair of Engineering at Acadia University. He died in office at Tidnish in Cumberland County at the age of 80.
