= Wycamp Lake =

Lake of in Emmet County, Michigan, United States of America

- Location in Michigan Wycamp Lake (the United States)
- Location: Emmet County, Michigan
- Coordinates: 45°39′39″N 84°57′58″W
- Type: Lake
- Basin countries: United States
- Surface area: 709 acres (2.87 km^{2})
- Max. depth: 7 ft (2.1 m)
- Shore length^{1}: 9.8 mi (15.8 km)
- Surface elevation: 610 ft (186 m)
- ^{1} Shore length is not a well-defined measure.

Wycamp Lake is a shallow lake in Emmet County in the U.S. state of Michigan. 709 acres (287 ha) in size, it is located approximately 3 miles (4.8 km) northeast of Cross Village, Michigan. It is located within Mackinaw State Forest and is served by local unimproved roads and by the North Country Trail.

A typical shallow lake in the North Woods, the lake is partly surrounded by wetlands. Like much of the Mackinaw State Forest, the region around the lake was cut over in the late 1800s for timber; exhausted land parcels were allowed to return to the public sector. Much of the lake's watershed is owned and managed by the Michigan Department of Natural Resources (M-DNR). The lake is technically a reservoir; a dam at the Wycamp Creek outlet controls the flowage of the lake's water to Lake Michigan.

The creek and lake shoreline have been inhabited for centuries, and the Wycamp Creek Site, a Lake Michigan shoreline campsite by the lake's creek outlet, has been listed on the National Register of Historic Places. Stone tools excavated at the site could have been used to hunt birds, and Wycamp Lake is a noted bird-hunting location to this day.

== See also ==
- List of lakes in Michigan
