= Black River, Nova Scotia =

Black River, Nova Scotia may refer to the following communities in Nova Scotia:

- Black River, Inverness County
- Black River, Kings, Nova Scotia, Kings County
- Black River, Pictou, Nova Scotia, Pictou County
