= Mackinaw State Forest =

State forest in Michigan

- Map showing state forests in Michigan

- Location within Michigan Location within the United States
- Location: Lower Peninsula, Michigan
- Coordinates: 45.27°N 84.44°W
- Area: 717,500 acres (2,904 km^{2})
- Governing body: Michigan Department of Natural Resources

The Mackinaw State Forest is a 717,500-acre (2,904 km^{2}) forested area owned by the U.S. state of Michigan and operated by the Michigan Department of Natural Resources. It is located in the northern area of the Lower Peninsula within the eight counties of Alpena, Antrim, Charlevoix, Cheboygan, Emmet, Montmorency, Otsego, and Presque Isle. The forest is served by Interstate 75, U.S. Highway 23 (US 23), and US 131.

== Description ==
Most of the Mackinaw State Forest was logged for red pine and white pine during the golden age of Michigan old-growth lumbering, which ended about 1910. Much of the cut-over land was seen as worthless and was allowed to revert to the state of Michigan in lieu of unpaid property taxes.

Second-growth trees found within the Mackinaw State Forest include the alder, aspen, paper birch, yellow birch, hophornbeam, sugar maple, balsam poplar, willow, balsam fir, hemlock, larch, jack pine, black spruce, white spruce, and northern whitecedar.

The forest is managed today for second-growth logging, recreation, and tourism purposes. Starting in 1918, the state stocked part of the forest with a herd of free-range elk (Cervus canadensis). Today numbering about 850, the elk live in and around the Black River area where Cheboygan, Montmorency and Otsego counties come together.

The Mackinaw State Forest is home to a rich diversity of animal species, including the Northern flying squirrel (Glaucomys sabrinus), American black bear (Ursus americanus), white-tailed deer (Odocoileus virginianus), wild turkey (Meleagris gallopavo), ruffed grouse (Bonasa umbellus), American marten (Martes americana), osprey (Pandion haliaetus), bald eagle (Haliaeetus leucocephalus) and pileated woodpecker (Dryocopus pileatus).

The Mackinaw State Forest is home to Michigan's two most critically endangered species: the Kirtland's warbler (Setophaga kirtlandii) and Hungerford's crawling water beetle (Brychius hungerfordi). Indeed, of the five known locations in which Hungerford's crawling water beetles have been found, two are within the Mackinaw State Forest, one along the East Branch of the Black River and the other in Van Hetton Creek. The Van Hetton Creek identifications are significant as they represented a new location beyond those originally identified when the Hungerford's crawling water beetle was categorized as endangered in 1994. This suggests that the rare beetle may occur in other sites as yet undiscovered elsewhere in Mackinaw State Forest.

Fishing lakes within the State Forest include Emmet County's Wycamp Lake. Fifty miles (80 km) of the North Country Trail run within the Mackinaw State Forest.

== Deadman's Hill Scenic Overlook ==
Deadman's Hill is a scenic overlook and trailhead near Elmira, Michigan in Antrim County within the Mackinaw State Forest; the overlook enjoys a panoramic view over the headwaters of the Jordan River, and the trailhead serves an 18,000-acre (73 km^{2}) parcel of state forestland that surrounds the same river headwaters. The overlook is located at 45.04578 N., -84.93850 W., and is accessible by all-weather gravel road from U.S. 131.

The hill and overlook are named in memory of Samuel Graczyk (also known as 'Stanley' Graczyk), who perished here in a "Big wheel" accident on May 20, 1910. The relatively steep slopes of the upper Jordan River made this a dangerous area to cut down trees or transport logs. Graczyk planned to marry his fiancée on the evening of the day of the fatal accident, and local legend asserts that the bridegroom's ghost haunts the overlook, especially at sunset.

A large proportion of the trees in the upper Jordan River valley are sugar maples, and the overlook is a noted autumn foliage viewing spot.
