= Wycamp Creek Site =

- U.S. National Register of Historic Places
- Location within Michigan Location within the United States
- Nearest city: Levering, Michigan
- Coordinates: 45°39′8″N 85°0′10″W
- Area: 1 acre (0.40 ha)
- NRHP reference No.: 71001022
- Added to NRHP: March 11, 1971

The Wycamp Creek Site (designated 20EM4) is an archaeological site located near Levering, Michigan. It was placed on the National Register of Historic Places in 1971.

The Wycamp Creek Site is located in a small dune field near Lake Michigan, on a Nipissing terrace near Wycamp Creek.

It is likely this site was occupied more or less continuously throughout the Late Middle and Late Woodland period. It was first identified by archaeologists in a 1927 survey done by Emerson F. Greenman. In 1967, a small section of the site was excavated by a team from Michigan State University led by Charles E. Cleland. Radiocarbon dating from the site brackets the period of occupation from about 1320 to 400 years before the present. The material found at the site provides information on techniques used to make stone tools.
