= Big Black River =

Big Black River may refer to

- Big Black River (Saint John River tributary) (French: Grande Rivière Noire) in Canada and the United States
- Big Black River (Mississippi), United States

== See also ==
- Little Black River (disambiguation)
- Black River (disambiguation)
- Noire River (disambiguation)
