= Pugwash station =

Railway station in Nova Scotia, Canada

Pugwash Railway Station
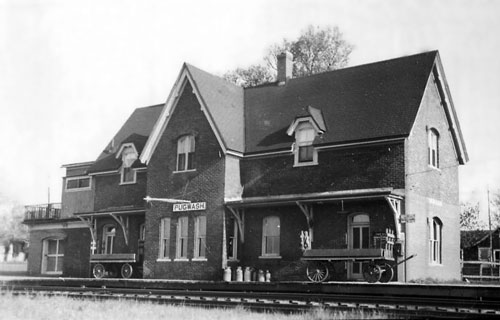
- Circa 1940

General information
- Location: 10222 Durham Street; Pugwash, NS
- Coordinates: 45.84975°N 63.66068°W
- Line: Canadian National Railway

Construction
- Structure type: Gothic Revival-style, 1 1/2-storey heritage railway station building

History
- Opened: October 30, 1890
- Closed: 1970s
- Former names: Canadian National Railway, Intercolonial Railway

Nova Scotia Heritage Property Act
- Type: Provincially Registered Property
- Designated: 2009

Nova Scotia Heritage Property Act
- Type: Municipally Registered Property
- Designated: 1996
Location

The Pugwash station is a former inter-city railway station building in the community of Pugwash, Nova Scotia, Canada. It was operated by Canadian National Railway, and now houses the North Cumberland Historical Society and a pop-up cafe operated by the Pugwash Farmer's Market.

== History ==
On September 18, 1882, the town of Pugwash celebrated the commencement of work on the railway in Pugwash. The commencement of work there with special ceremonies presided over by Mr. and Mrs. Alexander Wilson a leading citizen with a "sod-turning ceremony". The station was designed by Sir Sandford Fleming, the Scottish-born engineer notable for successfully promoting standard time, and it was built by Rhodes, Curry & Co. The first passengers to arrive via railway to Pugwash was a group of Cumberland County school teachers, October 28, 1890.

It is built of brick and is described as "restrained gothic style, two stories, cross gable roof with 6 hip gable dormers and decorative faces". The railway station was listed on September 11, 1996, as a Municipally Registered Property under the Heritage Property Act, and as a Provincially Registered Property under the same statute in 2009. The Pugwash railway station is one of only two stations designed by Fleming still standing in Nova Scotia. The station is also famous for its part in the Thinkers Conference. Pugwash native Cyrus Eaton used the station to transport and house those who attended conference.

== Fires of 1926 and 1929 ==
The devastating fires of 1926 and 1929 destroyed the pugwash hotels, so luxury railcars were parked at the station and used as accommodations.

== See also ==
- List of historic places in Cumberland County, Nova Scotia
