= Black River =

Black River is a common name for streams and communities around the world: in Spanish and Portuguese, Rio Negro; in French, Rivière Noire; in Turkish, Kara Su; in Serbo-Croatian, Crna Reka, Црна Река or Crna Rijeka, Црна Ријека; in Macedonian, Црна Река, Crna Reka. It may refer to:

== Streams ==
=== Africa ===
- Bafing River, also known as Black River
- Black River (Cape Town)
- Niger River, named by European mapmakers during the Middle Ages, perhaps from Latin niger "black"

=== Australia ===
- Black River (Queensland)
- Black River (Tasmania)
- Black River (Victoria)

=== Brazil and Colombia ===
- Black River (Amazon), known as Rio Negro in Portuguese and Río Negro or Río Guainía in Spanish

=== Canada ===
- Black River (New Brunswick)
- Black River (Ontario), listing eight rivers of the name
- Black River (Portneuf), Quebec
- Black River, a river on Vancouver Island, British Columbia
- Noire River (Ottawa River tributary), Quebec, English translation Black River

=== China ===
==== Mainland ====
- Amur River
- Black River (Asia), also known as Lixian River, a tributary of the Red River
- Ejin River, also known as the Heihe (黑河, lit. "black river")

=== Honduras ===
- Sico River, historically called the Rio Tinto, or Black River

=== India ===
- Krishna River, from Sanskrit Krishna "Black"
- Kali River (Karnataka)
- Kali River (Uttar Pradesh)
- Kalindi River, West Bengal
- Kalindi River, another name for Yamuna

=== Ireland ===
- Black River (Ireland), in counties Galway and Mayo
- Duff River, in counties Leitrim and Sligo; the northern part is also known as the Black River

=== Jamaica ===
- Black River (Jamaica)

=== Macedonia ===
- Crna River (Vardar)

=== Russia ===
- Amur River
- Chernaya River (Saint Petersburg), also known as the Tchernaya Rechka

=== Sri Lanka ===
- Black River (Sri Lanka)

=== Taiwan ===
- Black River (Taiwan), another name for the Dadu River

=== Ukraine ===
- Chyornaya (Crimea), also known as the Black River

=== United States ===
- Draanjik River, also known as Black River, a tributary of the Porcupine River in Alaska
- Black River (Arizona), a tributary of the Salt River
- Black River (Arkansas–Missouri), a tributary of the White River
- Black River, the name of the lower reaches of the Ouachita River in Arkansas
- Black River (Okefenokee Swamp), Georgia
- Black River (Indiana), a small tributary of the Wabash River
- Black River (Louisiana)
- In Michigan:
  - Black River (Alcona County), tributary of Lake Huron
  - Black River (Cheboygan County), tributary of the Cheboygan River
  - Black River (Gogebic County), tributary of Lake Superior
  - Black River (Mackinac County), tributary of Lake Michigan
  - Black River, tributary of Lake Michigan, also called Macatawa River
  - Black River (Marquette County), tributary of the Escanaba River
  - Black River (Southwest Michigan), tributary of Lake Michigan
  - Black River (St. Clair River tributary), tributary of the St. Clair River
- In Minnesota:
  - Black River (Rainy River)
  - Black River (Red Lake River)
- Black River (New Jersey), a tributary of the North Branch Raritan River
- Black River (New Mexico), a tributary of the Pecos River
- In New York:
  - Black River (New York), a tributary of Lake Ontario
  - Black River (Kinderhook Creek tributary), in Rensselaer County
  - Black River (Bouquet River tributary), in Essex County
- Black River (North Carolina), a tributary of the Cape Fear River
- Black River (Ohio), a tributary of Lake Erie
- Black River (Saucon Creek), in Pennsylvania
- Black River (South Carolina), a tributary of the Great Pee Dee River
- In Vermont:
  - Black River (Connecticut River tributary), a tributary of the Connecticut River in southern Vermont
  - Black River (Lake Memphremagog), a tributary of Lake Memphremagog in northern Vermont
- In Washington:
  - Black River (Chehalis River tributary), a tributary of the Chehalis River in the state of Washington
  - Black River (Duwamish River tributary), a river in the state of Washington
- In Wisconsin:
  - Black River (Wisconsin-Lake Michigan), a tributary of Lake Michigan in the state of Wisconsin
  - Black River (Wisconsin), a tributary of Mississippi River in the state of Wisconsin
  - Black River (Nemadji River), a tributary of the Nemadji River in the state of Wisconsin

=== Vietnam ===
- Black River (Asia), also known as Lixian River in China, a tributary of the Red River

== Communities ==
=== Mauritius ===
- Rivière Noire District, a district in Mauritius which mean 'Black River' in French

=== Australia ===
- Black River, Tasmania, a locality in North-west Tasmania

=== Canada ===
- New Brunswick:
  - Black River, New Brunswick (disambiguation), several places
  - Black River Bridge, New Brunswick
- Black River, Newfoundland and Labrador
- Black River, Nova Scotia (disambiguation), listing three communities of that name
- Ontario:
  - Black River, Ontario, a community in Stormont, Dundas and Glengarry United Counties
  - Black River-Matheson, a municipality and township in Cochrane District

=== United States ===
- Black River, Michigan, an unincorporated community in Alcona Township
- Black River, New York, a village in Jefferson County
- Black River, Wisconsin, an unincorporated community in Douglas County
- Black River Falls, Wisconsin, a city in Jackson County
- Black River Township, Pennington County, Minnesota

=== Other communities ===
- Black River, Jamaica, the capital of St. Elizabeth Parish
- Black River (settlement), an 18th-century British settlement on the Caribbean coast of present-day Honduras

== Films ==
- Black River (1957 film), a Japanese film by Masaki Kobayashi
- Black River (1993 film), an Australian film by Kevin Lucas
- Black River (2001 film), a US adventure film

== Music ==
- Black River (band), a Polish stoner rock/heavy metal band
  - Black River (album), the debut album of the band
- Black River Entertainment, an American country-music record label
- Black Rivers, an English rock band
- Black River, a 2008 song by Bomb the Bass featuring Mark Lanegan
- "The Black River", a song by the Sword from Gods of the Earth

== Others ==
- Black River (stage), the name of a stage in North American stratigraphy
- Black River Public School (Holland, Michigan), a charter school

== See also ==
- Big Black River (disambiguation)
- Little Black River (disambiguation)
- Black River High School (disambiguation)
- Black River Township (disambiguation)
- Black Brook (disambiguation)
- Black Creek (disambiguation)
- Blackwater river
- Rio Negro (disambiguation), rivers whose Spanish name means 'Black River'
- Kara Su (disambiguation), rivers whose Turkish name means 'Black River'
- Crna Reka (disambiguation), rivers whose Serbo-Croatian, or Macedonian name means 'Black River'
- Crna Rijeka (disambiguation), rivers whose Serbo-Croatian name means 'Black River'
- Wu River (disambiguation), rivers whose Chinese name means 'Black River'
- Heishui (disambiguation), rivers whose Chinese name means 'Black River'
- Heihe, a Chinese city whose name means 'Black River'
