= List of Michigan rivers named Black River =

Index of articles associated with the same name

Black River may refer to any of seven streams in the U.S. state of Michigan:

- Black River (Alcona County), flows into Lake Huron at the community of Black River, Michigan
- Black River (Cheboygan County), also flows through Otsego, Montmorency, and Presque Isle counties into the Straits of Mackinac at Cheboygan, Michigan
- Black River (Southwest Michigan), flows through Allegan and Van Buren counties into Lake Michigan at South Haven
- Black River (Gogebic County), a National Wild and Scenic River in the Ottawa National Forest that flows into Lake Superior
- Black River (Mackinac County), flows into Lake Michigan
- Black River (Marquette County), flows into the Middle Branch of the Escanaba River
- Black River (St. Clair River tributary), rises in Sanilac County and flows into the St. Clair River at Port Huron, Michigan
- Macatawa River (flows into Lake Macatawa) in Ottawa County is also known as the Black River

== See also ==
- List of Michigan rivers named Little Black River
- Black River, Michigan, a community in Alcona County
- Black River (disambiguation)
