= Rhodes Curry Company =

Former Canadian transportation manufacturer

Rhodes Curry Company was a construction contractor and builder of railway rolling stock based in Amherst, Nova Scotia. Rhodes Curry Company was a significant business in the industrial, commercial, and architectural history of Nova Scotia, and was instrumental in the commercial development and expansion of Nova Scotia’s turn-of-the-century economy.

Rhodes Curry Company had a reputation for quality of workmanship and craftsmanship and was the contractor and builder of a number of grand homes, churches, and business in the late nineteenth and early twentieth century. Many examples of their work still survive, such as the Pugwash Train Station in Pugwash, Nova Scotia, St. Andrew's Presbyterian Church in Sydney, Nova Scotia, and Beinn Bhreagh, the former estate of Alexander Graham Bell, in Victoria County, Nova Scotia, all recognised Heritage Properties.

Industrialist Nelson Admiral Rhodes, Nathaniel Curry and Barry Dodge founded a construction company in Amherst, Nova Scotia, in 1877.

It was originally a manufacturer of sash and doors, but they soon switched to construction business. It later acquired mills and other manufacturing plants (brick and other building materials) in the 1880s.

After the departure of Dodge, the company expanded into the railcar repairing business in 1880s.

Rhodes and Curry acquired Harris Car Works and Foundry of Saint John, NB in 1893 and moved operations to Amherst.

Rhodes Curry Company began operations in 1891 and began building railcars for railways in the region. The company expanded with branch plants in New Glasgow, Sydney and Halifax.

After Rhodes died in 1909, the company was sold to Canadian Car and Foundry, CCF. In 1920, the architectural and commercial building portion of the former Rhodes Curry Company split from CCF and continued to exist until the 1950s.

== Products ==
- Wooden boxcars, sold widely to Canadian railways
- Wooden passenger cars; customers included the Intercolonial Railway
- Wooden coal hopper cars; one large customer was Cumberland Railway and Coal Company in Springhill, Nova Scotia
- Other wooden railcars, including vans (caboose); customers included the Inverness and Richmond Railway, Cape Breton.
- single and double end closed streetcars
- open streetcars
