= Black River Township, Lorain County, Ohio =

Black River Township, Lorain County, Ohio, was originally established officially as Town(ship) "Number 7 in Range 18", of the Connecticut Western Reserve about '1807', but was later assigned the name, "Black River" township in '1817' ( although at that time also judicially included other areas of the county, until the year 1830). By the mid-20th-century, almost all of this township was encompassed by the City of Lorain. However, much of Black River Township's earliest pioneer history is more-closely associated with the nearby village of Amherst (which was also judicially included within the original "Black River township" judicial-district from 1817 until 1830.)

== History ==
The pioneer-settlement of this township technically began by about the year 1808, but the continual efforts of pioneer John S. Reid (beginning about 1809) became the main impetus for the establishment of the later City of Lorain (which had begun as the village named Mouth-of-Black-River, officially established by 1823). The "Beaver Creek Settlement" in the western portion of this township, beginning about 1810, was also another important factor towards the growth of this area. But most of the township remained rural farmland, until the early-1900s. However, by the mid-1900s, the City of Lorain had annexed almost the entire township into the Lorain city-limits ( excepting two small portions which were annexed to the village of Amherst and to Sheffield Township/Clearview School).
