= Martin Kutnowski =

Argentine composer

Martin Kutnowski is a composer and music theorist. His works are rooted in the tonal idiom, and references to the musical past are often embedded within folk materials. Disks and scores with Kutnowski's music are available on Contrapunctus, FJH Publications, Billaudot, Ricordi, and iTunes. His background music is also featured in shows such as MTV's Room Raiders.

Kutnowski writes about tonal rhythm in Mozart and Scriabin, atonal voice leading in Peter Maxwell Davies, relationship between music and the moving image in popular culture—at the MTSNYS, the Schenker Symposium, The Fifth and Sixth International Music Theory Conferences in Tallinn, and Montreal Ed Media 2005. Articles by Kutnowski can be read in Latin American Music Review, Popular Music and Society, Musica Clasica (Buenos Aires, Argentina), MTO, and ex-tempore. Kutnowski has also given public lectures about music in the US, Canada, England, Spain, Mexico, Argentina, Estonia, Taiwan, and the People's Republic of China. He also writes about teaching and learning in post-secondary education, with articles in About Campus, Teaching Perspectives and Community College Journal.

== Compositions ==
=== Solo piano ===
- "Peter Emberley's Dream" (2011)
- "Solfeggilonga" (2006)
- "Echoes, Pictures, Riddles and Tales for Piano Solo," ed. Helen Marlais. FJH Contemporary Editions" (May 2005)
- "Five Tango Etudes" (2001). Premio Tribuna Argentina de Compositores 2004
- "Postcards" (1999)
- "Lullaby for an Ancient Grandfather" (1997) First Prize NMJCLA 1998
- "The Well Transfigured Clavier" (1996)

=== Solo clarinet ===
- "Momentum" Dedicated to Venancio Rius Marti (1996)

=== Solo guitar ===
- "Prelude and Fugue" Dedicated to Tali Roth (2007)

=== Solo flute ===
- "12 etudes dans le style du tango" (12 Etudes in the Key of Tango) ed. Frédéric Chatoux. Gérard Billaudot Editeur, Paris (2008)

=== Chamber music ===
- "Does the Barley Bid the Wind Wait in His Course?," for mezzo-soprano and piano (based on texts by Bliss Carman)
- "Al ver mis horas," for flute and piano.
- "Between the Salt Water and the Sea Sand," for soprano and piano (based on Maritime Folk Songs)
- "En la mar hay una torre" For Clarinet Quintet; alternate version for Flute Quintet. Commissioned by the Newburyport Chamber Music Festival (2009)
- "The Spots of the Toad" ("Las manchas del sapo") For Violin, Violoncello, and Narrator; versions in Spanish and English. Commissioned by the Newburyport Chamber Music Festival (2009)
- "Five Argentinean Folk Pieces" For Viola, Flute, and Piano (2002)
- "Three Tango Steps." For Violin and Piano (2000)
- "Buenos Aires Y2K. For Piano Trio (original version 2000; revised for publication in 2008) ed. Frédéric Chatoux. Gérard Billaudot Editeur, Paris (2008)
- "Transformations" For Viola, Clarinet, and Piano (1998)
- "Trio Sonata" For flute, clarinet and cello (1997)
- "Remember" For solo baritone, choir and organ. Based on a poem by Christina Rossetti (1996)
- "Affaire Buenos Aires-Nocturno" For Piano Quartet (1991)
- "Elegía" For Piano Quartet (1990)

=== Chamber orchestra ===
- "Concerto for Clarinet and Orchestra" Commissioned by Opus Mundi, Ltd, London, UK (2010), dedicated to Venancio Rius Marti, premiere supported by Arts New Brunswick
- "Five Argentinean Folk Pieces" Commissioned by the Minnesota Symphonia, Minneapolis/St. Paul (2002)
- "Elegie: Fantasia quasi una Sonata" (1996)

=== Piano and orchestra ===
- Tango Rhapsody, dedicated to Ana Lourdes Rodriguez, supported by Arts New Brunswick (2009)

=== Chorus and orchestra ===
- "Il Sonno di Maddalena" For Mezzo-Soprano and Orchestra, with text by Sandro Gindro. Commissioned by Incontri di Musica Sacra Contemporanea 2005, sponsored by Associazione Psicoanalisi Contro
- "Preghiera per un addio" For mezzo-soprano, mixed chorus, and orchestra. Dedicated to Guillermo Castillón, in memorian. Commissioned by Incontri di Musica Sacra Contemporanea 2001, sponsored by Associazione Psicoanalisi Contro and by Associazione Romana Musicale Religiosa
