= Little Black River =

Little Black River may refer to:

- Little Black River (Alaska)
- Little Black River (Current River tributary), a stream in southern Missouri and northern Arkansas
- Little Black River (Saint John River), a tributary of the Saint John River in Quebec and northern Maine
- Little Black River (Cheboygan County), a tributary of Lake Huron in Michigan
- Little Black River (Gogebic County), a tributary of the Black River in Michigan
- Little Black River (Minnesota), a tributary of the Black River
- Little Black River, a left tributary of the Black River (Abitibi River), in Ontario
- Little Black River, a left tributary of the Black River (Thunder Bay District), in Ontario
- (Little) Black River First Nation, an Ojibwa First Nation located on the eastern shore of Lake Winnipeg

== See also ==
- Big Black River (disambiguation)
- Black River (disambiguation)
