= Black River, Kings, Nova Scotia =

Community in Nova Scotia, Canada

Coordinates: 45°0′38.49″N 64°24′59.83″W

Black River in Nova Scotia

Black River is a community in the Canadian province of Nova Scotia, located in Kings County.
