= Black River Public School (Holland, Michigan) =

School in Holland, Michigan, United States

Location
- 491 Columbia Avenue; Holland, Michigan 49423; United States; 42°46′44″N 86°6′0″W

Information
- Type: Public, Charter
- Motto: "Preparing students for college and life."
- Established: July 1996
- Principal: Shannon Brunink
- Grades: K-12
- Enrollment: ~850
- Colors: Green; Black
- Nickname: River Rats
- Website: School website

Student assessments
- 2021–22 school year Change vs. prior year

M-STEP 11th grade proficiency rates (Science / Social Studies)
- Advanced %: 43.7 / 26.8
- Proficient %: 31.0 / 35.2
- PR. Proficient %: 7.0 / 29.6
- Not Proficient %: 18.3 / 8.5

Average test scores
- SAT Total: 1114.2 (▼ −37.8)

Black River Public School is a public college preparatory charter school located in Holland, Michigan.

== History ==
One of Michigan's earliest charter schools, Black River Public School was founded in July 1996 after receiving a charter from Grand Valley State University. Its operations initially took place in the Federal School building on 8th Street and during its four years there, 14 portables were added due to growth. Due to the overcrowding, BASF Corporation donated a 50,000-square-foot (4,600 m^{2}) building, originally occupied by the Holland Furnace Company, to the school in 1998.

In 2001, Black River added a Montessori elementary program.

In May 2003, Black River was accredited by the American Academy for Liberal Education (AALE) and in 2004 by the North Central Association Commission of Accreditation and School Improvement.

In the summer of 2003, Black River added two new 8 and 6 room modular buildings to accommodate more elementary students.

In the spring of 2007, Black River expanded their campus with the completion of the a 20,000-square-foot structure referred to as the ‘Lyceum’. The building facilitates a gymnasium, cafeteria, and music facilities. Previously existing facilities were remodeled to provide additional classroom space.

In the fall of 2011 remodeling was completed on a former storage/loading dock facility to house the kindergarten program following its transition to an all-day schedule.

As a surprise donation, the school acquired a 3.5 acres of property in March 2013. While he or she requested anonymity; Black River’s Head of School, Shannon Brunink, acknowledged that it was a former board member who donated the parcel. City records state that $50,000 was the last selling price for the land prior to its redistribution to the school. This addition to the school’s campus is only a street away from the campus’s soccer field at 525 Lincoln Ave. The property had remained vacant since 2010, when the occupant, South Side Swim Club, had to foreclose due to lack of memberships. As of July 2022, it is unknown if Black River has made any formal use of the property yet.

In 2014 the school undertook a $4.87 million capital campaign to raise funds for a four part capital project benefiting the entire student body. Improvements included a new 27,000 sf elementary facility (built during the summer of 2015), a building renovation for a new chemistry lab, supplemental gym/cafeteria space, and significant technology upgrades throughout campus. The project was completed successfully with the new buildings opening in the fall of 2015, growing enrollment to nearly 1,000 students in grades K-12.

== See also ==
- Holland Public Schools
