= Little Black River (Cheboygan County) =

Location
- Country: United States

Physical characteristics
- Source
  - location: Beaugrand Township, Michigan
- Mouth
  - location: Cheboygan, Michigan
  - elevation: 591 ft (180 m)

Basin features
- Tributaries
  - left: South Branch Little Black River, West Branch Little Black River

The Little Black River is a 6.1-mile-long (9.8 km) stream in Cheboygan County in the U.S. state of Michigan. It rises in Beaugrand Township at 45°40′28″N 84°35′48″W and flows eastward into Lake Huron in the city of Cheboygan at 45°39′47″N 84°29′21″W, less than a mile west of the mouth of the Cheboygan River.

== Tributaries ==
(from the mouth)

- (left) South Branch Little Black River
- (left) West Branch Little Black River

== See also ==
- List of rivers of Michigan
