= Silver River (Michigan) =

Silver River may refer to the following streams in the U.S. state of Michigan:

- Silver River (Keweenaw County), drains to Lake Superior
- Silver River (Baraga County), drains to Huron Bay on Lake Superior
- Silver River (Baraga–Houghton counties), drains to the Sturgeon River
