= Marquette Trail =

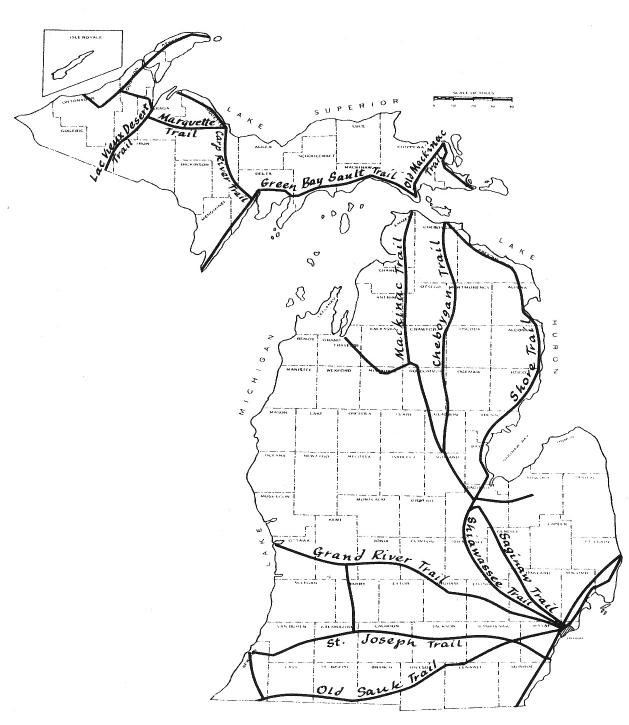
Pre-Statehood Trails of Michigan

The Marquette Trail is the name for a historically important American land route in the Upper Peninsula of Michigan between what is now Marquette, and the Keweenaw Bay near Baraga and L'Anse. Today this route is covered by two modern highways:

- US 41
- M-28
