= Falls River (Michigan) =

Tributary of Lake Superior in Baraga County, Upper Peninsula of Michigan

Location
- Country: United States
- State: Michigan
- County: Baraga

Physical characteristics
- Source: Interior uplands south of L'Anse
  - location: Baraga County, Michigan, U.S.
- Mouth: Lake Superior
  - location: L'Anse Bay (Keweenaw Bay), L'Anse, Michigan, U.S.

The Falls River flows through Baraga County on Michigan’s Upper Peninsula and enters Lake Superior at L’Anse Bay on the shoreline of L’Anse. The stream drains forested uplands south of the bay, dropping across a short series of rock ledges and small gorges before reaching Lake Superior.

== Course ==
Headwaters arise in wetlands and short lakes in the hills south of L’Anse. The river flows generally north, steepening as it approaches L’Anse Bay. Along the lower course it forms several cascades and falls before entering Keweenaw Bay at the village waterfront.

== See also ==
- List of rivers of Michigan
- Keweenaw Bay
- L'Anse, Michigan
