= Alberta, Michigan =

- Unincorporated community
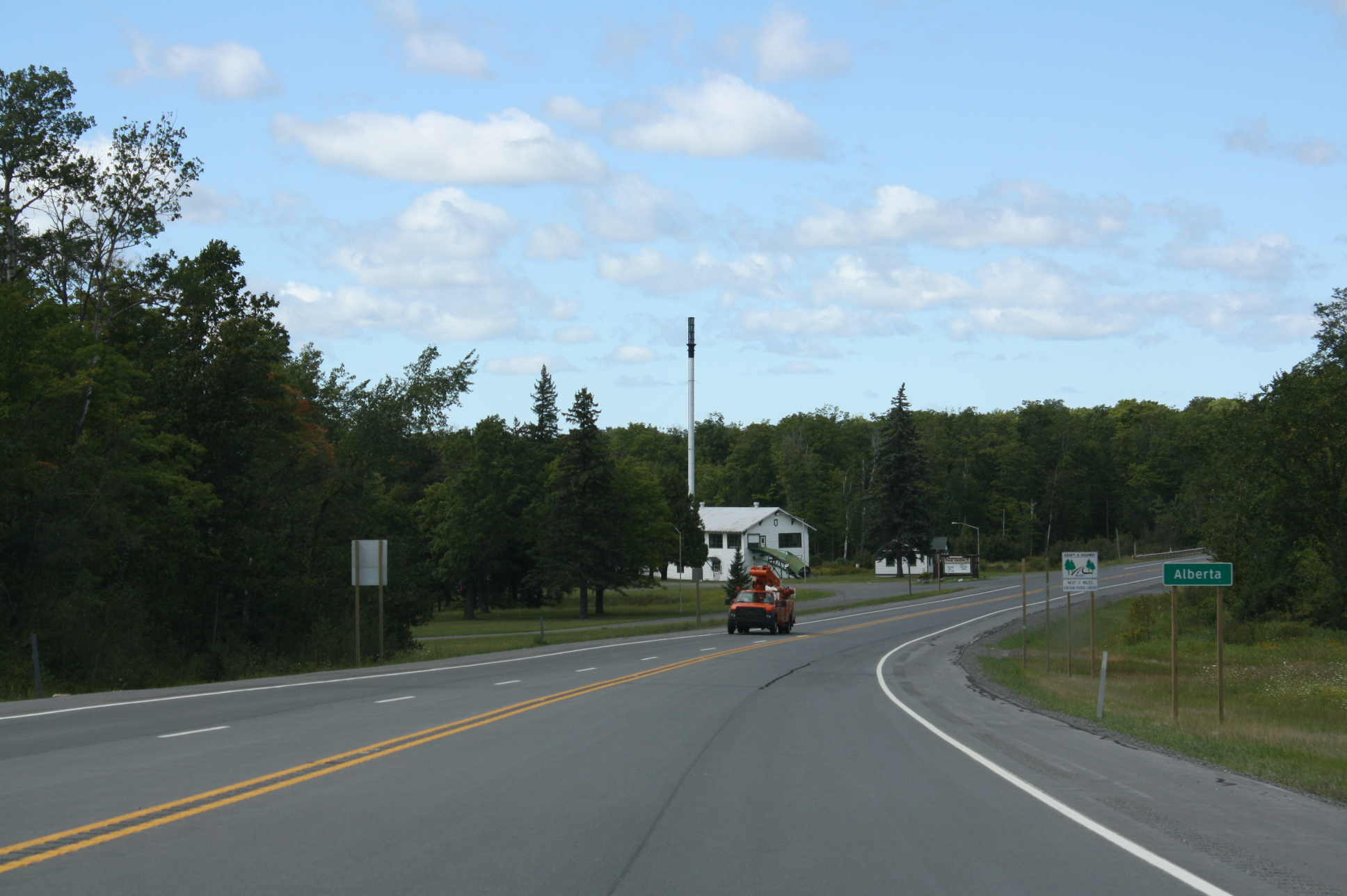
- Community of Alberta along U.S. Route 41

- Location within the state of Michigan
- Coordinates: 46°38′36″N 88°28′46″W
- Country: United States
- State: Michigan
- County: Baraga
- Township: L'Anse
- Elevation: 1,316 ft (401 m)
- Time zone: UTC-5 (Eastern (EST))
  - Summer (DST): UTC-4 (EDT)
- ZIP code: 49946
- Area code: 906
- GNIS feature ID: 619905

Alberta is an unincorporated community in L'Anse Township of Baraga County in the U.S. state of Michigan. It is situated on US Highway 41 (US 41) about eight miles (13 km) south of the village of L'Anse at 46°38′37″N 88°28′46″W. Alberta is the site of the Ford Center, managed by the Michigan Technological University College of Forest Resources and Environmental Science.

The community was founded in 1936 after Henry Ford declared the banks of the Plumbago Creek to be an ideal spot for a sawmill. Ford named the town "Alberta" after the daughter of the superintendent of Ford's Upper Peninsula Operations at the time, Fred J. Johnson (not, as is sometimes claimed, Edward G. Kingsford, for whom the town of Kingsford, Michigan and Kingsford charcoal is named, as his only daughter was named Dorothy). It was Ford's intention to have a model lumber and sawmill town, as well as to construct a plant in the southeastern forests of the Keweenaw.

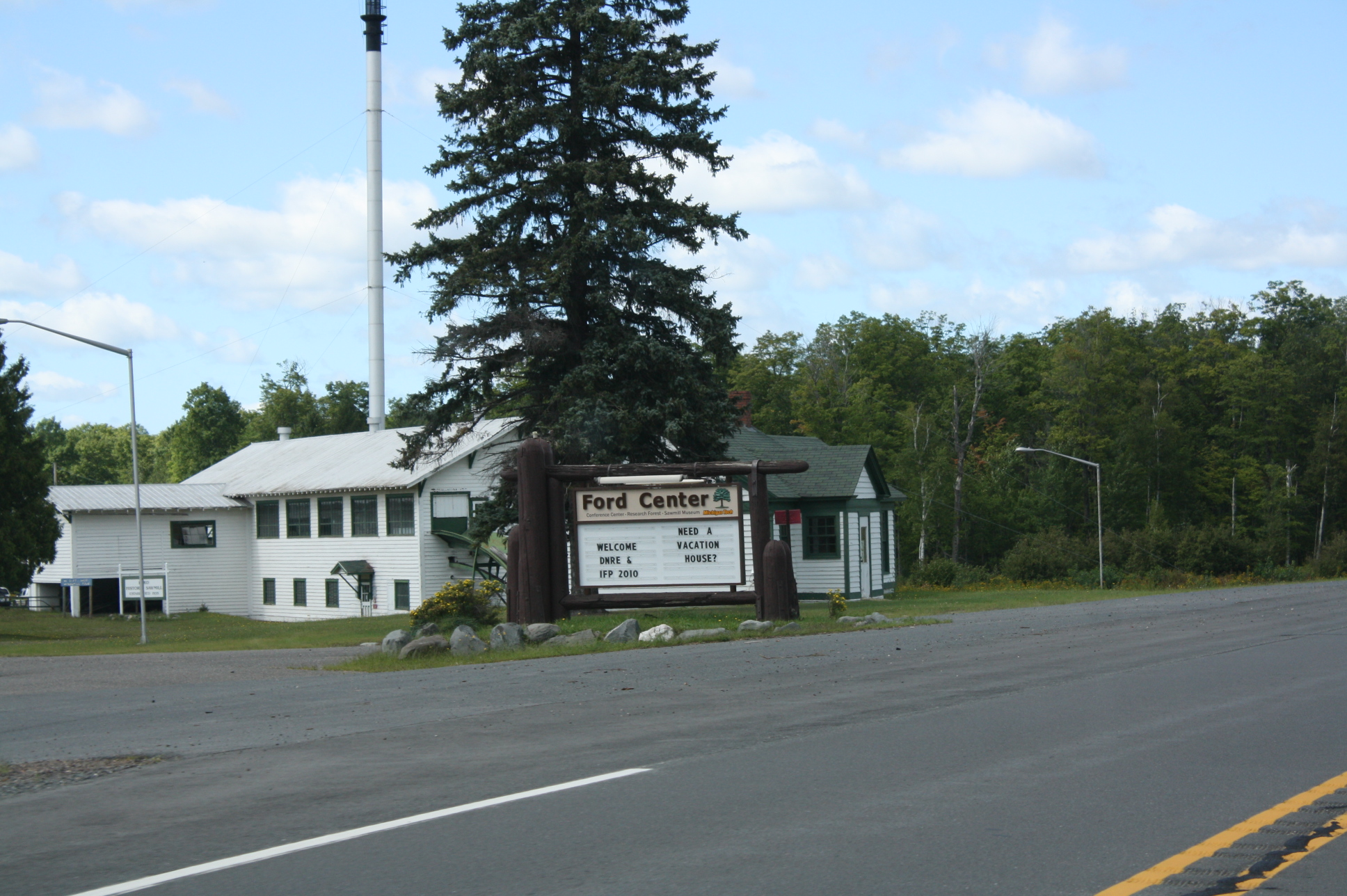
Ford Center in Alberta

At the time Ford established Alberta, wood was used extensively in automobiles. The original village of Alberta consisted of twelve houses, two schools, and a steam-driven mill built to the most modern standards of the day. The Plumbago Creek was dammed to provide a reservoir to serve the town and mill's water supply needs. The mill was a two-story white clapboard wood-frame structure and still stands, now housing a portion of the Alberta Village Museum. The saw mill had a capacity of 14,000 board feet (33 m^{3}) per day for hardwood and 20,000 board feet (47 m^{3}) per day for softwood. This was a small capacity even by 1936 standards, with Ford's other three mills in the Upper Peninsula of Michigan producing twenty to twenty-five times as much. Those who resided in Alberta were expected to divide their time lumbering, milling, and farming.

Similarities exist between both the Ford-established and administered communities of Alberta and the town of Belterra, in the Brazilian state of Pará. It has been professionally noted that both towns were established by the Ford Motor Company around generally the same time. Both provided much-needed resources for the construction of the Model T, Alberta was a supplier of wood, and Belterra, a provider of rubber to the company.

Ford had closed the operations in the community around the year 1943, and the community gradually began to diminish, although it was not until the year of 1954 that the sawmill ceased its operations, and the Ford Motor Company officially donated the town of Alberta, Michigan, and the 1,700 acres (690 ha) of land around it to what is now the College of Forest Resources and Environmental Science at Michigan Technological University.

Buildings still standing that were part of the original village on this property are now used as a museum, they also support research and serve as a hub for teaching programs for those with forestry and ecology majors, the buildings are also used by numerous universities from around the United States for forestry education.

== Climate ==
Climate data for Alberta Ford Forest Center, Michigan, 1991–2020 normals, 1956-2020: 1310ft (399m)
Month	Jan	Feb	Mar	Apr	May	Jun	Jul	Aug	Sep	Oct	Nov	Dec	Year
Record high °F (°C)	52 (11)	63 (17)	80 (27)	94 (34)	95 (35)	98 (37)	100 (38)	99 (37)	97 (36)	88 (31)	75 (24)	60 (16)	100 (38)
Mean maximum °F (°C)	39.2 (4.0)	44.3 (6.8)	58.4 (14.7)	70.7 (21.5)	85.4 (29.7)	88.8 (31.6)	87.4 (30.8)	88.6 (31.4)	84.0 (28.9)	76.4 (24.7)	56.3 (13.5)	43.7 (6.5)	91.5 (33.1)
Mean daily maximum °F (°C)	21.1 (−6.1)	25.2 (−3.8)	36.0 (2.2)	48.0 (8.9)	63.2 (17.3)	72.9 (22.7)	77.1 (25.1)	75.5 (24.2)	67.9 (19.9)	53.3 (11.8)	38.9 (3.8)	27.0 (−2.8)	50.5 (10.3)
Daily mean °F (°C)	13.7 (−10.2)	15.4 (−9.2)	25.4 (−3.7)	37.8 (3.2)	51.7 (10.9)	61.7 (16.5)	66.2 (19.0)	64.8 (18.2)	57.7 (14.3)	44.3 (6.8)	31.7 (−0.2)	20.2 (−6.6)	40.9 (4.9)
Mean daily minimum °F (°C)	6.2 (−14.3)	5.7 (−14.6)	14.8 (−9.6)	27.6 (−2.4)	40.3 (4.6)	50.4 (10.2)	55.3 (12.9)	54.0 (12.2)	47.4 (8.6)	35.4 (1.9)	24.5 (−4.2)	13.3 (−10.4)	31.2 (−0.4)
Mean minimum °F (°C)	−17.0 (−27.2)	−19.0 (−28.3)	−13.7 (−25.4)	8.6 (−13.0)	24.4 (−4.2)	33.5 (0.8)	41.5 (5.3)	40.4 (4.7)	31.3 (−0.4)	21.7 (−5.7)	2.6 (−16.3)	−8.9 (−22.7)	−21.4 (−29.7)
Record low °F (°C)	−35 (−37)	−38 (−39)	−31 (−35)	−12 (−24)	13 (−11)	25 (−4)	31 (−1)	31 (−1)	22 (−6)	9 (−13)	−16 (−27)	−33 (−36)	−38 (−39)
Average precipitation inches (mm)	1.97 (50)	1.58 (40)	1.56 (40)	2.65 (67)	3.27 (83)	3.45 (88)	4.12 (105)	3.15 (80)	3.56 (90)	3.68 (93)	2.10 (53)	2.08 (53)	33.17 (842)
Average snowfall inches (cm)	28.9 (73)	26.3 (67)	11.9 (30)	17.5 (44)	1.5 (3.8)	trace	0.0 (0.0)	0.0 (0.0)	0.0 (0.0)	3.1 (7.9)	19.7 (50)	24.8 (63)	133.7 (338.7)
Source 1: NOAA
Source 2: XMACIS (2007-2022 snowfall, records & monthly max/mins)
