= L'Anse Township, Michigan =

- Civil township
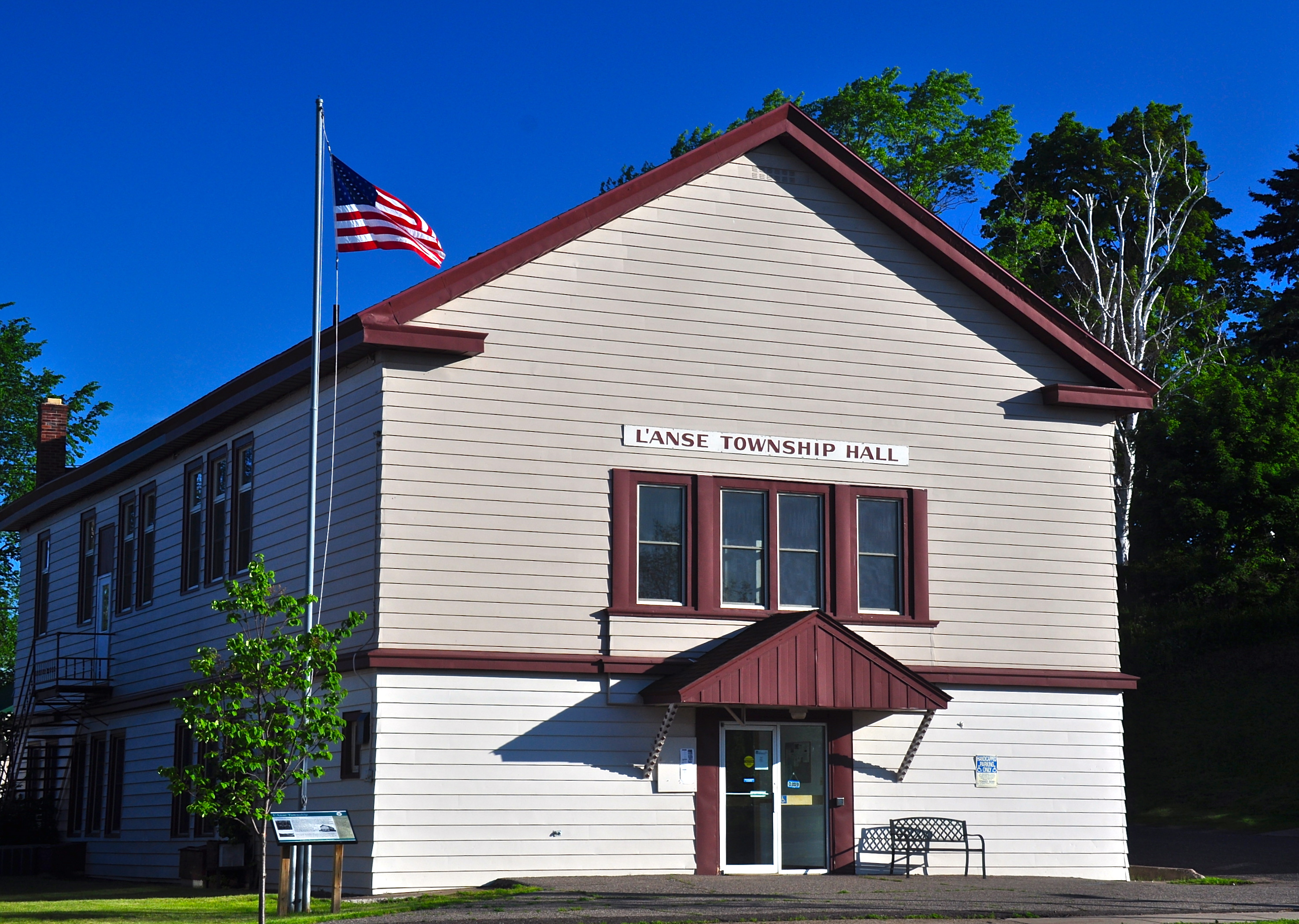
- L'Anse Township Hall in the village of L'Anse

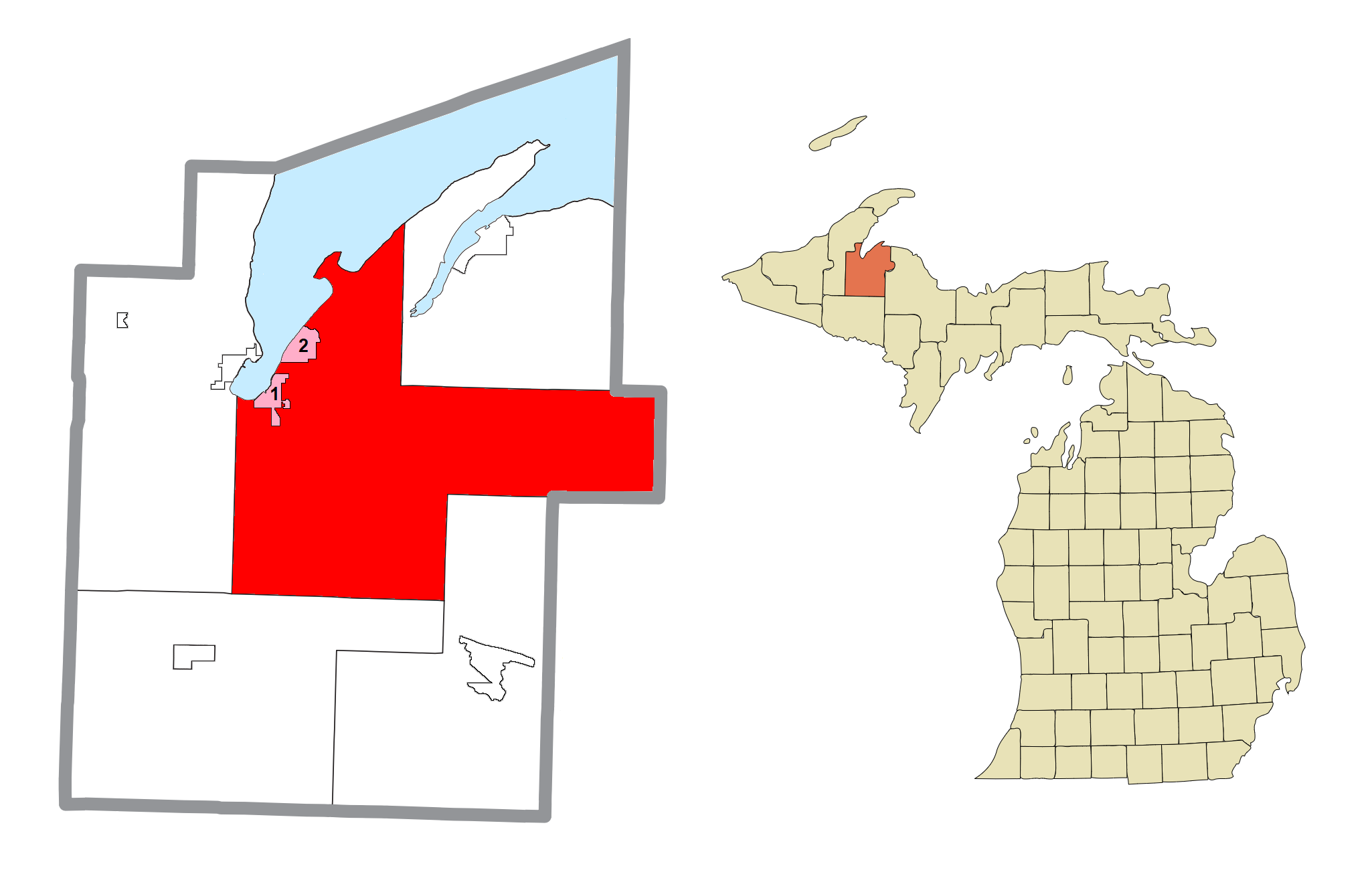
- Location within Baraga County and the administered village of L'Anse (1) and the CDP of Zeba (2)

- Location within the State of Michigan Location within the United States
- Coordinates: 46°43′41″N 88°22′18″W
- Country: United States
- State: Michigan
- County: Baraga
- Established: 1846

Government
  - Supervisor: Peter Magaraggia
  - Clerk: Kristin Kahler

Area
  - Total: 269.02 sq mi (696.76 km^{2})
  - Land: 247.40 sq mi (640.76 km^{2})
  - Water: 21.62 sq mi (56.00 km^{2})
- Elevation: 1,365 ft (416 m)

Population (2020)
  - Total: 3,551
  - Density: 14.4/sq mi (5.6/km^{2})
- Time zone: UTC-5 (Eastern (EST))
  - Summer (DST): UTC-4 (EDT)
- ZIP code(s): 49861 (Michigamme); 49908 (Baraga); 49946 (L'Anse); 49962 (Skanee)
- Area code: 906
- FIPS code: 26-45560
- GNIS feature ID: 1626587
- Website: Official website

L'Anse Township is a civil township of Baraga County in the U.S. state of Michigan. As of the 2020 census, the township population was 3,551. The township contains Mount Arvon and Mount Curwood, Michigan’s highest and second-highest points, as well as the village of L'Anse.

== Communities ==
The village of L'Anse is the only incorporated municipality in the township. There are some unincorporated communities and historic locales:

- Alberta is on U.S. Highway 41 (US 41) about 8 miles (13 km) south of the village of L'Anse.
- Bovine is a small community along US 41 about 2 miles (3 km) south of L'Anse
- Herman is a farming district near L'Anse.
- Laughs Lake is an unincorporated community in the township located on Lost Lake.
- Pequaming is on a bear-shaped point projecting into Keweenaw Bay.
- Summit is a locale just south of Herman. It was a station on the Duluth, South Shore and Atlantic Railway that opened c. 1880, 10 miles (16 km) southeast of L'Anse. It is named for its location near Mount Curwood, which until 1982 was thought to be the highest point in Michigan.
- Zeba is a census-designated place located just north of the village of L'Anse.

== History ==
The earliest written history of the area now comprising L'Anse Township dates to October 15, 1660, with the arrival of the first European on record, French Jesuit priest René Menard. Menard spent the winter in what is presently known as Pequaming on Keweenaw Bay, and left the area for Fond du Lac the following spring, never to be heard from again. He was followed by Father Claude in 1666.

Over the next 200 years, the Chippewa tribe populated the area, and attracted the attention of trappers and traders throughout the Great Lakes. The American Fur Company established a trading post at Assinins by a man known only as Dubay. The Hudson's Bay Company had established a post near Zeba in 1836, which operated for about 15 years. Other early settlers included trappers and missionaries.

The first mission in the area was established in 1833 by a Chippewa who had converted to Methodism and taken the name of John Sunday. The first mission was located on the east side of the bay north of L'Anse at Zeba, with a second opened at Ottawa Lake in 1835. In 1834, Daniel Meeker Chandler left Sault Ste. Marie and headed west on Lake Superior by canoe. He arrived at his destination, called "Ke-Wa-We-Non", on September 3, and began mission work for the Methodist Church on the east side of Keweenaw Bay. The following summer, Chandler began cutting timber for a proposed Native American village known today as Zeba.

In 1836, a Canadian named Peter (Pierre) Crebassa was appointed as representative trader by the American Fur Company, and moved the post from its original location on the west side of the bay to a site north of L'Anse at the present day Township Park. Crebassa married a Chippewa girl, Nancy, and they were instrumental in convincing Father Frederic Baraga to establish a Catholic mission, which he founded at Assinins on the west side of Keweenaw Bay in 1843.

When Michigan became the 26th state in 1837, the western two-thirds of the Upper Peninsula were included as a compromise (Ohio received the "Toledo Strip"). In March 1843, the legislature divided the Upper Peninsula into several counties. Three years later, in 1846, the act was amended to make all that part of the state "embraced between the north boundary of township 49, the line between ranges 37 and 38 west and Lake Superior, together with islands in said lake west of the county of Schoolcraft, shall be laid off as a separate county, to be known and designated as the County of Houghton." The new county included the present-day Keweenaw and Baraga counties, and was organized into three election precincts (townships) at Eagle Harbor, Houghton, and L'Anse. The following year, the area was reorganized into the townships of Copper Harbor, Eagle Harbor, Houghton, Portage, Algonquin, and L'Anse, and the first election took place in July 1848.

The coming of railroads spurred growth of the village of L'Anse in 1871, which prospered for a couple of years until the Panic of 1873.

Algonquin and L'Anse townships combined in 1875 to form Baraga County, and created the townships of Arvon, Baraga, Covington, Spurr and L'Anse.

In 1896, the village of L'Anse burned to the ground, but gradually rebuilt itself into a lumber town with the arrival of the Ford Motor Company in the early 20th century.

== Geography ==
According to the United States Census Bureau, L'Anse Township has a total area of 269.0 square miles (696.8 km^{2}), of which 247.4 square miles (640.8 km^{2}) is land and 21.6 square miles (56.0 km^{2}), or 8.03%, is water.

=== Climate ===
Climate data for Herman, Michigan (1991–2020 normals, extremes 1968–present)
| Month | Jan | Feb | Mar | Apr | May | Jun | Jul | Aug | Sep | Oct | Nov | Dec | Year |
|---|---|---|---|---|---|---|---|---|---|---|---|---|---|
| Record high °F (°C) | 54 (12) | 61 (16) | 78 (26) | 91 (33) | 93 (34) | 96 (36) | 96 (36) | 95 (35) | 95 (35) | 86 (30) | 73 (23) | 58 (14) | 96 (36) |
| Mean daily maximum °F (°C) | 19.1 (−7.2) | 23.3 (−4.8) | 34.2 (1.2) | 46.7 (8.2) | 62.1 (16.7) | 70.8 (21.6) | 74.8 (23.8) | 72.8 (22.7) | 64.5 (18.1) | 50.4 (10.2) | 35.6 (2.0) | 24.2 (−4.3) | 48.2 (9.0) |
| Daily mean °F (°C) | 12.9 (−10.6) | 15.0 (−9.4) | 24.1 (−4.4) | 36.5 (2.5) | 50.7 (10.4) | 60.0 (15.6) | 64.2 (17.9) | 62.4 (16.9) | 55.1 (12.8) | 42.7 (5.9) | 29.3 (−1.5) | 18.6 (−7.4) | 39.3 (4.1) |
| Mean daily minimum °F (°C) | 6.7 (−14.1) | 6.7 (−14.1) | 14.0 (−10.0) | 26.4 (−3.1) | 39.4 (4.1) | 49.2 (9.6) | 53.5 (11.9) | 52.0 (11.1) | 45.8 (7.7) | 35.0 (1.7) | 23.0 (−5.0) | 13.0 (−10.6) | 30.4 (−0.9) |
| Record low °F (°C) | −36 (−38) | −40 (−40) | −35 (−37) | −17 (−27) | 12 (−11) | 22 (−6) | 26 (−3) | 27 (−3) | 11 (−12) | 1 (−17) | −18 (−28) | −37 (−38) | −40 (−40) |
| Average precipitation inches (mm) | 2.21 (56) | 1.82 (46) | 2.28 (58) | 2.87 (73) | 3.40 (86) | 3.50 (89) | 4.58 (116) | 3.29 (84) | 4.19 (106) | 4.39 (112) | 3.00 (76) | 2.73 (69) | 38.26 (972) |
| Average snowfall inches (cm) | 47.8 (121) | 35.0 (89) | 27.8 (71) | 16.4 (42) | 2.2 (5.6) | 0.0 (0.0) | 0.0 (0.0) | 0.0 (0.0) | 0.2 (0.51) | 8.0 (20) | 28.7 (73) | 41.7 (106) | 207.8 (528) |
| Average precipitation days (≥ 0.01 in) | 18.2 | 13.7 | 12.7 | 12.6 | 13.2 | 12.4 | 13.1 | 12.3 | 14.4 | 16.4 | 16.8 | 17.9 | 173.7 |
| Average snowy days (≥ 0.1 in) | 19.2 | 15.0 | 10.8 | 6.3 | 1.3 | 0.0 | 0.0 | 0.0 | 0.1 | 3.4 | 12.1 | 17.9 | 86.1 |
Source: NOAA

== Demographics ==
At the 2020 U.S. census, the township had a population of 3,551.
