= Huron Mountains =

Mountain range in Michigan, United States

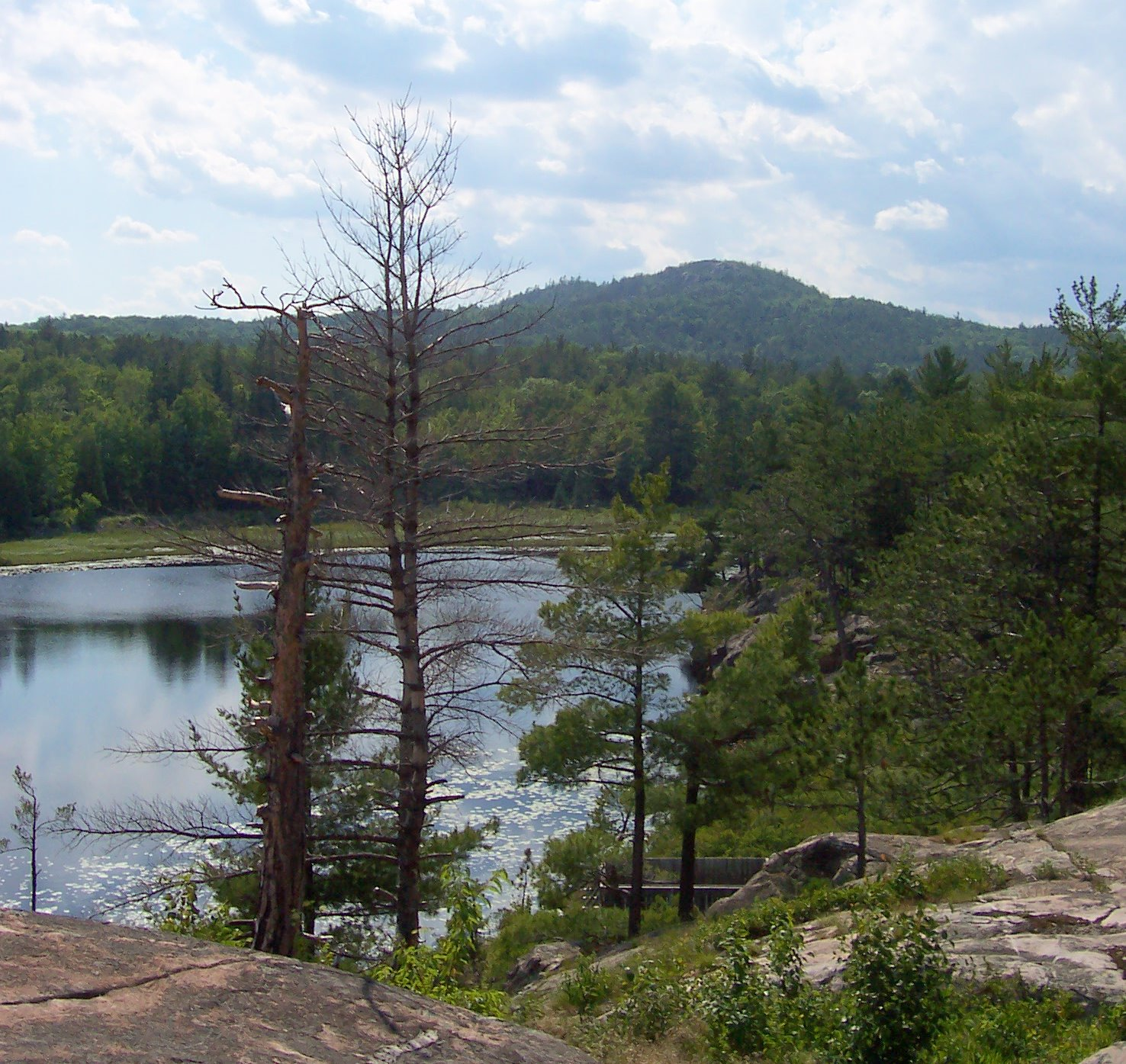
- Hogback Mountain (1,220 ft) in the Presque Isle Tract, a park within the Huron Mountain Range

Highest point
- Peak: Mount Arvon
- Elevation: 1,979 ft (603 m)
- Coordinates: 46°45′20″N 88°09′21″W

Geography
- Country: United States
- State: Michigan
- Counties: Marquette; Baraga

The Huron Mountains are located in the Upper Peninsula of the U.S. state of Michigan, mostly in Marquette County, and extending into Baraga County, overlooking Lake Superior. Their highest peak is Mount Arvon, which is the highest point in Michigan at 1,979 feet (603 m) above sea level. Nearby Mount Curwood, Michigan's second highest mountain at 1,978 feet (603 m), is also a part of the Huron Mountains.

== Geology ==
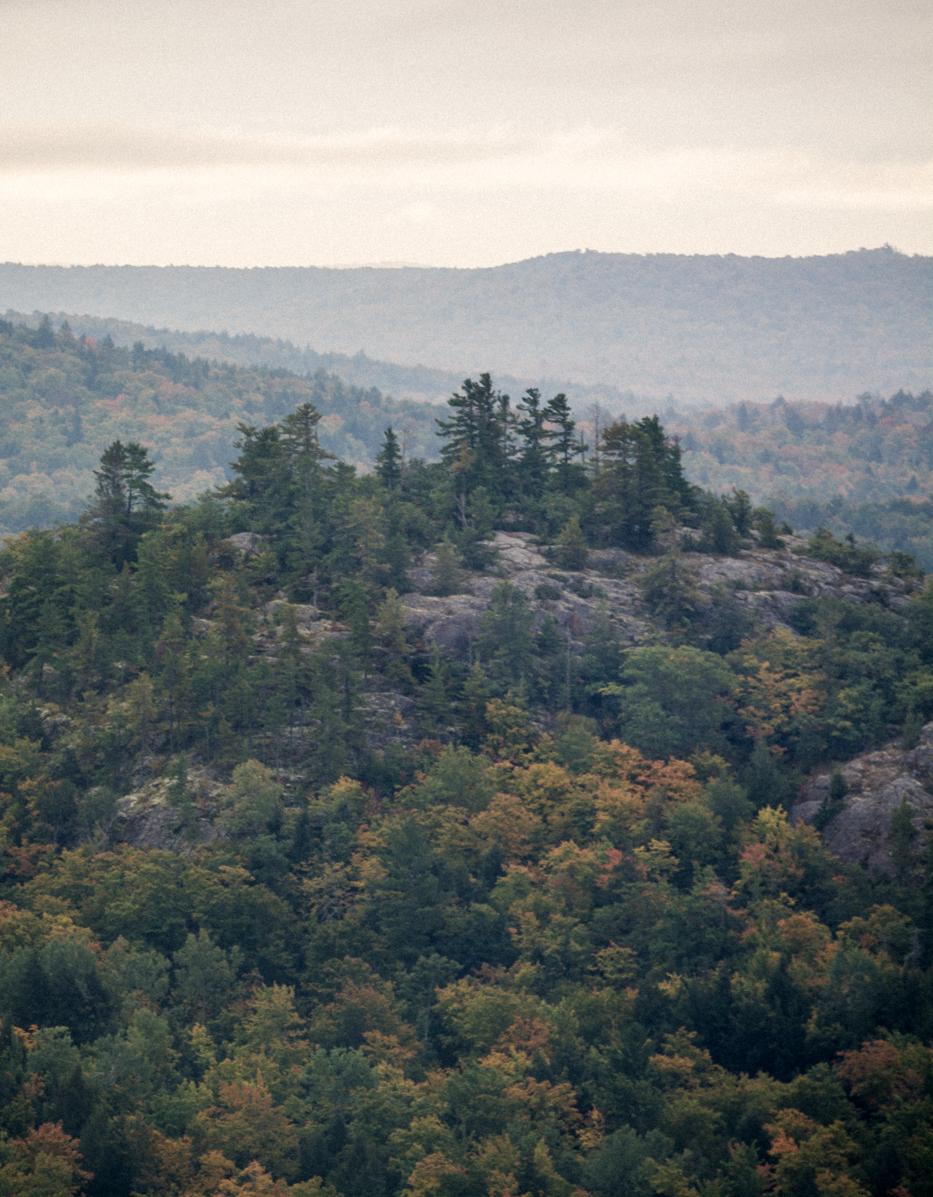
A rocky summit in the Huron Mountains

The mountains are the remnants of much higher peaks, composed of Precambrian rocks which have gone through successive periods of uplift and erosion. The outcroppings of granite and siliceous metamorphic rocks bear the evidence of more recent glacial action. Geologically, the area is part of the Canadian Shield.

Pleistocene glaciation deposited sandy loam or loamy sand glacial till on most of the terrain, and the soils, podzolized in well drained areas, are largely mapped as Munising or Keweenaw series. Loamy or silty mantles atop the till are mapped as Michigamme series, while sandy outwash often is classified as Kalkaska series.

The region is subject to heavy lake-effect snow from Lake Superior. No official weather records are maintained in the mountains, but annual snowfall averages easily exceed 200 inches (510 cm) across the entire range. Some higher elevations probably average over 250 inches (640 cm). The community of Herman receives an unofficial average of 236 inches (600 cm) per season.

== Ecology ==
The region is characterized by its boreal vegetation and unusually diverse and pristine habitats. It includes one of the largest remnants of substantially undisturbed old-growth forest in the upper Great Lakes region. Forests on the uplands are dominated by hemlock and northern hardwoods. Forests on the steep slopes and mountain ridges are dominated by pine-oak stands.

Fauna in the area includes wolves, moose, coyotes, cougar, fisher, marten, mink, white-tailed deer, gray and red foxes, porcupines, black bears, river otters and beavers.

== Conservation ==
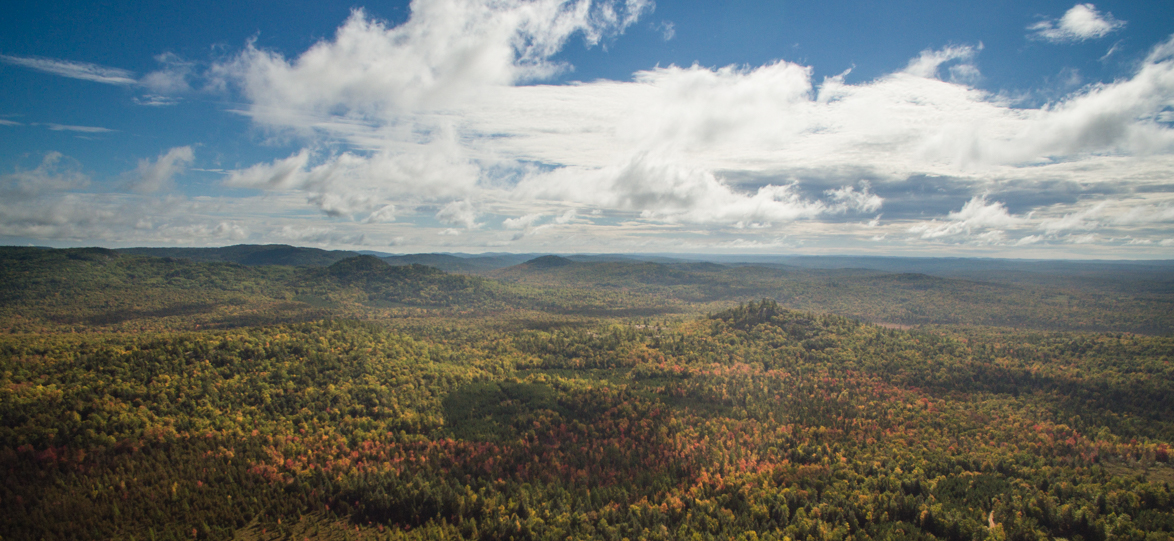
Looking east over the Huron Mountains from Skanee.

The area has been preserved largely by the influence of the highly exclusive Huron Mountain Club (HMC) which owns a large tract of land in the mountains, including a portion of the Salmon Trout River. The club commissioned noted naturalist Aldo Leopold to create a preservation plan for the area. The HMC restricts access to its property, limiting whitewater rafting on the Salmon Trout River. The HMC put Henry Ford on a waiting list. In order to gain favor with the club, Ford blocked the construction of a planned extension of highway M-35 through the mountains. After gaining membership, Ford commissioned noted architect Albert Kahn in 1929 to build a $100,000 cabin for his use.

The Huron Mountain Wildlife Foundation sponsors natural science research in the region, including the HMC lands. In the late 1950s, the Huron Mountains were a candidate for becoming a national park. However, the HMC was influential in undermining the proposal.

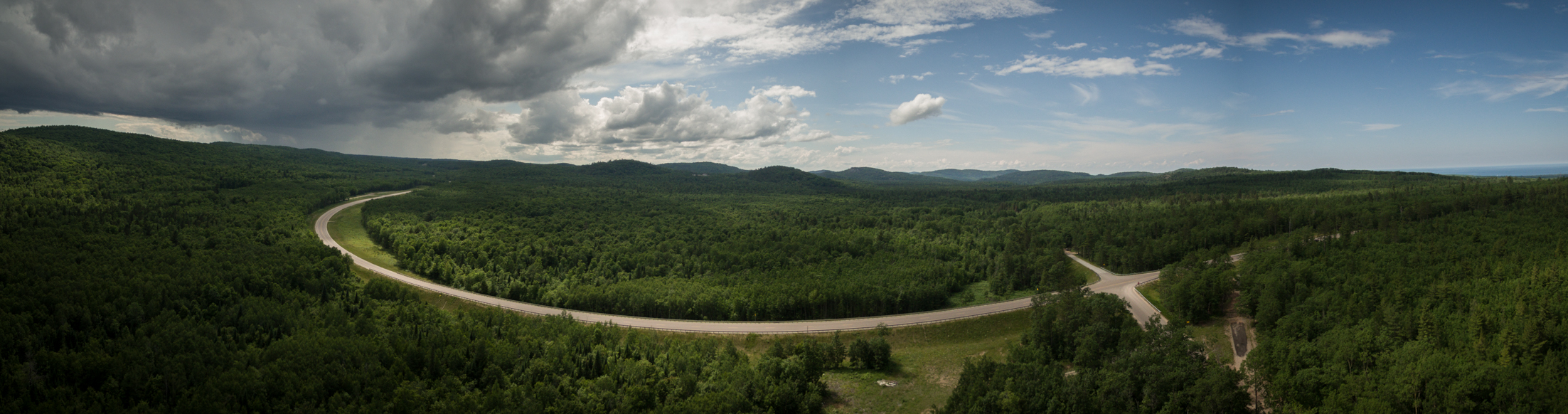
Facing west from CR 510, with AAA Road in the foreground
