= Mount Arvon =

Highest point in Michigan, United States

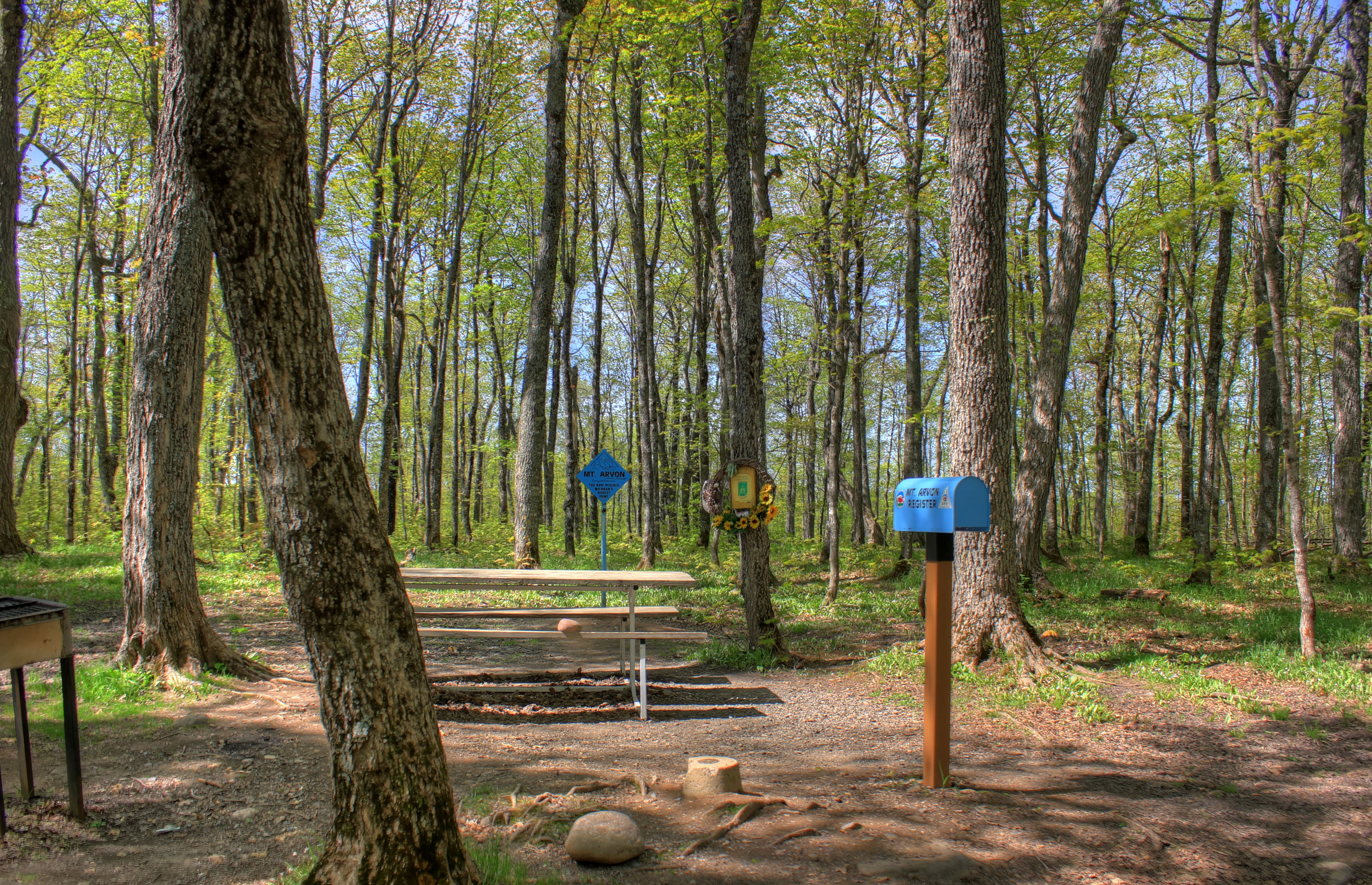
- Mount Arvon summit sign and log book (2014)

Highest point
- Elevation: 1,979 ft (603 m) NGVD 29
- Prominence: 948 ft (289 m)
- Listing: U.S. state high point 38th
- Coordinates: 46°45′21″N 88°09′20″W

Geography
- Location within Michigan
- Location: Baraga County, Michigan, U.S.
- Parent range: Huron Mountains
- Topo map: USGS Skanee South

Mount Arvon (/ɑːrvɒn/ ARR-vahn) at 1,979 feet (603 m), is either the highest or second-highest natural point in the U.S. state of Michigan. Located in L'Anse Township, Baraga County, Mount Arvon is part of the Huron Mountains. It rises about eight miles (13 km) south of Lake Superior (elevation 591 feet [180 m]). On the list of highest natural points in each U.S. state, Mount Arvon ranks 38th. It is the highest natural point in the East North Central states.

Mount Arvon is a few miles from Mount Curwood, which for years had been designated as Michigan's highest spot until a resurvey in 1982 with modern technology determined that Mount Arvon was 1 foot (0.30 m) taller than Mount Curwood. Mount Arvon is about 12 miles (19 km) east of L'Anse, although it is about a 26-mile (42 km) drive from the village; much of it lies on winding logging roads.

The soils of Mount Arvon are classic podzols which have developed on sandy loam glacial till locally overlain with a loamy or silty mantle. The Munising sandy loam-Michigamme silt loam complex is dominant.

The property is owned by the MeadWestvaco paper company but public access is allowed.

In 2018, the National Oceanic and Atmospheric Administration reported that the highest surface elevation in Michigan was the top of the Tilden Mine waste pile in Marquette County near Ishpeming. At the time, the top of the pile was at slightly above 2,000 feet (610 m), more than 20 feet (6.1 m) higher than the summit of Mount Arvon.

More recent surveys in 2025 of both peaks determined that Mount Arvon lies 0.4 feet (0.12 m) lower than Mount Curwood.

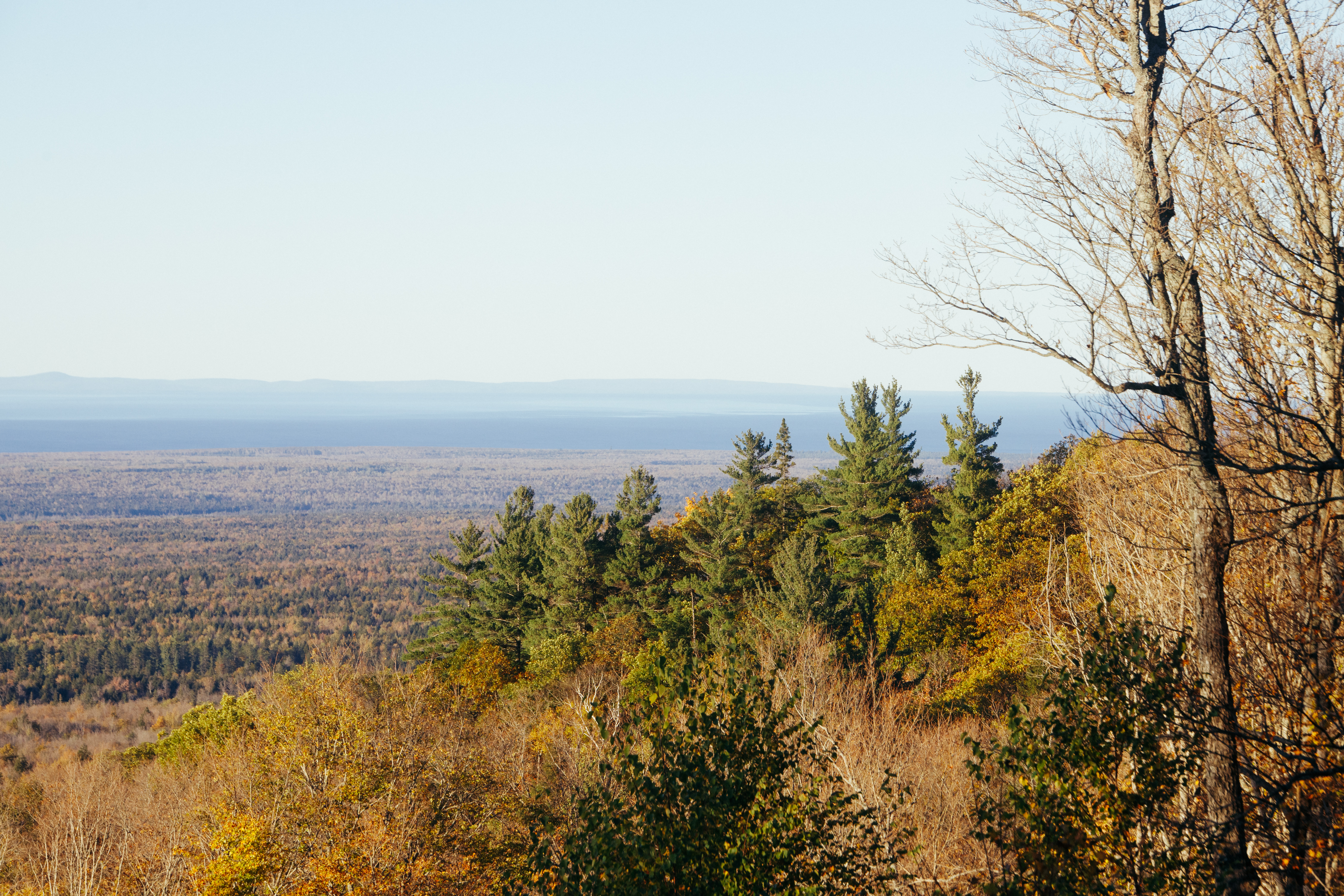
A burst of coniferous and white pine trees as seen from Mount Arvon

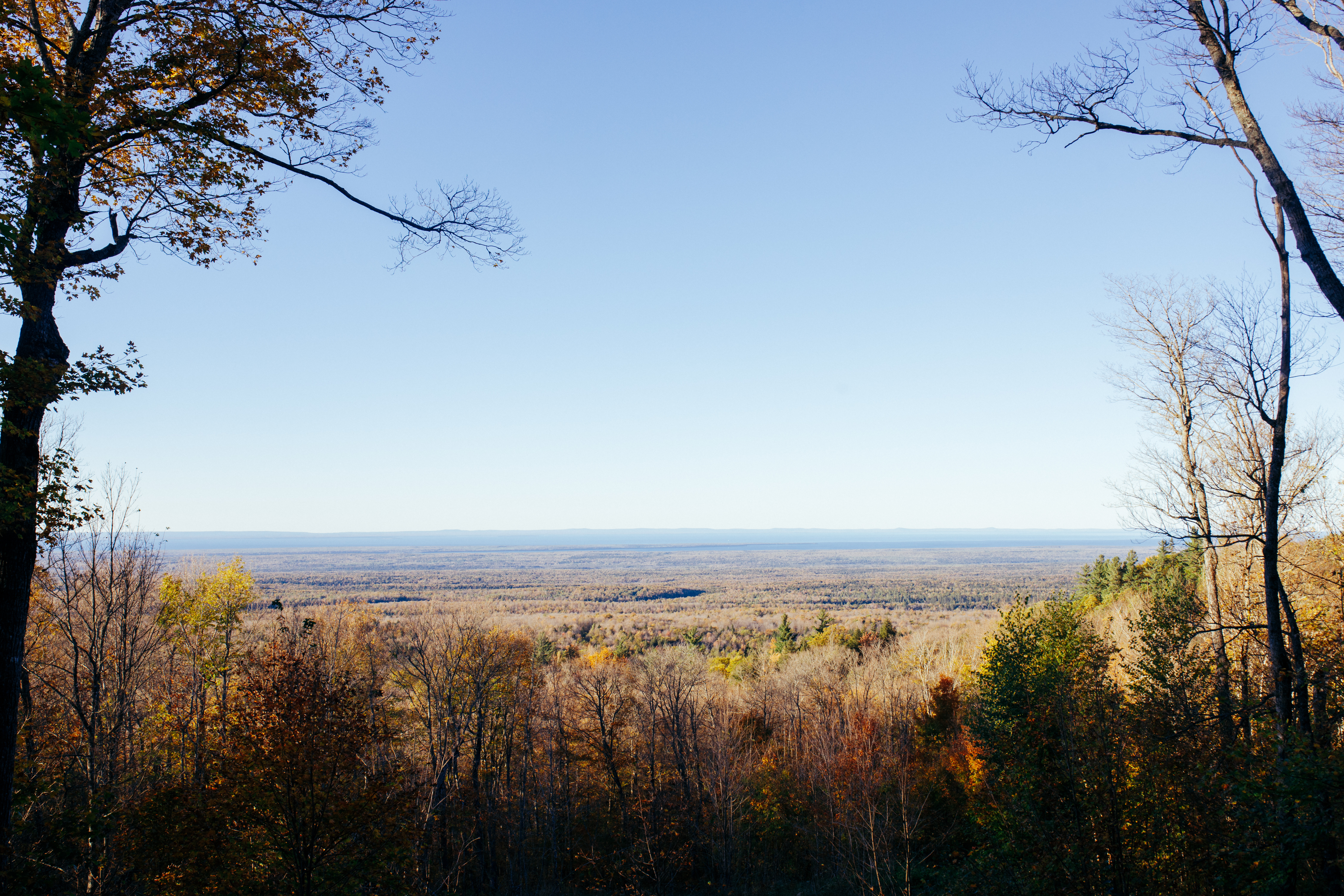
Summit of Mount Arvon facing north, early October 2025

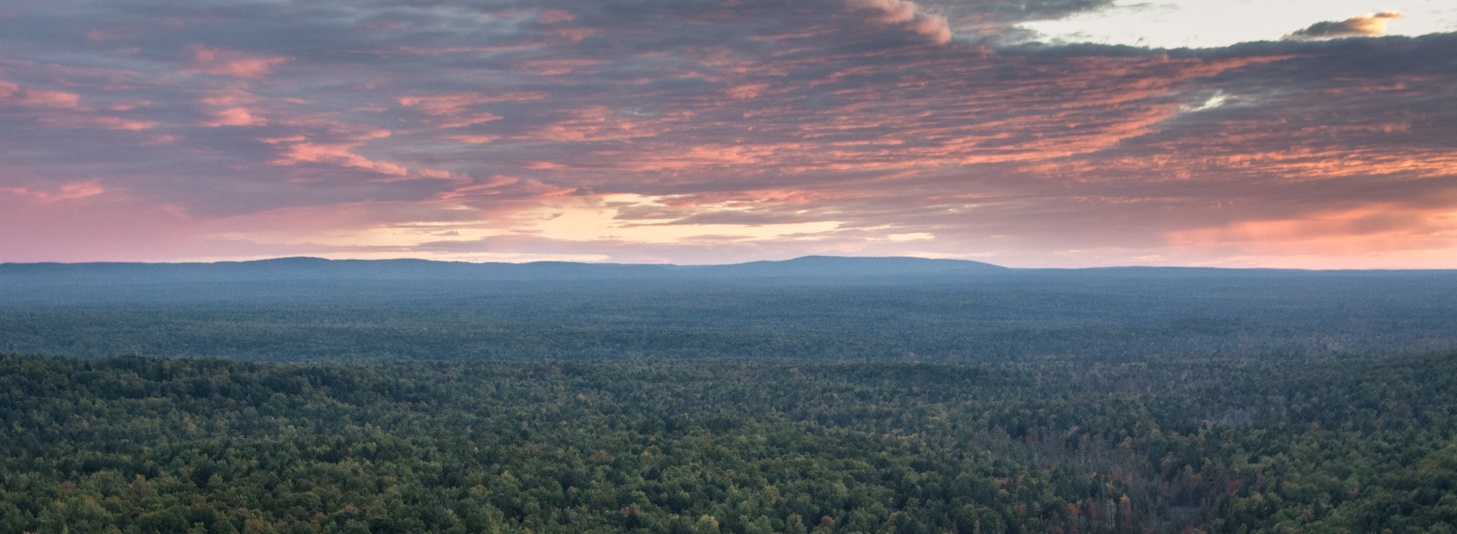
Mount Arvon viewed from the north.

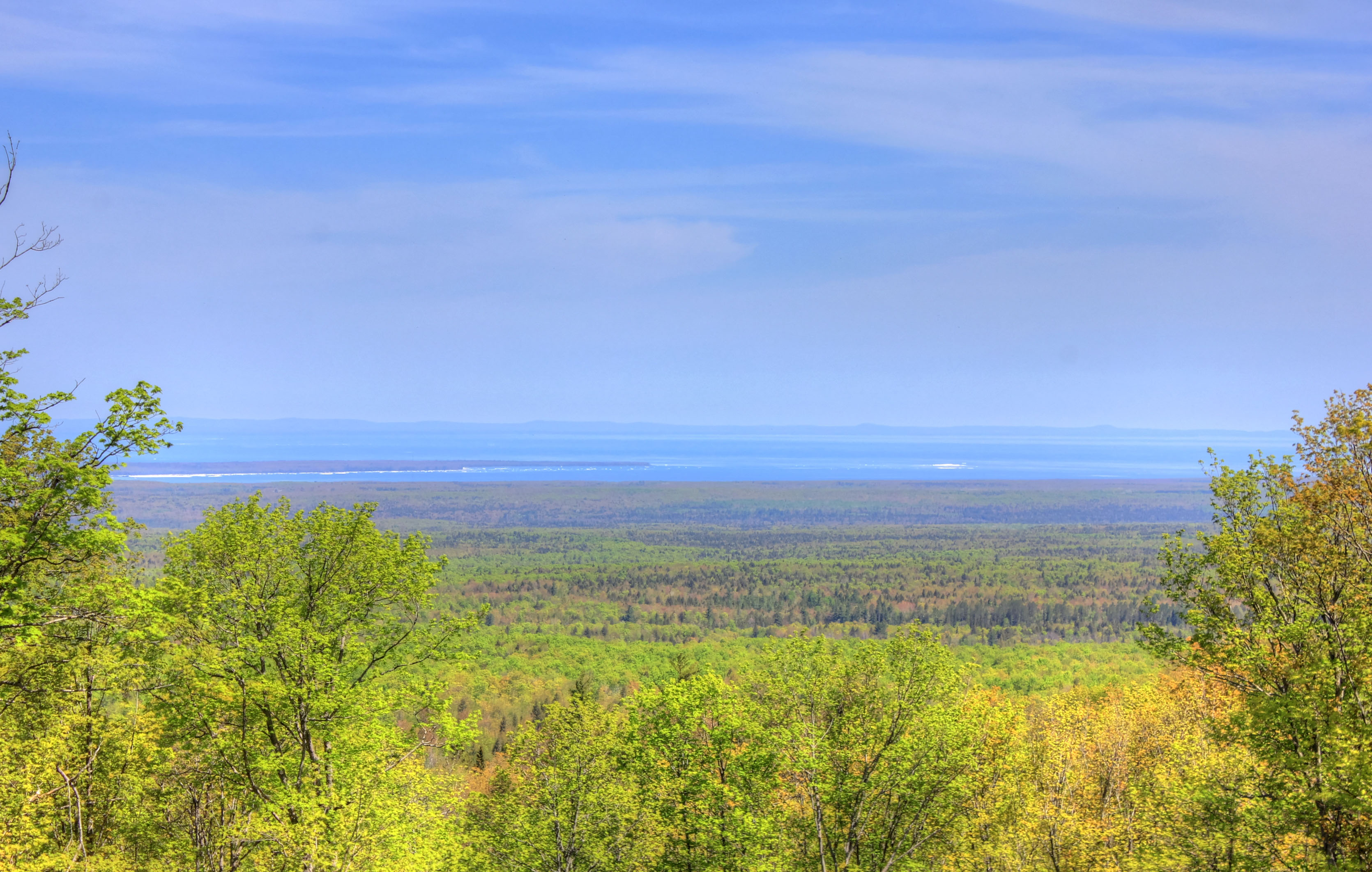
View from Mount Arvon to Lake Superior, May 2014.

== See also ==
- List of U.S. states by elevation
