= Mount Curwood =

Mountain in the Upper Peninsula of Michigan

- Location within Michigan

Highest point
- Elevation: 1,978 ft (603 m)
- Prominence: 166 ft (51 m)
- Coordinates: 46°42′11″N 88°14′22″W

Geography
- Location: Baraga County, Michigan, U.S.
- Parent range: Huron Mountains
- Topo map: USGS Mount Curwood

Mount Curwood, elevation 1,978 feet (603 m), in L'Anse Township, Baraga County, is either the highest or second-highest natural point in the U.S. state of Michigan. Mount Curwood is a part of the Huron Mountains range.

Named in honor of Michigan author James Oliver Curwood, Mount Curwood was long designated as Michigan's highest point until a survey in 1982 with modern technology determined that nearby Mount Arvon was the highest point in Michigan at 1,979 feet (603 m)—one foot taller than Mount Curwood.

More recent surveys of both peaks, taken in 2025, determined that Mount Curwood is instead 0.4 feet (12 cm) higher than Mount Arvon.

== Climate ==
Climate data for Mount Curwood 46.7093 N, 88.2423 W, Elevation: 1,919 ft (585 m) (1991–2020 normals)
Month	Jan	Feb	Mar	Apr	May	Jun	Jul	Aug	Sep	Oct	Nov	Dec	Year
Mean daily maximum °F (°C)	19.4 (−7.0)	23.6 (−4.7)	34.3 (1.3)	47.1 (8.4)	62.8 (17.1)	71.8 (22.1)	75.1 (23.9)	72.9 (22.7)	65.0 (18.3)	50.7 (10.4)	35.8 (2.1)	24.2 (−4.3)	48.6 (9.2)
Daily mean °F (°C)	12.1 (−11.1)	14.2 (−9.9)	23.4 (−4.8)	36.2 (2.3)	50.4 (10.2)	60.1 (15.6)	63.8 (17.7)	61.8 (16.6)	54.7 (12.6)	42.1 (5.6)	28.7 (−1.8)	17.8 (−7.9)	38.8 (3.8)
Mean daily minimum °F (°C)	4.8 (−15.1)	4.7 (−15.2)	12.5 (−10.8)	25.3 (−3.7)	38.0 (3.3)	48.3 (9.1)	52.4 (11.3)	50.8 (10.4)	44.5 (6.9)	33.5 (0.8)	21.7 (−5.7)	11.5 (−11.4)	29.0 (−1.7)
Average precipitation inches (mm)	2.06 (52)	1.73 (44)	2.20 (56)	2.94 (75)	3.40 (86)	3.63 (92)	4.51 (115)	3.47 (88)	4.10 (104)	4.17 (106)	2.78 (71)	2.43 (62)	37.42 (951)
Source: PRISM Climate Group
