= Herman, Michigan =

- Unincorporated community
- Location within the state of Michigan
- Coordinates: 46°40′01″N 88°22′01″W
- Country: United States
- State: Michigan
- County: Baraga
- Township: L'Anse
- Settled: 1901
- Elevation: 1,667 ft (508 m)
- Time zone: UTC−5 (Eastern (EST))
  - Summer (DST): UTC−4 (EDT)
- ZIP code: 49946
- Area code: 906
- GNIS feature ID: 628133

Herman is an unincorporated community in L'Anse Township of Baraga County in the U.S. state of Michigan. It was established in 1901 along a branch of the Duluth, South Shore and Atlantic Railway approximately midway between Nestoria and L'Anse. A post office opened January 13, 1903, and was discontinued on December 5, 1970.

The settlement was founded by Finnish-born Herman Keranen, who had been working in the lumber camps when he bought several 40-acre (160,000 m^{2}) plots and constructed a crude log cabin. With the money he earned from lumbering, he established the largest and most productive farm in the area, which led to the community being named for him. For a number of years, the primary access to the area was via the Duluth, South Shore and Atlantic Railroad Company. A school was built in 1903, and a post office followed in 1904. The Herman Athletic Association was organized in 1912, and a farmer's cooperative association in 1919. The area boasted at least one store and one mercantile business.

On December 19, 1996, the town received what was then the single largest snowfall in Michigan history, with 30 inches (76 cm) falling in the single day. It received 34 inches (860 mm) in a 24-hour period during the March 13–17, 2026 North American storm complex.

Other early residents included Matt Anderson, Gust Kontio, Erkki Kayramo, Nels Majhannu, Jacob Kuusisto, Henry Pasanen, Joseph Pekkala and Eli Korpi.

== Climate ==
Climate data for Herman, Michigan (1991–2020 normals, extremes 1968–present)
Month	Jan	Feb	Mar	Apr	May	Jun	Jul	Aug	Sep	Oct	Nov	Dec	Year
Record high °F (°C)	54 (12)	61 (16)	78 (26)	91 (33)	93 (34)	96 (36)	96 (36)	95 (35)	95 (35)	86 (30)	73 (23)	58 (14)	96 (36)
Mean maximum °F (°C)	37.8 (3.2)	44.3 (6.8)	56.4 (13.6)	70.6 (21.4)	83.4 (28.6)	86.5 (30.3)	86.6 (30.3)	84.7 (29.3)	80.9 (27.2)	73.5 (23.1)	54.7 (12.6)	42.0 (5.6)	88.7 (31.5)
Mean daily maximum °F (°C)	19.1 (−7.2)	23.3 (−4.8)	34.2 (1.2)	46.7 (8.2)	62.1 (16.7)	70.8 (21.6)	74.8 (23.8)	72.8 (22.7)	64.5 (18.1)	50.4 (10.2)	35.6 (2.0)	24.2 (−4.3)	48.2 (9.0)
Daily mean °F (°C)	12.9 (−10.6)	15.0 (−9.4)	24.1 (−4.4)	36.5 (2.5)	50.7 (10.4)	60.0 (15.6)	64.2 (17.9)	62.4 (16.9)	55.1 (12.8)	42.7 (5.9)	29.3 (−1.5)	18.6 (−7.4)	39.3 (4.1)
Mean daily minimum °F (°C)	6.7 (−14.1)	6.7 (−14.1)	14.0 (−10.0)	26.4 (−3.1)	39.4 (4.1)	49.2 (9.6)	53.5 (11.9)	52.0 (11.1)	45.8 (7.7)	35.0 (1.7)	23.0 (−5.0)	13.0 (−10.6)	30.4 (−0.9)
Mean minimum °F (°C)	−16.2 (−26.8)	−18.0 (−27.8)	−15.7 (−26.5)	5.8 (−14.6)	23.1 (−4.9)	31.7 (−0.2)	37.7 (3.2)	37.3 (2.9)	28.8 (−1.8)	20.3 (−6.5)	3.8 (−15.7)	−10.5 (−23.6)	−22.5 (−30.3)
Record low °F (°C)	−36 (−38)	−40 (−40)	−35 (−37)	−17 (−27)	12 (−11)	22 (−6)	26 (−3)	27 (−3)	11 (−12)	1 (−17)	−18 (−28)	−37 (−38)	−40 (−40)
Average precipitation inches (mm)	2.21 (56)	1.82 (46)	2.28 (58)	2.87 (73)	3.40 (86)	3.50 (89)	4.58 (116)	3.29 (84)	4.19 (106)	4.39 (112)	3.00 (76)	2.73 (69)	38.26 (972)
Average snowfall inches (cm)	47.8 (121)	35.0 (89)	27.8 (71)	16.4 (42)	2.2 (5.6)	0.0 (0.0)	0.0 (0.0)	0.0 (0.0)	0.2 (0.51)	8.0 (20)	28.7 (73)	41.7 (106)	207.8 (528)
Average precipitation days (≥ 0.01 in)	18.2	13.7	12.7	12.6	13.2	12.4	13.1	12.3	14.4	16.4	16.8	17.9	173.7
Average snowy days (≥ 0.1 in)	19.2	15.0	10.8	6.3	1.3	0.0	0.0	0.0	0.1	3.4	12.1	17.9	86.1
Source: NOAA
