= Keweenaw Bay, Michigan =

Unincorporated community in Michigan, United States

Coordinates: 46°51′37″N 88°28′54″W

Keweenaw Bay is an unincorporated community in Baraga County in northern Michigan.

The community is on the shore of Keweenaw Bay on US Route 41. The community of Baraga is approximately 6.5 miles to the south and Chassell on Portage Lake in Houghton County is approximately 14 miles to the north on Route 41.

== History ==
A land patent was issued to Frank Laffrenire by US President Ulysses S. Grant on May 10, 1875. The settlement was known as "Leffenire" until 1898. Annie La Fernier became the first postmaster on March 26, 1898, with the office named "La Fernier". However, Annie had it changed on June 1, 1901, to the name of the large bay on which the village was located. The post office was discontinued on January 16, 1976, and became a CPO of Baraga. It was also a station on the Duluth, South Shore and Atlantic Railway. "Keweenaw" (kewawenon) was a Native American word for portage.
