= Baraga County, Michigan =

County in Michigan, United States

- County
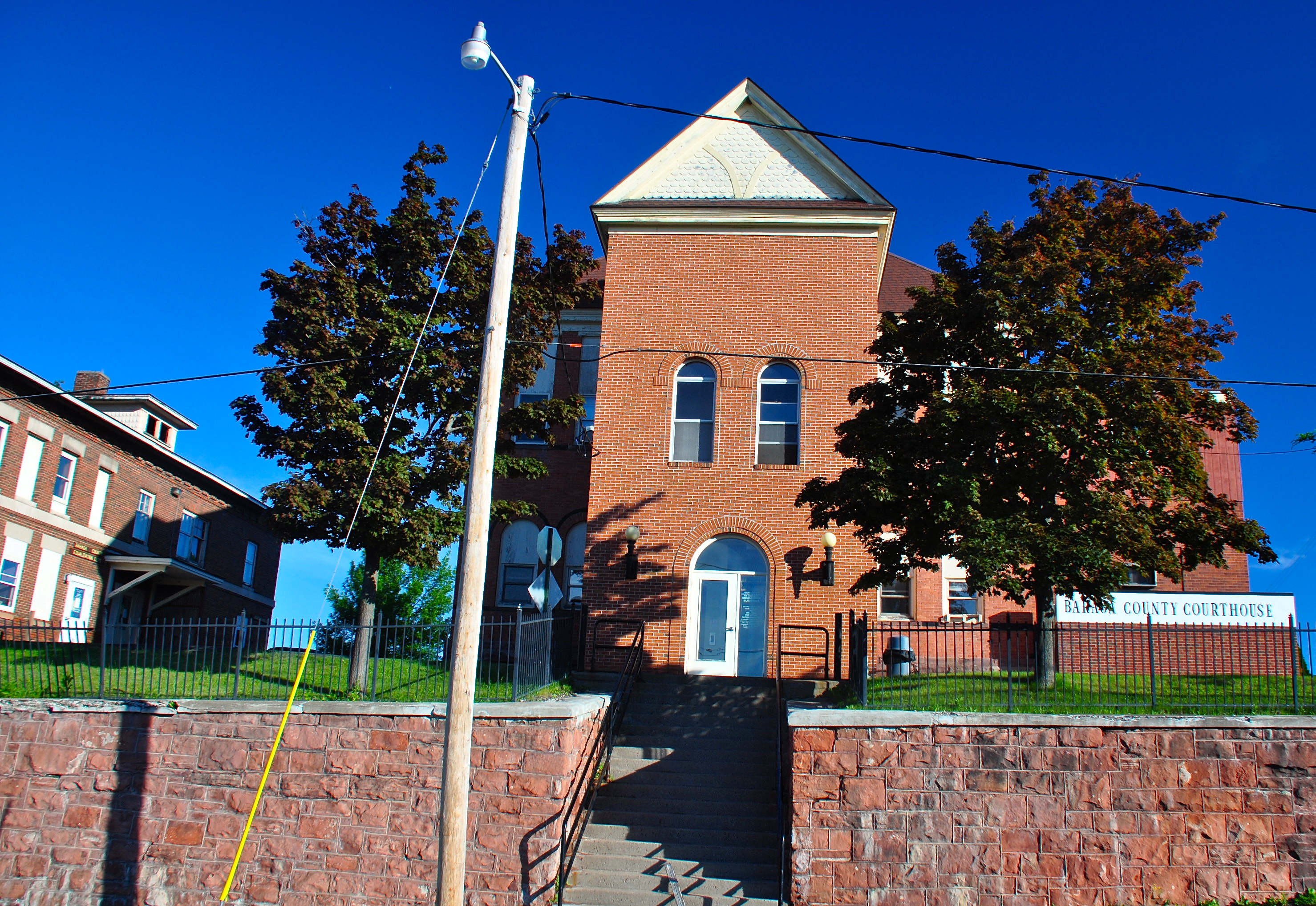
- Baraga County Courthouse and Annex (July 2014)

- Flag Seal

- Location within the U.S. state of Michigan
- Coordinates: 46.72°N 88.34°W
- Country: United States
- State: Michigan
- Founded: February 19, 1875
- Named for: Frederic Baraga
- Seat: L'Anse
- Largest village: Baraga

Area
  - Total: 1,069 sq mi (2,770 km^{2})
  - Land: 898 sq mi (2,330 km^{2})
  - Water: 171 sq mi (440 km^{2}) 16%

Population (2020)
  - Total: 8,158
  - Estimate (2025): 8,169 ▲
  - Density: 9.08/sq mi (3.51/km^{2})
- Time zone: UTC−5 (Eastern)
  - Summer (DST): UTC−4 (EDT)
- Congressional district: 1st
- Website: keweenawbay.org

Baraga County (/ˈbɛərəɡə/ BAIR-ə-gə) is a county in the Upper Peninsula in the U.S. state of Michigan. As of the 2020 census, the population was 8,158, making it Michigan's fifth-least populous county. The county seat is L'Anse. The county is named after Bishop Frederic Baraga, a Catholic missionary who ministered to the Ojibwa Indians in the Michigan Territory. The L'Anse Indian Reservation of the Ojibwa is within Baraga County.

== Geography ==
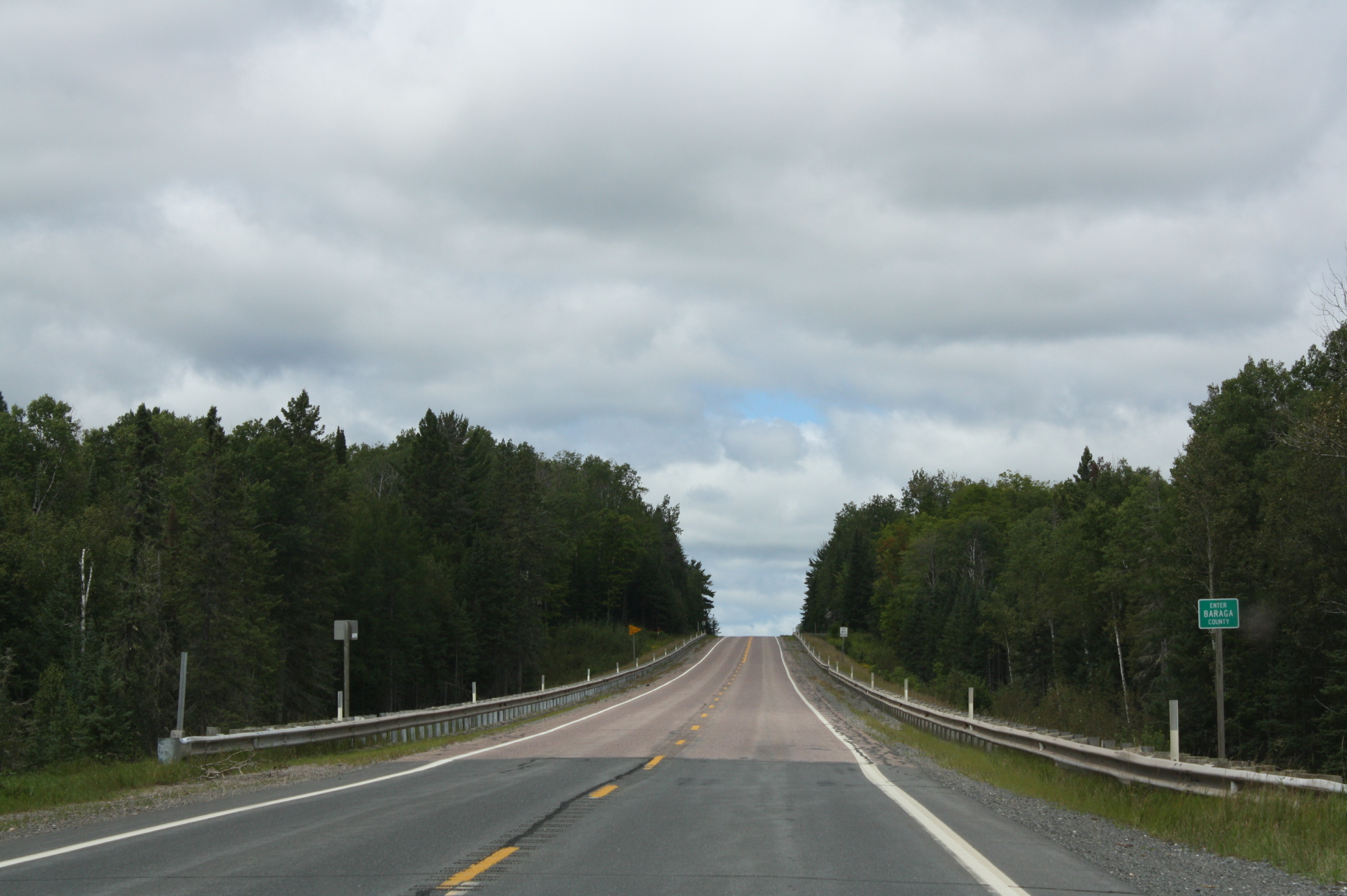
Entrance sign for Baraga County on U.S. Route 141

According to the U.S. Census Bureau, the county has a total area of 1,069 square miles (2,770 km^{2}), of which 898 square miles (2,330 km^{2}) is land and 171 square miles (440 km^{2}) (16%) is water.

The county is located in the state's Upper Peninsula on the shore of Lake Superior, at the southeast base of the Keweenaw Peninsula. The villages of Baraga and L'Anse are located at the base of Lake Superior's Keweenaw Bay. Point Abbaye projects north into the lake, enclosing Huron Bay. The eastern two-thirds of the county includes much of the Huron Mountains, including Mount Arvon—the highest natural point in Michigan at 1,979 feet (603 m).

=== Major highways ===
- US 41: runs north–south through the upper central part of county. The highway enters at the northeast corner of the county on the west shore of Keweenaw Bay and runs south along the shoreline to Baraga and L'Anse, then turns inland (south) past Alberta, then east through Nestoria and Three Lakes. It exits into Marquette County at Imperial Heights.
- US 141: runs south from its intersection with US-41 south of Alberta into Iron County.
- M-28: enters the west side of the county then runs east and east-northeast to the intersection with US-141 at Covington.
- M-38: runs east–west through the northwest corner of county. It enters from Alston in Houghton County, then runs east to intersection with US-41 at Baraga.

=== Adjacent counties ===
- Marquette County (east)
- Iron County (south)
- Houghton County (west)

=== National protected areas ===
- Keweenaw National Historical Park (part)
- Ottawa National Forest (part)

== Communities ==
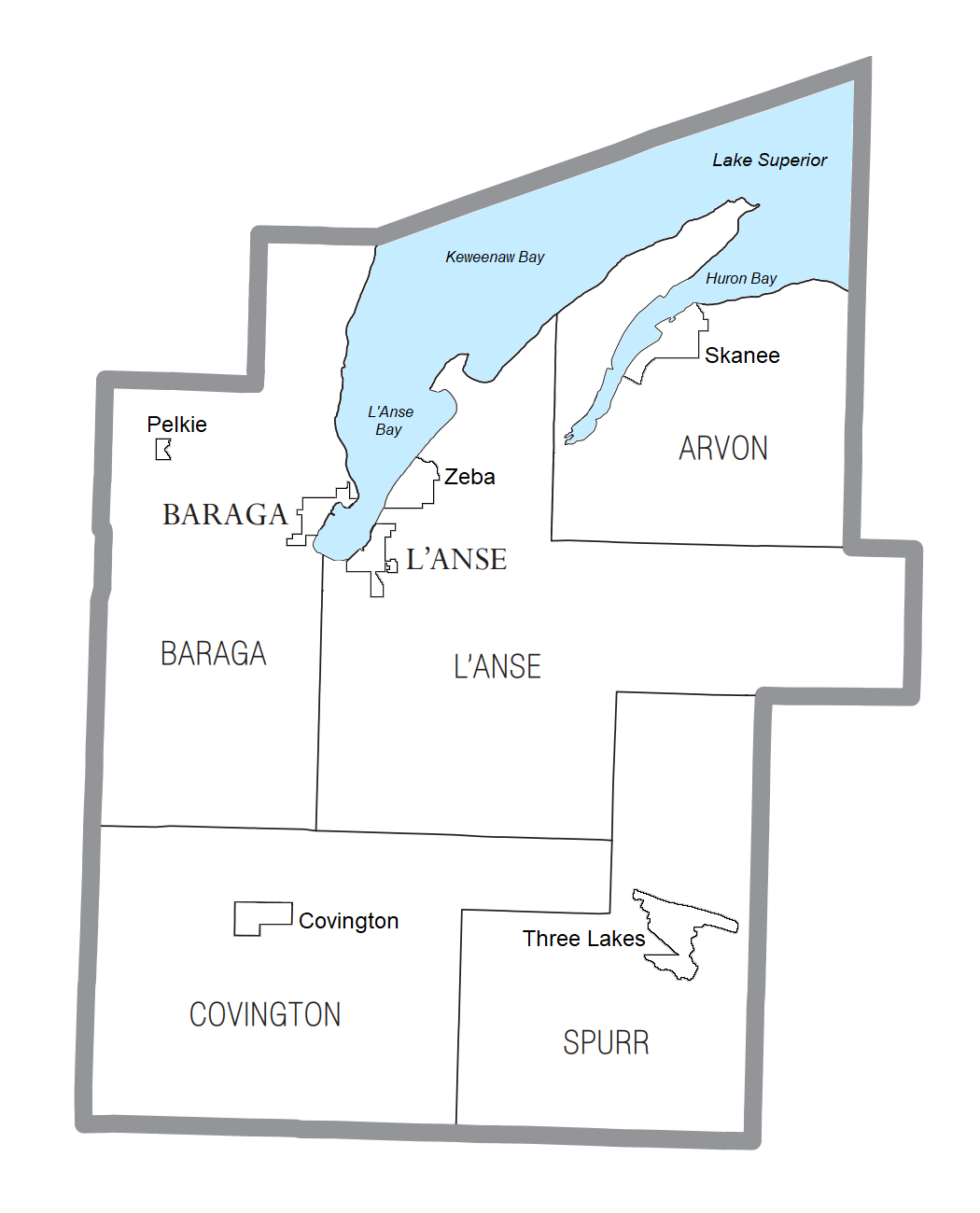
U.S. Census data map showing local municipal boundaries within Baraga County, as well as several CDP boundaries.

=== Villages ===
- Baraga
- L'Anse (county seat)

=== Civil townships ===
- Arvon Township
- Baraga Township
- Covington Township
- L'Anse Township
- Spurr Township

=== Census-designated places ===
- Covington
- Pelkie
- Skanee
- Three Lakes
- Zeba

=== Other unincorporated communities ===
- Alberta
- Arnheim
- Assinins
- Aura
- Bear Town
- Bovine
- Glovers Corner
- Herman
- Imperial Heights
- Keweenaw Bay
- McComb Corner
- Nestoria
- Pequaming
- Tioga
- Tunis
- Vermilac
- Watton

=== Indian reservations ===
- The L'Anse Indian Reservation occupies two sections of Baraga County within portions of Baraga, L'Anse, and Arvon townships. The reservation also has very small portion in Chocolay Charter Township in neighboring Marquette County to the east.

== Demographics ==
Historical population
Census	Pop.	Note	%±
1880	1,804		—
1890	3,036		68.3%
1900	4,320		42.3%
1910	6,127		41.8%
1920	7,662		25.1%
1930	9,168		19.7%
1940	9,356		2.1%
1950	8,037		−14.1%
1960	7,151		−11.0%
1970	7,789		8.9%
1980	8,484		8.9%
1990	7,954		−6.2%
2000	8,746		10.0%
2010	8,860		1.3%
2020	8,158		−7.9%
2025 (est.)	8,169	▲	0.1%
US Decennial Census; 1790–1960 1900–1990; 1990–2000 2010–2018

=== Racial and ethnic composition ===
Baraga County, Michigan – Racial and ethnic composition Note: the US Census treats Hispanic/Latino as an ethnic category. This table excludes Latinos from the racial categories and assigns them to a separate category. Hispanics/Latinos may be of any race.
Race / Ethnicity (NH = Non-Hispanic)	Pop 1980	Pop 1990	Pop 2000	Pop 2010	Pop 2020	% 1980	% 1990	% 2000	% 2010	% 2020
White alone (NH)	7,629	6,950	6,849	6,605	5,753	89.92%	87.38%	78.31%	74.55%	70.52%
Black or African American alone (NH)	56	48	432	635	598	0.66%	0.60%	4.94%	7.17%	7.33%
Native American or Alaska Native alone (NH)	754	910	1,040	1,130	1,083	8.89%	11.44%	11.89%	12.75%	13.28%
Asian alone (NH)	8	10	23	13	15	0.09%	0.13%	0.26%	0.15%	0.18%
Native Hawaiian or Pacific Islander alone (NH)	x	x	1	0	3	x	x	0.01%	0.00%	0.04%
Other race alone (NH)	0	2	3	6	22	0.00%	0.03%	0.03%	0.07%	0.27%
Mixed race or Multiracial (NH)	x	x	317	385	582	x	x	3.62%	4.35%	7.13%
Hispanic or Latino (any race)	37	34	81	86	102	0.44%	0.43%	0.93%	0.97%	1.25%
Total	8,484	7,954	8,746	8,860	8,158	100.00%	100.00%	100.00%	100.00%	100.00%

=== 2020 census ===
As of the 2020 census, the county had a population of 8,158. The median age was 46.3 years. 17.7% of residents were under the age of 18 and 23.4% of residents were 65 years of age or older. For every 100 females there were 122.8 males, and for every 100 females age 18 and over there were 129.6 males age 18 and over.

The racial makeup of the county was 70.8% White, 7.4% Black or African American, 13.4% American Indian and Alaska Native, 0.2% Asian, <0.1% Native Hawaiian and Pacific Islander, 0.4% from some other race, and 7.7% from two or more races. Hispanic or Latino residents of any race comprised 1.3% of the population.

<0.1% of residents lived in urban areas, while 100.0% lived in rural areas.

There were 3,328 households in the county, of which 23.6% had children under the age of 18 living in them. Of all households, 43.3% were married-couple households, 23.8% were households with a male householder and no spouse or partner present, and 25.2% were households with a female householder and no spouse or partner present. About 34.6% of all households were made up of individuals and 16.1% had someone living alone who was 65 years of age or older.

There were 5,052 housing units, of which 34.1% were vacant. Among occupied housing units, 77.1% were owner-occupied and 22.9% were renter-occupied. The homeowner vacancy rate was 2.5% and the rental vacancy rate was 13.2%.

=== 2010 census ===
The 2010 United States census indicated Baraga County had a population of 8,860. This was an increase of 114 people from 2000. In 2010 there were 3,444 households and 2,209 families in the county. The population density was 10 people per square mile (3.9 people/km^{2}). There were 5,270 housing units at an average density of 6 per square mile (2.3/km^{2}). Among the county, 75.0% of the population was White, 13.1% Native American, 7.2% Black or African American, 0.1% Asian, 0.2% of some other race and 4.4% of two or more races; 1.0% were Hispanic or Latino (of any race). Additionally, 22.5% were of Finnish, 9.1% German, 8.8% French, French Canadian or Cajun, 5.6% English and 5.5% Irish ancestry.

In 2010, there were 3,444 households, out of which 25.2% had children under the age of 18 living with them, 47.4% were married couples living together, 10.9% had a female householder with no husband present, and 35.9% were non-families. Of all households, 31.6% were made up of individuals, and 13% had someone living alone who was 65 years of age or older. The average household size was 2.28 and the average family size was 2.82. The age distribution of the county population was the following: 20.2% were under the age of 18, 7% from 18 to 24, 25.7% from 25 to 44, 29.7% from 45 to 64, and 17.2% who were 65 years of age or older. The median age was 42.9 years; 54.9% of the population was male, 45.1% was female.

As of 2010, the median income for a household in the county was $40,115, and the median income for a family was $50,996. The per capita income for the county was $19,076. About 9.5% of families and 13% of the population were below the poverty line, including 19.2% of those under age 18 and 6.7% of those age 65 or over.

=== 2021 estimates ===
By the 2021 census estimates, its median household income was $45,792.

== Government ==
Baraga County has tended to support Republican candidates. Since 1884 its voters have selected the Republican Party nominee in 67% (24 of 36) of the national elections through 2024, and in all presidential elections since 2000. Additionally, from 1896 to 1996, the county supported the statewide winner each time except for 1988, making Baraga County a 20th-century bellwether for Michigan.

United States presidential election results for Baraga County, Michigan
Year	Republican		Democratic		Third party(ies)	
Year	No.	%	No.	%	No.	%
1884	396	56.33%	307	43.67%	0	0.00%
1888	389	48.69%	406	50.81%	4	0.50%
1892	375	36.76%	630	61.76%	15	1.47%
1896	611	55.90%	459	41.99%	23	2.10%
1900	606	63.92%	333	35.13%	9	0.95%
1904	564	73.34%	185	24.06%	20	2.60%
1908	765	73.98%	232	22.44%	37	3.58%
1912	295	25.97%	280	24.65%	561	49.38%
1916	748	57.19%	462	35.32%	98	7.49%
1920	1,368	74.67%	304	16.59%	160	8.73%
1924	1,714	71.84%	208	8.72%	464	19.45%
1928	2,203	65.27%	1,046	30.99%	126	3.73%
1932	1,917	46.92%	2,016	49.34%	153	3.74%
1936	2,035	46.94%	2,218	51.16%	82	1.89%
1940	2,512	53.48%	2,152	45.82%	33	0.70%
1944	1,829	49.25%	1,874	50.46%	11	0.30%
1948	1,878	50.11%	1,656	44.18%	214	5.71%
1952	2,103	57.29%	1,540	41.95%	28	0.76%
1956	1,968	55.51%	1,574	44.40%	3	0.08%
1960	1,861	48.51%	1,964	51.20%	11	0.29%
1964	1,160	31.05%	2,568	68.74%	8	0.21%
1968	1,508	45.45%	1,680	50.63%	130	3.92%
1972	1,905	54.93%	1,517	43.74%	46	1.33%
1976	1,788	49.47%	1,778	49.20%	48	1.33%
1980	2,046	52.18%	1,609	41.04%	266	6.78%
1984	1,965	51.82%	1,818	47.94%	9	0.24%
1988	1,630	47.88%	1,753	51.50%	21	0.62%
1992	1,160	31.96%	1,695	46.69%	775	21.35%
1996	1,209	36.70%	1,601	48.60%	484	14.69%
2000	1,836	54.11%	1,400	41.26%	157	4.63%
2004	1,977	53.66%	1,660	45.06%	47	1.28%
2008	1,846	50.53%	1,725	47.22%	82	2.24%
2012	1,866	53.47%	1,574	45.10%	50	1.43%
2016	2,158	61.34%	1,156	32.86%	204	5.80%
2020	2,512	62.07%	1,478	36.52%	57	1.41%
2024	2,779	64.15%	1,488	34.35%	65	1.50%

United States Senate election results for Baraga County, Michigan1
Year	Republican		Democratic		Third party(ies)	
Year	No.	%	No.	%	No.	%
2024	2,698	63.54%	1,468	34.57%	80	1.88%

Michigan Gubernatorial election results for Baraga County
Year	Republican		Democratic		Third party(ies)	
Year	No.	%	No.	%	No.	%
2022	2,056	59.70%	1,329	38.59%	59	1.71%

Baraga County operates the county jail, maintains rural roads, operates the major local courts, records deeds, mortgages, and vital records, administers public health regulations, and participates with the state in the provision of social services. The county board of commissioners controls the budget and has limited authority to make laws or ordinances. In Michigan, most local government functions – police and fire, building and zoning, tax assessment, street maintenance etc. – are the responsibility of individual cities and townships.

== See also ==
- List of Michigan State Historic Sites in Baraga County, Michigan
- National Register of Historic Places listings in Baraga County, Michigan
