= Keweenaw Bay =

Bay of Lake Superior in the Upper Peninsula of Michigan

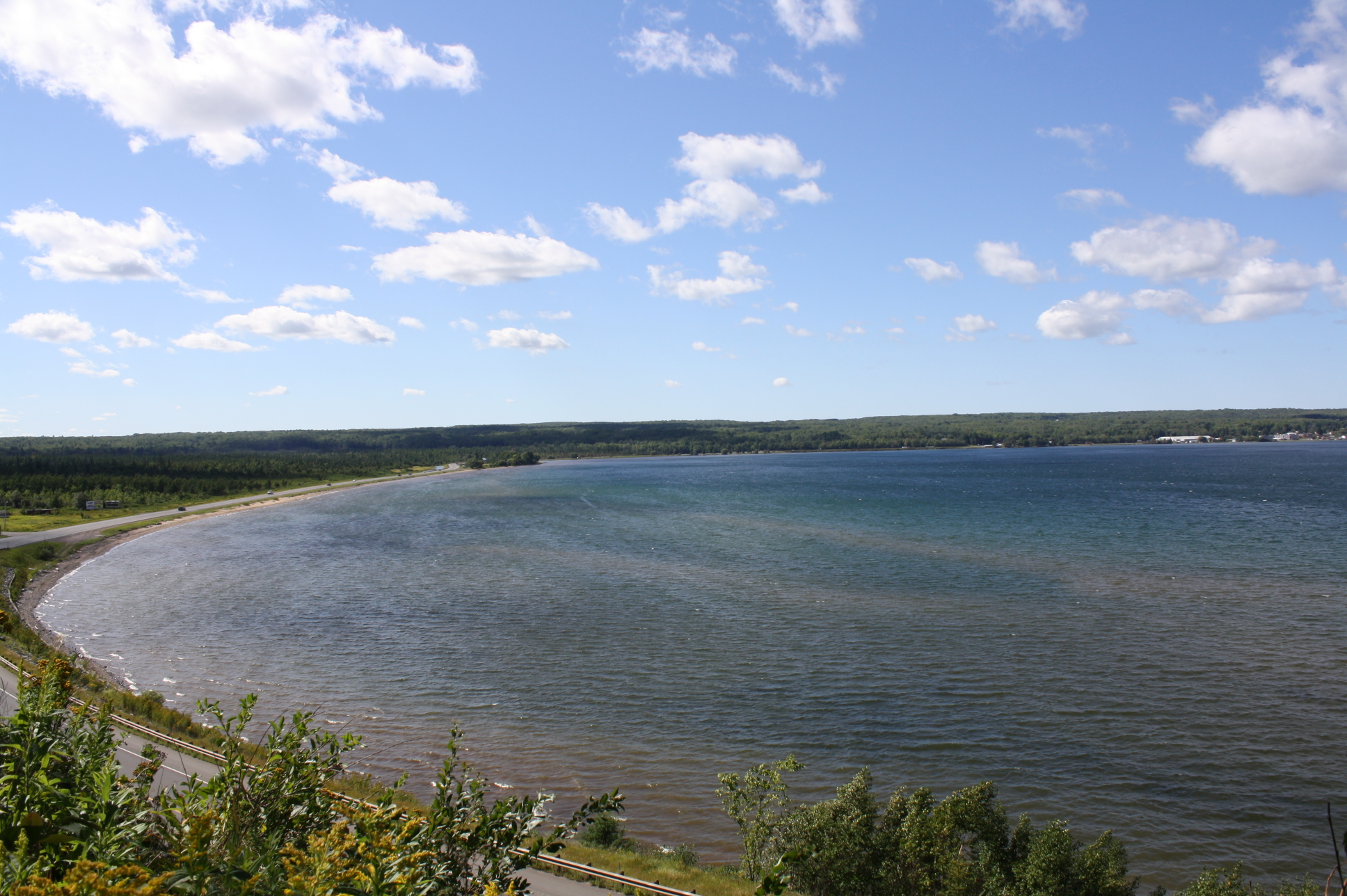
- Base of Keweenaw Bay

- Location within Michigan
- Location: Baraga County, Michigan Houghton County, Michigan
- Coordinates: 46°51′58″N 88°25′18″W
- Type: Bay
- Surface elevation: 604 feet (184 m)

Keweenaw Bay is an arm of Lake Superior in North America. It is located adjacent to the Upper Peninsula of the U.S. state of Michigan, to the southeast of the Keweenaw Peninsula. Keweenaw Bay is 22 miles long and 12 miles wide at the mouth. The head of the bay sits within the reservation of the Keweenaw Bay Indian Community. It is also the name of a small community near the bay.

Communities near Keweenaw Bay include Aura, Assinins, Baraga, Keweenaw Bay, L'Anse, Pequaming, Zeba.

Indian Trails bus lines operates daily intercity service between Hancock, Michigan and Milwaukee, Wisconsin with a stop in the Keweenaw Bay at Carla's Lakeshore Motel.
