= L'Anse, Michigan =

- Village
- Village of L'Anse
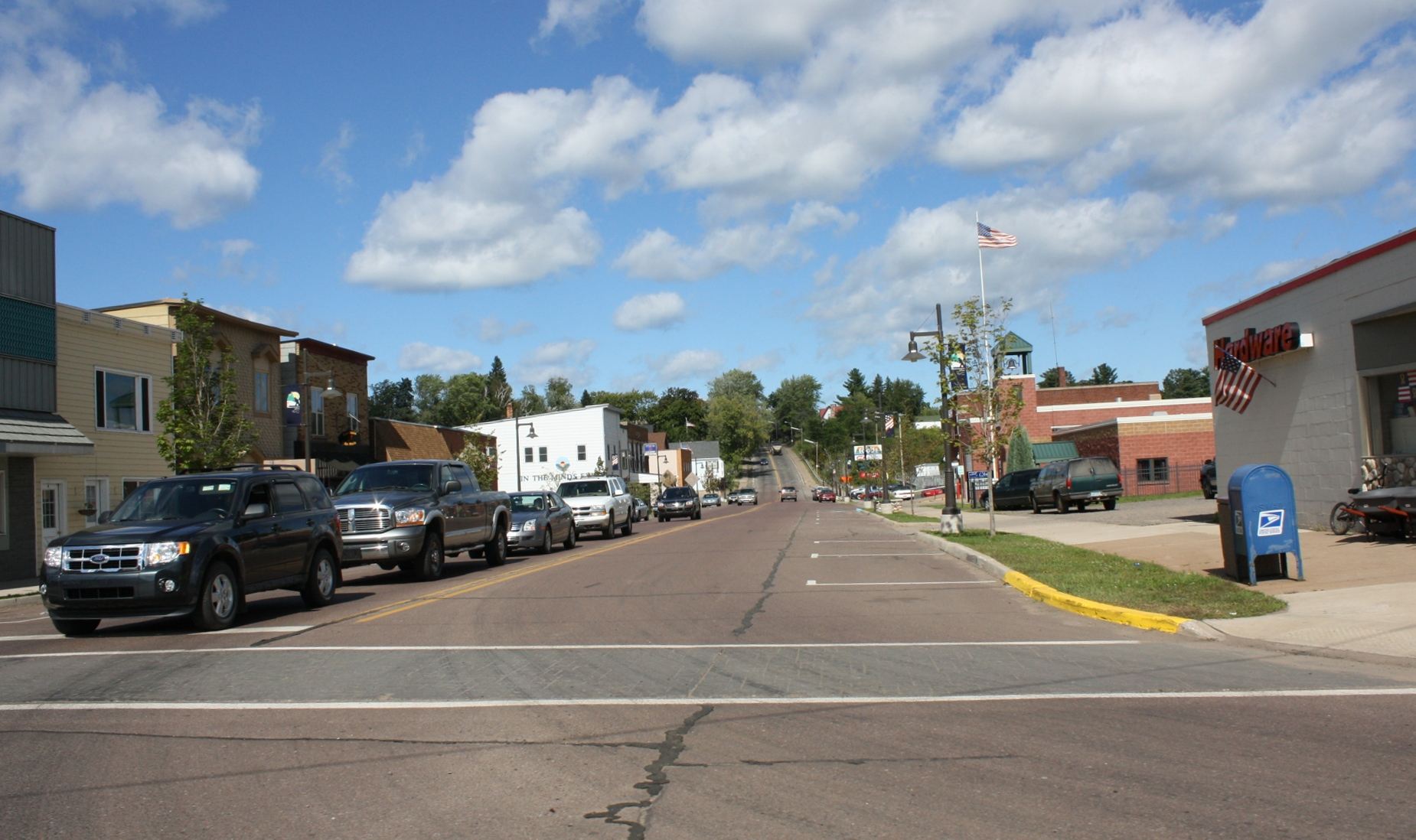
- Downtown L'Anse at River and Main Street

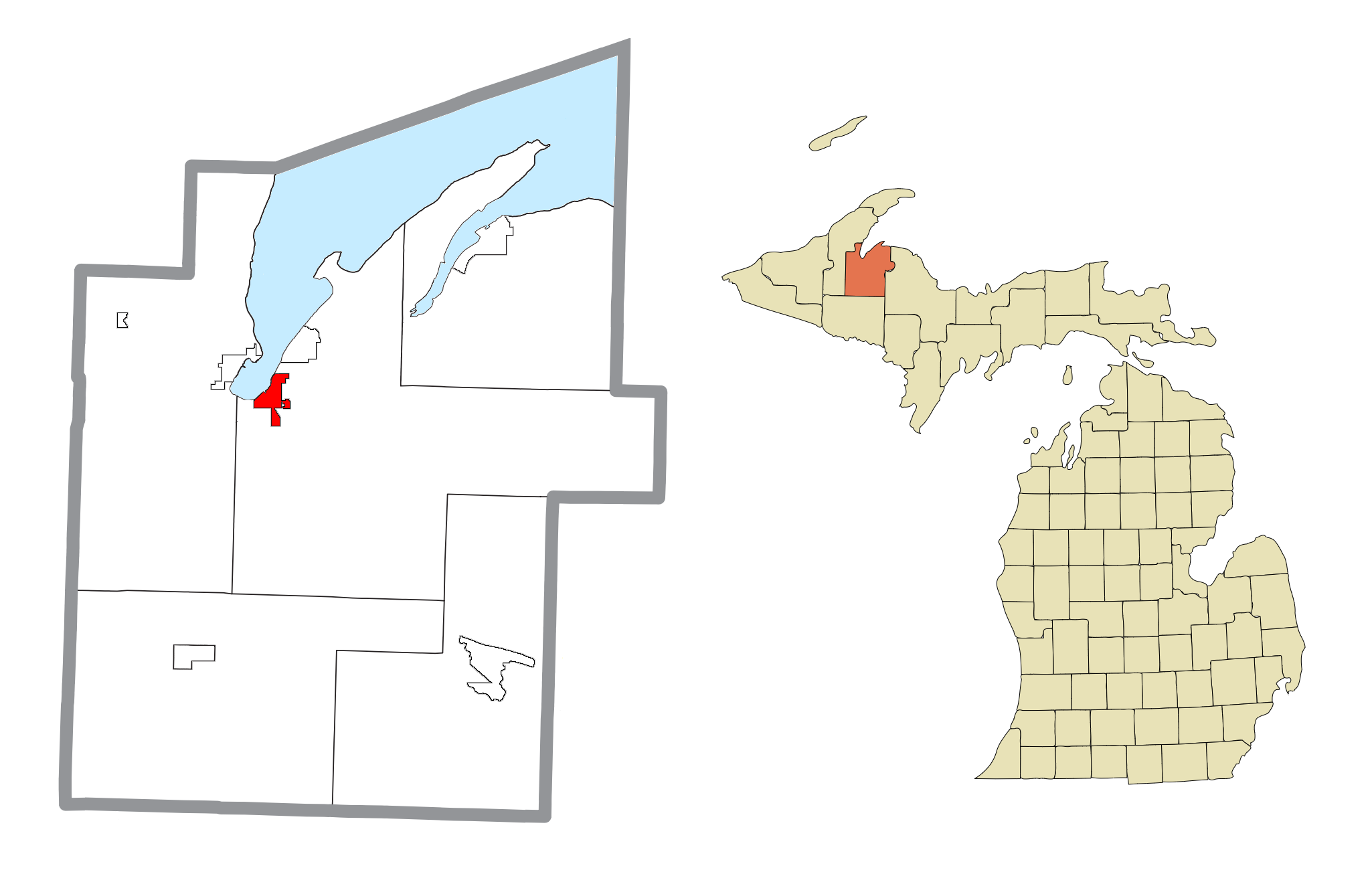
- Location within Baraga County

- Location within the state of Michigan Location within the United States
- Coordinates: 46°45′24″N 88°27′10″W
- Country: United States
- State: Michigan
- County: Baraga
- Township: L'Anse
- Established: 1871
- Incorporated: 1873

Government
  - Type: Village council
  - President: Ronald Ervast
  - Clerk: Amy Leaf

Area
  - Total: 2.55 sq mi (6.60 km^{2})
  - Land: 2.55 sq mi (6.60 km^{2})
  - Water: 0 sq mi (0.00 km^{2})
- Elevation: 620 ft (189 m)

Population (2020)
  - Total: 1,874
  - Density: 724.31/sq mi (279.66/km^{2})
- Time zone: UTC-5 (Eastern (CST))
  - Summer (DST): UTC-4 (EST)
- ZIP code(s): 49946
- Area code: 906
- FIPS code: 26-45540
- GNIS feature ID: 629897
- Website: Official website

L'Anse (/lɑːns/ LAHNSS) is a village in and the county seat of Baraga County, Michigan in the U.S. state of Michigan. The population was 1,874 at the 2020 census. The village is located within L'Anse Township in the Upper Peninsula and partially inside the L'Anse Indian Reservation.

== History ==
French colonists had established a fur trading post here as a part of New France and a Jesuit mission, naming it L'Anse. In French, L'Anse translates as "the cove" or "the bay", a reference to its location in on the southern portion of L'Anse Bay, a portion of the larger Keweenaw Bay, at the base of the Keweenaw Peninsula. The modern-day village grew around this French trading post.

Following treaties with the United States in the 19th century, the Ojibwa/Chippewa ceded extensive amounts of land in Michigan. The L'Anse Indian Reservation was established by the U.S. here as the largest and the oldest in Michigan.

In 1896, the village was completely burned to the ground by a deadly fire which left many homeless.

== Geography ==
According to the United States Census Bureau, the village has a total area of 2.53 square miles (6.55 km^{2}), all of it land.

=== Attractions ===
- The L'Anse Waterfront Park on Baraga Avenue, located in the downtown area, offers a place for visitors to rest and enjoy the surroundings.
- The Falls River Falls in downtown L'Anse is a series of cascading falls spanning the width of the Falls River.
- The Extra, located on Main Street, is a comedy and music venue hosting touring performers.

== Demographics ==
Historical population
| Census | Pop. | Note | %± |
|---|---|---|---|
| 1880 | 1,014 | | — |
| 1890 | 655 | | −35.4% |
| 1900 | 620 | | −5.3% |
| 1910 | 708 | | 14.2% |
| 1920 | 1,013 | | 43.1% |
| 1930 | 2,421 | | 139.0% |
| 1940 | 2,564 | | 5.9% |
| 1950 | 2,376 | | −7.3% |
| 1960 | 2,397 | | 0.9% |
| 1970 | 2,538 | | 5.9% |
| 1980 | 2,500 | | −1.5% |
| 1990 | 2,151 | | −14.0% |
| 2000 | 2,107 | | −2.0% |
| 2010 | 2,011 | | −4.6% |
| 2020 | 1,874 | | −6.8% |
U.S. Decennial Census

=== 2020 census ===
As of the 2020 census, L'Anse had a population of 1,874. The population density was 736.1 inhabitants per square mile (284.2/km^{2}). The median age was 45.1 years. 21.0% of residents were under the age of 18 and 23.5% were 65 years of age or older. For every 100 females, there were 92.4 males, and for every 100 females age 18 and over, there were 94.7 males.

0.0% of residents lived in urban areas, while 100.0% lived in rural areas.

There were 839 households, of which 24.9% had children under the age of 18 living in them. Of all households, 37.9% were married-couple households, 24.3% were households with a male householder and no spouse or partner present, and 30.6% were households with a female householder and no spouse or partner present. About 38.3% of all households were made up of individuals, and 18.3% had someone living alone who was 65 years of age or older.

There were 980 housing units, with an average density of 384.9 per square mile (148.6/km^{2}); 14.4% were vacant. The homeowner vacancy rate was 3.6% and the rental vacancy rate was 9.7%.

Racial composition as of the 2020 census
| Race | Number | Percent |
|---|---|---|
| White | 1,604 | 85.6% |
| Black or African American | 3 | 0.2% |
| American Indian and Alaska Native | 108 | 5.8% |
| Asian | 10 | 0.5% |
| Native Hawaiian and Other Pacific Islander | 2 | 0.1% |
| Some other race | 7 | 0.4% |
| Two or more races | 140 | 7.5% |
| Hispanic or Latino (of any race) | 15 | 0.8% |

=== 2010 census ===
At the 2010 census, there were 2,011 people, 874 households and 502 families living in the village. The population density was 794.9 inhabitants per square mile (306.9/km^{2}). There were 988 housing units at an average density of 390.5 per square mile (150.8/km^{2}). The racial makeup of the village was 88.7% White, 1.4% African American, 5.0% Native American, 0.2% Asian, 0.1% from other races, and 4.6% from two or more races. Hispanic or Latino residents of any race were 0.9% of the population.

There were 874 households, of which 28.1% had children under the age of 18 living with them, 40.0% were married couples living together, 12.2% had a female householder with no husband present, 5.1% had a male householder with no wife present, and 42.6% were non-families. 37.9% of all households were made up of individuals, and 16.4% had someone living alone who was 65 years of age or older. The average household size was 2.16 and the average family size was 2.82.

The median age was 41.7 years. 22.9% of residents were under the age of 18; 6.8% were between the ages of 18 and 24; 24.3% were from 25 to 44; 24.1% were from 45 to 64; and 21.8% were 65 years of age or older. The gender makeup of the village was 47.6% male and 52.4% female.

=== 2000 census ===
At the 2000 census, there were 2,107 people, 894 households and 540 families living in the village. The population density was 821.9 inhabitants per square mile (317.3/km^{2}). There were 981 housing units at an average density of 382.7 per square mile (147.8/km^{2}). The racial makeup of the village was 91.22% White, 0.09% African American, 5.55% Native American, 0.19% Asian, 0.05% Pacific Islander, and 2.90% from two or more races. Hispanic or Latino residents of any race were 0.57% of the population. 27.9% were of Finnish, 11.6% German, 9.4% French, 7.5% Norwegian, 5.9% French Canadian and 5.1% English ancestry according to Census 2000.

There were 894 households, of which 25.6% had children under the age of 18 living with them, 46.4% were married couples living together, 9.8% had a female householder with no husband present, and 39.5% were non-families. 34.2% of all households were made up of individuals, and 16.2% had someone living alone who was 65 years of age or older. The average household size was 2.23 and the average family size was 2.86.

21.3% of the population were under the age of 18, 7.3% from 18 to 24, 25.6% from 25 to 44, 23.9% from 45 to 64, and 21.9% who were 65 years of age or older. The median age was 42 years. For every 100 females, there were 88.8 males. For every 100 females age 18 and over, there were 87.3 males.

The median household income was $31,406 and the median family income was $38,984. Males had a median income of $31,583 and females $20,929. The per capita income was $15,857. About 6.6% of families and 11.0% of the population were below the poverty line, including 14.6% of those under age 18 and 6.1% of those age 65 or over.

== Transportation ==
- US 41 runs through the southernmost portion of the village.
- M-38 begins in the Village of Baraga, across the bay from L'Anse.
- The bus line Indian Trails operates daily intercity bus service between Hancock, Michigan, and Milwaukee, Wisconsin, with a stop in L'Anse.

== Gallery ==
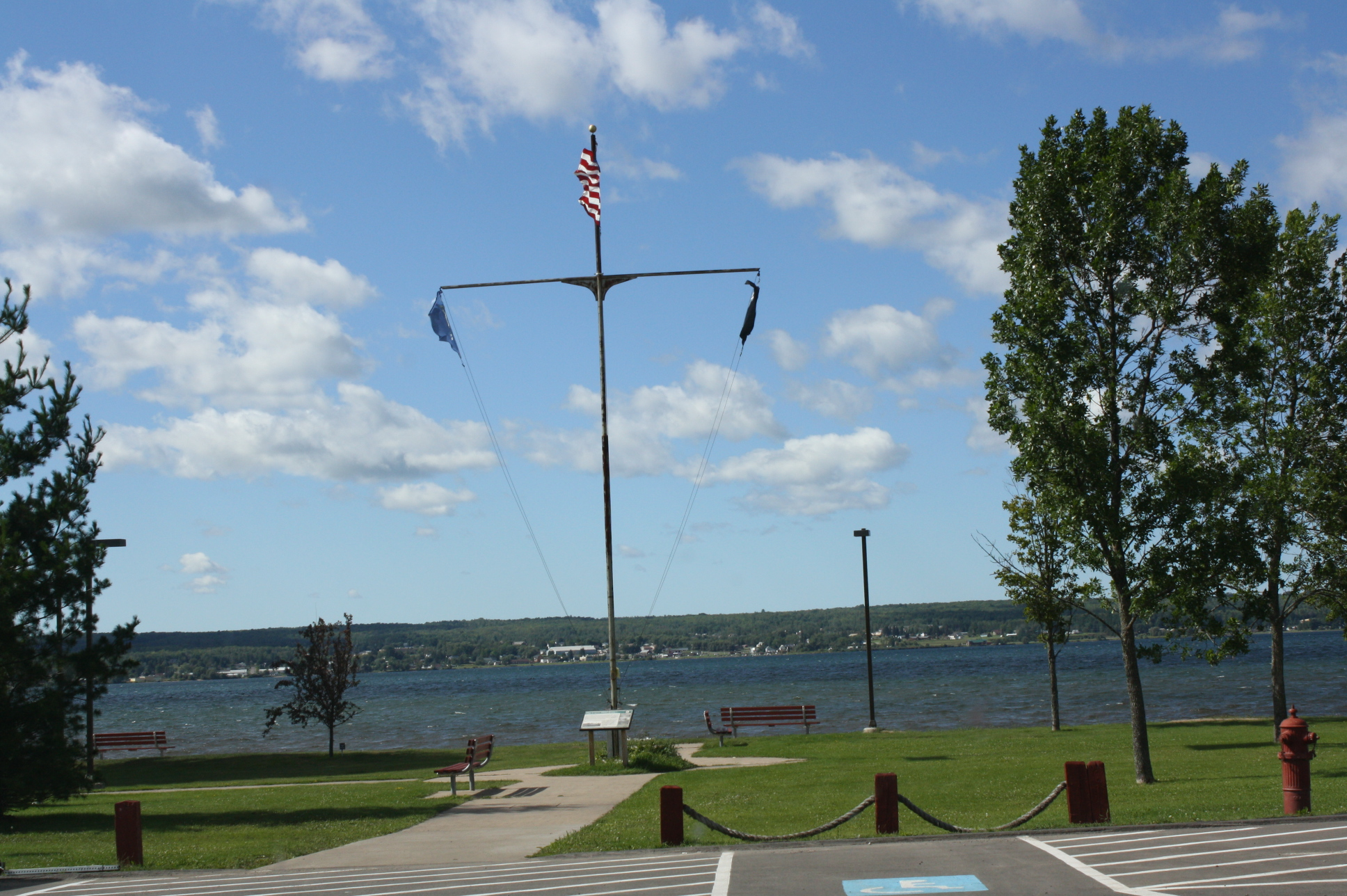
The L'Anse Waterfront Park is in the village on the shore of Lake Superior

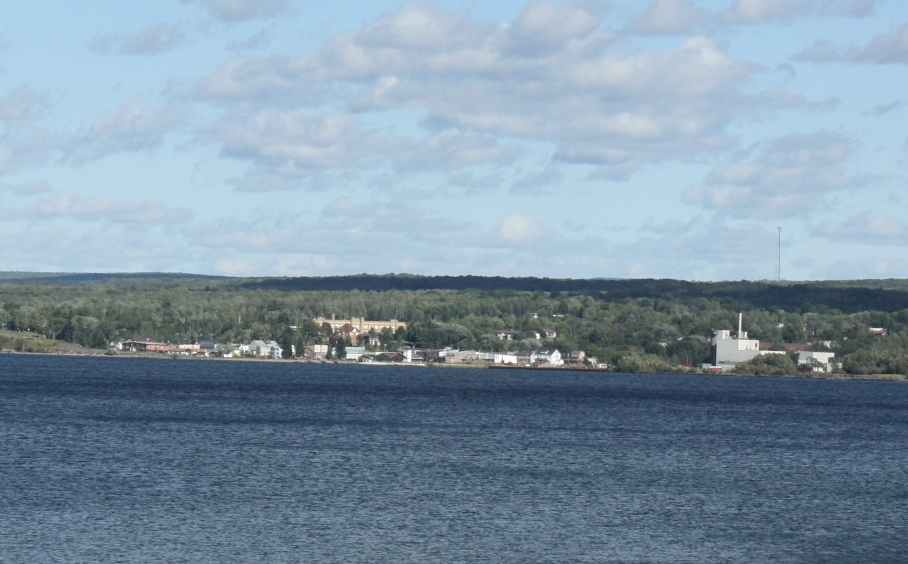
A view across the Keweenaw Bay to L'Anse.

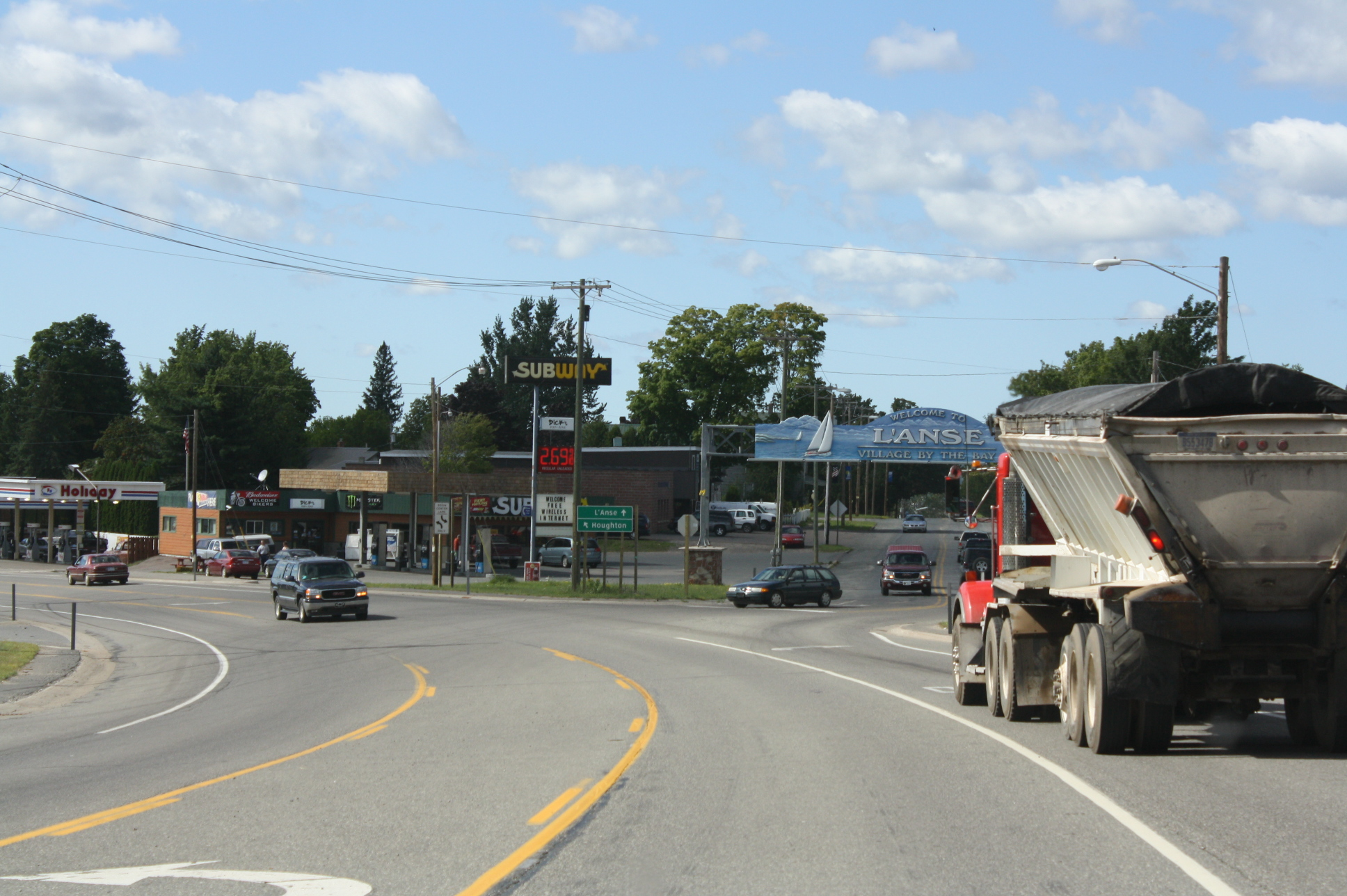
the L'Anse Intersection on US 41

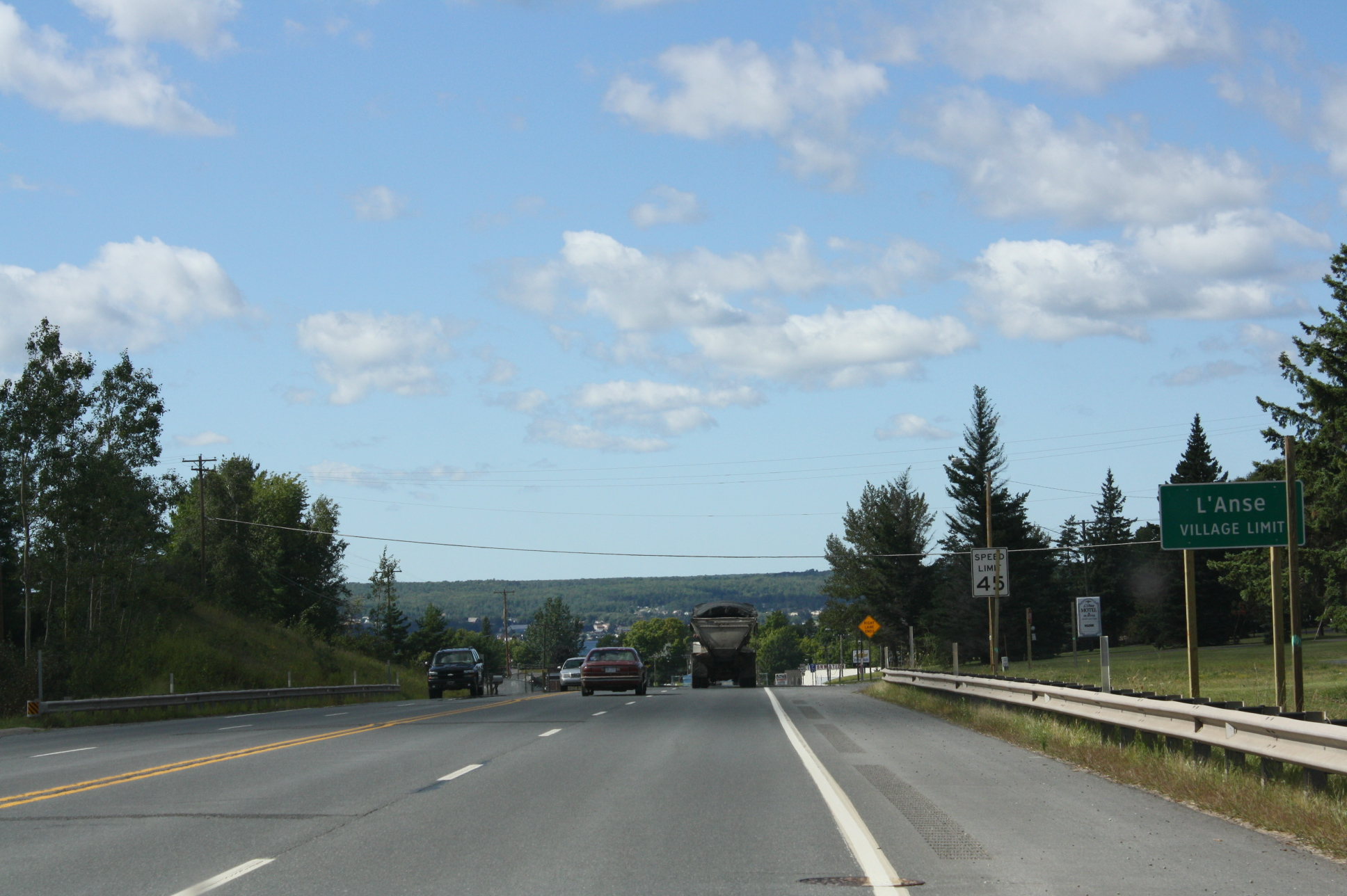
The sign for L'Anse on US 41

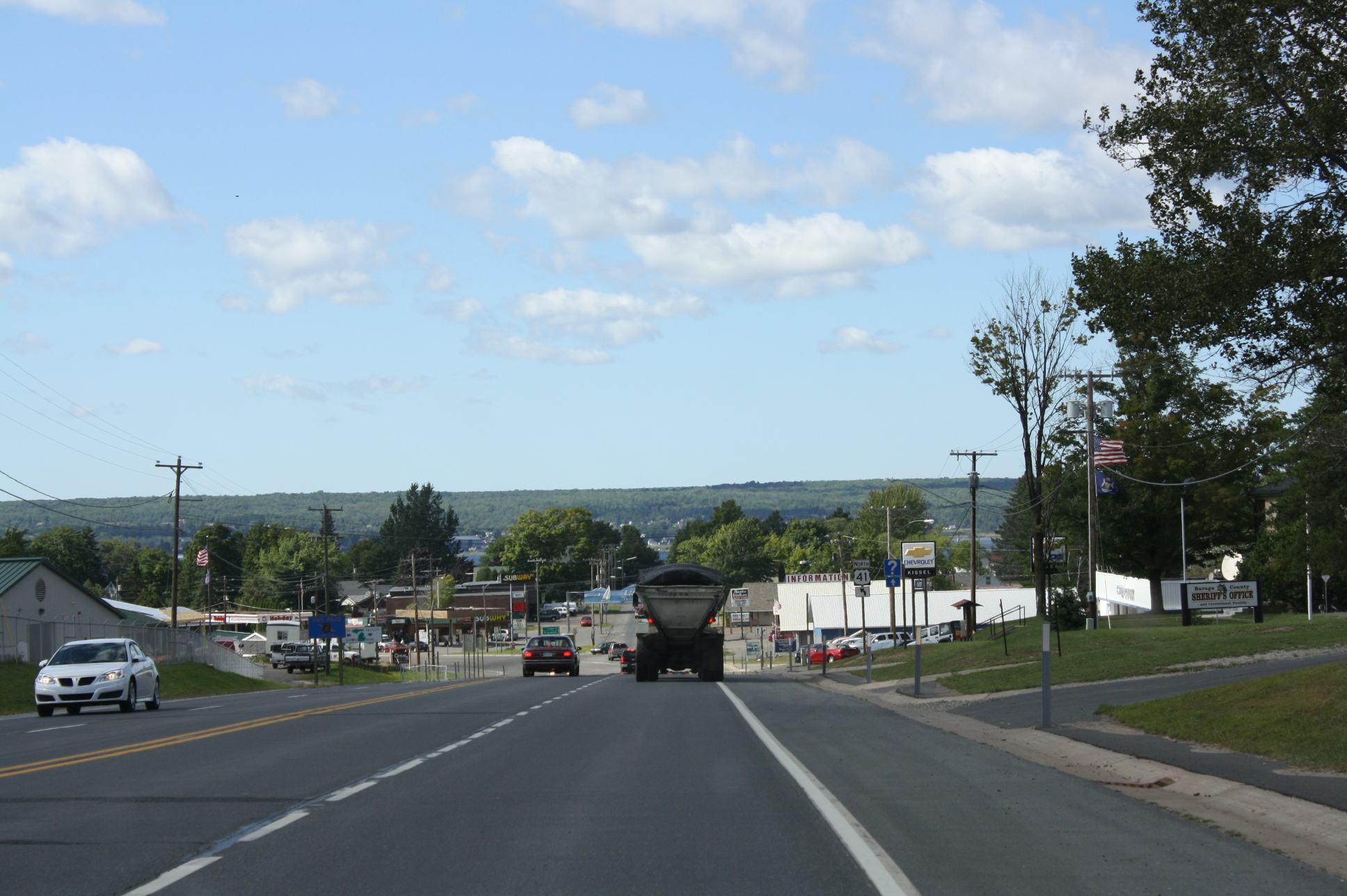
Going through L'Anse

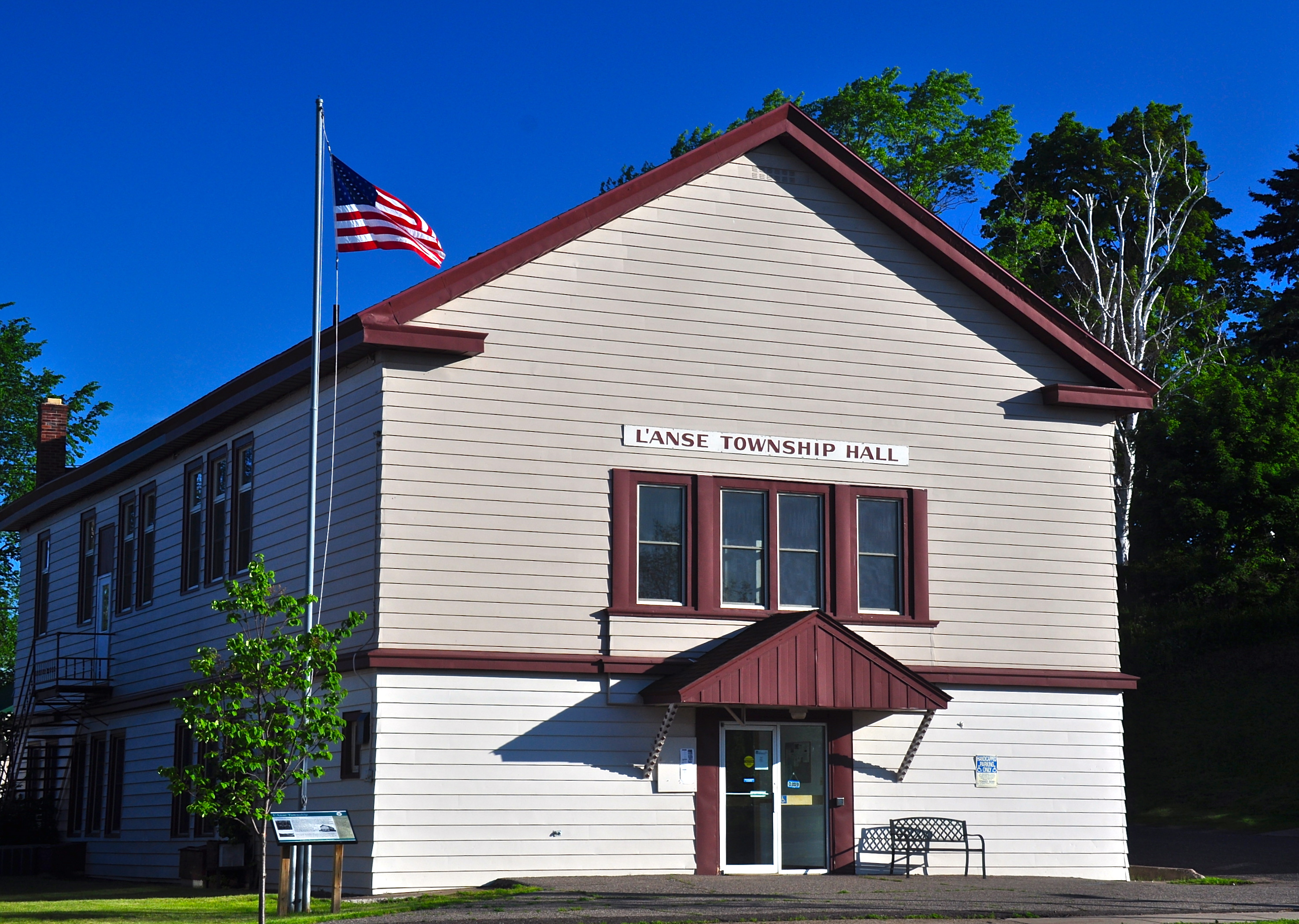
The L'Anse Township Hall

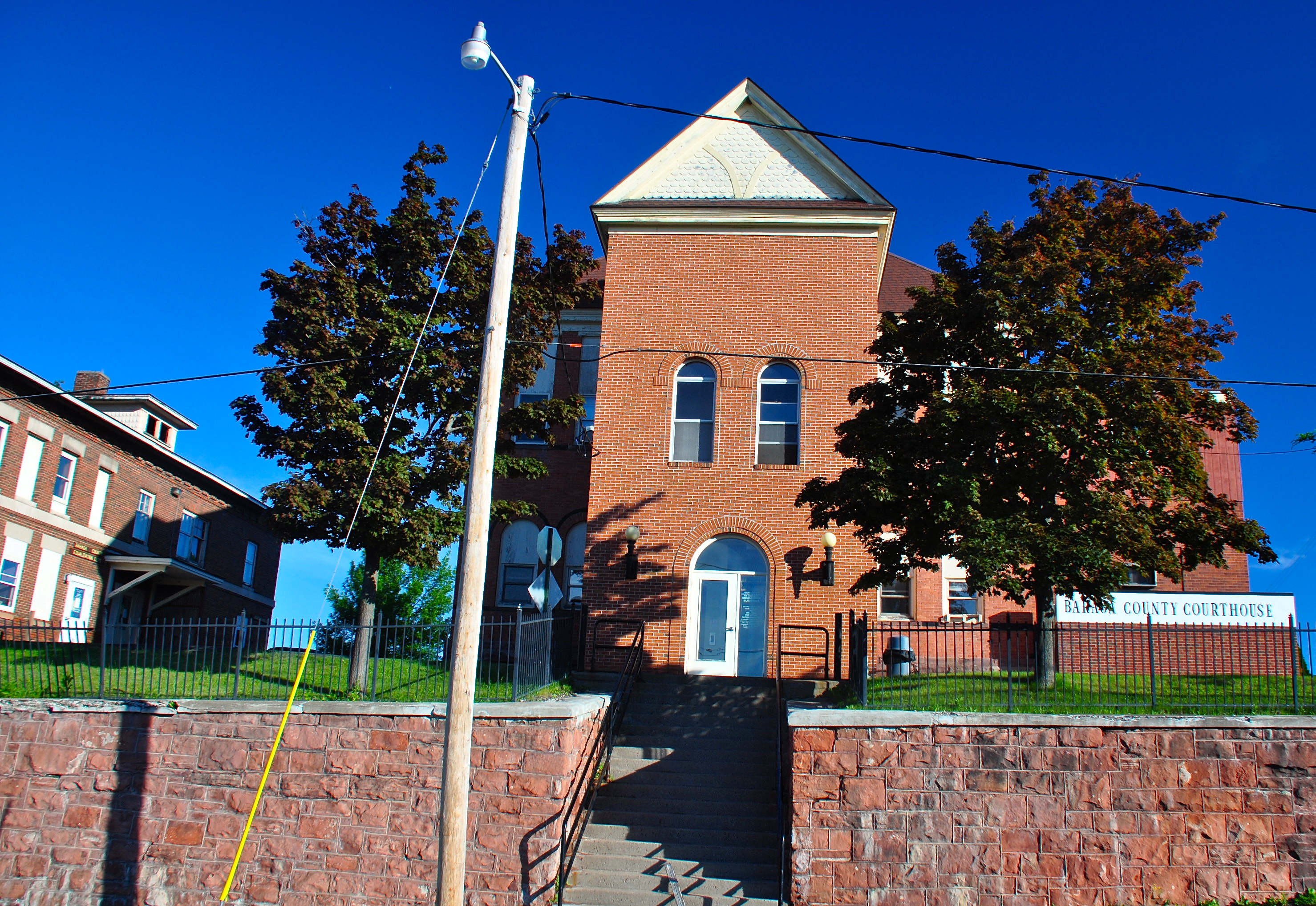
The Baraga County Courthouse and Annex is located in L'Anse.

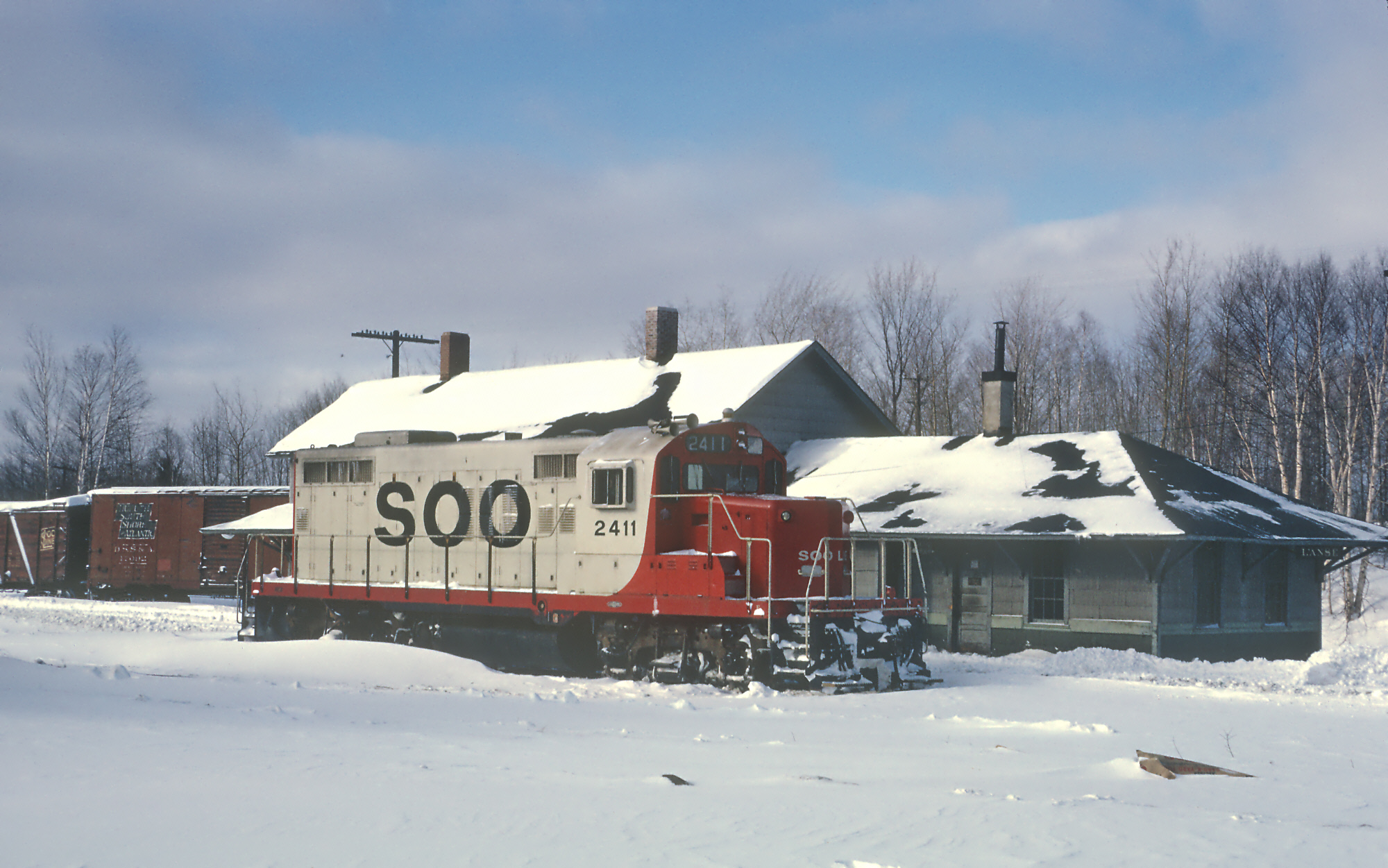
A train of the now-defunct Soo Line Railroad at L'Anse in 1967.
