= Pike River (Michigan) =

Location
- Country: United States

Physical characteristics
- Source
  - location: Portage Township, Houghton County, Michigan
- Mouth
  - location: Portage Lake Chassell Township, Houghton County, Michigan
  - elevation: 604 ft (184 m)

The Pike River is an 11.6-mile-long (18.7 km) stream in Houghton County in the U.S. state of Michigan.

The river begins in Portage Township at 46°56′28″N 88°35′38″W, flows northeast into Chassell Township, and empties into Pike Bay of Portage Lake at 47°01′21″N 88°31′26″W near the community of Chassell.

The Sturgeon River runs to the east, and for its entire course, the Pike River is within 3 miles (5 km) of the Sturgeon River, both converging in Portage Lake. To the west, also within approximately 3 miles (5 km), is the North Branch of the Otter River, which flows to the southwest, opposite of the Pike River. The North Branch Otter River empties into the Otter River, which turns northeast into Otter Lake and then feeds the Sturgeon River.
