= Murphy River =

River in northern Michigan

- Location within Michigan Location within the United States

Location
- Country: United States
- State: Michigan

Physical characteristics
- Source
  - location: Drummond Lake
  - coordinates: 46.4824417°N 88.4537489°W
- Mouth: Worm Lake
  - coordinates: 46.5382739°N 88.5029149°W
  - elevation: 1,588 ft (484 m)

The Murphy River is a 6.6-mile-long (10.6 km) river in Baraga County on the Upper Peninsula of Michigan in the United States. It is a tributary of Worm Lake, the outlet of which is the Rock River, which flows to the Sturgeon River and eventually to Lake Superior.

== See also ==
- List of rivers of Michigan
