= County Road C117–Pike River Bridge =

- U.S. National Register of Historic Places
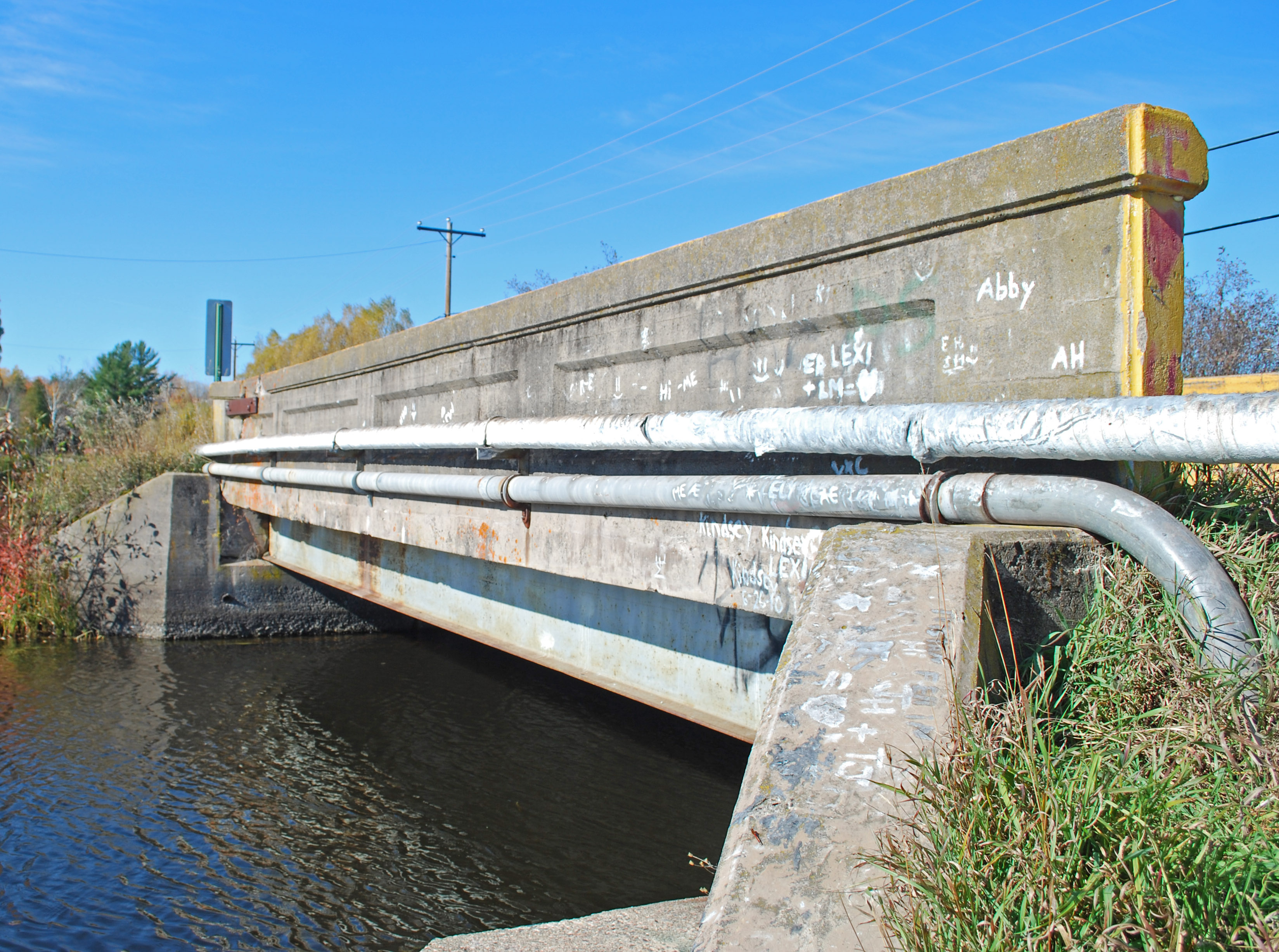
- Side panels of bridge

- Location within Michigan Location within the United States
- Interactive map
- Location: County Road C117 over Pike River, Chassell, Michigan
- Coordinates: 47°1′7″N 88°31′36″W
- Area: less than one acre
- Built: 1914
- Built by: Smith-Byers-Sparks Co.
- Architect: Michigan State Highway Dept.
- Architectural style: Steel stringer bridge
- MPS: Highway Bridges of Michigan MPS
- NRHP reference No.: 99001517
- Added to NRHP: December 09, 1999

The County Road C117–Pike River Bridge is a steel stringer bridge located on County Road C117 (old US 41) over the Pike River just south of Chassell, Michigan. The bridge was placed on the National Register of Historic Places in 1999.

== History ==
In 1913, the state of Michigan passed the State trunkline Act, which authorized the creation of a series of trunkline highways throughout Michigan. One such line was a north–south route through the western counties of Michigan's Upper Peninsula (Keweenaw, Houghton, Ontonagon, and Gogebic counties), tying the northern tip of the Keweenaw Peninsula to the UP's main east–west trunkline. The planned trunkline crossed both the Pike and Snake rivers near Chassell along the eastern side of the Keweenaw. The Michigan State Highway Department designed two 38-foot (12 m) steel stringer bridges, designated trunkline bridges number 8 and 9, to cross the two rivers. The contract to build the two bridges was awarded to the Houghton-based Smith-Byers-Sparks Company in 1913, and the company completed construction of the bridges the next year.

By 1915, the trunkline highway had been nearly completed. In the 1920s, the route was incorporated into what is now US 41. In 1934, the nearby Snake River bride was replaced; US 41 was later rerouted near the Pike River, leaving the original trunkline bridge to service local traffic on the redesignated county road 117.

== Description ==
The County Road C117–Pike River Bridge has a main span 38 feet (12 m) long, with a structure width of 21.4 feet (6.5 m) and a roadway width of 19.1 feet (5.8 m). It is constructed of five rolled I-beams supported by concrete abutments at each end. The bridge was developed from a standard design, first delineated by the state highway department in 1905-1906. The steel stringer design was one of the first established by the department, and was used intermittently during the 1910s for relatively short spans.

Standard paneled concrete guardrails are incorporated on each side of the bridge. One of the guardrails includes the cast words, "State trunkline Bridge 1914" and another, "Built by S-B-S Company Houghton."

The County Road C117–Pike River Bridge is in excellent condition, and is essentially unaltered from when it was built. The bridge was one of the first trunkline bridges built that used the Michigan State Highway Department's steel stringer configuration. Of the 22 total trunkline bridges the department listed in its 1913–14 biennial report, almost half were stringer bridges, and of these Pike River Bridge is the only one to remain undemolished and unaltered. This bridge is thus significant as an early unaltered example of this important bridge structural type used in the Upper Peninsula's trunkline system.

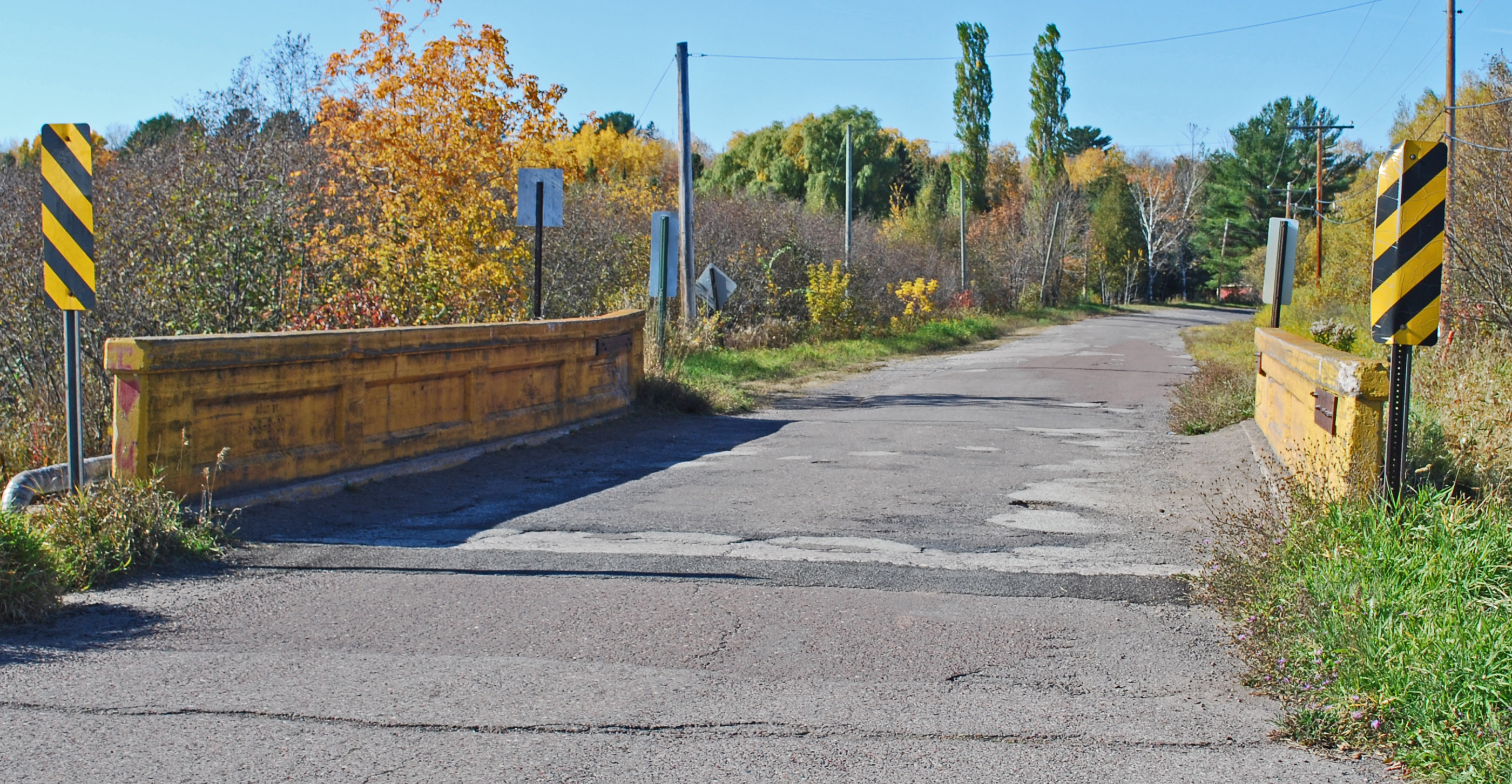
Road surface

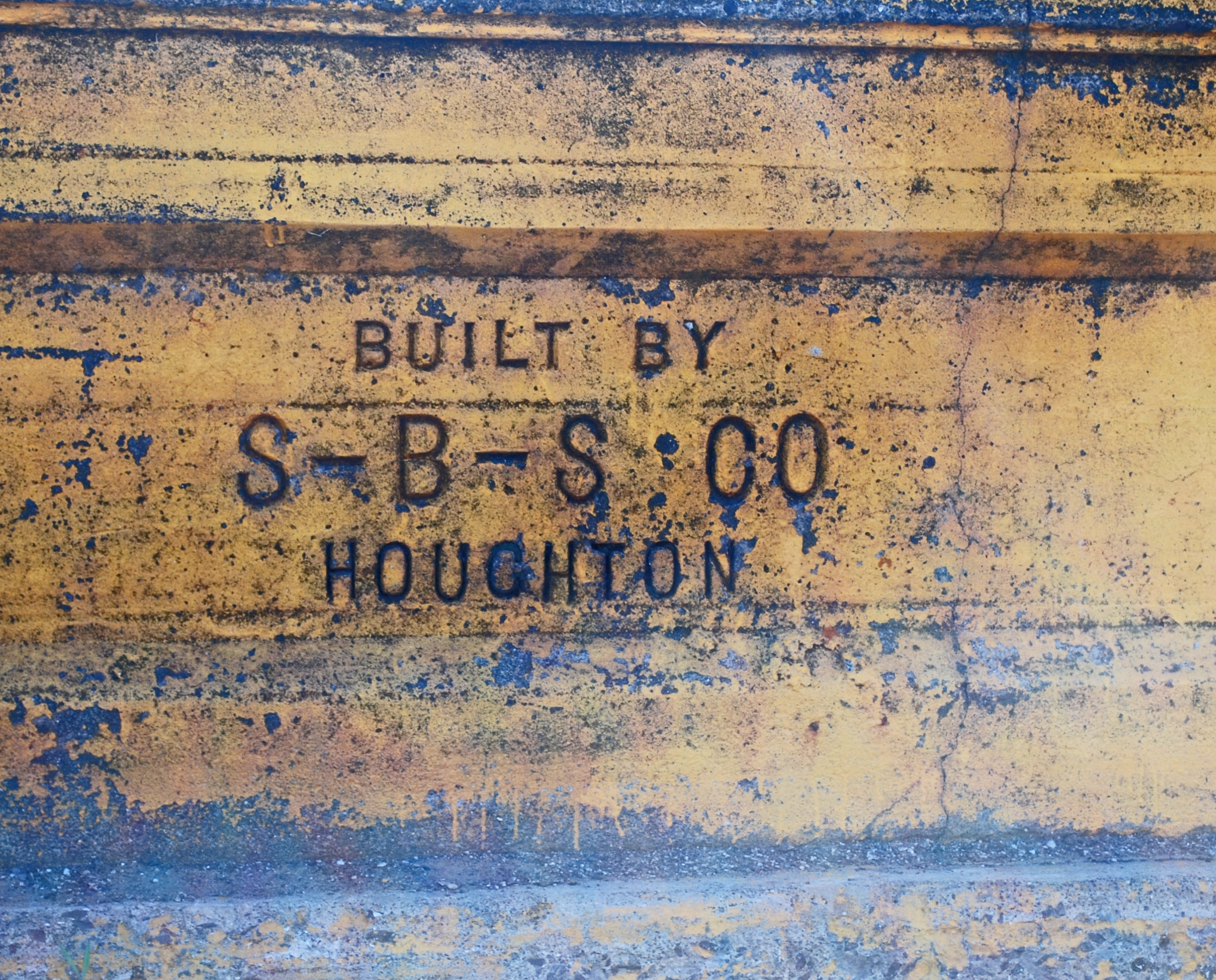
Words cast into guardrails

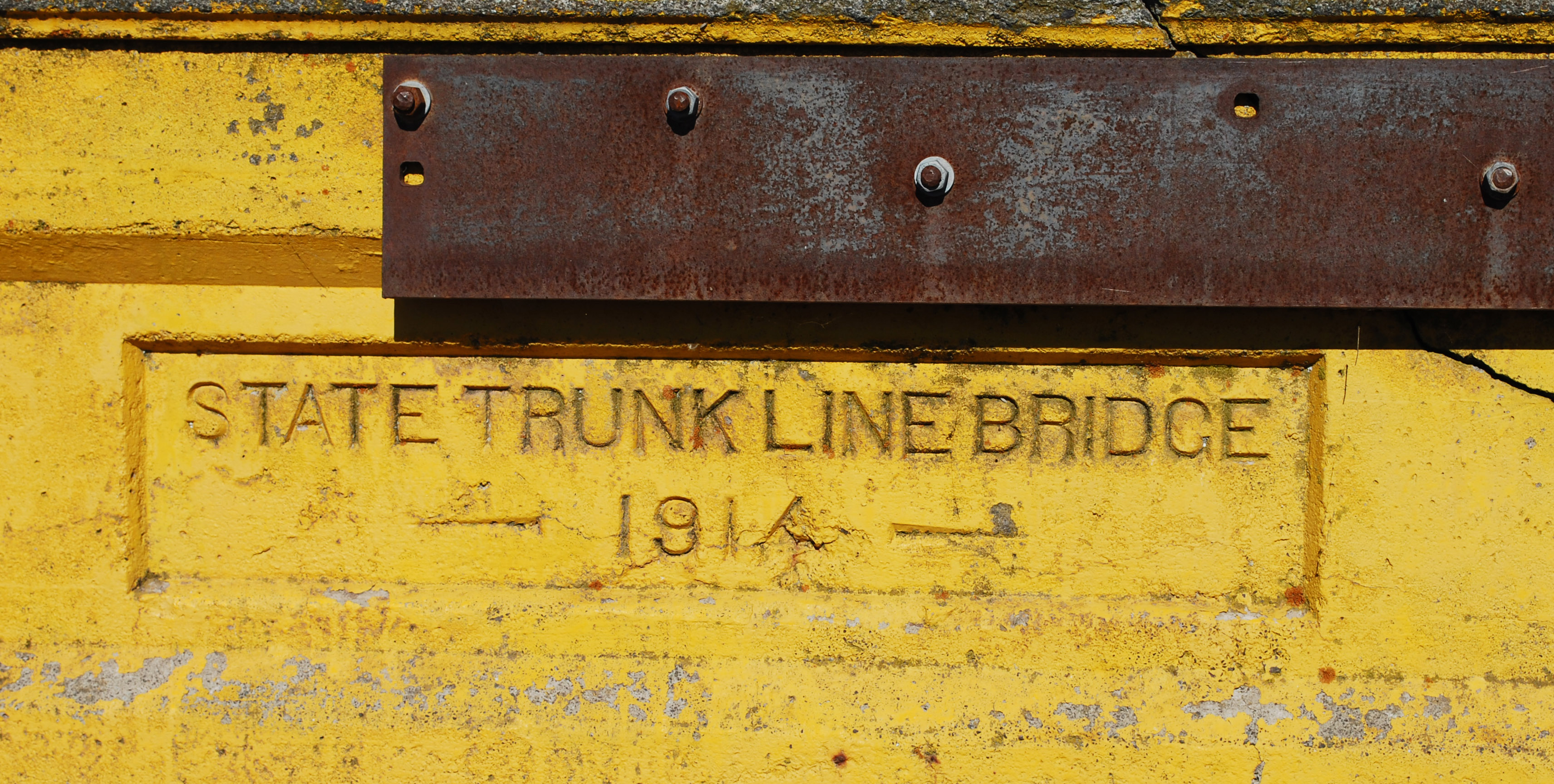
Words cast into guardrails

== See also ==
- List of bridges on the National Register of Historic Places in Michigan
- National Register of Historic Places listings in Houghton County, Michigan
