= Vermilac River =

River in northern Michigan

- Location within Michigan Location within the United States

Location
- Country: United States
- State: Michigan

Physical characteristics
- Source
  - location: Little King Lake
  - coordinates: 46.5158333°N 88.4172222°W
- Mouth: Worm Lake
  - coordinates: 46.5374402°N 88.4773592°W
  - elevation: 1,588 ft (484 m)

The Vermilac River is an 8.8-mile-long (14.2 km) river in Baraga County on the Upper Peninsula of Michigan in the United States. The river flows from Little King Lake through King Lake and then into Worm Lake. The Vermilac River is a tributary of Worm Lake, the outlet of which is the Rock River, which flows to the Sturgeon River and eventually to Lake Superior.

== See also ==
- List of rivers of Michigan
