= Chassell Township, Michigan =

- Civil township
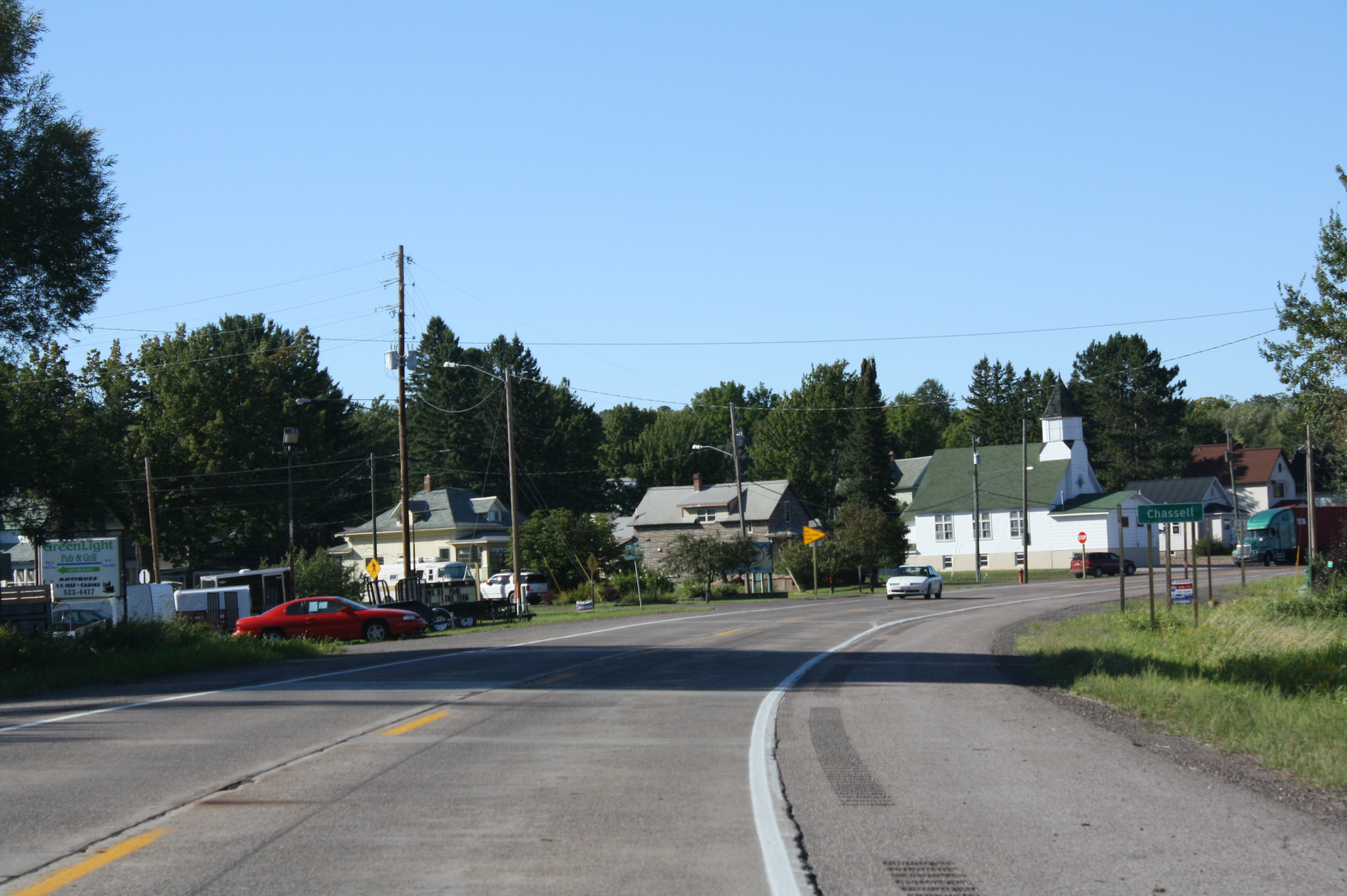
- Community of Chassell along U.S. Route 41

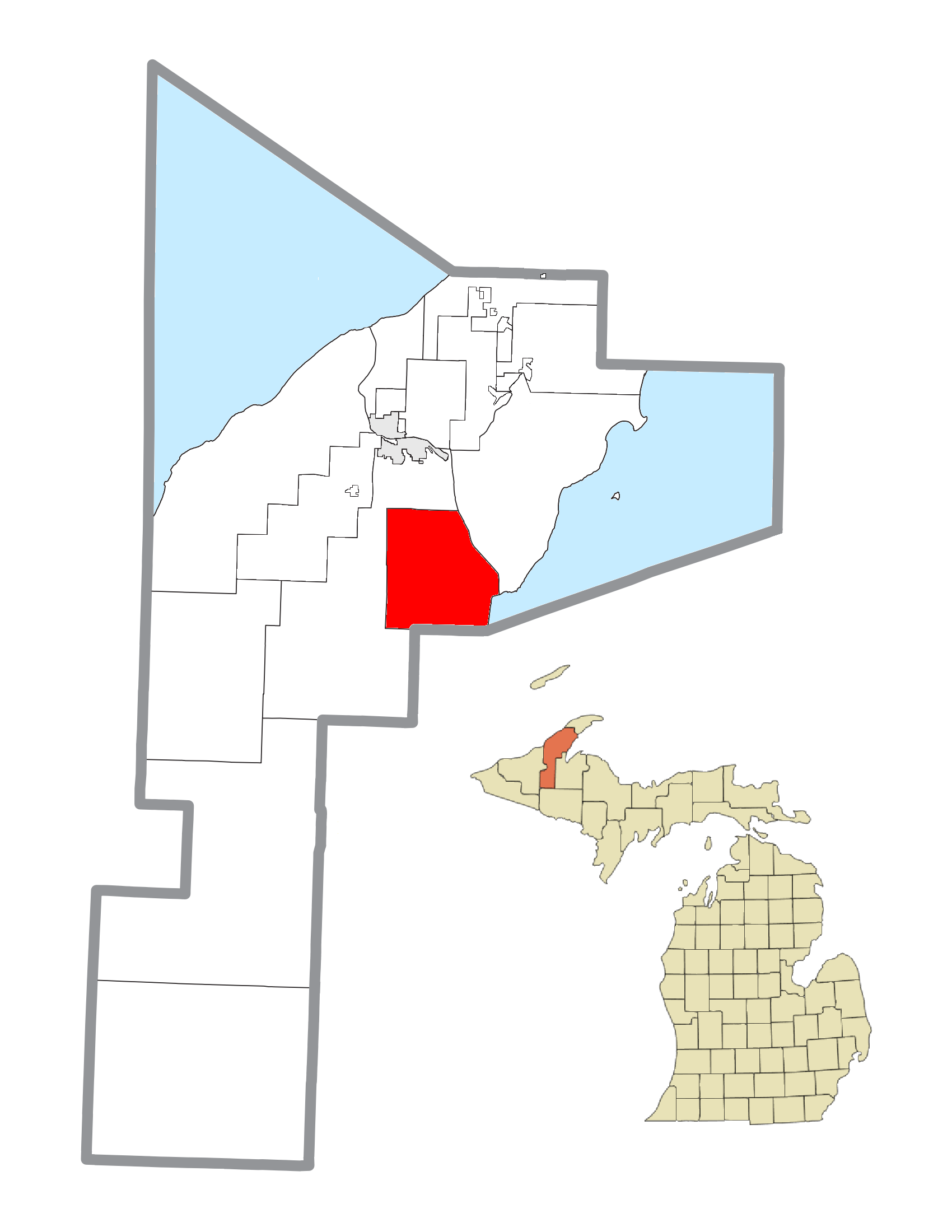
- Location within Houghton County

- Location within the state of Michigan Chassell Township (the United States)
- Coordinates: 47°01′06″N 88°31′26″W
- Country: United States
- State: Michigan
- County: Houghton
- Established: 1888

Government
  - Supervisor: Lynn Gierke

Area
  - Total: 51.9 sq mi (134.5 km^{2})
  - Land: 48.7 sq mi (126.2 km^{2})
  - Water: 3.2 sq mi (8.3 km^{2})
- Elevation: 660 ft (200 m)

Population (2020)
  - Total: 1,878
  - Density: 38.54/sq mi (14.88/km^{2})
- Time zone: UTC-5 (Eastern (EST))
  - Summer (DST): UTC-4 (EDT)
- ZIP code(s): 49916 (Chassell)
- Area code: 906
- FIPS code: 26-14920
- GNIS feature ID: 1626065
- Website: Official website

Chassell Township is a civil township of Houghton County in the U.S. state of Michigan. The population was 1,878 at the 2020 census.

The township was organized on April 14, 1888, and named after John Chassell, a prominent businessman and farmer whose farmland became the site of the community of Chassell.

== Communities ==
- Chassell is an unincorporated community and census-designated place in the township located at the southwest end of Portage Lake on Pike Bay.
- Klingville is an unincorporated community in the township at 46°58′04″N 88°28′40″W.
- Portage Entry is an unincorporated community in the township located at 46°58′56″N 88°26′26″W on the west side of the Portage River, roughly across from Jacobsville in Torch Lake Township. A post office operated from October 10, 1851, until August 8, 1853.
- Singing Sands is an unincorporated community in the township.

== Geography ==
According to the United States Census Bureau, the township has a total area of 51.9 square miles (134 km^{2}), of which 48.7 square miles (126 km^{2}) is land and 3.2 square miles (8.3 km^{2}) (6.14%) is water.

== Demographics ==
Largest ancestries (2000)	Percent
Finnish (Finland)	46.3%
German (Germany)	12.8%
English (England)	7.2%
French (France)	7.0%
Irish (Republic of Ireland)	5.0%
Swedish (Sweden)	4.3%
French Canadian (France) (Canada)	2.5%
American (United States)	2.2%

At the 2000 census, there were 1,822 people, 728 households and 505 families residing in the township. The population density was 37.4 per square mile (14.4/km^{2}). There were 955 housing units at an average density of 19.6 per square mile (7.6/km^{2}). The racial make-up was 97.75% White, 1.48% Native American, 0.11% Asian, 0.05% Pacific Islander, 0.05% from other races, and 0.55% from two or more races. Hispanic or Latino of any race were 0.55% of the population.

There were 728 households, of which 28.0% had children under the age of 18 living with them, 59.5% were married couples living together, 6.2% had a female householder with no husband present, and 30.5% were non-families. 26.8% of all households were made up of individuals, and 13.3% had someone living alone who was 65 years of age or older. The average household size was 2.49 and the average family size was 3.06.

26.0% of the population were under the age of 18, 7.8% from 18 to 24, 23.9% from 25 to 44, 25.5% from 45 to 64, and 16.8% were 65 years of age or older. The median age was 40 years. For every 100 females, there were 104.0 males. For every 100 females age 18 and over, there were 103.0 males.

The median household income was $38,333 and the median family income was $43,088. Males had a median income of $35,188 and females $25,833. The per capita income was $18,133. About 5.6% of families and 6.9% of the population were below the poverty line, including 7.2% of those under age 18 and 8.1% of those age 65 or over.

== Education ==
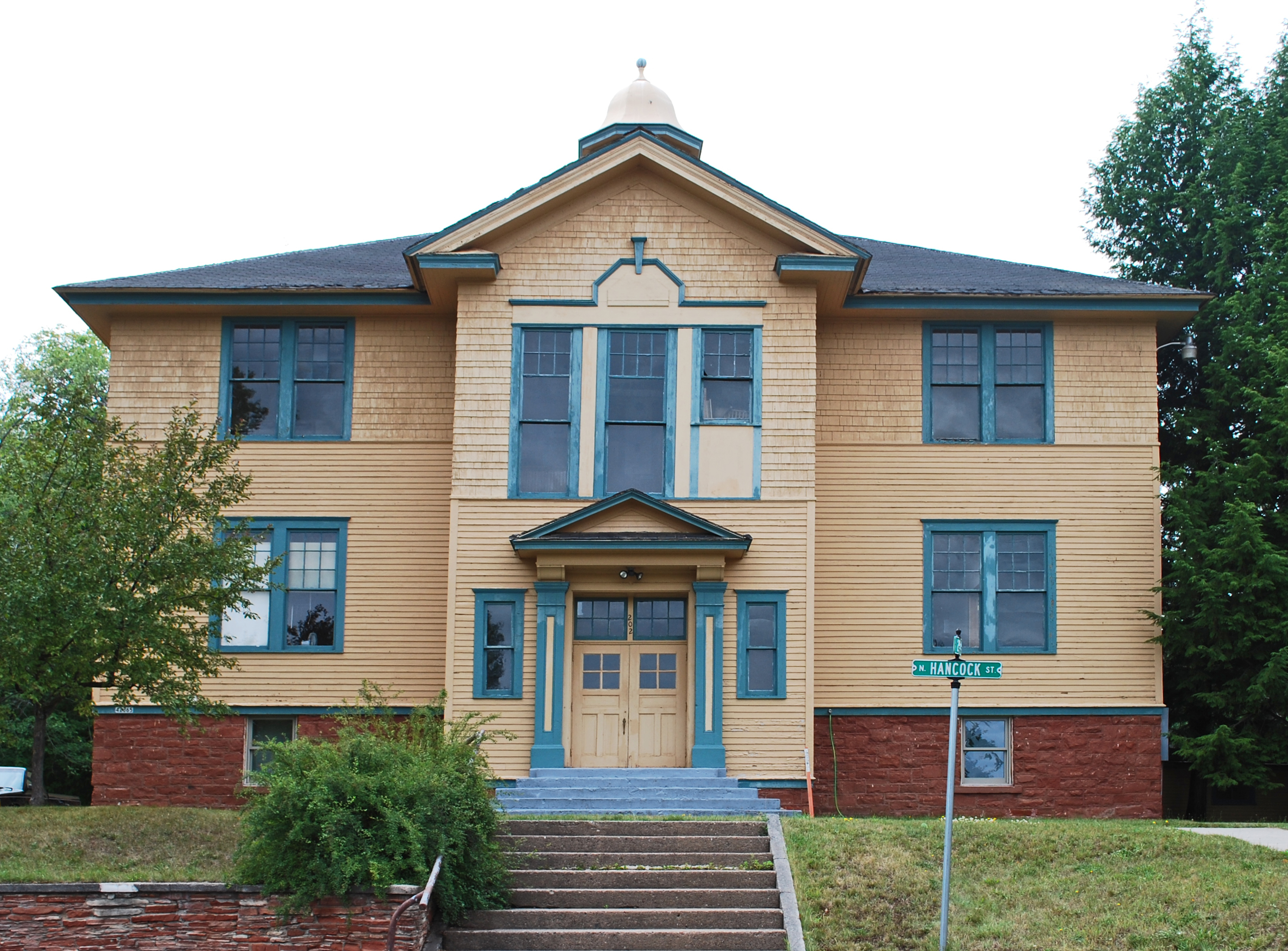
Chassell School Complex 1912 high school building

The high school building was built in 1912 and, together with a 1917 elementary school, has been on the National Register of Historic Places since 2009 as the Chassell School Complex. In 1992, the schools were moved to Chassell Township School, which serves as a K-12 public school.
