= Chassell Township School =

Location
- 41585 US Highway 41; Chassell, Michigan 49916; United States
- 47°1′2″N 88°31′14″W

Information
- School district: Chassell Township Schools
- Superintendent and Principal: Stephen Spahn
- Teaching staff: 13.83 (on an FTE basis)
- Grades: K-12
- Enrollment: 196 (2023-2024)
- Student to teacher ratio: 14.17
- Colors: Blue and gold
- Athletics conference: Copper Mountain Conference
- Nickname: Panthers
- Website: www.chassellschools.com

Chassell Township School is a K-12 school in Chassell, Michigan. It is the only school in the school district.

== History ==
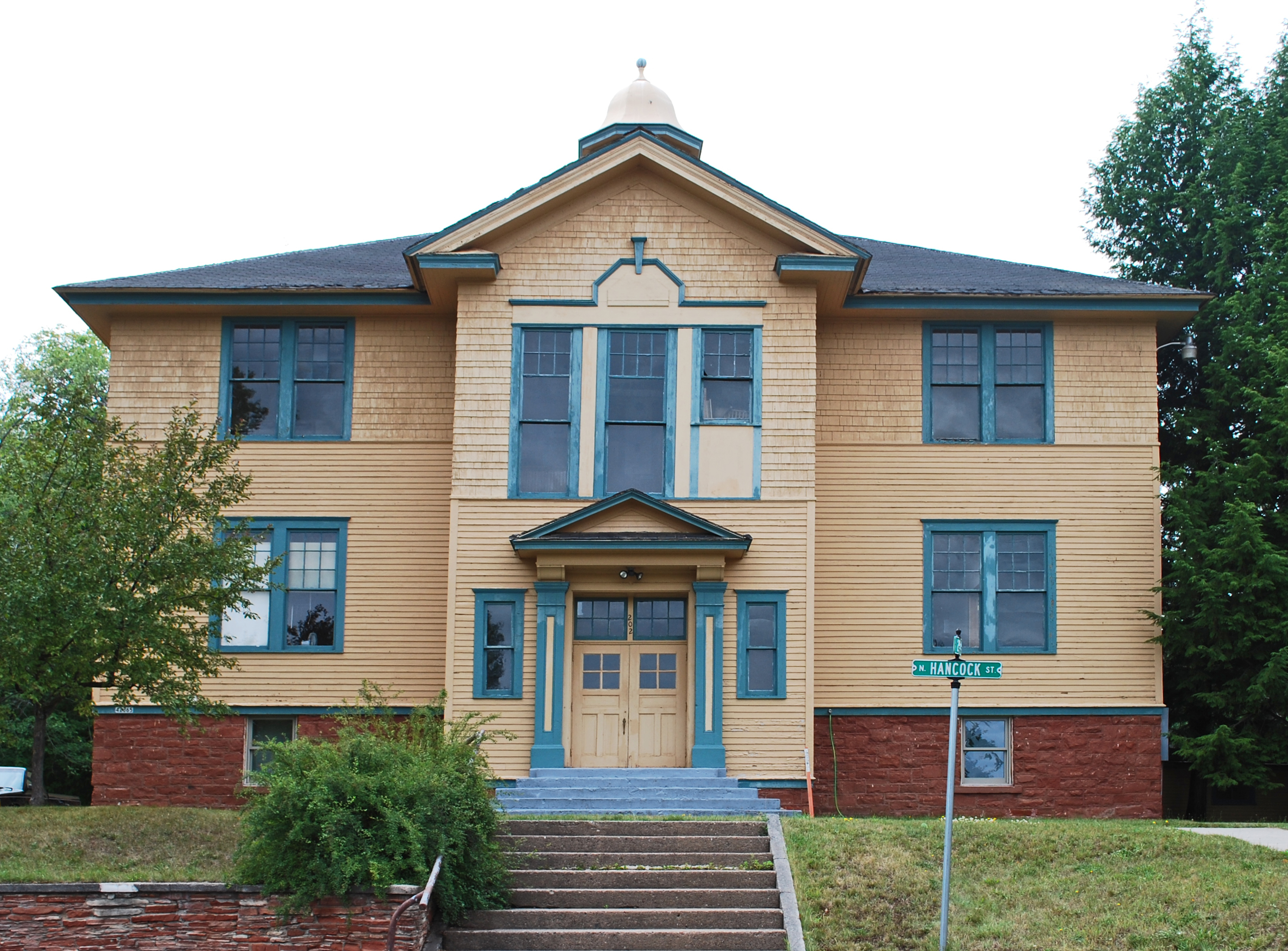
Original 1912 high school building

The current school building opened in 1992. The original high school building was built in 1912 and, together with a 1917 elementary school, has been on the National Register of Historic Places since 2009 as the Chassell School Complex.

== Academics ==
In 2016, Chassell was recognized by U.S. News & World Report as a national bronze medal school.

A trades program was started in 2016, including carpentry, plumbing, and welding, with $16,000 of equipment costs funded by the Chassell Township Public School Foundation. The school also offers career and technical education in subjects including auto mechanics, nursing aide, and early childhood education.

Chassell received a 95.78% graduation index rating and an 83.33% overall index rating in 2016-17 from the Michigan Department of Education Center for Educational Performance and Information.

Graduating class sizes from 2010 to 2015 averaged approximately 19 students (ranging from 11 to 22 students). Approximately 70% of these students went on to at least some post-secondary education.

== Athletics ==
The Chassell Township Panthers compete as a class D school in the Copper Mountain Conference of the Michigan High School Athletic Association. The school colors are blue and gold. The following sports are offered:

- Basketball (boys and girls)
- Cross country (boys and girls)
- Football (boys) (co-op with Hancock)
- Golf (boys and girls)
- Ice hockey (boys)
- Track (boys and girls)
- Volleyball (girls)

The girls' basketball team reached the Class D state final in 2018, losing 36–57 to Lenawee Christian School. Chassell has only approximately 80 high school students and competes against other Class D schools with up to 203 high school students; its 2018 team included 6 of the 7 girls in the school's senior class. This was the first school basketball team to reach the finals since the boys' team won three straight championships from 1956 to 1958.

== Demographics ==
The demographic breakdown of the 238 students enrolled in 2015-16 was:

- Male - 48.1%
- Female - 51.9%
- Asian - 0.4%
- Black - 3.9%
- Hispanic - 0.8%
- Native Hawaiian/Pacific Islander - 0.4%
- White - 94.2%
- Two or more races - 0.4%

47.3% of the students were eligible for free or reduced-cost lunch.
