= Rosa Lemberg =

Namibian-born American-Finnish socialist (1875–1959)

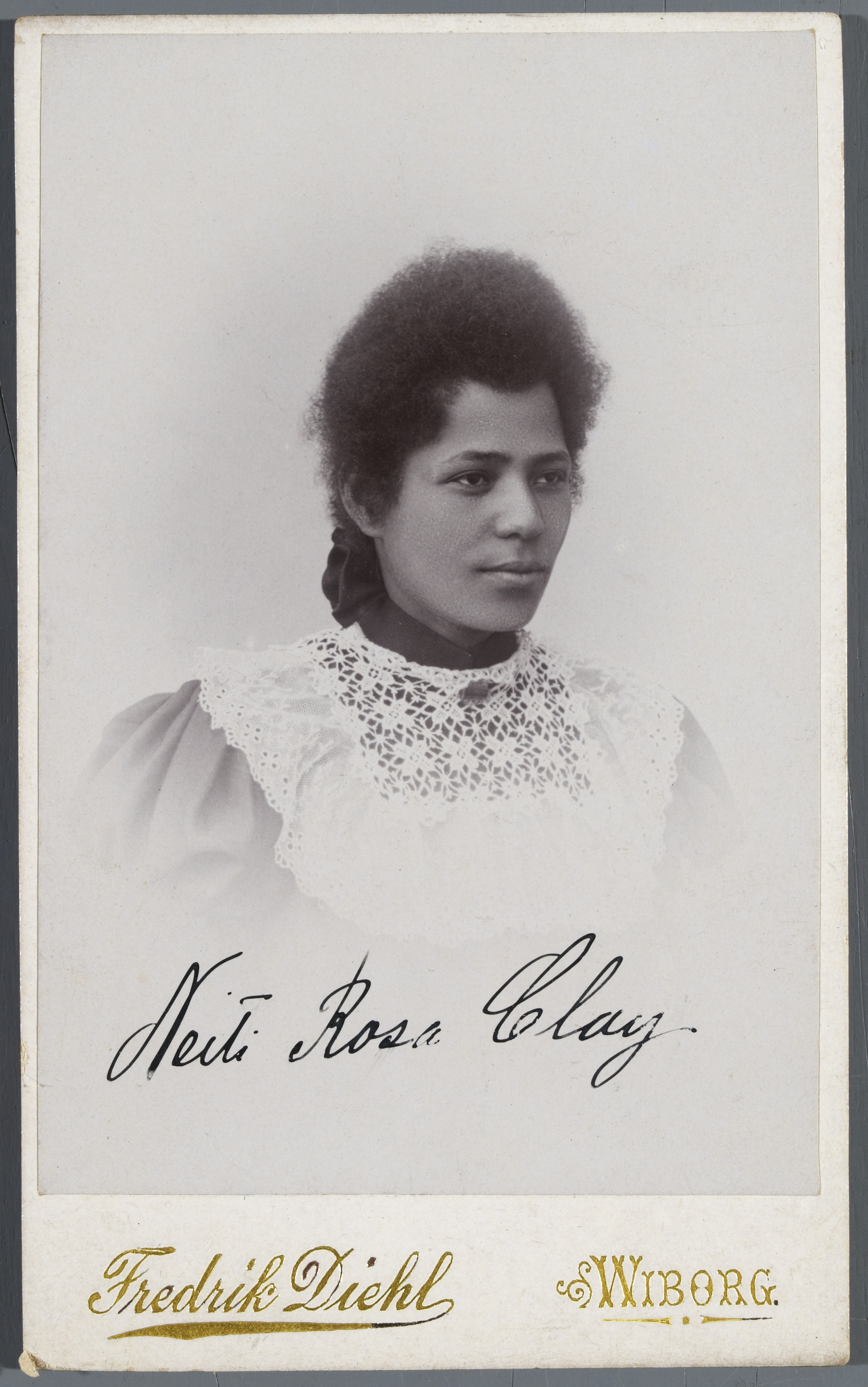
- Rosa Clay in 1899
- Born: Rosa Emilia Clay; 31 August 1875; Omaruru, Namibia
- Died: 1959; Covington, Michigan, United States
- Occupations: Teacher, singer, actress, choral conductor, theatre director
- Spouse: Lauri Lemberg
- Children: 2

Rosa Emilia Lemberg (née Clay; 31 August 1875 – 1959) was a Namibian-born Finnish American teacher, singer and choral conductor. She was the first African-born person in Finland to officially receive Finnish citizenship. She was also a significant influence in the Finnish-American labor movement of the first half of the 20th century.

== Biography ==
=== Early life ===
Lemberg, who was born in the village of Omaruru, located in the territory of present-day Namibia, was the daughter of British merchant Charles William Clay and Feroza Sabina Hazara from the Bantu tribe, from whom Lemberg was taken away soon after birth. When she was four years old, she was adopted by Karl August Weikkolin and Ida Sofia Ingman, who worked as missionaries of the Finnish Missionary Society in Southwest Africa.

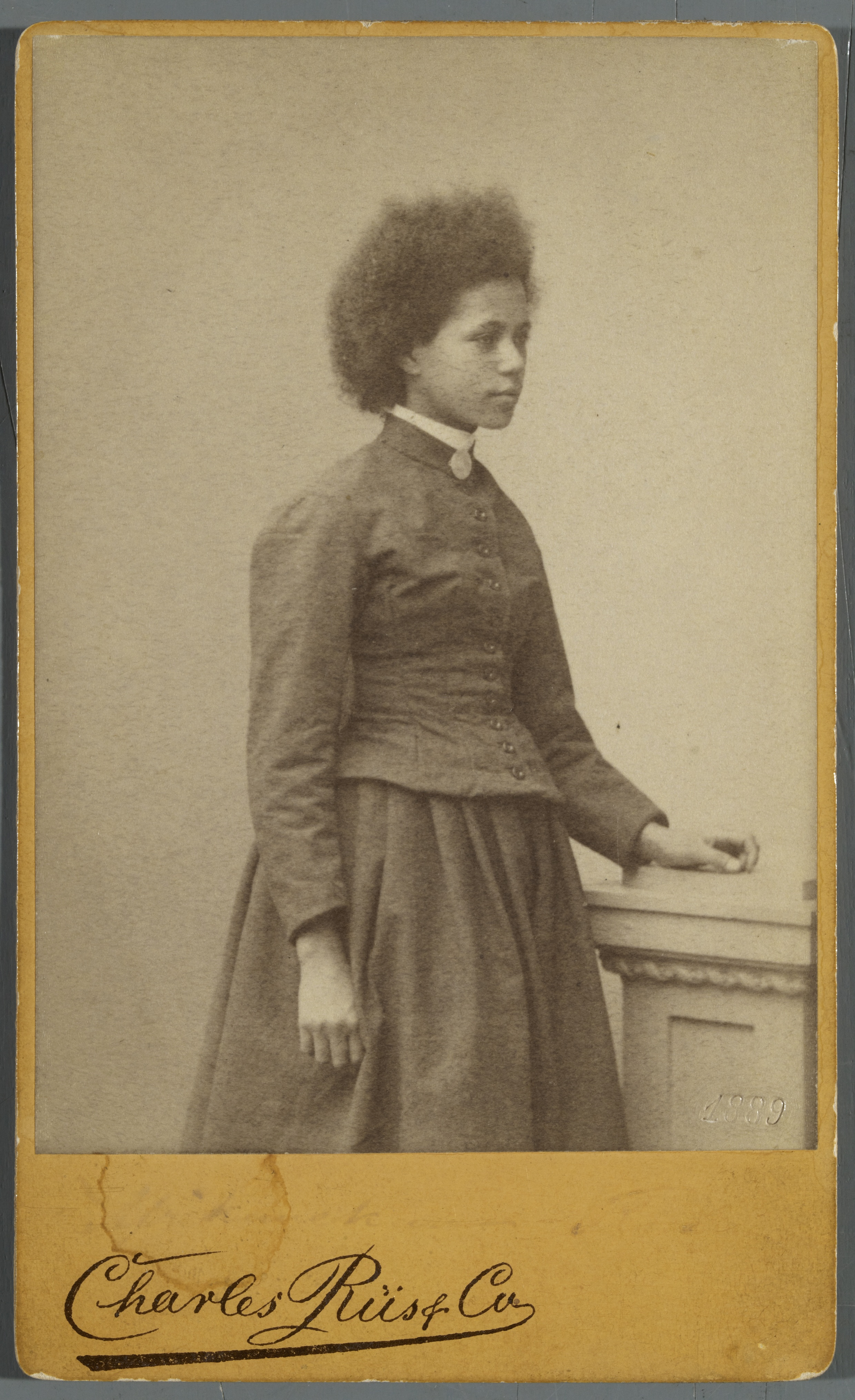
Lemberg in 1889

The Weikkolins returned to Finland for a short time in June 1888, when the family also included son Kalle Johannes, and for a couple of years, the family toured different parts of Finland. They visited spiritual events, where Lemberg, considered exotic, was presented to the public. At that time, Lemberg also performed at Jyväskylä's song festival, where she sold photos of herself to the audience. In the 1890s, she began attending folk school and continued two years of middle school in Helsinki. At the age of 19 she graduated from her seminary in Sortavala, where she was especially successful in art subjects, led the school choir, and often sang solo parts in concerts. She achieved great popularity during a concert tour to Joensuu's song festival in 1897. She graduated as a teacher in 1898 and received Finnish citizenship a year later.

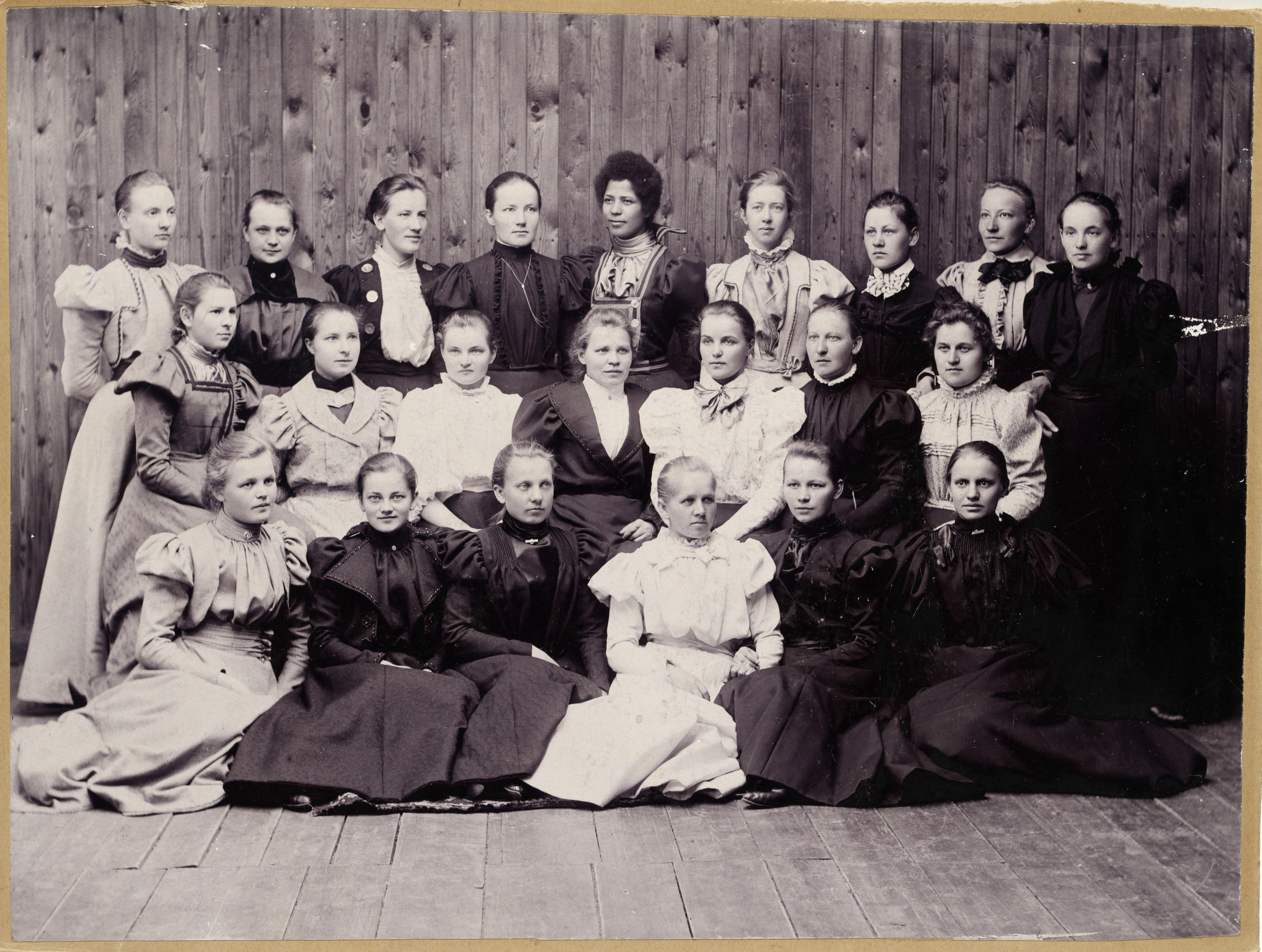
The female choir of the Sortavala Seminary in 1897 on a concert tour in Joensuu. Rosa Lemberg in the middle of the back row.

Lemberg's first job was in the school of Mustinlahti, a village near the city of Kuopio, but life in a small village soon became impossible due to her background; Lemberg rarely left the school due to the prejudices of the villagers. She left her job in 1900 and planned to return to Africa as a missionary. However, she ultimately decided to stay in Finland and worked as a private teacher in Urjala for a year and in Tampere between 1901 and 1903. Life in a bigger city was easier, and Lemberg was also liked by the students. In the summer of 1903, she vacationed in Loviisa, where she met a wealthy Russian doctor. The couple quickly got engaged, but the doctor, who was apparently confused by the drugs he tried, committed suicide just a couple of weeks before the wedding date. Shocked by the incident, Lemberg decided to leave Finland and immigrated to the United States in June 1904.

=== Life in the United States ===
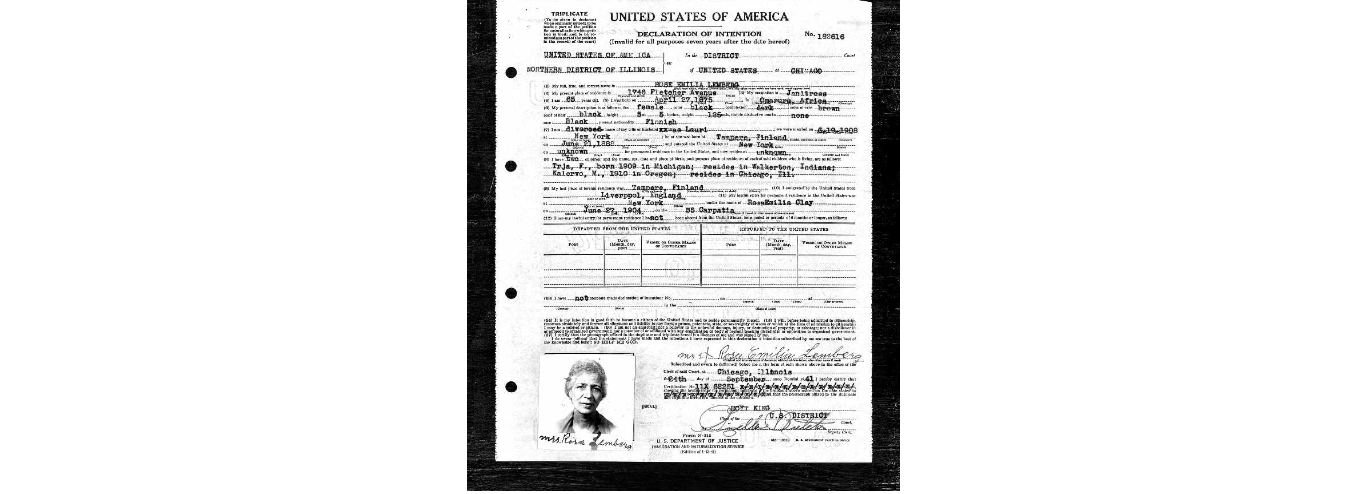
Rosa Lemberg's 1941 naturalization declaration. Her race is listed as "Black", her color as "black", and her nationality as "Finnish".

After arriving in the United States, she joined the company of Finnish immigrants in New York City and soon also joined the local branch of the Finnish Socialist Federation. After a couple of years, she married the Finnish American playwright Lauri Lemberg, and the couple later had two children, Irja and Orvo. The family first moved to Ironwood, Michigan, and in the early 1910s to Astoria, Oregon on the west coast. However, the marriage ended in divorce when Lauri Lemberg moved to California and Rosa remained the sole parent of her children. In Astoria, she became the choir and stage director of the Finnish Socialist Federation.

On the west coast, Lemberg joined the syndicalist Industrial Workers of the World trade union, in which she was later particularly active as a theatre director. In 1916, Lemberg worked as an instructor among Finnish workers in Butte, Montana, and organized, among other things, a program to raise funds for the families of IWW workers killed in the Everett Massacre. In 1919, Lemberg moved to Chicago, where she continued her activities in the IWW union and the local Finnish-American gathering place, Finn Hall. Lemberg performed for free and made a living by working as a seamstress and as a music and language teacher. Although Lemberg's income was very small, she was able to pay for her children's music and dance lessons with it.

Lemberg worked as a choir and theatre director and appeared in leading roles in numerous operettas and musical plays in addition to regular drama. She was especially known as an impressive singer whose vocal range was contralto; because of this, she was called by the nicknames "Nightingale" and "Finnish Sarah Bernhardt". However, Lemberg reportedly did not make any recordings. In addition to singing, she was known as a skilled pianist. In addition to her long-time hometown of Chicago, Lemberg had a great influence in the community and cultural life of Finnish-American socialists in Astoria, Oregon. Due to her influence, the repertoire of the local theater included works by, among others, Henrik Ibsen and Molière, in addition to well-known Finnish plays.

Lemberg was an active cultural influencer in the Finnish-American labour movement even after age 70. She died in the Finnish nursing home in Covington, Michigan at the age of 84 in 1959.

== Legacy ==
At least two biographies have been published about Rosa Lemberg. A Finnish-language work Rosalia by Arvo Lindewall, was published during her lifetime, in 1942, but its truthfulness has been questioned, as its content has been heavily colored. The book, for example, claimed that Lemberg's father was the British vice-governor of Cape Town and her mother was of half-Arab background. In 1993, another biography called The Rosa Lemberg story, written by Eva Helen Erickson, was published by Työmies Society. In 2010, Lemberg's life was discussed in the television documentary series Afro-Suomen historia ("The Afro-Finnish History"), presented by Yle Teema.

In 2020, the fiction novel Rosa Clay, written by literary researcher Vappu Kannas, was published. Kannas combined the historian's sources with her own imagination in the work.
