= Prickett Lake =

Lake in Houghton and Baraga Counties, Michigan, United States

- Location within Michigan Location within the United States
- Location: Laird Township, Houghton County and Baraga Township, Baraga County, Michigan
- Coordinates: 46.7051292°N 88.6835933°W
- Type: Reservoir
- Primary inflows: Sturgeon River, Coach Creek
- Primary outflows: Sturgeon River
- Basin countries: United States
- Surface area: 810 acres (330 ha)
- Max. depth: 56 feet (17 m)
- Surface elevation: 755 feet (230 m)
- Islands: 7

Prickett Lake is a 810 acres (330 ha) lake in Houghton County and Baraga County, Michigan. The lake is also known as Prickett Dam Backwater and is surrounded by dense forest. The lake is a reservoir and was created in 1931 by damming the Sturgeon River. The bottom is mainly sand and it has a maximum depth of 56 feet (17 m).

== See also ==
- List of lakes in Michigan
