= Worm Lake (Michigan) =

Lake in Baraga County, Michigan, United States

- Vermilac Lake
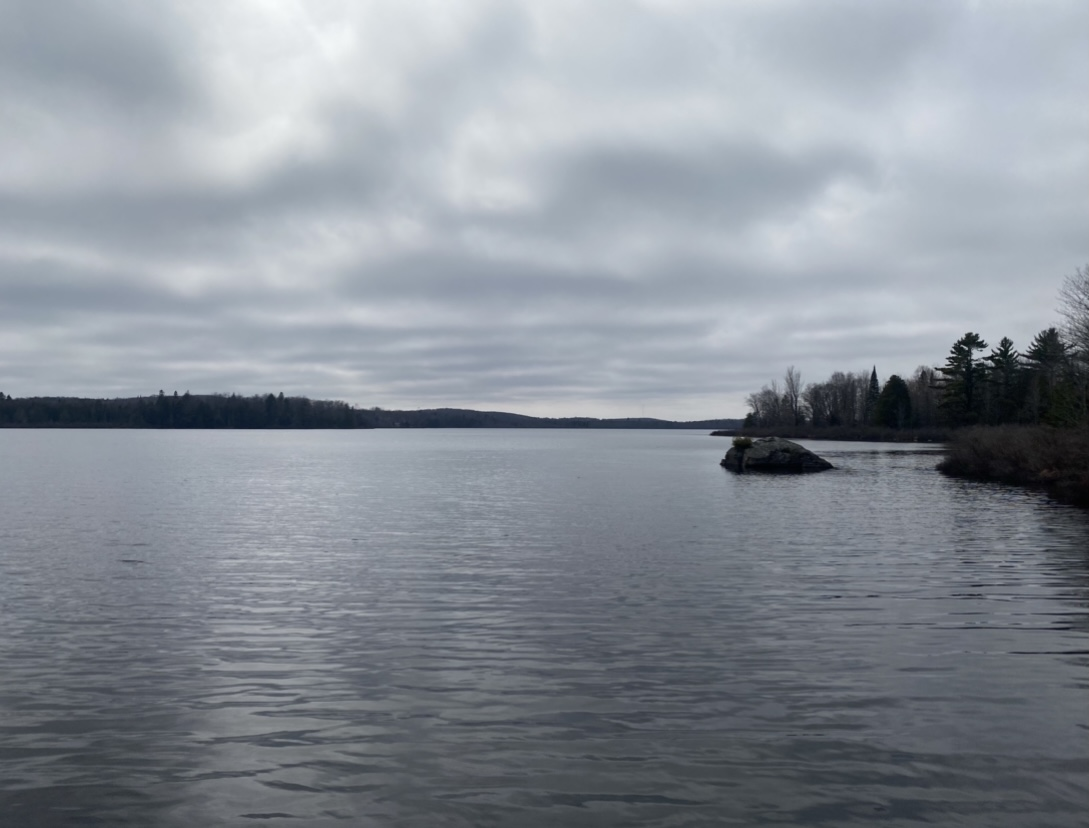
- Worm Lake facing south.

- Location within Michigan Location within the United States
- Location: Covington Township, Baraga County, Michigan
- Coordinates: 46.5413098°N 88.4946760°W
- Primary inflows: Murphy River, Vermilac River
- Primary outflows: Rock River
- Basin countries: United States
- Surface area: 622 acres (252 ha)
- Max. depth: 7 feet (2.1 m)
- Surface elevation: 1,588 feet (484 m)

Worm Lake also known as Vermilac Lake is a 622-acre (252 ha) lake in Baraga County, Michigan. Both the Murphy River and the Vermilac River are inflows along the southern side of the lake. The Rock River is an out flow along the northeast side of the lake. Worm Lake is surrounded by dense forest and is largely undeveloped. The average depth is 3 feet (0.91 m) and the maximum depth is 7 feet (2.1 m). There is one public boat launch on the north side of the lake.

== See also ==
- List of lakes in Michigan
