= Sturgeon River Gorge Wilderness =

Wilderness area in Michigan, United States

- IUCN category Ib (wilderness area)
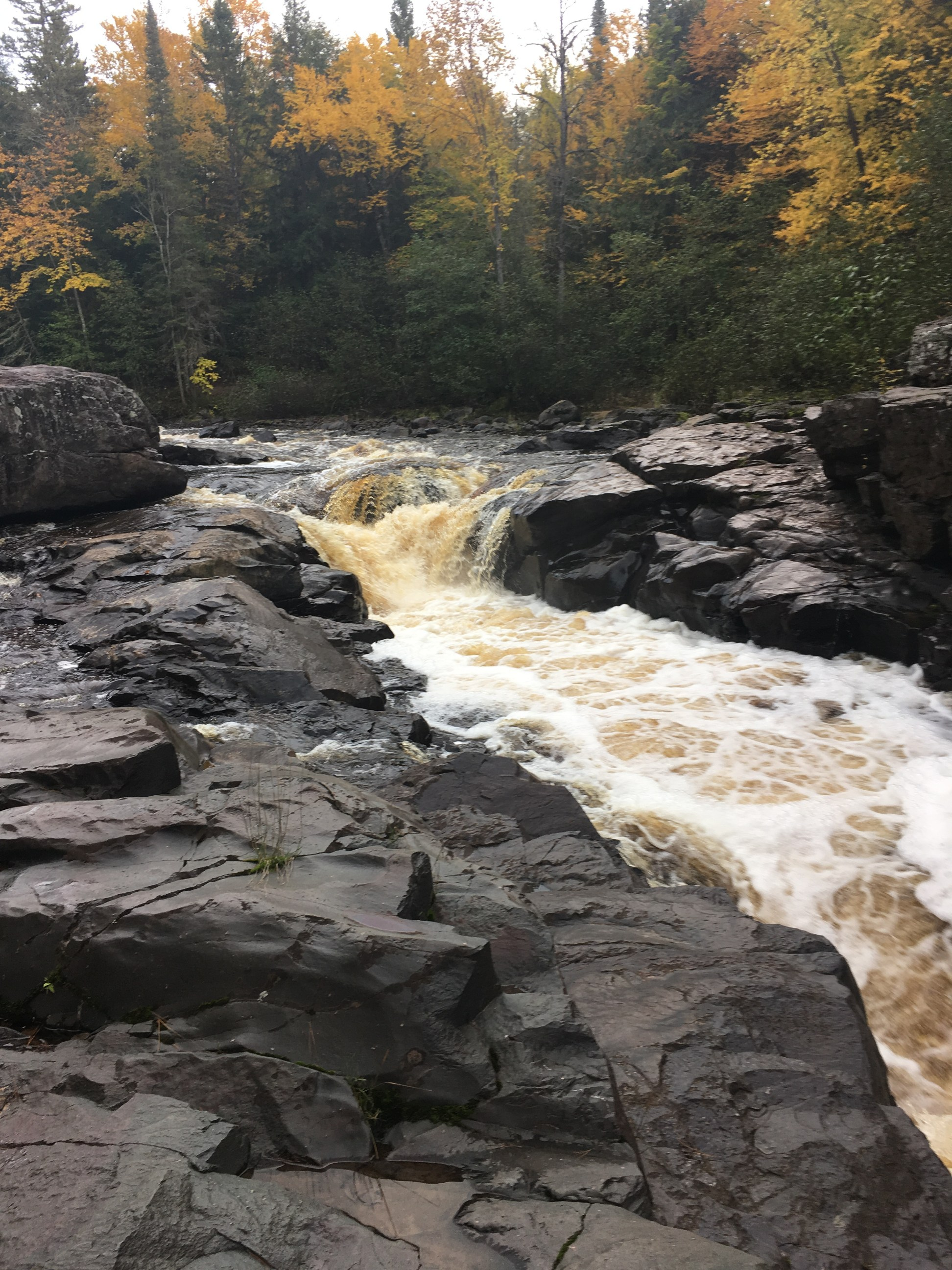
- Falls in the Gorge, October 2016

- Location within the United States
- Location: Baraga and Houghton counties, Michigan, United States
- Nearest city: Houghton, Michigan
- Coordinates: 46°36′32″N 88°42′08″W
- Area: 14,729 acres (5,961 ha)
- Established: 1987
- Governing body: U.S. Forest Service

The Sturgeon River Gorge Wilderness is a 14,729-acre (59.61 km^{2}) unit within the Ottawa National Forest. It is located in Baraga County and Houghton County within the U.S. state of Michigan. The wilderness is accessible from M-28, which runs south of the unit in a west-to-east direction. The nearest community is Sidnaw, Michigan, which is located approximately 4 miles (6.4 km) southwest of the wilderness unit's southern end.

Today, the Sturgeon River Gorge Wilderness is a roadless unit within the managed Ottawa Forest. The wilderness centers on the Sturgeon River, a Wild and Scenic River where it flows through and along the border of this wilderness. Along the wilderness's northeastern edge, the Sturgeon River flows through the Sturgeon River Gorge, a 300 feet (91 m) deep canyon, and the approximately 15-foot (4.6 m) waterfall, Sturgeon Falls. After leaving the wilderness, the Sturgeon River discharges itself into Portage Lake and, ultimately, into Lake Superior.

Large fauna within the Sturgeon River Gorge Wilderness include the black bear and the whitetail deer. Although the lake sturgeon gave its name to the Sturgeon River, as of 2011 few if any of these large fish return annually to the river to spawn. The ecosystem is that of a second-growth boreal forest, with the hemlock and aspen predominating. Larger hardwoods include the sugar maple, paper birch, and basswood. A few patches of the Michigan state tree, the white pine, have regrown from the logging activities that took here prior to 1910.

The Sturgeon River Gorge Wilderness was created by Congress in 1987.
