= Rock River (Sturgeon River tributary) =

River in northern Michigan

- Location within Michigan Location within the United States

Location
- Country: United States
- State: Michigan

Physical characteristics
- Source
  - location: Worm Lake
  - coordinates: 46.5468843°N 88.4754145°W
- Mouth: Sturgeon River
  - coordinates: 46.5938276°N 88.5412470°W
  - elevation: 1,227 ft (374 m)

The Rock River is a 6.1-mile-long (9.8 km) stream in Baraga County on the Upper Peninsula of Michigan in the United States. It rises at the outlet of Worm Lake, east of Covington, and flows northwest. It eventually empties into the Sturgeon River which continues west, then north to Portage Lake and Lake Superior. The Rock River descends 350 feet (110 m) over its 6-mile (10 km) course, for an average rate of 58 feet per mile.

== See also ==
- List of rivers of Michigan
