= Covington Township, Michigan =

- Civil township
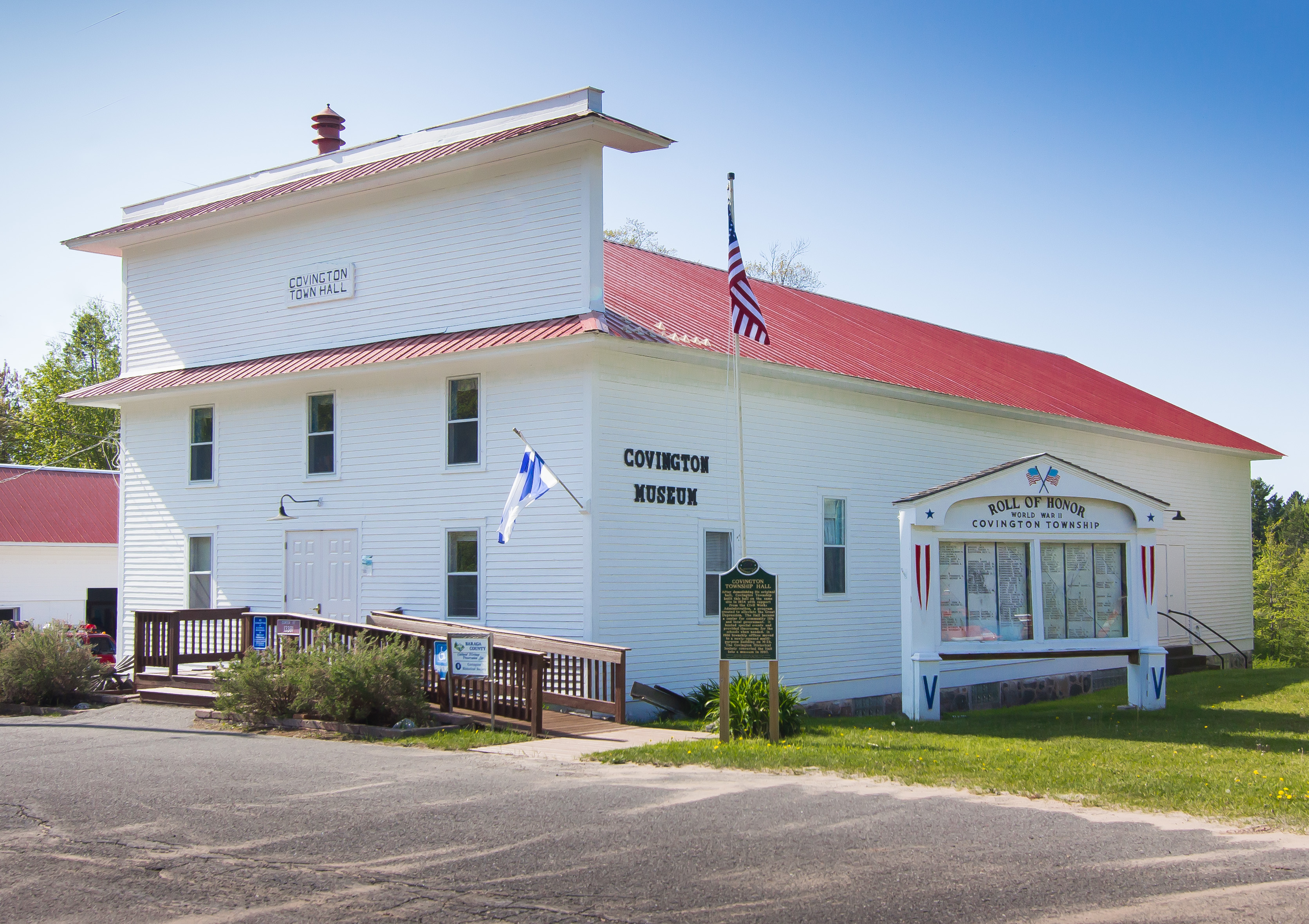
- The historic Covington Town Hall

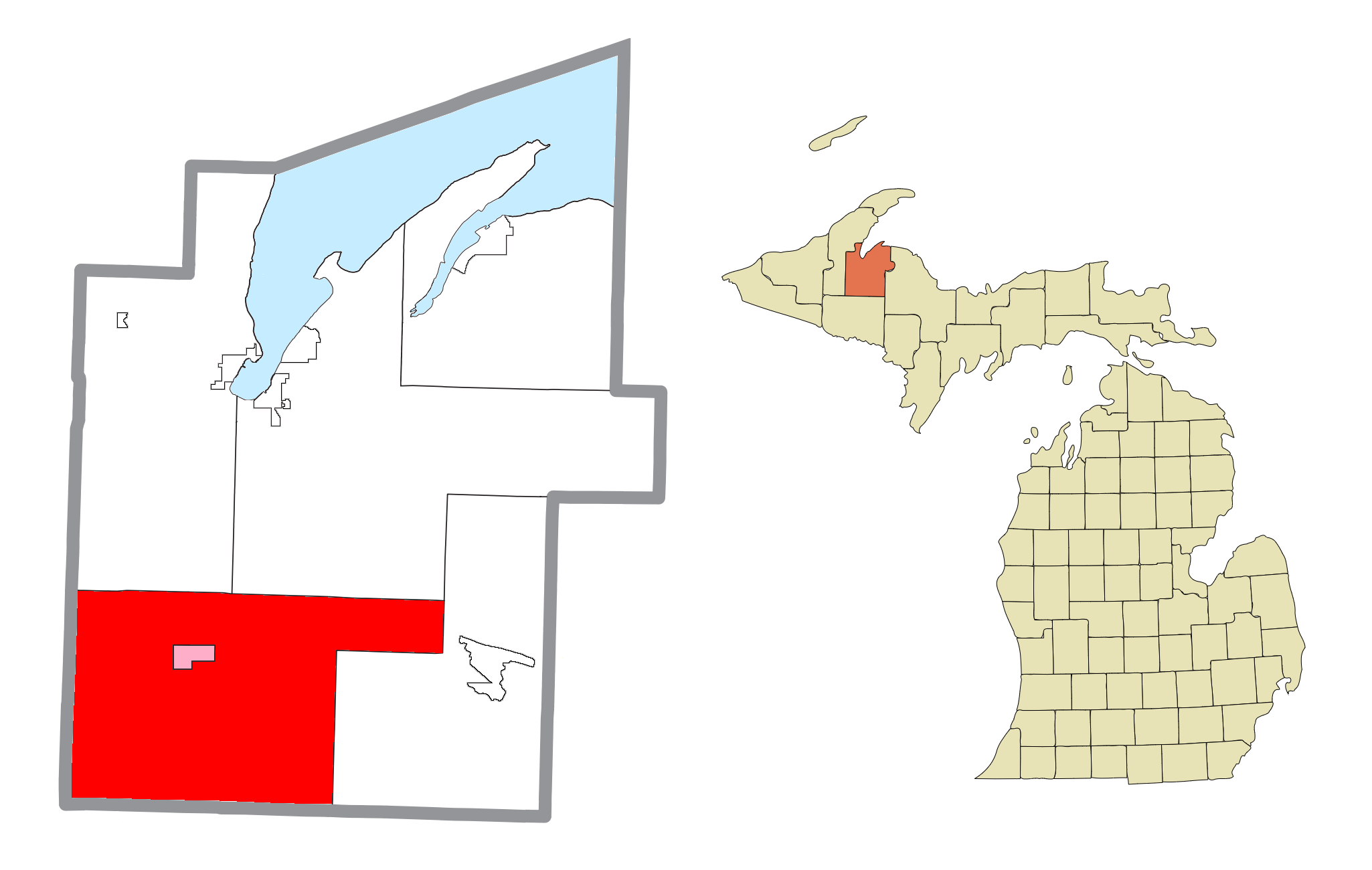
- Location within Baraga County (red) and the administered CDP of Covington (pink)

- Location within the state of Michigan Location within the United States
- Coordinates: 46°32′15″N 88°31′25″W
- Country: United States
- State: Michigan
- County: Baraga
- Established: 1893

Government
  - Supervisor: Amber Franti
  - Clerk: Amy Leaf

Area
  - Total: 196.33 sq mi (508.49 km^{2})
  - Land: 192.26 sq mi (497.95 km^{2})
  - Water: 1.07 sq mi (2.77 km^{2})
- Elevation: 1,627 ft (496 m)

Population (2020)
  - Total: 375
  - Density: 1.95/sq mi (0.75/km^{2})
- Time zone: UTC-5 (Eastern (EST))
  - Summer (DST): UTC-4 (EDT)
- ZIP code: 49919 (Covington); 49970 (Watton)
- Area code: 906
- FIPS code: 26-18600
- GNIS feature ID: 1626139
- Website: Official website

Covington Township is a civil township of Baraga County in the U.S. state of Michigan. The population was 375 at the 2020 census.

== Communities ==
- Covington is an unincorporated community and census-designated place on US 141 near the junction with M-28. The Covington ZIP code 49919 serves northern areas of the township.
- Leo is an unincorporated community in the township.
- Murphy is an unincorporated community in the township.
- Perch is an unincorporated community in the township.
- Tioga is a place name between the Tioga River and Pelkie Creek at 46°33′30″N 88°20′55″W.
- Tunis is a place name on the Perch River at 46°33′30″N 88°30′35″W.
- Vermilac is a place at 46°31′51″N 88°27′32″W.
- Watton is an unincorporated community at 46°32′15″N 88°36′23″W about 4 miles (6 km) west of Covington on M-28. This stop on the Duluth, South Shore, and Atlantic Railroad is a Finnish village, established by August Kotila in 1903. A post office was established in 1912. The Watton ZIP code 49970 serves southwestern areas of Covington Township.

== Geography ==
According to the United States Census Bureau, the township has a total area of 196.3 square miles (508.5 km^{2}), of which 192.2 square miles (497.9 km^{2}) is land and 4.1 square miles (10.5 km^{2}), or 2.07%, is water.

King Lake and Worm Lake are located in Covington Township.

=== Climate ===
According to the Köppen Climate Classification system, Covington has a warm-summer humid continental climate, abbreviated "Dfb" on climate maps. The hottest temperature recorded in Covington was 95 °F (35.0 °C) on June 21, 2022, while the coldest temperature recorded was −27 °F (−32.8 °C) on February 1, 2019.

Climate data for Covington (Watton), Michigan, 1991–2020 normals, extremes 2000–present
Month	Jan	Feb	Mar	Apr	May	Jun	Jul	Aug	Sep	Oct	Nov	Dec	Year
Record high °F (°C)	50 (10)	63 (17)	79 (26)	84 (29)	91 (33)	95 (35)	93 (34)	93 (34)	88 (31)	84 (29)	74 (23)	53 (12)	95 (35)
Mean maximum °F (°C)	38.8 (3.8)	42.7 (5.9)	57.9 (14.4)	70.7 (21.5)	83.3 (28.5)	84.8 (29.3)	87.4 (30.8)	85.6 (29.8)	80.6 (27.0)	73.4 (23.0)	58.3 (14.6)	43.5 (6.4)	88.4 (31.3)
Mean daily maximum °F (°C)	21.9 (−5.6)	25.3 (−3.7)	36.8 (2.7)	49.1 (9.5)	63.7 (17.6)	72.0 (22.2)	75.7 (24.3)	74.4 (23.6)	66.9 (19.4)	53.1 (11.7)	38.4 (3.6)	27.4 (−2.6)	50.4 (10.2)
Daily mean °F (°C)	13.9 (−10.1)	16.1 (−8.8)	25.4 (−3.7)	37.9 (3.3)	51.4 (10.8)	60.5 (15.8)	64.4 (18.0)	63.3 (17.4)	56.1 (13.4)	43.7 (6.5)	31.4 (−0.3)	20.0 (−6.7)	40.3 (4.6)
Mean daily minimum °F (°C)	5.9 (−14.5)	6.8 (−14.0)	14.1 (−9.9)	26.6 (−3.0)	39.2 (4.0)	49.0 (9.4)	53.2 (11.8)	52.1 (11.2)	45.3 (7.4)	34.3 (1.3)	24.3 (−4.3)	12.6 (−10.8)	30.3 (−0.9)
Mean minimum °F (°C)	−12.7 (−24.8)	−14.8 (−26.0)	−10.8 (−23.8)	10.1 (−12.2)	24.9 (−3.9)	32.4 (0.2)	41.3 (5.2)	39.5 (4.2)	31.0 (−0.6)	21.6 (−5.8)	8.1 (−13.3)	−5.4 (−20.8)	−17.8 (−27.7)
Record low °F (°C)	−26 (−32)	−27 (−33)	−22 (−30)	−3 (−19)	19 (−7)	27 (−3)	34 (1)	34 (1)	26 (−3)	14 (−10)	−8 (−22)	−19 (−28)	−27 (−33)
Average precipitation inches (mm)	1.72 (44)	1.41 (36)	1.53 (39)	3.20 (81)	3.02 (77)	3.42 (87)	3.60 (91)	2.98 (76)	3.53 (90)	3.36 (85)	2.45 (62)	1.72 (44)	31.94 (812)
Average snowfall inches (cm)	24.8 (63)	20.9 (53)	13.6 (35)	15.6 (40)	1.0 (2.5)	0.0 (0.0)	0.0 (0.0)	0.0 (0.0)	0.0 (0.0)	3.8 (9.7)	16.9 (43)	24.7 (63)	121.3 (309.2)
Average extreme snow depth inches (cm)	18.7 (47)	23.5 (60)	23.4 (59)	12.9 (33)	1.3 (3.3)	0.0 (0.0)	0.0 (0.0)	0.0 (0.0)	0.0 (0.0)	1.4 (3.6)	7.2 (18)	11.7 (30)	25.9 (66)
Average precipitation days (≥ 0.01 in)	19.7	15.6	11.1	13.4	13.0	11.6	11.4	10.6	13.9	15.8	16.4	19.2	171.7
Average snowy days (≥ 0.1 in)	19.5	16.0	8.8	7.6	1.3	0.0	0.0	0.0	0.1	3.1	12.3	17.9	86.6
Source 1: NOAA
Source 2: National Weather Service (mean maxima/minima, snow depth 2006–2020)

== Demographics ==
At the 2020 census, it had a population of 375.
