= Covington, Michigan =

- Census-designated place (CDP) & unincorporated community
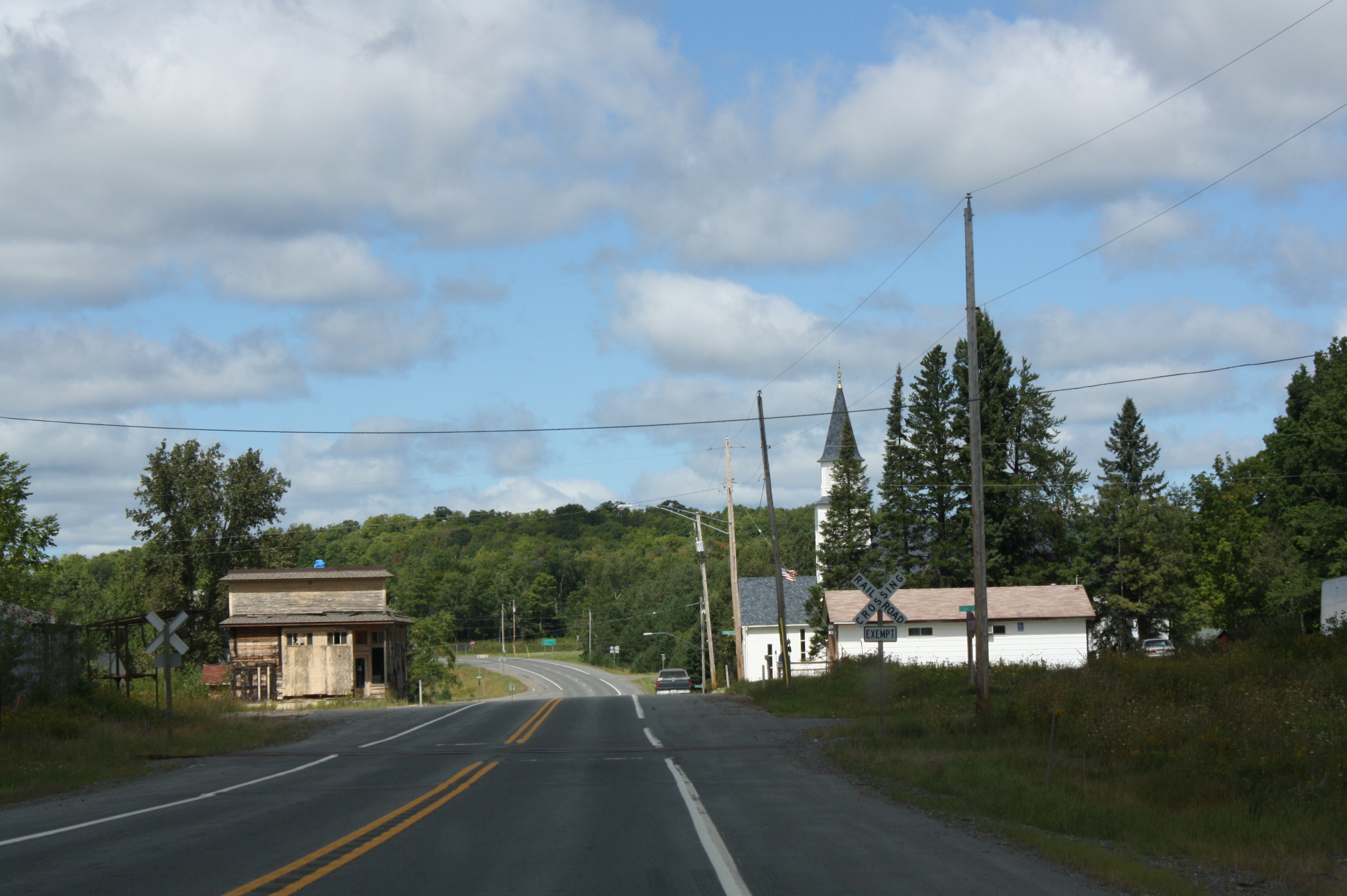
- Community of Covington along US 141

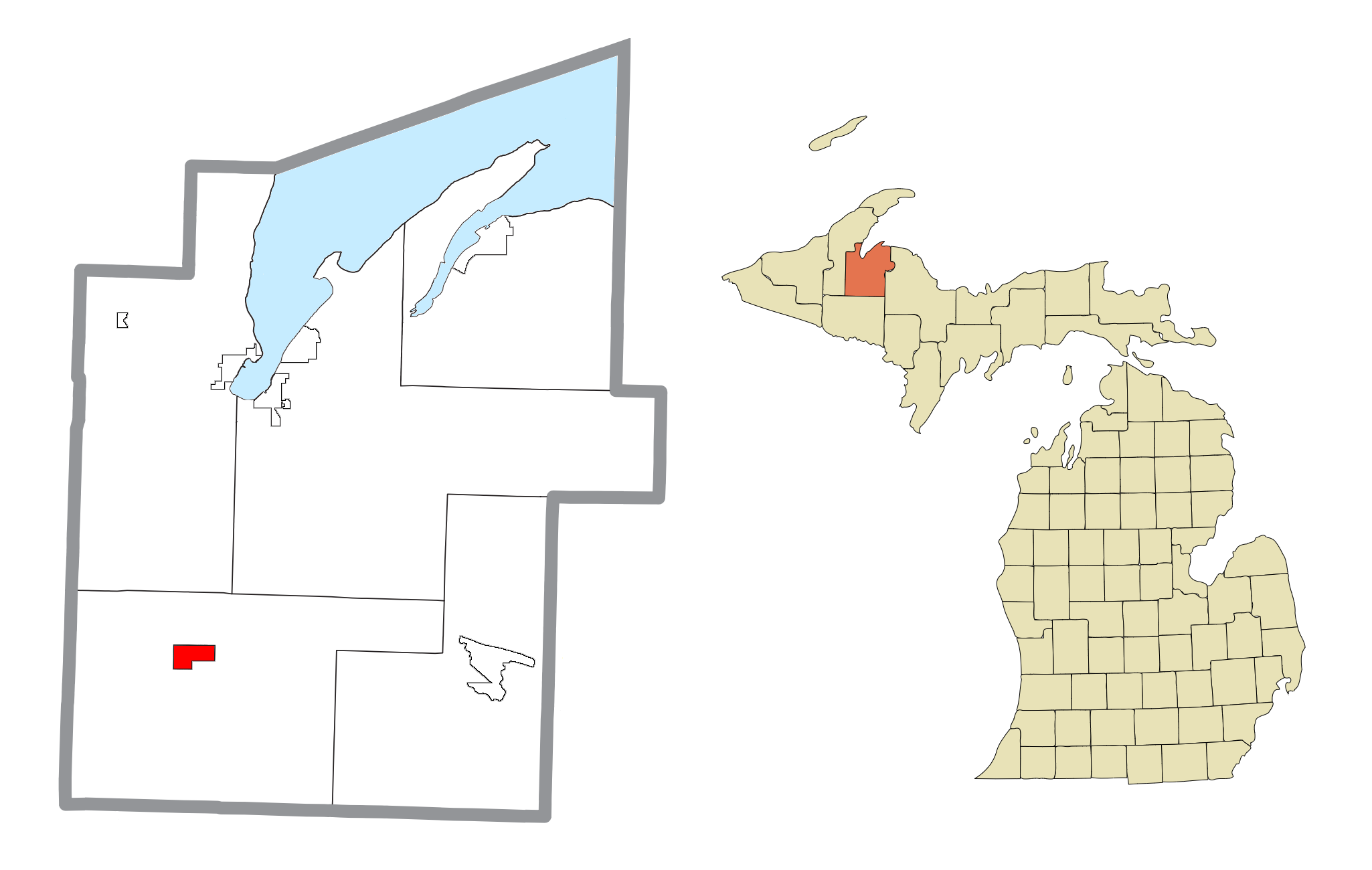
- Location within Baraga County

- Location within the state of Michigan Location within the United States
- Coordinates: 46°32′29″N 88°32′13″W
- Country: United States
- State: Michigan
- County: Baraga
- Township: Covington
- Settled: 1885

Area
  - Total: 3.55 sq mi (9.19 km^{2})
  - Land: 3.54 sq mi (9.18 km^{2})
  - Water: 0.0039 sq mi (0.01 km^{2})
- Elevation: 1,598 ft (487 m)

Population (2020)
  - Total: 99
  - Density: 27.97/sq mi (10.80/km^{2})
- Time zone: UTC-5 (Eastern (EST))
  - Summer (DST): UTC-4 (EDT)
- ZIP code(s): 49919
- Area code: 906
- GNIS feature ID: 623922

Covington is an unincorporated community and census-designated place (CDP) in Baraga County in the U.S. state of Michigan. The CDP had a population of 99 at the 2020 census. The community is located within Covington Township along US Highway 141 (US 141) near the junction with M-28, which is a few miles west of US 41.

== History ==
Covington was first settled by French-Canadians around 1885, and was named for the postmaster's home town of Covington, Kentucky. The community was a stop along the Duluth, South Shore and Atlantic Railway.

As the amount of forest land declined due to logging, farming became more prevalent. When a number of Finnish settlers started arriving in 1898, eventually outnumbering the small French and Swedish population, they planted fields of potatoes, corn, and wheat, and started pasturing milk cows. Others found work in the booming logging industry, buoyed by an abundant supply of cordwood and pulpwood.

A temperance society Onnen Satama, meaning Harbor of Luck, was the first Finnish organization in Covington, and was organized on November 28, 1899.

One year later, the Finnish Lutherans established the Covington Evangelical Lutheran Church. The church underwent a number of repairs and modifications over the ensuing years, but an altar painting offered to the church in 1931 by Professor Elmer A. Forsberg of the Chicago Art Institute resulted in the largest modification to date. Art Institute staff drew up plans to enlarge and remodel the church, which added the sanctuary, sacristy, and sexton's room. The interior was decorated in an Art Deco meets Finland style, with wood paneling, a candelabra, chandeliers, hand carved images of St. John and St. Peter, altar, and pulpit all designed by the Art Institute. In 1950 the church was renamed as the Bethany Evangelical Lutheran Church, and today is a tourist attraction while still having an active congregation.

Nowadays, Covington is probably best known for its Finnish Music Festival, which is held around the Fourth of July every year and features musicians playing Finnish-inspired music on Finnish instruments. The daylong festival also features breakfast, church tours, and an all-day chicken barbecue. The community is also home to the UP Made Artist Market, a project of the non-profit Community Women's Group that is open from May to October.

Along with crop and dairy farming, the lumber industry is still the largest source of income for residents today. However, increasing costs and decreasing prices have led many farmers to leave for the mining operations in Michigamme and Negaunee.

== Demographics ==
Historical population
Census	Pop.	Note	%±
2020	99		—
U.S. Decennial Census

The CDP had a population of 99 in 2020.

== Notable people ==
- Rosa Lemberg (1875–1959), Finnish American teacher, choral conductor and socialist

== Gallery ==
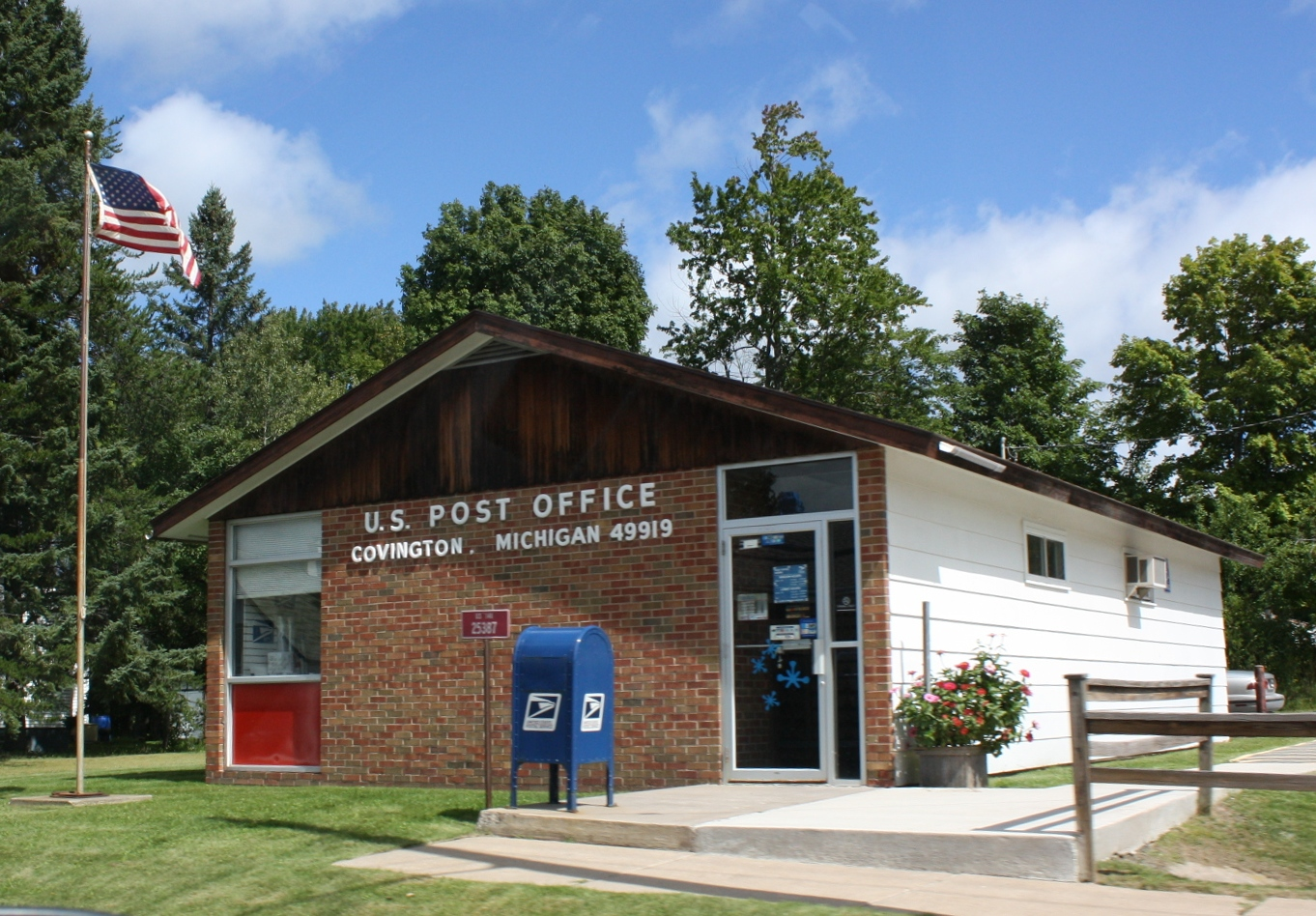
Post office

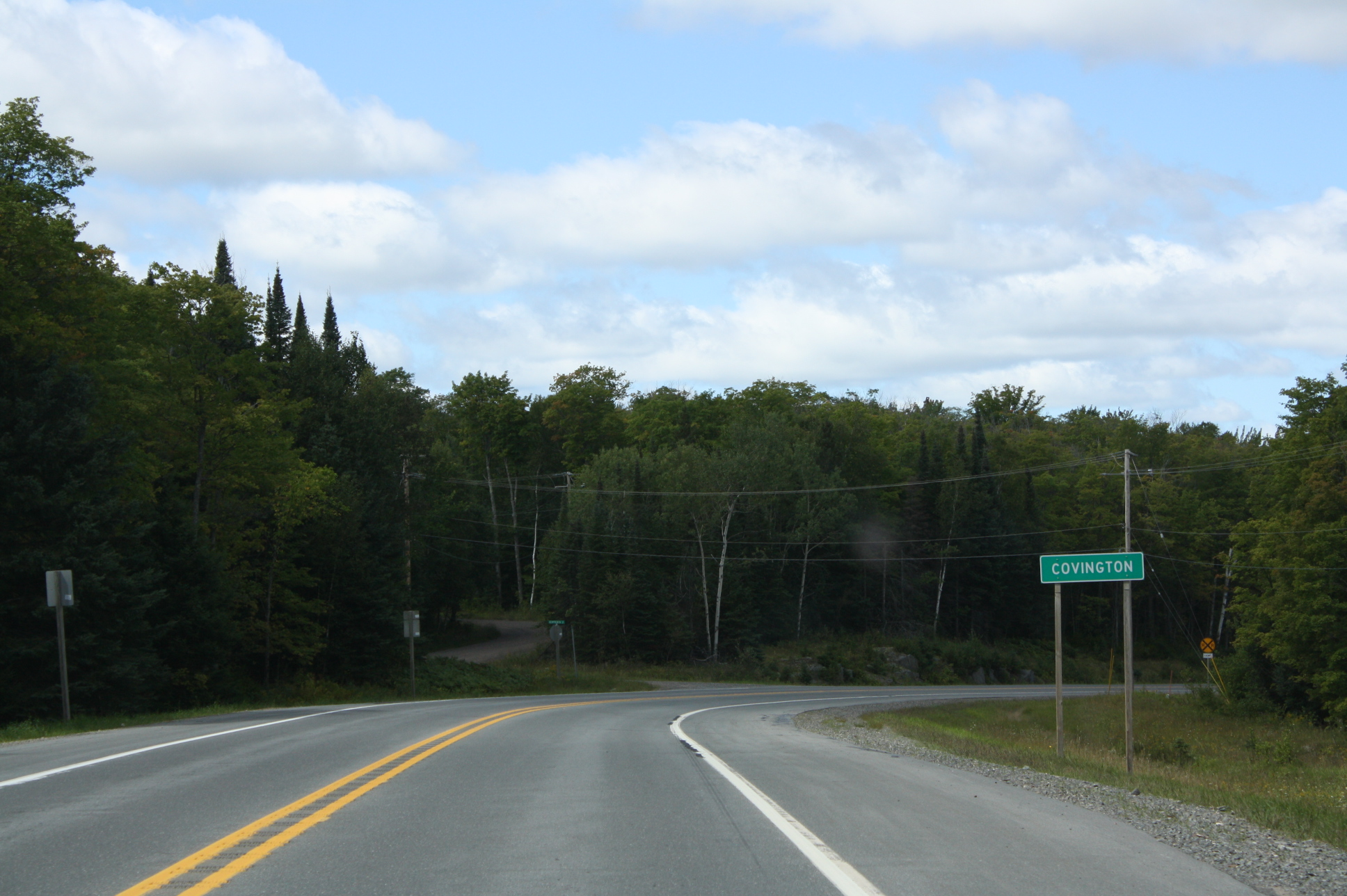
Sign
