= Chassell, Michigan =

Chassell, Michigan Ginoozhe-wiikwed (Ojibwe)
- Census-designated place (CDP) & unincorporated community
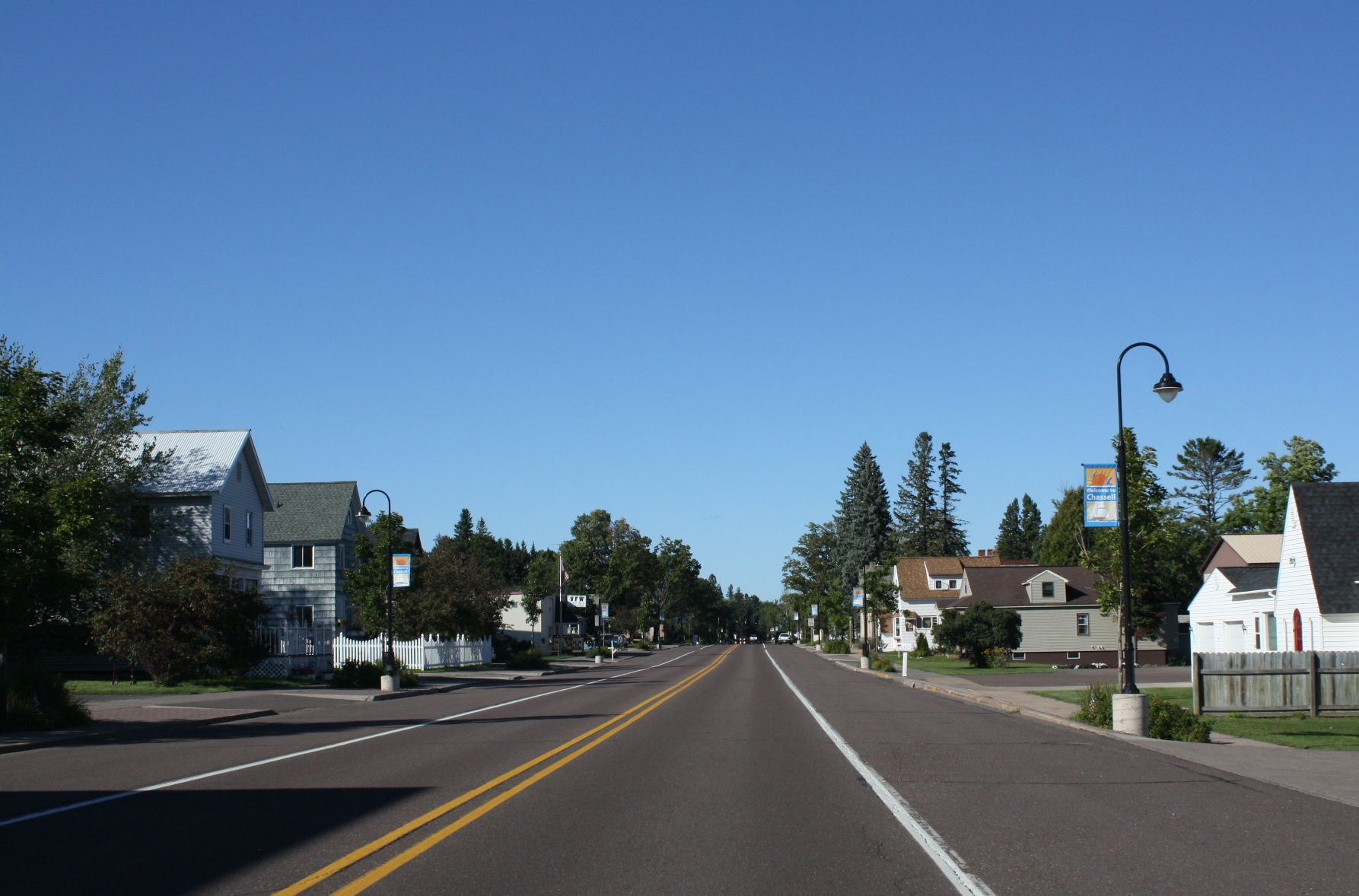
- Downtown Chassell along US Highway 41

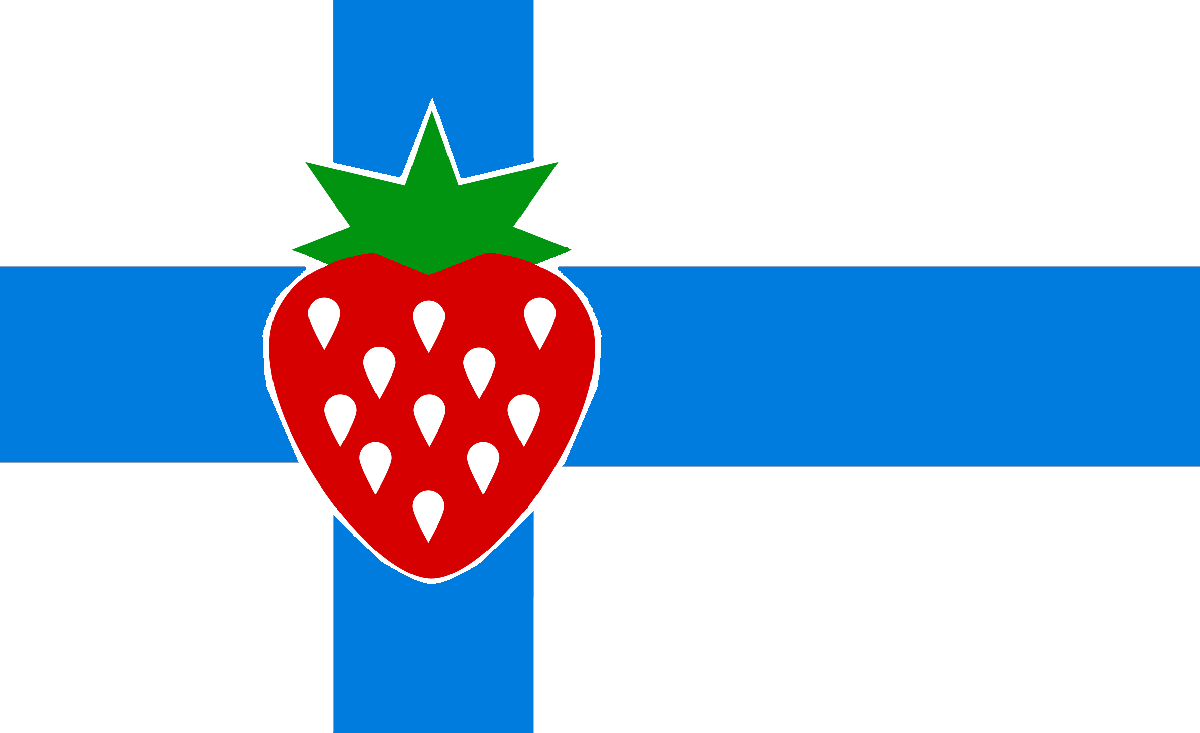
- Flag
- Nickname: "Strawberry Capital of the Upper Peninsula"
- Location within Michigan
- Coordinates: 47°01′42″N 88°31′30″W
- Country: United States
- State: Michigan
- County: Houghton
- Township: Chassell

Area
  - Total: 3.62 sq mi (9.37 km^{2})
  - Land: 3.61 sq mi (9.36 km^{2})
  - Water: 0 sq mi (0.00 km^{2})
- Elevation: 676 ft (206 m)

Population (2020)
  - Total: 876
  - Density: 242.3/sq mi (93.57/km^{2})
- Time zone: UTC-5 (Eastern (EST))
  - Summer (DST): UTC-4 (EDT)
- ZIP code(s): 49916
- Area code: 906
- GNIS feature ID: 2806333

Chassell (/ˈtʃæsəl/ CHA-səl) is an unincorporated community and census-designated place (CDP) in Houghton County in the U.S. state of Michigan. Chassell had a population of 876 at the 2020 census and is located within Chassell Townshipwhich is on the shore of Portage Lake in the Upper Peninsula. As an unincorporated community, Chassell has no legal autonomy of its own, however it does have a post office with the ZIP code 49916.

Chassell is known for the Copper County Strawberry Festival, which is held the weekend after the 4th of July.

== History ==
In 1855, the land that included what was to become Chassell was acquired from the state of Michigan by the St. Mary's Canal and Land Company. In 1863, Francis Jacker built one of the first buildings in the area, a log cabin close to the mouth of the Sturgeon River. In 1867, John Chassell (1814–1883) of New York, purchased farmland from the St. Mary's Canal and Land Company where the community is now located. In 1865, Chassell was influential in raising the $160,000 capital with which the First National Bank of Houghton was founded. Chassell served as the first Cashier of the bank. He was also a founding member of a major contributor to the Houghton County Historical Society and Mining Institute.

Chassell sold his land in 1881 to Orrin W. Robinson, manager of the Sturgeon River Lumber Company and later Lieutenant Governor of Michigan. Robinson lived in Chassell's home until later building a new one on the same lot. The company was established in 1872 and owned large tracts of land in the area and with mill operations in Hancock. The owners of that company also organized the Sturgeon River Boom Company in 1875, which dug a canal to bring logs from the Sturgeon to Pike Bay. To accommodate expansion, the mills and principal operations were moved from Hancock to Chassell in 1887-88. By that time, the Duluth, South Shore and Atlantic Railway had extended a line to the area with a stop at Chassell. The first post office was established there in February 1888.

On April 14, 1888, Chassell Township was organized. The name was taken from the community, which had been named in honor of John Chassell by Robinson. The area had at first been known simply as Pike's Bay and later as Robinson. However, there was at that time another post office with the name Robinson in Ottawa County, Michigan and postal regulations did not allow two offices with the same name in the same state.

For the 2020 census, Chassell was included as a newly-listed census-designated place.

== Geography ==
According to the U.S. Census Bureau, the Chassell CDP has a total area of 3.62 square miles (9.38 km^{2}), all of which is land.

Chassell lies on Pike Bay, a bay of Portage Lake, near the mouth of the Sturgeon River. The community lies about 6.1 miles (9.8 km) south of the city of Houghton.

== Demographics ==
Historical population
Census	Pop.	Note	%±
2020	876		—
U.S. Decennial Census

== Education ==
The high school building was built in 1912 and, together with a 1917 elementary school, has been on the National Register of Historic Places since 2009 as the Chassell School Complex. In 1992, the schools were moved to Chassell Township School, which serves as a K-12 public school.

== Transportation ==
- Indian Trails bus lines operates daily intercity bus service between Hancock, Michigan, and Milwaukee, Wisconsin.

=== Major highway ===
- US 41 follows a north–south route through the community. The highway can be used to access Baraga, L'Anse, and Marquette, to the south, and Houghton and Hancock, to the north.

== Images ==
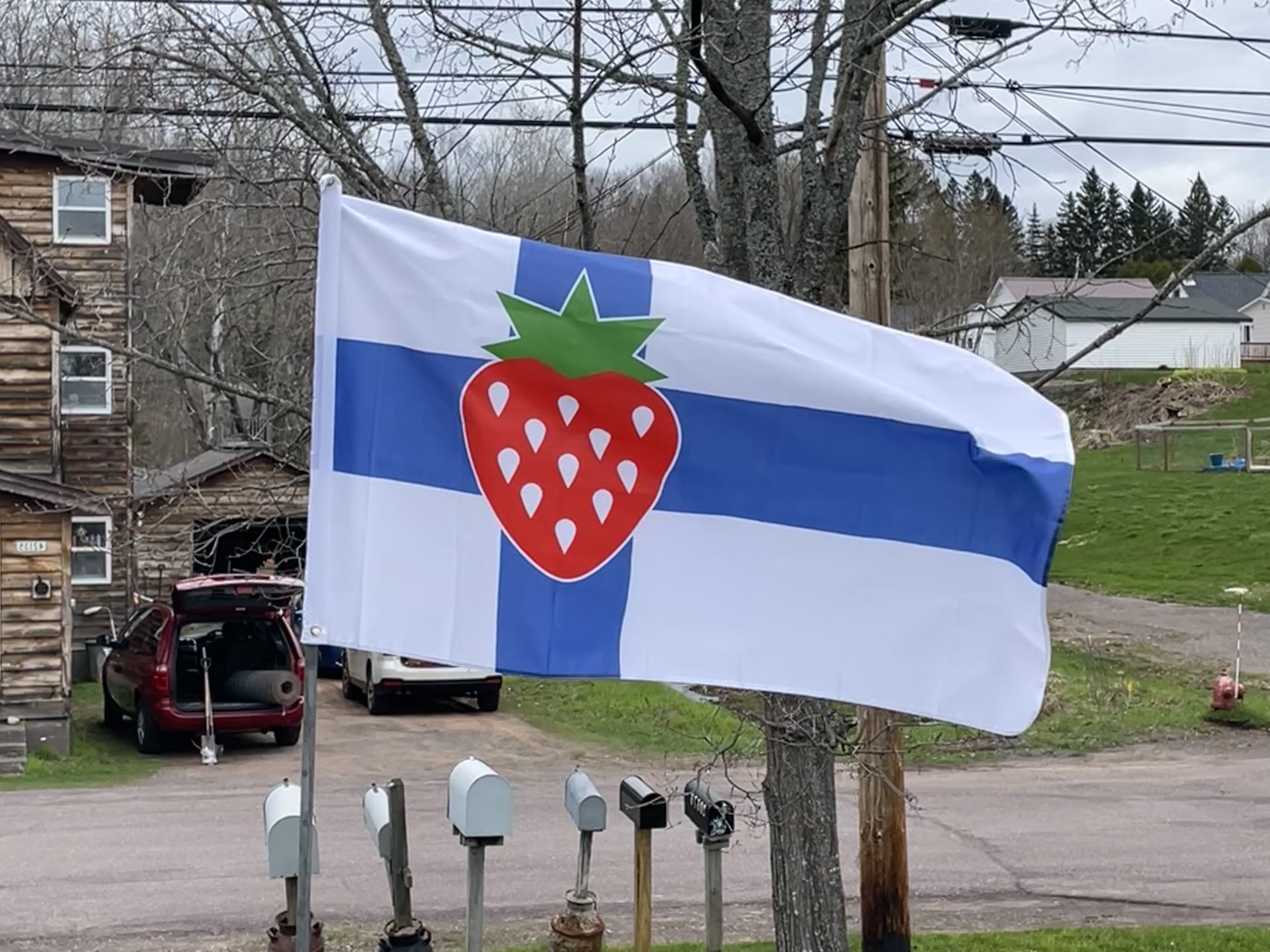
Flag of Chassell

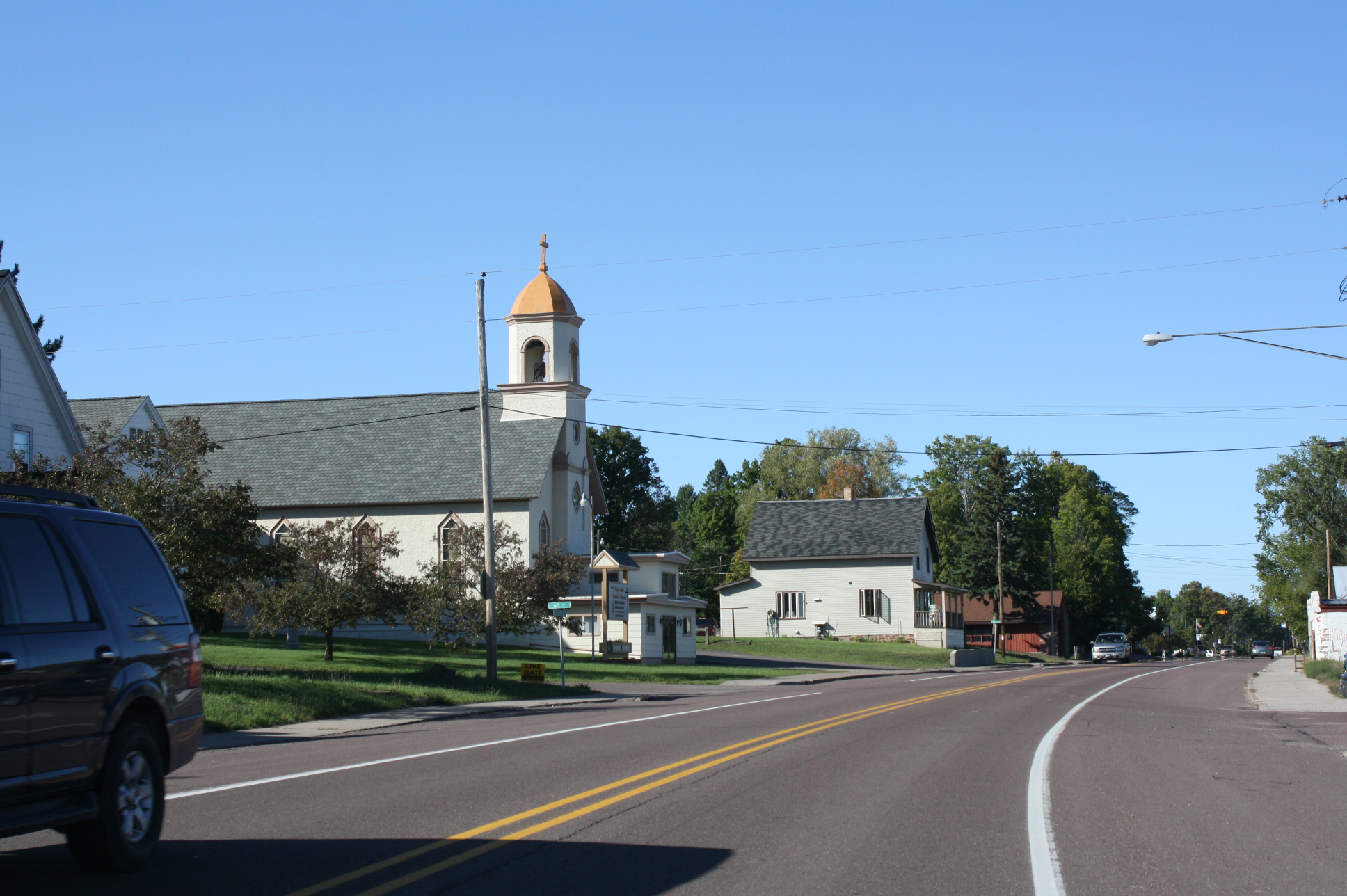
Downtown Chassell

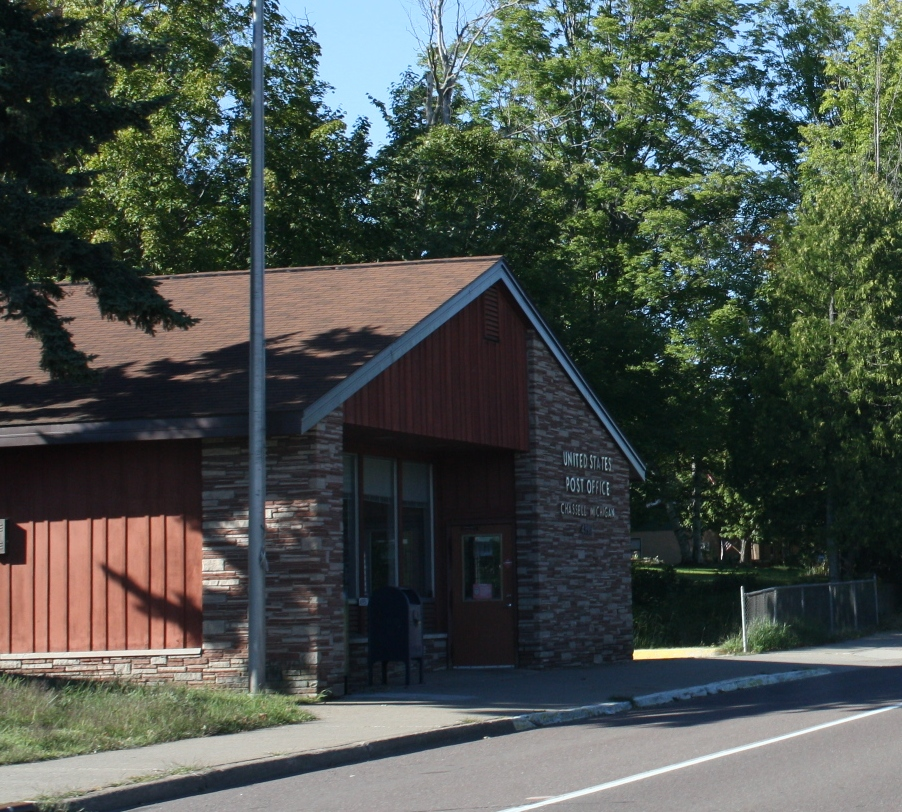
Post office

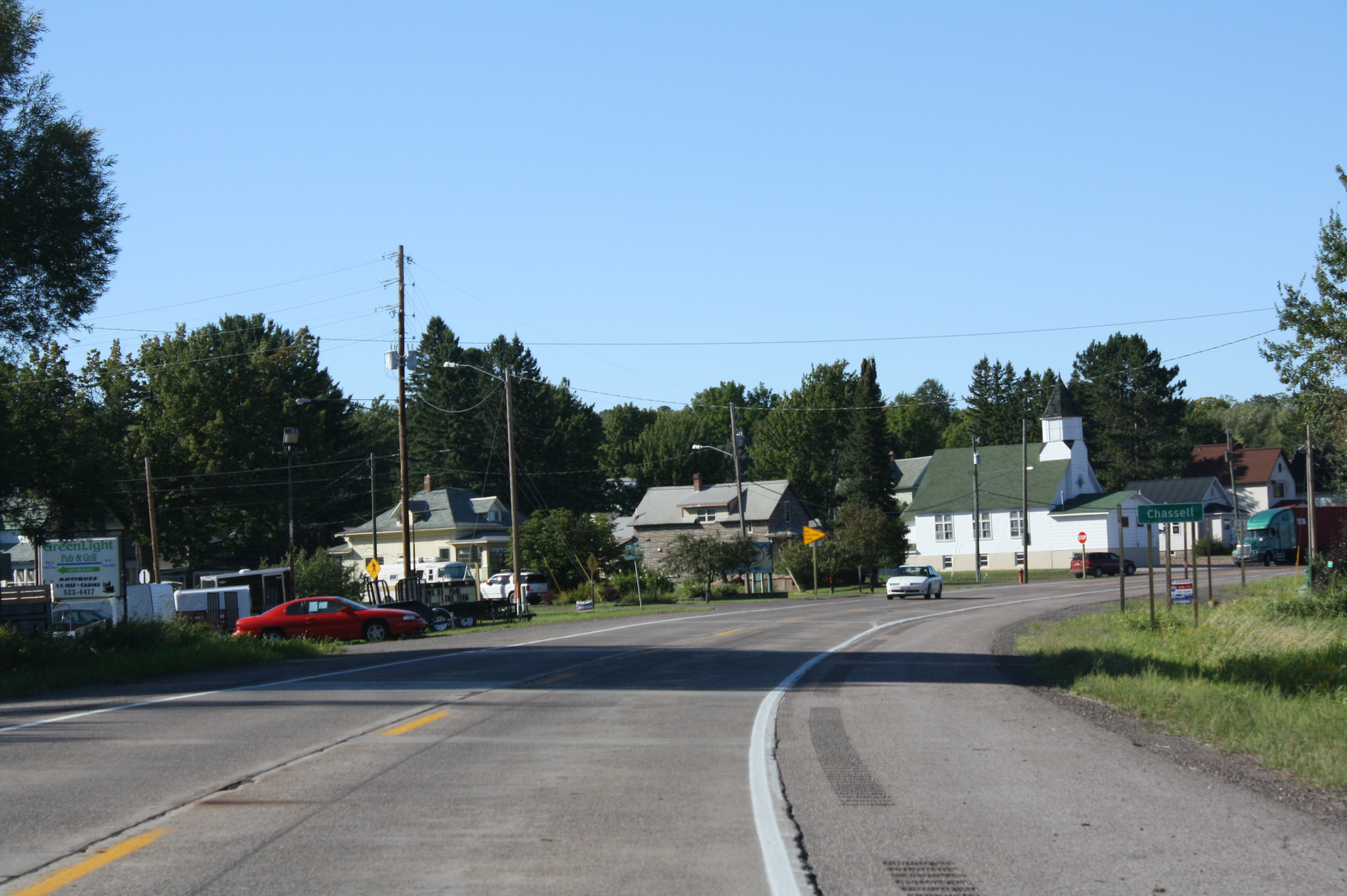
Entering Chassell on US Route 41

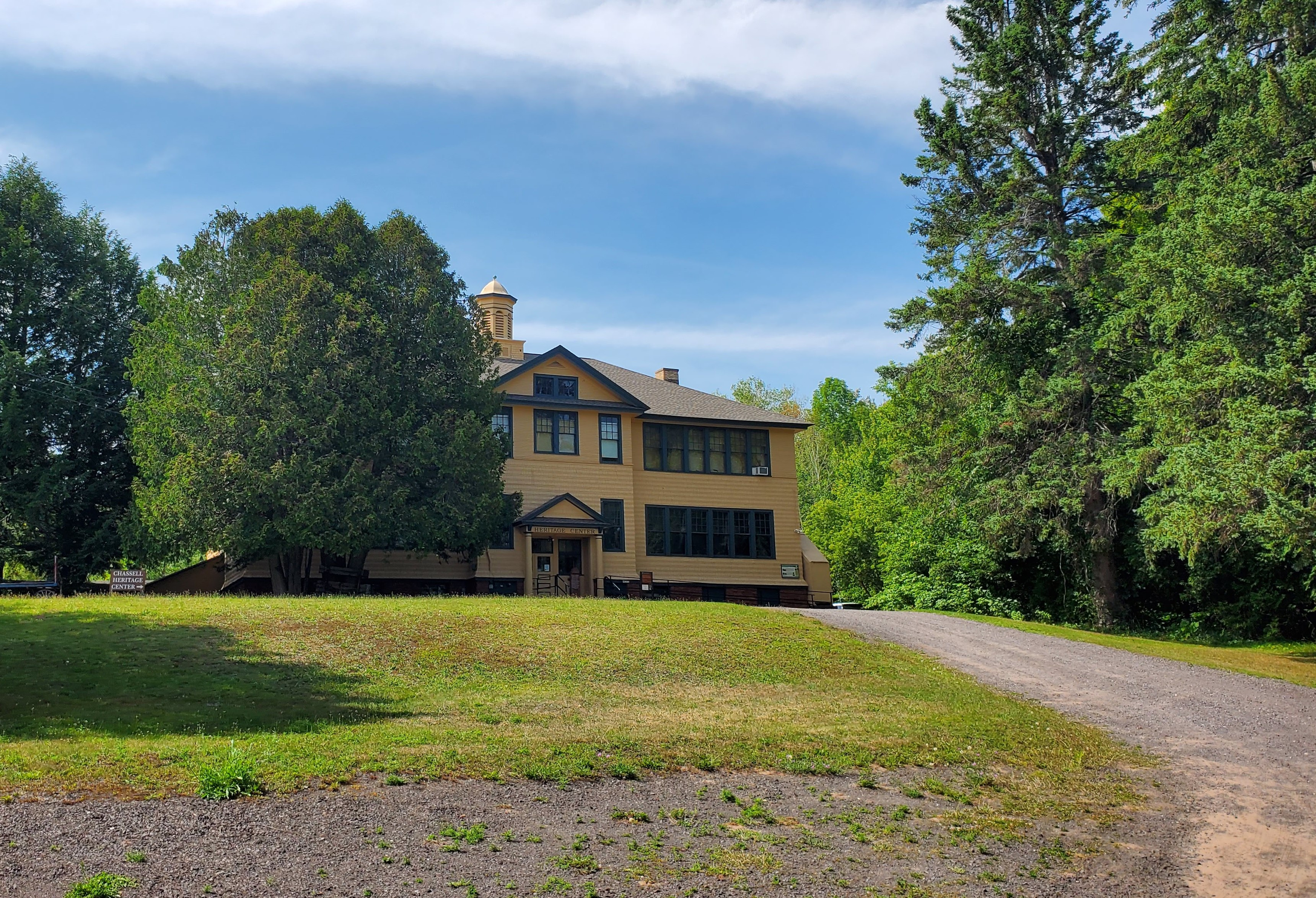
Chassell Historical Organization

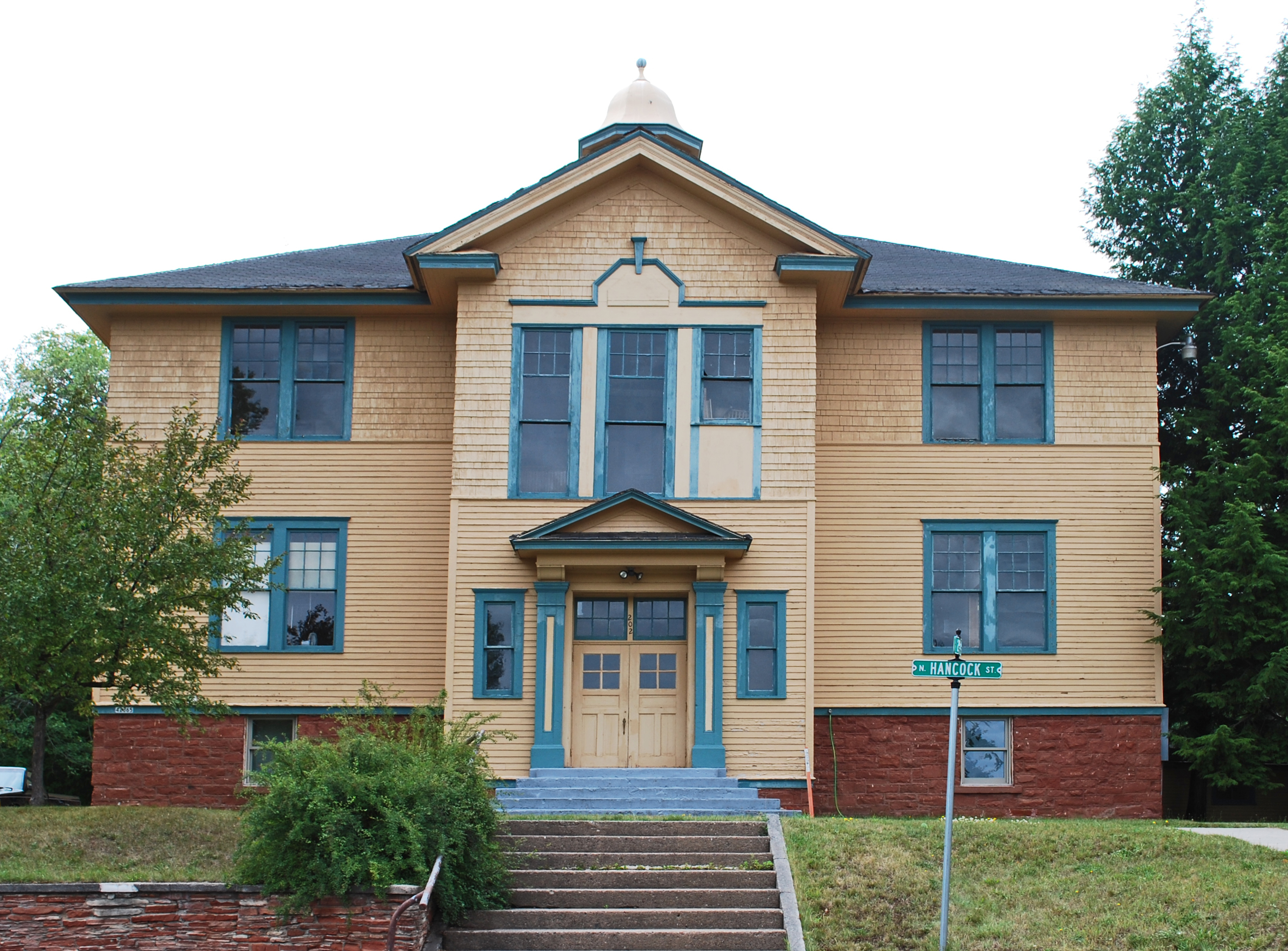
Chassell School Complex

== See also ==
- Copper mining in Michigan
