= Chassell School Complex =

- U.S. National Register of Historic Places
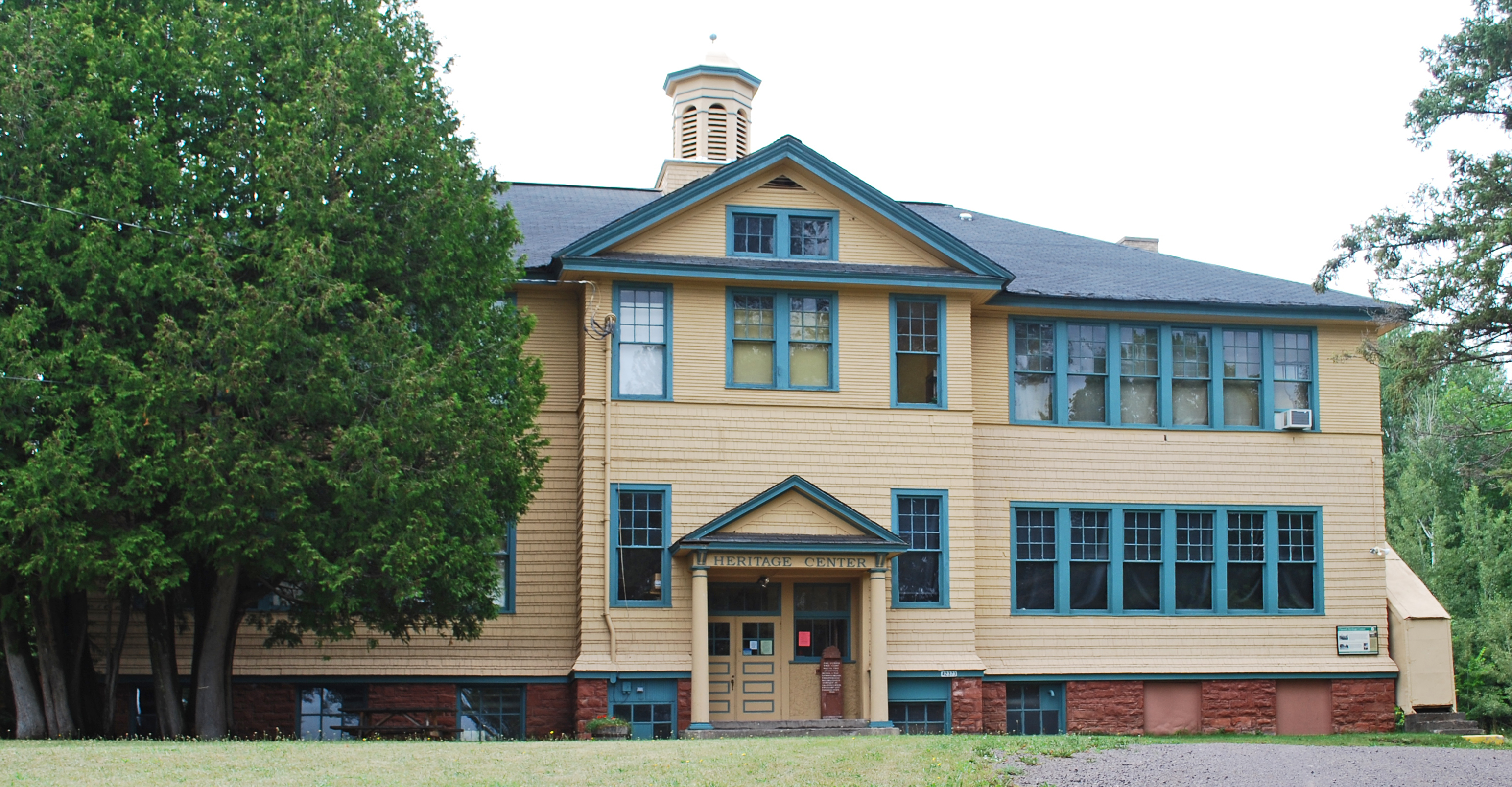
- Southwell Elementary School, now the Chassell Heritage Center
- Interactive map
- Location: 42373, 42365 N. Hancock St., Chassell, Michigan
- Coordinates: 47°01′52″N 88°31′33″W
- Built: 1912, 1917
- Architect: Maass Brothers
- NRHP reference No.: 09000473
- Added to NRHP: July 1, 2009

The Chassell School Complex consists of two structures, originally built as school buildings, located at 42373 and 42365 North Hancock Street in Chassell, Michigan, United States.. The building at 42373 North Hancock currently houses the Chassell Heritage Center. The two buildings were listed on the National Register of Historic Places in 2009.

== History ==
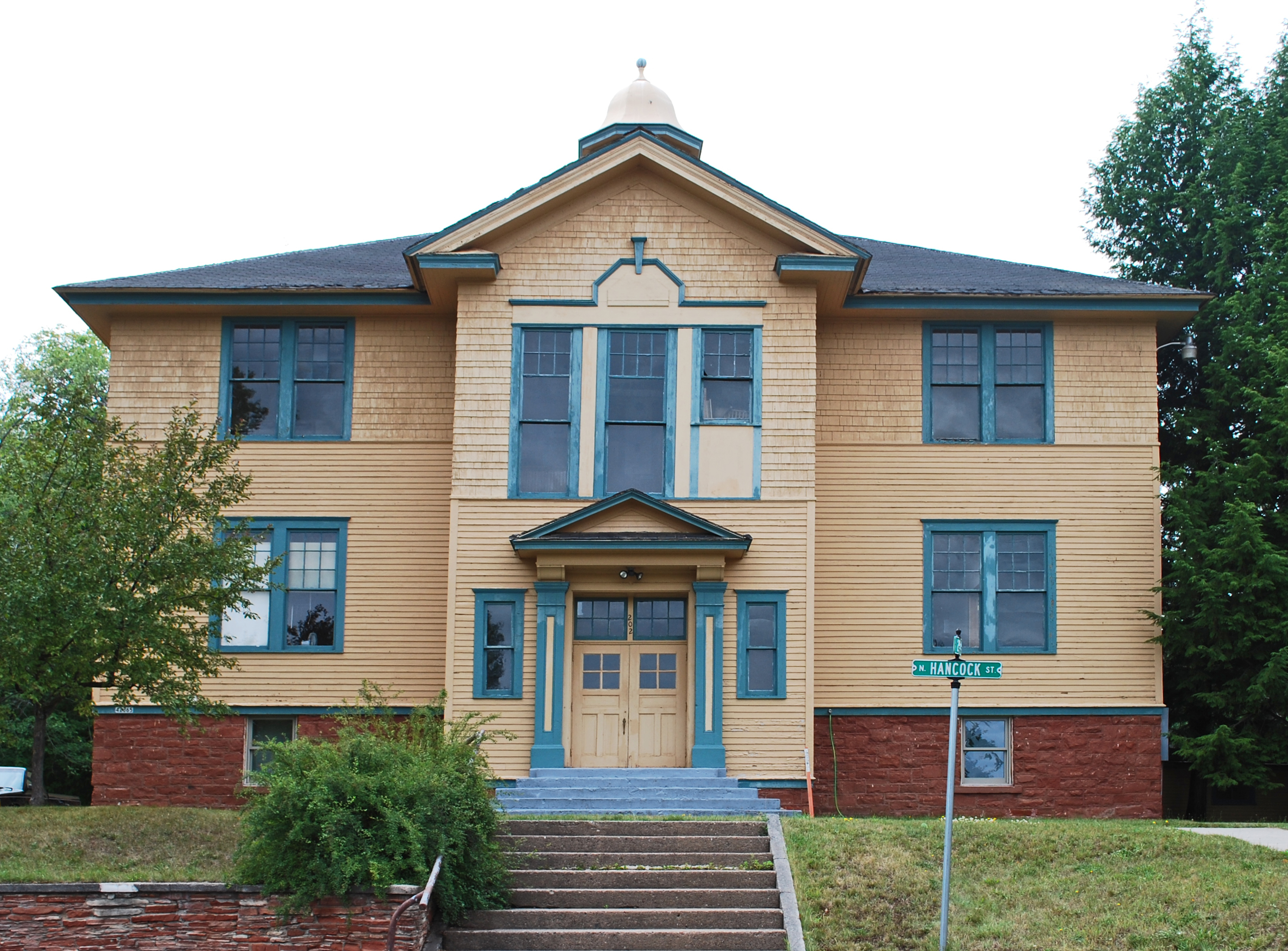
High school

The Chassell High School, located at 42365 N. Hancock, was built in 1912, and was designed by Charles and Frederick Maass. The school is a two-story frame structure measuring 58 by 46 feet, with clapboard siding on the first floor and shingling on the second. It has a hipped roof with a cupola. The two classrooms on the second floor were separated by a rolling partition to allow the rooms to be combined into a larger hall. The structure was used as a school until 1992.

The nearby Southwell Elementary School at 42373 N. Hancock was built in 1917. Due to its similarity in design to the high school, it was likely also designed by the Maass brothers; however, there is no documentation to support this. The structure was named after Mr. and Mrs. Southwell, parents of Mrs. C.H. Worcester, who donated the land the school sits on. It was used as a school until 1991.

== Chassell Heritage Center ==
Since 1993, the elementary school building has been home to the Chassell Heritage Center, which includes the Chassell Township Museum and the Friends of Fashion Vintage Clothing Collection.
