= Sturgeon River (Houghton County, Michigan) =

River in Michigan, United States

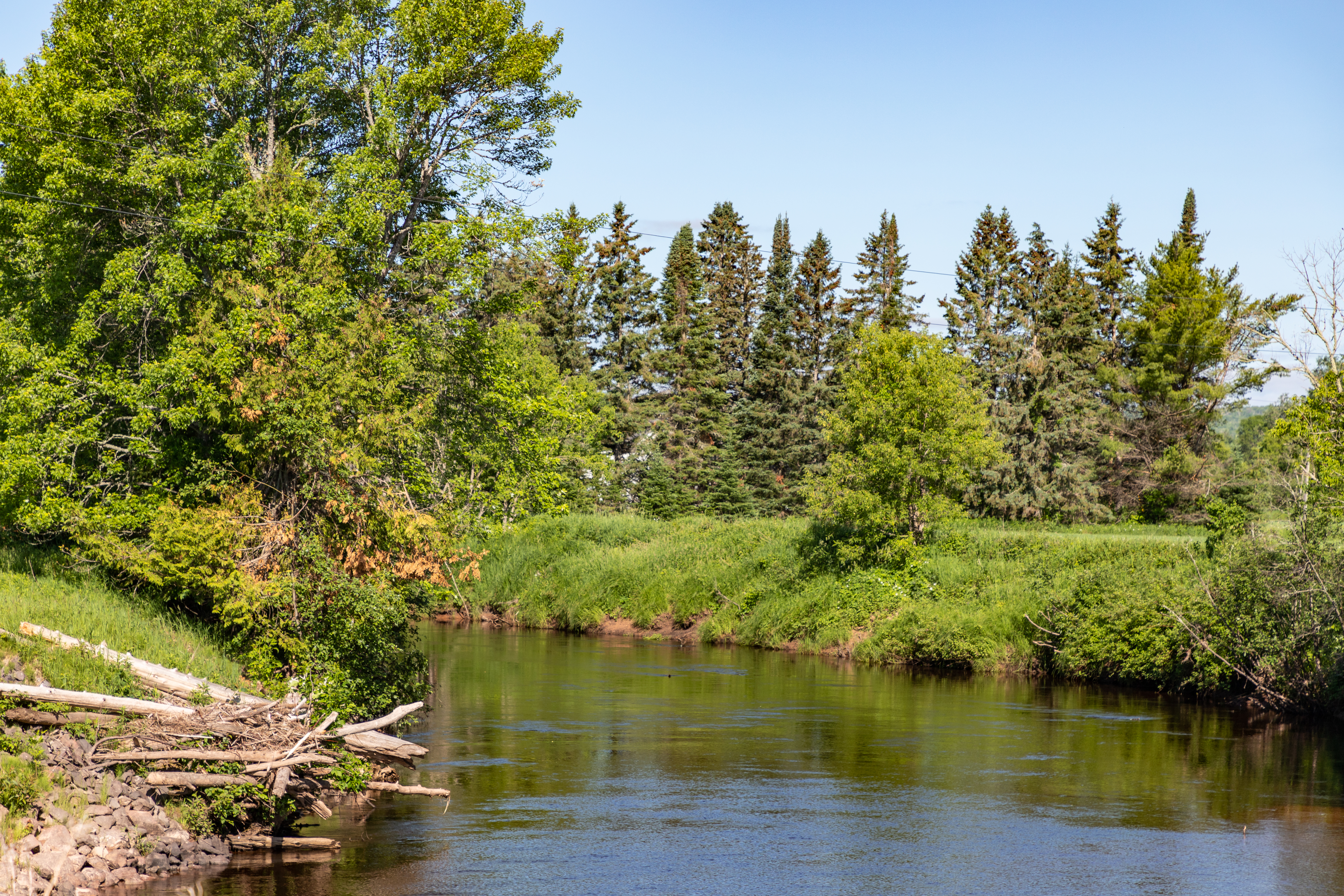

Location
- Country: United States

Physical characteristics
- Source
  - location: Baraga County, Michigan
  - coordinates: 46.5866°N 88.2681°W
- Mouth
  - location: Portage Lake, Michigan
  - coordinates: 47.0349°N 88.4884°W
- Length: 105 mi (169 km)

National Wild and Scenic River
- Type: Wild, Scenic
- Designated: March 3, 1992

The Sturgeon River is a 105-mile-long (169 km) river in Baraga and Houghton counties in the U.S. state of Michigan. 25.0 miles (40.2 km) of the river were added to the National Wild and Scenic Rivers System in 1992.

== Description ==
The Sturgeon River rises on the glacially-eroded plateau that forms much of southern Baraga County. Flowing westward through the Copper Country State Forest, it enters the Ottawa National Forest north of Watton. The 25.0-mile (40.2 km) length of the river's course in this national forest has been listed as a wild and scenic river, with 16.5 miles (26.6 km) designated as wild and 8.5 miles (13.7 km) as scenic. On this stretch, which crosses and recrosses the border between Baraga County and Houghton County, the river helps to form the Sturgeon River Gorge Wilderness and flows over Sturgeon Falls.

After leaving the Ottawa National Forest west of Baraga, Sturgeon River flows northward, again crossing and recrossing the Baraga–Houghton County line. It then is dammed up to create the 810-acre (330 ha) Prickett Lake. Flowing from there, it moves generally parallel to the western shore of Keweenaw Bay. The river discharges into Portage Lake near Chassell, Michigan.

The Wild and Scenic portion of the Sturgeon River, within the Ottawa National Forest, is classified as a Blue Ribbon Trout Stream.
