= Saint Henry's Evangelical Lutheran Church and Cemetery =

Historic church in Michigan, United States

- U.S. National Register of Historic Places
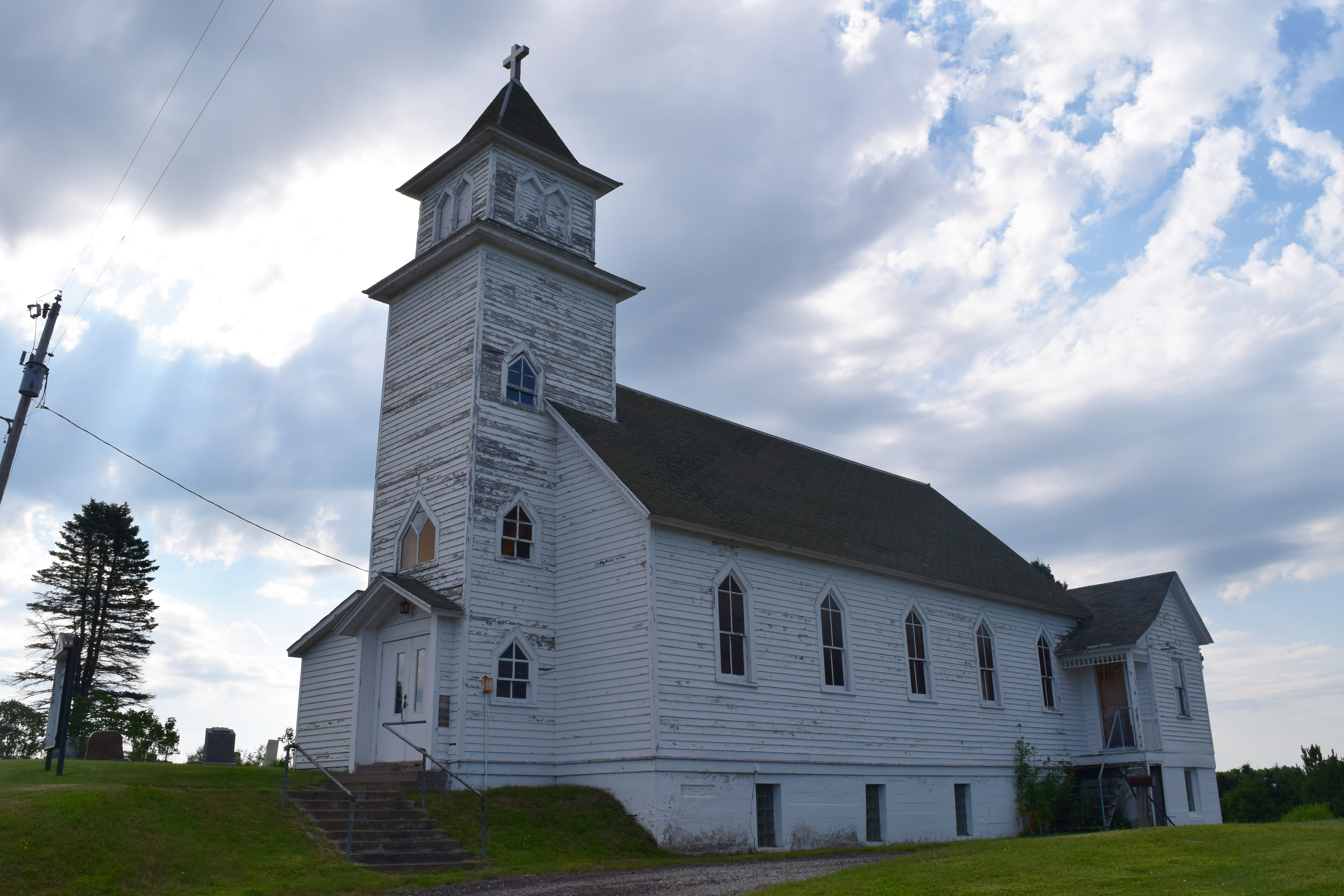

- Location within Michigan Location within the United States
- Interactive map
- Location: M-38 in Laird Township, Michigan
- Nearest city: Nisula, Michigan
- Coordinates: 46°45′53″N 88°47′3″W
- Area: 9.25 acres (3.74 ha)
- Built: 1904
- NRHP reference No.: 13000665
- Added to NRHP: September 4, 2013

Saint Henry's Evangelical Lutheran Church and Cemetery is a church located on M-38 in Laird Township near Nisula. It was listed on the National Register of Historic Places in 2013.

== History ==
In 1894, a group of Finnish settlers arrived in the area that is now around the hamlets of Nisula and Alston. They established a Lutheran congregation immediately, and purchased the property where this church and cemetery now stand. A small log church, measuring 16 feet (4.9 m) by 20 feet (6.1 m), was built and consecrated in May 1895. In 1904, the church was completely reconstructed to build the structure that is in place today. In 1913, the chancel was added, and in 1925 the vestibule and steeple were remodeled. Later, likely in 1931, a concrete basement was built beneath the church.

The church functioned as an independent congregation until 1908, when it joined the church at nearby Mass City. In 1925, the Nisula church joined those at Pelkie and Elo to form a single parish. That same year saw the peak in membership, with 485 people in the congregation. Lumbering and agriculture in the area slowly declined, and by 1955, membership had dropped to 162 people, and in 1983 to 112. In 1989, the three churches at Nisula, Pelkie, and Elo voted to combine, holding services at the Pelkie church. The last service at Nisula was in 1992. Laird Township assumed ownership of the church, preserving it as a historical attraction. The associated cemetery is still in use.

== Description ==
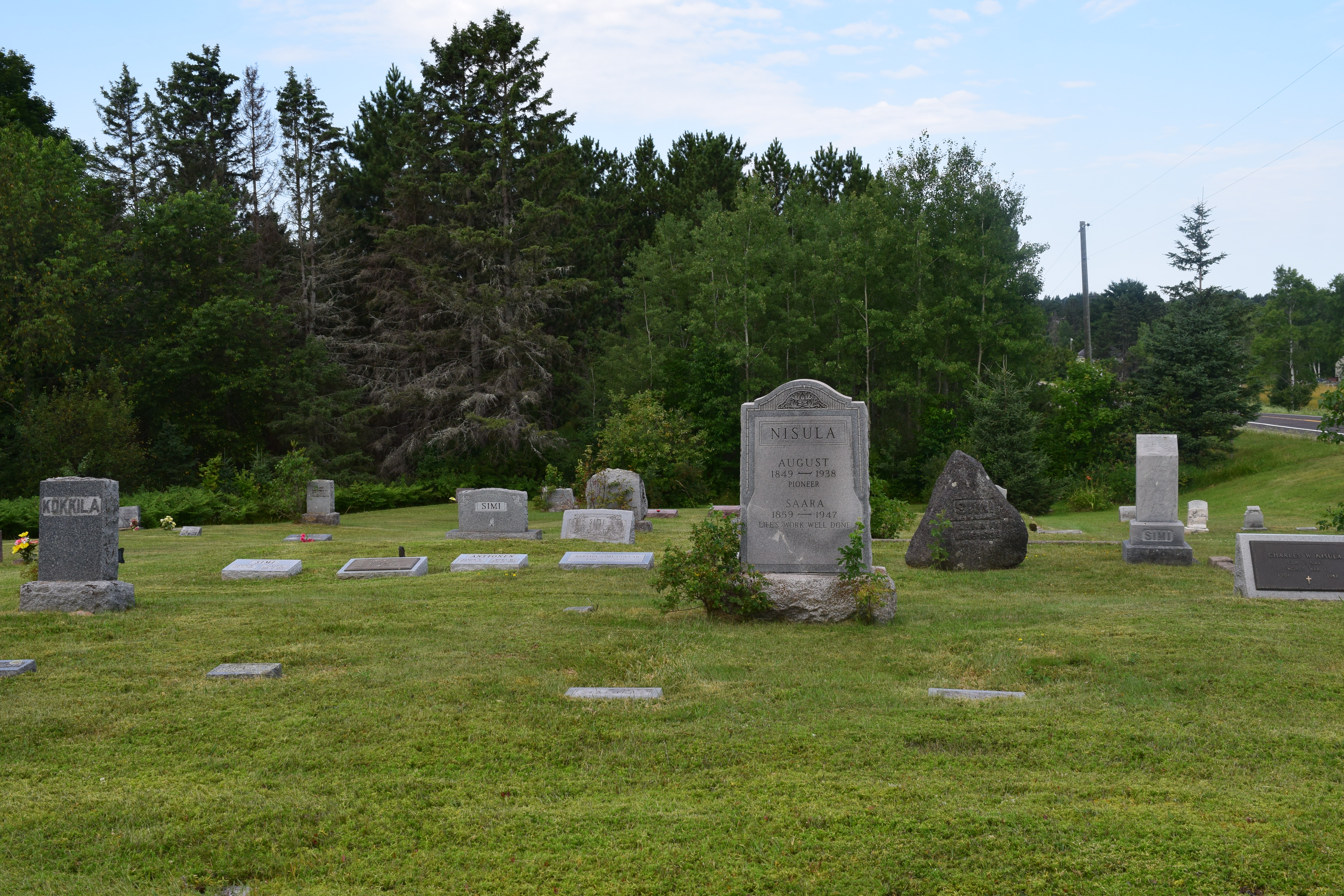
The church's cemetery

Saint Henry's Evangelical Lutheran Church is a white rectangular structure on a concrete foundation, clad in clapboards and having a steep gable roof. To the rear is a hipped roof chancel with a round end, with a sacristy projecting from it. A square tower with pyramid-roofed belfry projects from the front façade, containing double entry doors sheltered under a projecting gable. A vestibule near the front doors lies under a shed roof addition.

Through the vestibule is the rectangular nave, with a smooth plaster arched ceiling. A broad archway leads to the chancel. A small staircase lead downward to the social hall and kitchen on the basement level.

The church is flanked on both sides by the cemetery. Cemetery plots are arranged in rows, with primarily granite, and some marble, monuments. One grave is marked with a large boulder.
