= Baraga =

Baraga may refer to:

== Places ==
- Baraga Correctional Facility, a Michigan state prison in Baraga village, Michigan
- Baraga County, Michigan
- Baraga Township, Michigan
- Baraga, Michigan

== Surname ==
- Antonija Baraga
- Bishop Frederic Baraga

== See also ==
- Baragar
