= Forest Highway 16 =

County road and forest highway in Michigan, United States

Federal Forest Highway 16
- FFH-16 highlighted in red

Route information
- Maintained by ICRC, HCRC, OCRC, and USFS
- Length: 50.504 mi (Note: The MDOT map shows FFH-16 continuing south along Smokey Lake Road to the state line, but the MDOT Physical Reference Finder Application indicates that FFH-16 terminates at Smokey Lake Road.) (81.278 km)
- History: Marked on maps in 1983 as "H-16"

Major junctions
- South end: CR 436 in Stambaugh Township
- US 2 in Stambaugh Township: M-28 in Kenton
- North end: M-38 near Nisula

Location
- Country: United States
- State: Michigan
- Counties: Iron, Houghton, Ontonagon

Highway system
- Forest Highway System; Michigan State Trunkline Highway System; Interstate; US; State; Byways
← H-15	→ H-33

Federal Forest Highway 16 (FFH 16) is a forest highway in the western Upper Peninsula of the US state of Michigan that runs through the Ottawa National Forest in Iron, Houghton and Ontonagon counties. The Michigan Department of Transportation (MDOT) has erroneously marked it as H-16 on their official state map. FFH 16 is designated by the US Forest Service (USFS) with maintenance shared by the county road commissions (ICRC, HCRC, OCRC, respectively). Although the MDOT maps would suggest that it is a part of the County-Designated Highway System (CDH system), it is not. The three counties in question do not participate in the system, and the roadway falls in the middle of the G zone for numbering purposes.

== Route description ==
FFH 16 starts at an intersection with County Road 436 (CR 436, Smokey Lake Road) near Horseshoe Lake in rural Iron County's Stambaugh Township. The roadway runs north from this location east of Smokey Lake through forest lands that are part of the Ottawa National Forest. Near Golden Lake and the Golden Lake National Forest Campground, FFH 16 and US Highway 2 (US 2) intersect. FFH 16 continues north and curves to the northwest around the end of Golden Lake. The routing of the road provides access to several more lakes in rural Iron County such as Paint, Silk and Hehe lakes, as well as an older routing of US 2, before crossing into southern Houghton County.

In Houghton County, FFH 16 and M-28 meet in the Duncan Township community of Kenton. The former roadway turns east and runs concurrently along the latter one for approximately a quarter mile (0.4 km) before turning northward again, leaving town near the cemetery. The forest highway tracks due north until Bob Lake. There the roadway meanders through the area near another National Forest campground and crosses into eastern Ontonagon County. FFH 16 crosses back into Houghton County one last time. Immediately after crossing the county line, the forest highway terminates at an intersection with M-38 west of the community of Nisula.

== History ==
A new county-designated highway appeared on maps for the first time in 1983, H-16; it was marked as running between US 2 and M-28 only. This designation was removed in the 1985 edition of the map. The H-16 label reappeared in 1992; this time it was shown continuing south toward the Wisconsin state line and north to M-38, along the routing of FFH-16. The roadway is part of the Forest Highway System that is funded and administered by the US Forest Service and the Federal Highway Administration; the system was created by the Federal Aid Highway Act of 1921. The highway has never been included in the CDH system as Iron, Houghton and Ontonagon counties do not participate in the system, and the Upper Peninsula east of US 41 is the G zone, not the H zone.

== Major intersections ==
County	Location	mi	km	Destinations	Notes
Iron	Stambaugh Township	0.000	0.000	CR 436 (Smokey Lake Road)	Southern terminus; Smokey Lake Road continues to Wisconsin Highway 17 at state line
Iron	Stambaugh Township	5.424	8.729	US 2 – Ironwood, Iron River	
Houghton	Kenton	30.074– 30.276	48.399– 48.724	M-28 – Wakefield, Marquette	FFH-16 travels concurrently with M-28
Ontonagon	No major junctions				
Houghton	Nisula	50.504	81.278	M-38 – Ontonagon, Baraga	Northern terminus off the Ontonagon–Houghton county line
1.000 mi = 1.609 km; 1.000 km = 0.621 mi: Concurrency terminus
