= Herman and Anna Hanka Farm =

- Hanka Homestead
- U.S. National Register of Historic Places
- U.S. Historic district
- Michigan State Historic Site
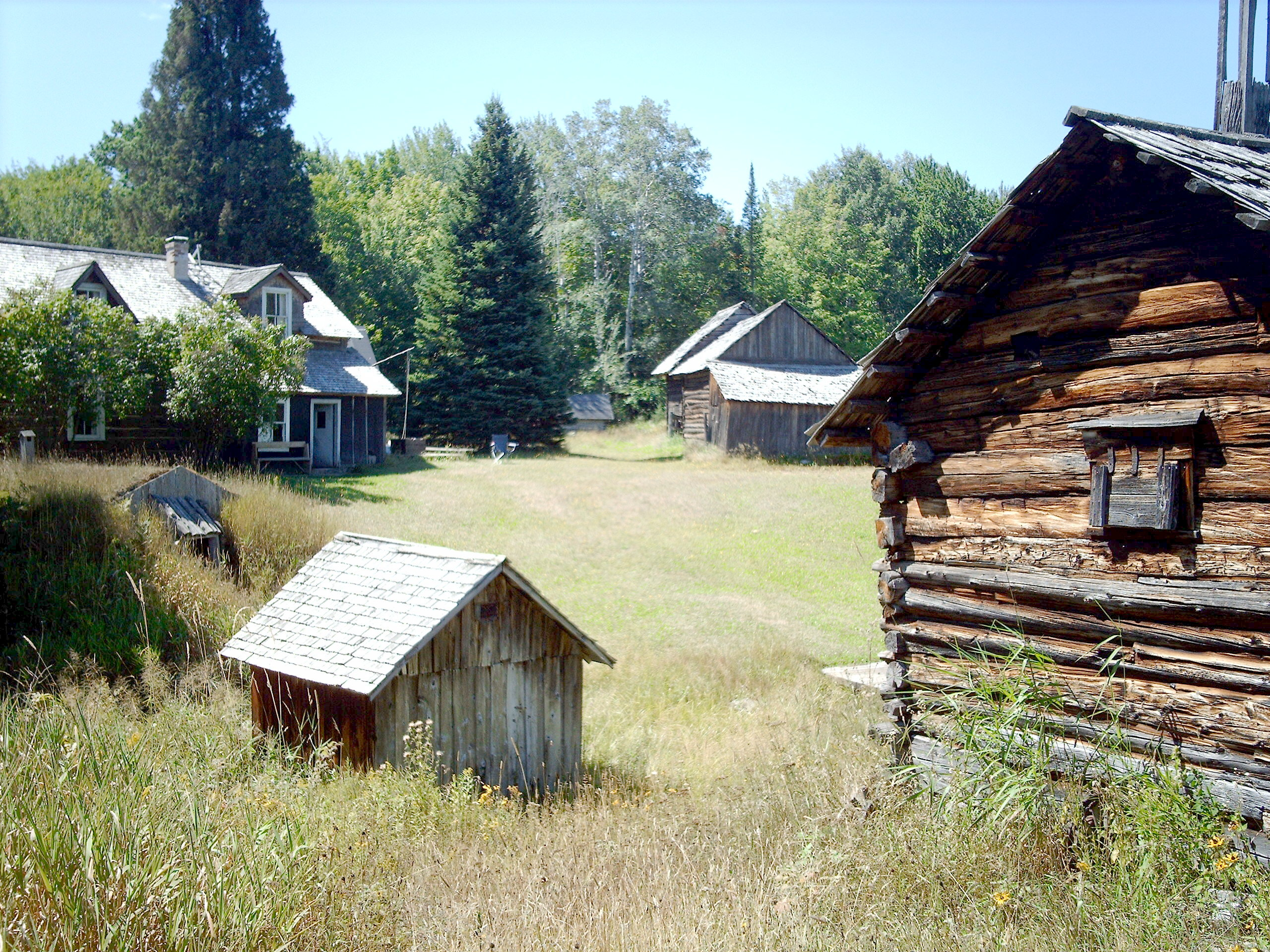

- Location within Michigan Location within the United States
- Interactive map
- Location: Baraga Township, Baraga County, Michigan, US
- Nearest city: Pelkie, Michigan
- Coordinates: 46°53′37″N 88°32′17″W
- Area: 40 acres (16 ha)
- Built: 1896
- NRHP reference No.: 84001372
- Added to NRHP: July 19, 1984

The Hanka Homestead now known as the Hanka Homestead Finnish Museum is a group of eight buildings on a 40-acre (16 ha) homestead. It is located three miles (4.8 km) west of U.S. Highway 41, off Tower Road, near Pelkie, Michigan, in the United States. The homestead was added to the National Register of Historic Places in 1984.

== History and significance ==
The Hanka Homestead was occupied by members of the Hanka family, Finnish immigrants, from 1896 until 1966. The farm was originally homesteaded at a time of mass immigration from Finland to the United States, as well as a migration from the mining locations in the Upper Peninsula to more rural locations. The homestead is relatively intact and unaltered from its appearance in the 1920s. It is significant because it represents an agricultural way of life in the late 19th century, and the transfer of a northern European Finnish folk-architectural tradition to the American frontier.

The farm has been restored to its appearance in the 1920s and is open to visitors. The farm is staffed from Memorial Day through Labor Day on Tuesdays, Thursdays, Saturdays and Sundays from noon to 4pm; at other times self-guided tours are available.

== Description ==
The Hanka farm covers 40 acres (16 ha) and included 11 buildings in the 1920s as well a related landscape features. The buildings are constructed of hewn logs, built by members of the Hanka family. The buildings included a farmhouse, hay barn, and sauna, all from c. 1896, and well as a woodshed, outhouse, horse barn (c. 1914), root cellar (c. 1902), indrive—no longer remains (c. 1902), blacksmith shop, cattle barn (1910), and milkhouse. The farmhouse includes a later addition from before 1915.
