= H16 =

H16 or H-16 may refer to:

== Transport ==
- Curtiss H-16, a 1914 American Curtiss Model H flying boat variant
- H16 engine, a type of H engine like the Fairey H-16
- HMS Daring (H16), a 1932 British Royal Navy D-class destroyer
- HMS Foxhound (H16), a 1909 British Royal Navy Beagle-class destroyer
- HMS H16, a World War I British Royal Navy H-class submarine
- LSWR H16 class, a British LSWR locomotive
- Piasecki H-16 Transporter, a tandem-rotor helicopter

== Other uses ==
- H16, a type of heath community in the British National Vegetation Classification
- H16, a Slovak rap group named after the former Hálova 16 elementary school, Majk Spirit is one of their members
- H-16 County Highway, an alternative name for Forest Highway 16
- Keratitis, by ICD-10 code
