= M-38 (Michigan highway) =

State highway in Michigan, United States

M-38
- M-38 highlighted in red

Route information
- Maintained by MDOT
- Length: 42.225 mi (67.955 km)
- Existed: January 1968–present
- Tourist routes: Lake Superior Circle Tour

Major junctions
- West end: US 45 / M-64 in Ontonagon
- M-26 in Greenland
- East end: US 41 in Baraga

Location
- Country: United States
- State: Michigan
- Counties: Ontonagon, Houghton, Baraga

Highway system
- Michigan State Trunkline Highway System; Interstate; US; State; Byways
← M-37	→ M-39

M-38 is an east–west state trunkline highway in the Upper Peninsula (UP) of the U.S. state of Michigan. Its west end starts in Ontonagon and runs east to Baraga, some 42.225 miles (67.955 km) apart. The highway crosses streams and rivers in forest lands and provides access to a casino. The east end is located by the Keweenaw Bay of Lake Superior in the Keweenaw Bay Indian Community.

There have been two highways in the state to carry the designation. The first was located in the southeastern Lower Peninsula. The current version of M-38 was created from a section of M-35 in the 1960s. This section was orphaned from the rest of M-35 when the highway was cancelled through the Huron Mountains.

== Route description ==
M-38 begins at a four-way intersection in Ontonagon. US Highway 45 (US 45) runs north–south through this intersection while M-64 runs west and M-38 runs east on Steel Street. This intersection is both the eastern terminus of M-64 and the western terminus of M-38. From here, M-38 forms a segment of the Lake Superior Circle Tour along Ontonagon–Greenland Road to a junction with M-26 near Greenland. The roadway runs through forest land and crosses several small streams while traveling southeasterly. Outside of Greenland, M-38 curves north around town after intersecting Plank Road. On the east side of town, M-26 and M-38 meet and join in a concurrency after Ontonagon–Greenland Road meets Plank Road a second time. The two highways run together for just over a mile to the unincorporated community of Lake Mine. There, M-38 turns south through the community while M-26 turns off to the northeast.

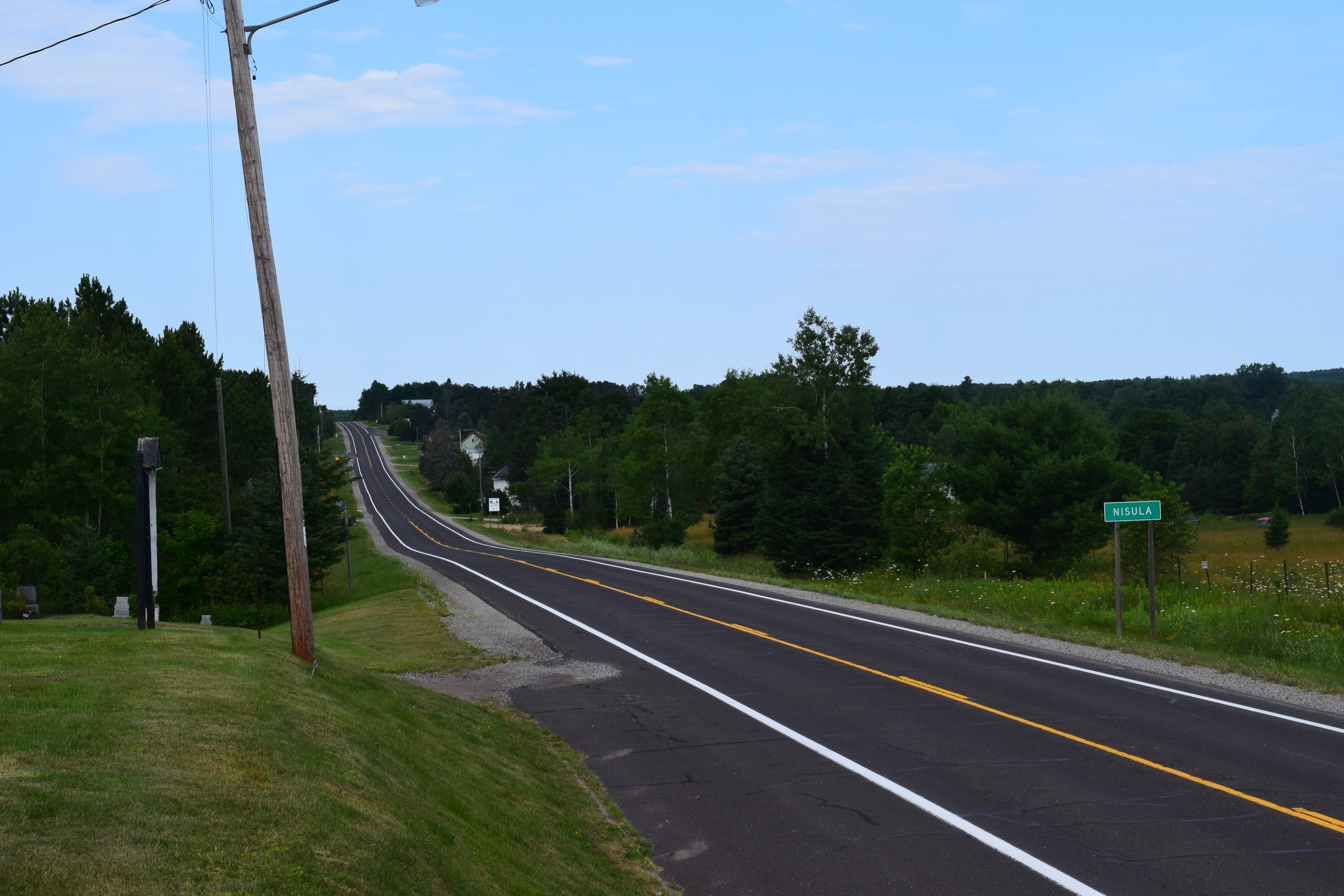
M-38 in Nisula

The highway crosses a set of railroad tracks before turning east. At Post Office Road, M-38 meets Old M-35 Road, a vestige of a highway straightening project during the time the highway was M-35. M-38 crosses the West Branch of the Firesteel River in hilly terrain through this area. The highway continues east and provides access to the Courtney Lake National Forest Campground west of the Houghton County line. East of Federal Forest Highway 16 (FFH-16) near Nisula, M-38 crosses the West Branch of the Otter River. Along this section of roadway in Houghton County, the lowest annual average daily traffic (AADT) counts were measured by the Michigan Department of Transportation (MDOT) in 2007. An average of 680 vehicles traveled on the roadway, according to MDOT surveys. Of those vehicles, only 40 trucks on average were included in the traffic counts. East of Nisula, the roadway runs parallel to Mill Creek. Mill Creek flows into the West Branch of the Sturgeon River near the Baraga County line.

East of the county line is the crossing over the Sturgeon River south of Pelkie, home of the Baraga County Fairgrounds. The trunkline crosses more hilly terrain while veering to the northeast. Continuing to the east, M-38 had its highest traffic usage in 2007. The AADT for the Baraga County highway segment was measured at 3,000 vehicles a day. The roadway continues east through Baraga County and runs downhill approaching Baraga and the Keweenaw Bay Indian Community, home of the first Native American casino in the United States. After passing through downtown Baraga on Michigan Avenue, M-38 ends at an intersection with US 41; on the western shore of Keweenaw Bay.

== History ==
=== Previous designation ===
The first version of M-38 was designated in 1919 in the Lower Peninsula. It was located on Junction Road from M-10 (later US 10/US 23) southeast of Bridgeport to Frankenmuth, and then ran east to M-19 in the Peck area in 1919. The highway was transferred to county jurisdiction in late 1961 when Interstate 75 (I-75) was completed in the area.

=== Current designation ===
In January 1969, the Michigan Department of State Highways redesignated the western section of M-35 as M-38. M-35 was originally planned to start in Menominee and run north to Big Bay, turn west through the Huron Mountains in northern Marquette County and run west from Baraga to Ontonagon. The Huron Mountains portion of M-35 was never built due to opposition from Henry Ford and the Huron Mountain Club. This left M-35 discontinuous. It was later routed along US 41 from Negaunee to Baraga, connecting the two sections until the western section was given the M-38 designation.

The original routing of M-38 in the Upper Peninsula ran from M-26 at Greenland to Baraga. US 45 was rerouted in 1971 along M-26 from Rockland to Greenland and Ontonagon–Greenland Road between those two towns. M-26 was shortened to end at the new US 45 in Greenland. This change to US 45 was reversed in 1973. M-26 was re-extended to Rockland, and M-38 was extended along M-26 to Ontonagon–Greenland Road to meet US 45 in Ontonagon.

On October 11, 2006, the western terminus of M-38 was relocated about 0.25 miles (0.40 km) south to end at a junction with US 45 and the newly realigned M-64.

== Major intersections ==
County	Location	mi	km	Destinations	Notes
Ontonagon	Ontonagon	0.000	0.000	US 45 – Rockland M-64 south / LSCT west – Silver City	West end of LSCT concurrency
Ontonagon	Greenland	13.305	21.412	M-26 south – Bruce Crossing	Western end of M-26 concurrency
Ontonagon	Greenland	14.438	23.236	M-26 north / LSCT east – Houghton	Eastern end of M-26 and LSCT concurrencies
Houghton	Laird Township	21.611	34.780	FFH 16 south	Marked as H-16 on MDOT maps
Baraga	Baraga	42.225	67.955	US 41 / LSCT – Houghton, L'Anse, Marquette	
1.000 mi = 1.609 km; 1.000 km = 0.621 mi: Concurrency terminus
