= Baragar =

Baragar is a surname. Notable people with the surname include:

- Caleb Baragar (born 1994), American baseball pitcher
- Fletcher Baragar (born 1955), Canadian chess player

== See also ==
- Baraga (disambiguation)
