= Laird Township, Michigan =

- Civil township
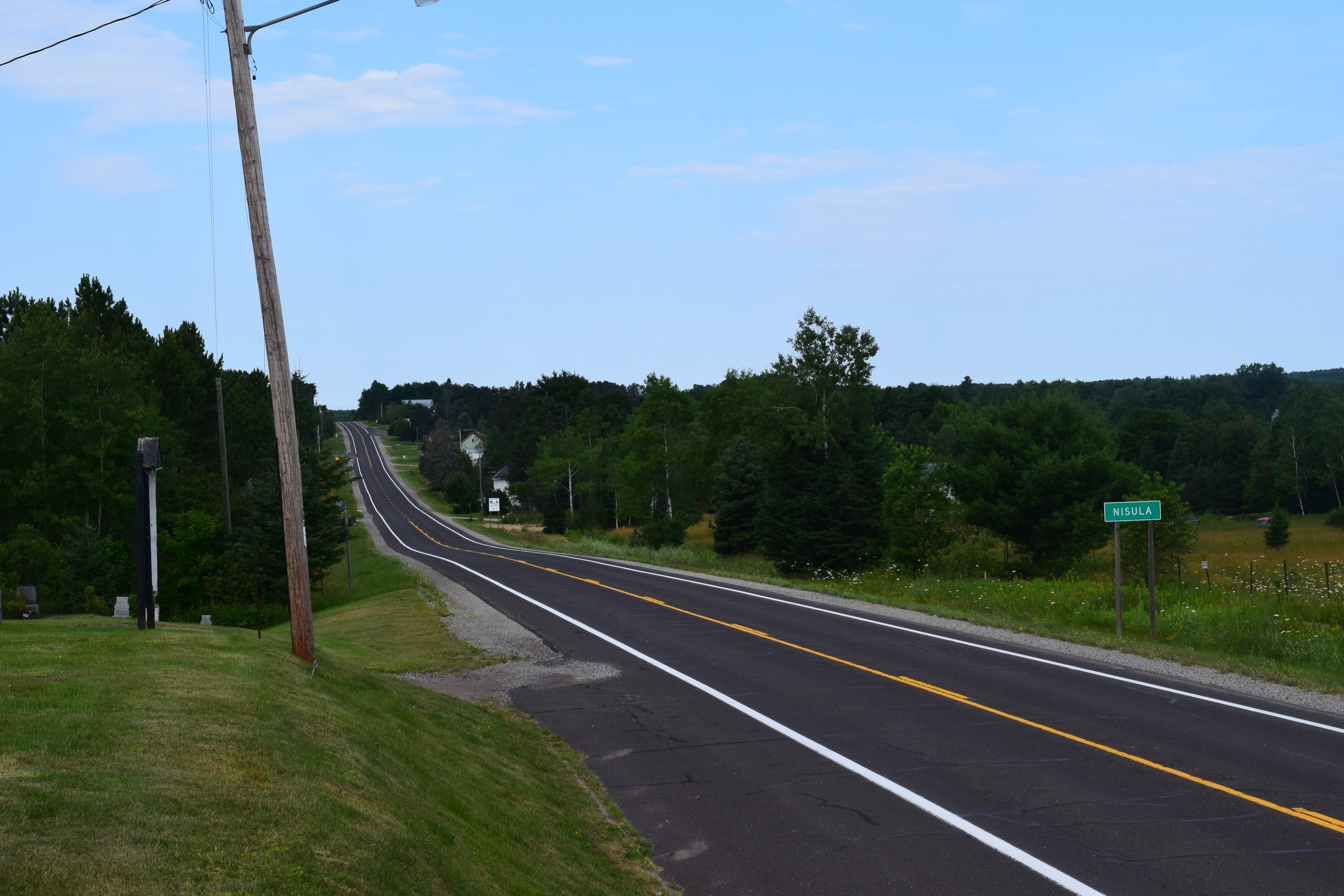
- Community of Nisula along M-38

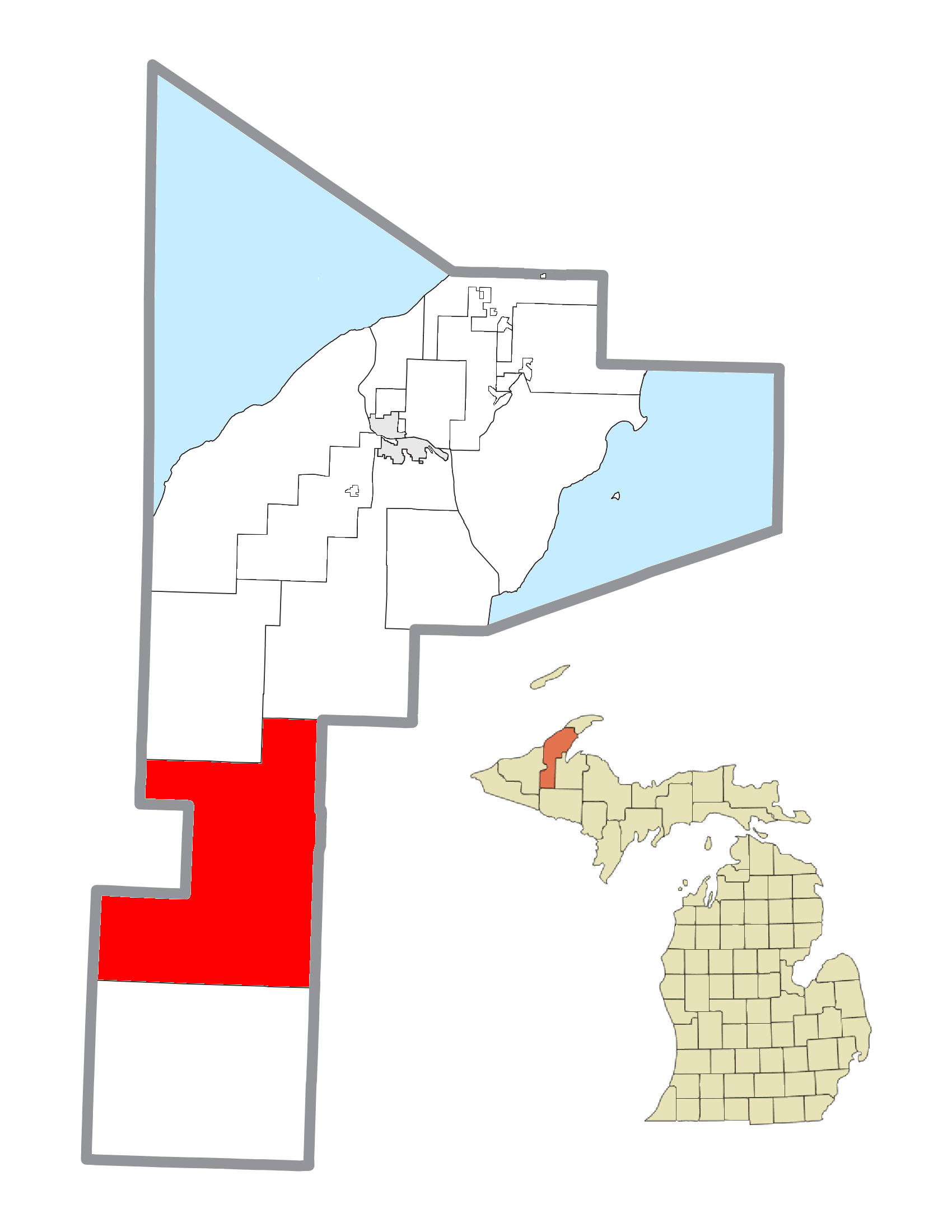
- Location within Houghton County

- Location within the state of Michigan Laird Township (the United States)
- Coordinates: 46°42′41″N 88°47′55″W
- Country: United States
- State: Michigan
- County: Houghton

Government
  - Supervisor: Patrick McLaren

Area
  - Total: 189.4 sq mi (490.5 km^{2})
  - Land: 188.1 sq mi (487.1 km^{2})
  - Water: 1.3 sq mi (3.4 km^{2})
- Elevation: 1,030 ft (314 m)

Population (2020)
  - Total: 487
  - Density: 2.59/sq mi (1.00/km^{2})
- Time zone: UTC-5 (Eastern (EST))
  - Summer (DST): UTC-4 (EDT)
- ZIP code(s): 49952 (Nisula); 49958 (Pelkie); 49961 (Sidnaw); 49965 (Toivola); 49967 (Trout Creek)
- Area code: 906
- FIPS code: 26-44220
- GNIS feature ID: 1626571
- Website: https://lairdtownship.org/

Laird Township is a civil township of Houghton County in the U.S. state of Michigan. The population was 487 at the 2020 census.

== Communities ==
- Alston is an unincorporated community in the township at 46°46′06″N 88°45′11″W. It began with a rural post office named Laird in August 1887. The office was closed in October 1888 but was restored in November 1888. When J.V. Alston became postmaster in April 1902, the community and post office were renamed for him. The office continued to operate until June 1957.
- Bishop is an unincorporated community in the township.
- Motley is an unincorporated community in the township.
- Nisula is an unincorporated community in the township.
- Pori, also sometimes called "Plato," is an unincorporated community in the township.

== Geography ==
According to the United States Census Bureau, the township has a total area of 189.4 square miles (491 km^{2}), of which 188.1 square miles (487 km^{2}) is land and 1.3 square miles (3.4 km^{2}) (0.69%) is water.

== Demographics ==
As of the census of 2000, there were 634 people, 253 households, and 170 families residing in the township. The population density was 3.4 inhabitants per square mile (1.3/km^{2}). There were 436 housing units at an average density of 2.3 per square mile (0.89/km^{2}). The racial makeup of the township was 94.48% White, 2.52% Native American, 0.79% Asian, and 2.21% from two or more races. Hispanic or Latino of any race were 0.16% of the population. 60.1% were of Finnish, 13.7% German and 5.3% French ancestry according to Census 2000.

There were 253 households, out of which 28.5% had children under the age of 18 living with them, 58.9% were married couples living together, 4.3% had a female householder with no husband present, and 32.8% were non-families. 29.2% of all households were made up of individuals, and 9.9% had someone living alone who was 65 years of age or older. The average household size was 2.49 and the average family size was 3.12.

In the township the population was spread out, with 25.9% under the age of 18, 9.6% from 18 to 24, 24.9% from 25 to 44, 25.4% from 45 to 64, and 14.2% who were 65 years of age or older. The median age was 38 years. For every 100 females, there were 121.7 males. For every 100 females age 18 and over, there were 118.6 males.

The median income for a household in the township was $33,333, and the median income for a family was $38,750. Males had a median income of $29,659 versus $20,000 for females. The per capita income for the township was $14,728. About 3.6% of families and 8.5% of the population were below the poverty line, including 10.6% of those under age 18 and 7.6% of those age 65 or over.
