= Reindeer Games =

2000 film by John Frankenheimer

- Theatrical release poster
- Directed by: John Frankenheimer
- Written by: Ehren Kruger
- Produced by: Marty Katz; Bob Weinstein; Chris Moore
- Starring: Ben Affleck; Gary Sinise; Charlize Theron
- Cinematography: Alan Caso
- Edited by: Antony Gibbs; Michael Kahn
- Music by: Alan Silvestri
- Production company: Dimension Films
- Distributed by: Miramax Films
- Release date: February 25, 2000
- Running time: 104 minutes
- Country: United States
- Language: English
- Budget: $42 million
- Box office: $32.2 million

Reindeer Games (also released under the title Deception) is a 2000 American action thriller film directed by John Frankenheimer, written by Ehren Kruger, and starring Ben Affleck, Gary Sinise and Charlize Theron. The plot centers on an ex-convict (Affleck) who assumes his deceased cellmate's identity and becomes entangled in a heist targeting a casino in Michigan's Upper Peninsula.

Produced by Dimension Films and released theatrically by Miramax Films on February 25, 2000, the film received negative reviews from critics and emerged as a box-office bomb, grossing $32.2 million worldwide against a $42 million budget. This was Frankenheimer's final feature before his death in 2002.

== Plot ==
In a prison near Iron Mountain, Michigan, cellmates Nick Cassidy and Rudy Duncan are two days from release. Nick has been exchanging letters with a young woman named Ashley Mercer, although they have never met. He plans to meet Ashley after being released, while Rudy wants to join his family in Sidnaw for Christmas. A fight then breaks out in the prison, and Nick is killed while protecting Rudy. Upon release, Rudy poses as Nick and meets Ashley. They go to a diner, then have sex in a cabin.

The two are then kidnapped by Gabriel, Ashley's gang leader brother. He tells Rudy that the gang, composed of Pug, Merlin, and Jumpy, are planning to rob a casino where Nick used to work before going to prison. Rudy protests that he is not Nick, but Ashley reveals that she wrote to him knowing Gabriel would use him for the robbery. Realizing that he will likely be killed if they learn that he knows nothing about the casino, Rudy resumes the ruse.

Rudy devises a robbery plan based on Nick's prison cell stories, and tells Gabriel the biggest loot is in the "PowWow safe" in manager Jack Bangs's office. Gabriel wants Rudy to draw a map of the casino, but Rudy claims that the casino has been remodeled. At the casino Rudy, dressed as a cowboy, snoops around to see any changes, and is almost caught by Jack Bangs but escapes by switching clothes with a college student.

Merlin discovers that the casino was never remodeled and has been the same since it opened. Rudy runs with Ashley to a frozen lake pursued by Gabriel and his thugs shooting at them. Ashley falls through the ice and Rudy jumps in to rescue her. The thugs pull them out and are seen by an ice fisherman, whom Gabriel kills.

Gabriel throws darts at Rudy to get answers and rants about his life as a truck driver. He decides to give him a second chance at drawing the map. Later, Rudy stumbles upon Gabriel and Ashley in the pool area and learns they are not siblings, but lovers. The casino robbery does not go according to plan due to the inaccurate details of Rudy's map. Pug is killed in the count room.

Everyone meets in the manager's office. Gabriel introduces Rudy to Jack as Nick, but the manager recognizes him only as the cowboy from earlier and not as Nick. Gabriel, furious at Rudy's deception, spares him for a moment when he demands to know where the "PowWow" safe is. When Jack opens the safe, he grabs guns from inside and kills Jumpy as the rest flee. Jack dies during the shootout while Rudy kills Merlin. Rudy is grabbed out the back door by Gabriel and Ashley, who tie him up in their 18-wheeler truck.

The two plan to drive Rudy off the cliff in a burning car with some of the money, so it will be assumed the stolen money had been burned. Ashley shoots and kills Gabriel, then Nick appears, having faked his death. Ashley's real name is revealed to be Millie Bobeck, and she was aware of Rudy's identity the whole time. Millie and Nick had collaborated to rob the casino using Rudy, Gabriel, and the gang. They tie Rudy to the steering wheel. Using a knife he had gotten earlier, Rudy cuts his bindings, hot wires the car, and reverses it, crushing Nick's legs. Millie desperately tries to shoot him but Rudy rams the burning car into her. He dives out as the car and Millie go over the cliff. Nick tries to persuade Rudy to share the money, but Rudy locks him in the truck and sends it over the cliff.

Rudy picks up the cash and begins distributing it in mailboxes on the way home to Sidnaw, where he joins his family for Christmas dinner, admitting to himself that he was never one for the holidays until now.

== Cast ==
- Ben Affleck as Rudy Duncan
- Charlize Theron as Ashley Mercer / Millie Bobeck
- Gary Sinise as Gabriel 'Monster' Mercer
- Dennis Farina as Jack Bangs
- James Frain as Nick Cassidy
- Clarence Williams III as 'Merlin'
- Donal Logue as 'Pug'
- Danny Trejo as 'Jumpy'
- Isaac Hayes as 'Zook'
- Dana Stubblefield as 'The Alamo'
- Gordon Tootoosis as Old Governor
- Lonny Chapman as Old Timer

The film features brief appearances by Ashton Kutcher, who was then starring in the sitcom That '70s Show, as a college student, and adult film actor Ron Jeremy—credited under his real name, Ron Hyatt—as a prison inmate.

== Production ==
=== Casting ===
Vin Diesel was initially cast in the role of Pug but departed the project due to creative disagreements with director John Frankenheimer regarding the script and the development of his character. Diesel later co-starred with Ben Affleck in the 2000 film Boiler Room.

=== Filming ===
Although the story is set in the Upper Peninsula of Michigan, principal photography took place in Vancouver and Prince George, British Columbia, Canada. Filming began on March 15, 1999.

== Release ==
=== Theatrical ===
The film was screened for test audiences who gave it a mixed response. As a result, several scenes were re-shot and the film underwent additional editing. Its release date was postponed from Christmas 1999 to February 2000.

=== Home media ===
The theatrical cut of the film was released on DVD in the United States on August 8, 2000, and included an audio commentary by director John Frankenheimer. An extended director's cut, running 124 mins, was released on DVD in the United States on March 27, 2001, including a new second audio commentary by Frankenheimer and additional deleted and alternate scenes. There was reportedly a much more explicit version of the sex scene between Ashley and Rudy that was different from the one included in the unrated cut; in the director's commentary, John Frankenheimer explained that he decided to cut it from the theatrical version due to the possibility of receiving an NC-17 rating by the MPAA.

Dimension Films was sold by The Walt Disney Company in 2005, with its parent label Miramax then being sold by Disney in 2010. That same year, private equity firm Filmyard Holdings took control of Miramax and the pre-October 2005 library of Dimension. Filmyard licensed the home media rights for several Dimension/Miramax titles to Lionsgate, and Lionsgate Home Entertainment released the director's cut on Blu-Ray on March 6, 2012.

In March 2016, Filmyard Holdings sold Miramax and the pre-October 2005 Dimension library to Qatari company beIN Media Group. Then in April 2020, ViacomCBS (now known as Paramount Skydance) bought a 49% stake in Miramax, which gave them the rights to the Miramax library and the pre-October 2005 Dimension library. Reindeer Games is among the 700 titles they acquired in the deal, and since April 2020, the film has been distributed by Paramount Pictures. On July 27, 2021, Paramount Home Entertainment reissued the director's cut on Blu-ray, with this being one of many Dimension/Miramax titles that they reissued around this time. Paramount later licensed the film to Kino Lorber, who released it on a 4K Ultra HD Blu-ray on January 14, 2025.

On March 4, 2021, Reindeer Games was made available on Paramount's then-new streaming service Paramount+, as one of its inaugural launch titles. Paramount also included it on their free streaming service Pluto TV.

== Reception ==
=== Box office ===
Reindeer Games was produced on a budget of approximately $42 million and grossed $32.2 million worldwide, falling short of recouping its production costs.

=== Critical response ===
On the review aggregator website Rotten Tomatoes, Reindeer Games holds an approval rating of 25% based on 92 reviews, with an average rating of 4.2/10. The site's critical consensus reads: "Despite a decent cast, subpar acting and a contrived plot disappointed reviewers." On Metacritic, the film has a weighted average score of 37 out of 100, based on 33 critics, indicating "generally unfavorable reviews". Audiences polled by CinemaScore gave the film an average grade of "C−" on an A+ to F scale. A review from CNN commented that "Reindeer Games isn't at the bottom of his [Frankenheimer's] creative barrel, but it's close."

== See also ==
- List of Christmas films
