= Baraga State Park =

Park in Michigan, USA

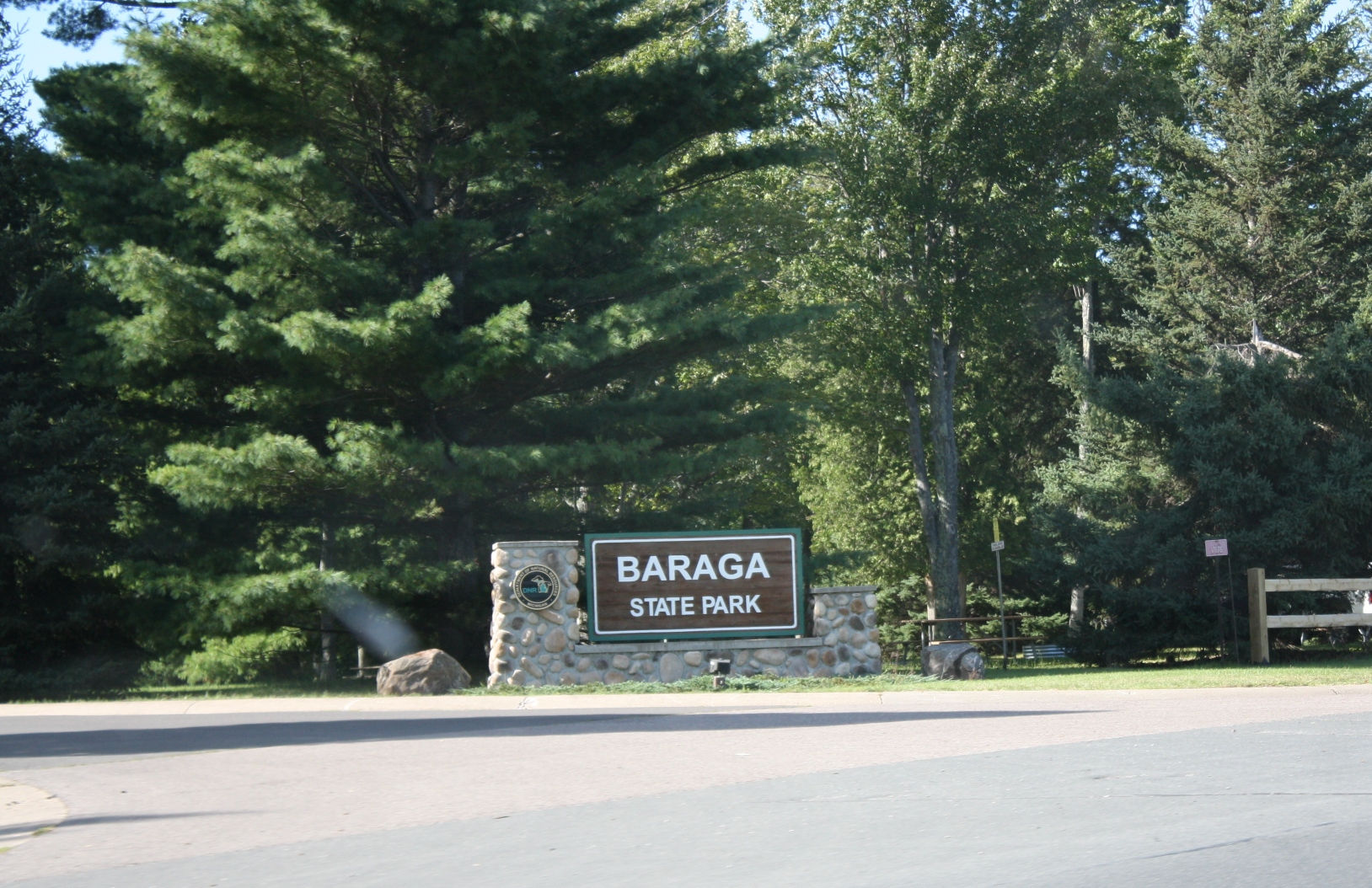
- Entrance sign

- Location within Michigan Location within the United States
- Location: Baraga Township, Baraga County, Michigan
- Nearest city: Baraga, Michigan
- Coordinates: 46°45′39″N 88°30′03″W
- Area: 56 acres (22.7 ha)
- Elevation: 614 feet (187 m)
- Established: 1922
- Administrator: Michigan Department of Natural Resources
- Designation: Michigan State Park
- Website: Official website

Baraga State Park is a public recreation area covering 56 acres (23 ha) on the shore of Lake Superior's Keweenaw Bay in Baraga County, Michigan. The state park sits along Route 41 on the south side of the village of Baraga. The park, village, and county bear the name of Bishop Frederic Baraga.

== History ==
After making its initial land purchase in 1922, the state began developing the park in 1924. Further improvements and enlargement were undertaken under the aegis of the Works Progress Administration in the 1930s.

In 2024, the Michigan Department of Natural Resources, the Copper Shores Community Health Foundation, and a private donor funded the construction of a playground.

== Activities and amenities ==
The park offers swimming, fishing, paddling, picnicking facilities, camping, nature trail, ungroomed cross-country skiing, snowmobiling, playground, and metal detecting.
