= Sidnaw, Michigan =

- Unincorporated community
- Location within Michigan Location within the United States
- Coordinates: 46°30′17″N 88°42′30″W
- Country: United States
- State: Michigan
- County: Houghton
- Township: Duncan
- Elevation: 1,368 ft (417 m)
- Time zone: UTC-5 (Eastern (EST))
  - Summer (DST): UTC-4 (EDT)
- ZIP code(s): 49961
- Area code: 906
- GNIS feature ID: 1621597

Sidnaw is an unincorporated community in southern Houghton County, Michigan, United States. Sidnaw is located in Duncan Township along M-28, 21 miles (34 km) southwest of L'Anse.

== History ==
Sidnaw was founded by lumber companies harvesting white pine in the area. The community was first platted by Thomas Nester in 1889. Sidnaw had a station on the Duluth, South Shore and Atlantic Railway. A post office opened in Sidnaw on December 7, 1889; George Garland was the first postmaster. The community's name is derived from an American Indian word meaning "small hill by a creek".

== In popular culture ==
Sidnaw appears in the 2000 film Reindeer Games, as it is the hometown of the main character, Rudy Duncan.
