= Baraga Township, Michigan =

- Civil township
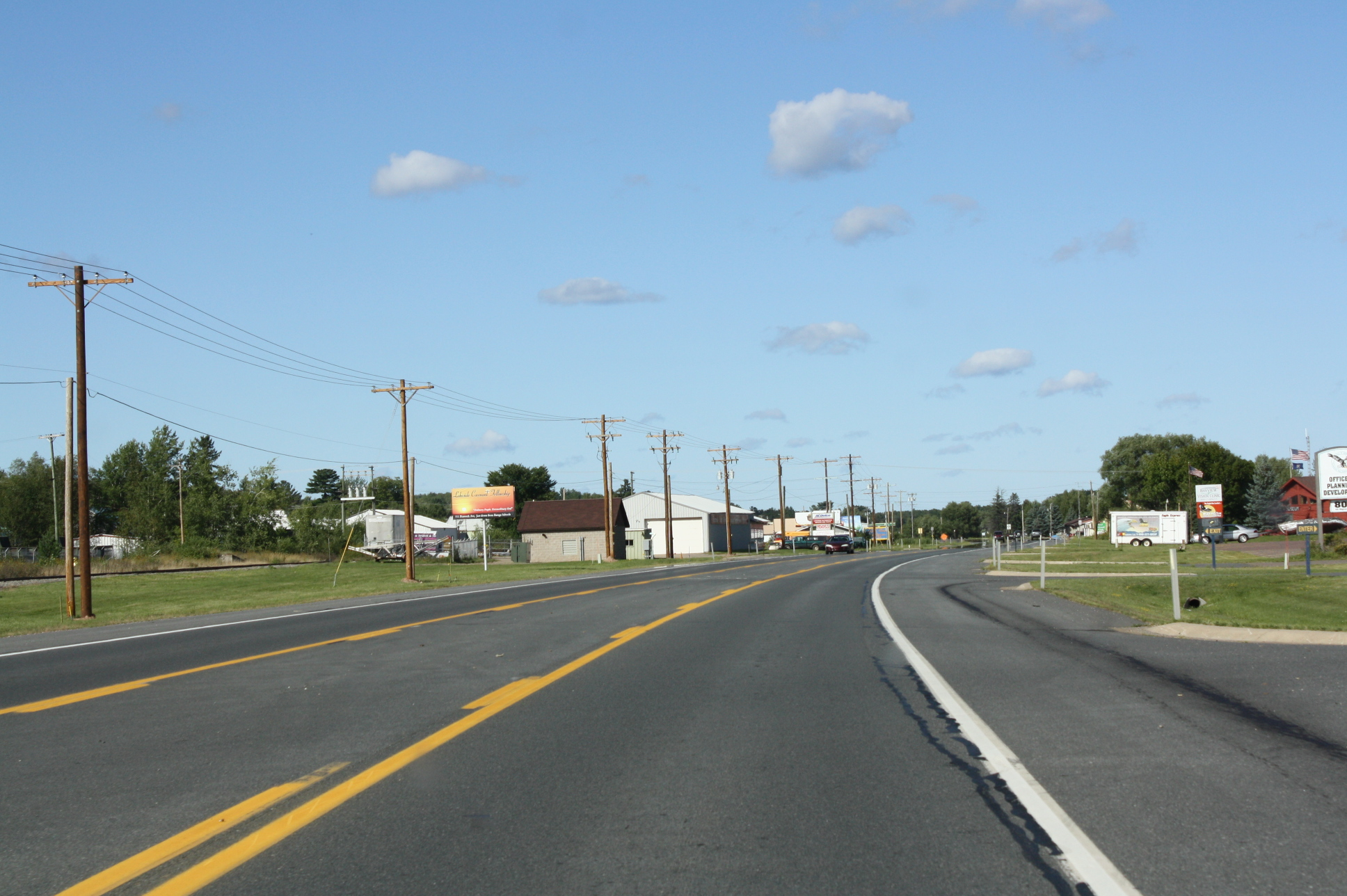
- The village of Baraga along US 41

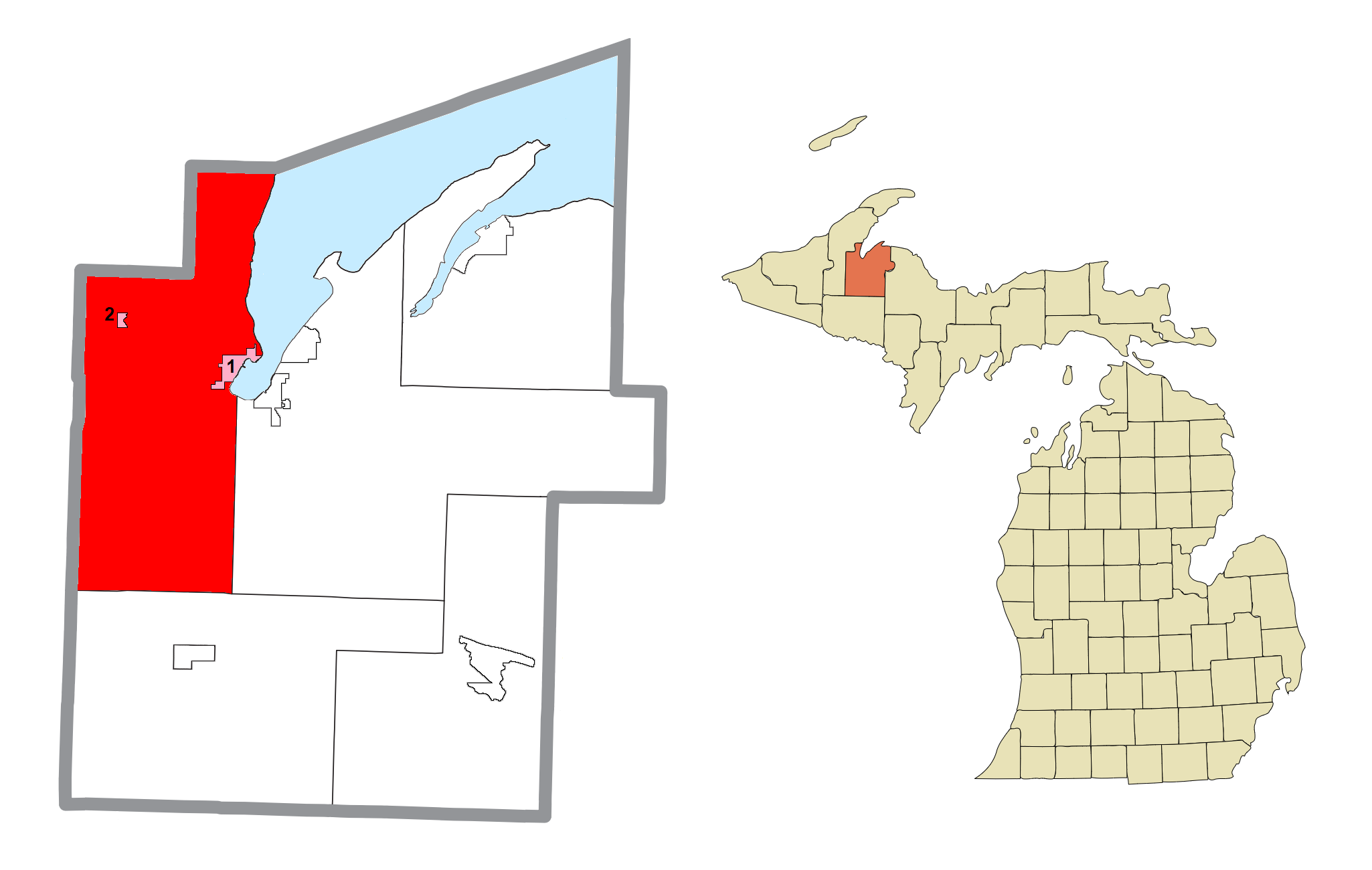
- Location within Baraga County and the administered village of Baraga (1) and the CDP of Pelkie (2)

- Location within the state of Michigan Location within the United States
- Coordinates: 46°44′19″N 88°34′19″W
- Country: United States
- State: Michigan
- County: Baraga
- Established: 1875

Government
  - Supervisor: George Danielson
  - Clerk: Michelle Fish

Area
  - Total: 187.20 sq mi (484.85 km^{2})
  - Land: 183.80 sq mi (476.04 km^{2})
  - Water: 3.40 sq mi (8.81 km^{2})
- Elevation: 863 ft (263 m)

Population (2020)
  - Total: 3,478
  - Density: 18.9/sq mi (7.3/km^{2})
- Time zone: UTC-5 (Eastern (EST))
  - Summer (DST): UTC-4 (EDT)
- ZIP code(s): 49908 (Baraga); 49919 (Covington); 49958 (Pelkie)
- Area code: 906
- FIPS code: 26-05340
- GNIS feature ID: 1625882
- Website: Official website

Baraga Township (/ˈbɛərəɡə/ BAIR-ə-gə) is a civil township of Baraga County in the U.S. state of Michigan. As of the 2020 census, the township population was 3,478. The village of Baraga is located in the southeast corner of the township. Baraga State Park is also located within the township.

== Communities ==
- Arnheim is an unincorporated community at 46°55′01″N 88°28′57″W. Arnheim was a station on the Duluth, South Shore and Atlantic Railway, midway between L'Anse and Houghton. Storekeeper Martin Erikson became the first postmaster on November 13, 1900. The office closed in either 1915 or 1916 and reopened from August 15, 1917, until September 30, 1951. Arnheim was named after Jeremiah Arn (died 1911). Jeremiah Arn was employed to strip the Portage Entry quarries until the over-burden of stone was removed. He settled on a farm at Arnheim and started a quarry which he worked for many years.
- Assinins is an unincorporated community at 46°48′37″N 88°28′38″W. Assinins was founded in 1843 by Catholic missionary Frederic Baraga, who named it for an Assiniboin chief whom Baraga had converted and who remained Baraga's devoted friend. In the 1870s, the settlement was known as the "Catholic Mission". The first post office in the area was named "Fewsville" from 1872, after Gershom B. Few, who operated a distillery, and George W. Few, who became the first postmaster on September 22, 1875. The office closed in 1877. It reopened as "Assinins" on December 6, 1894, with Simon Denomie as the first postmaster and discontinued on May 31, 1914.
- Baraga is a village and census-designated place at the junction of US Highway 41 and M-38 in the east-central portion of the township. The Baraga ZIP code 49908 serves a region in the central part of the township.
- Bear Town is a named place on US Highway 41 north of Baraga at 46°48′32″N 88°30′35″W.
- Fewsville – see Assinins.
- Froberg is an unincorporated community in the township.
- Iron Bridge is an unincorporated community in the township.
- Kelsey is an unincorporated community in the township.
- Keweenaw Bay is an unincorporated community at 46°51′37″N 88°28′54″W. A land patent was issued to Frank Laffrenire by US President Ulysses S. Grant on May 10, 1875. The settlement was known as "Leffenire" until 1898. Annie La Fernier became the first postmaster on March 26, 1898, with the office named "La Fernier". However, Annie had it changed on June 1, 1901, to the name of the large bay on which the village was located. The post office was discontinued on January 16, 1976, and became a CPO of Baraga. It was also a station on the Duluth, South Shore and Atlantic Railway. "Keweenaw" (kewawenon) was a Native American word for portage.
- Pelkie is an unincorporated community in the northeast part of the township. The Pelkie ZIP code 49958 serves areas in the northern and northwestern parts of the township.

== Geography ==
According to the United States Census Bureau, Baraga Township has a total area of 187.2 square miles (484.8 km^{2}), of which 183.8 square miles (476.0 km^{2}) is land and 3.4 square miles (8.8 km^{2}), or 1.82%, is water.

== Demographics ==
In 2020, its population was 3,478 and as of 2021 census estimates, it had a median household income of $40,403.
