= Nisula, Michigan =

- Unincorporated community
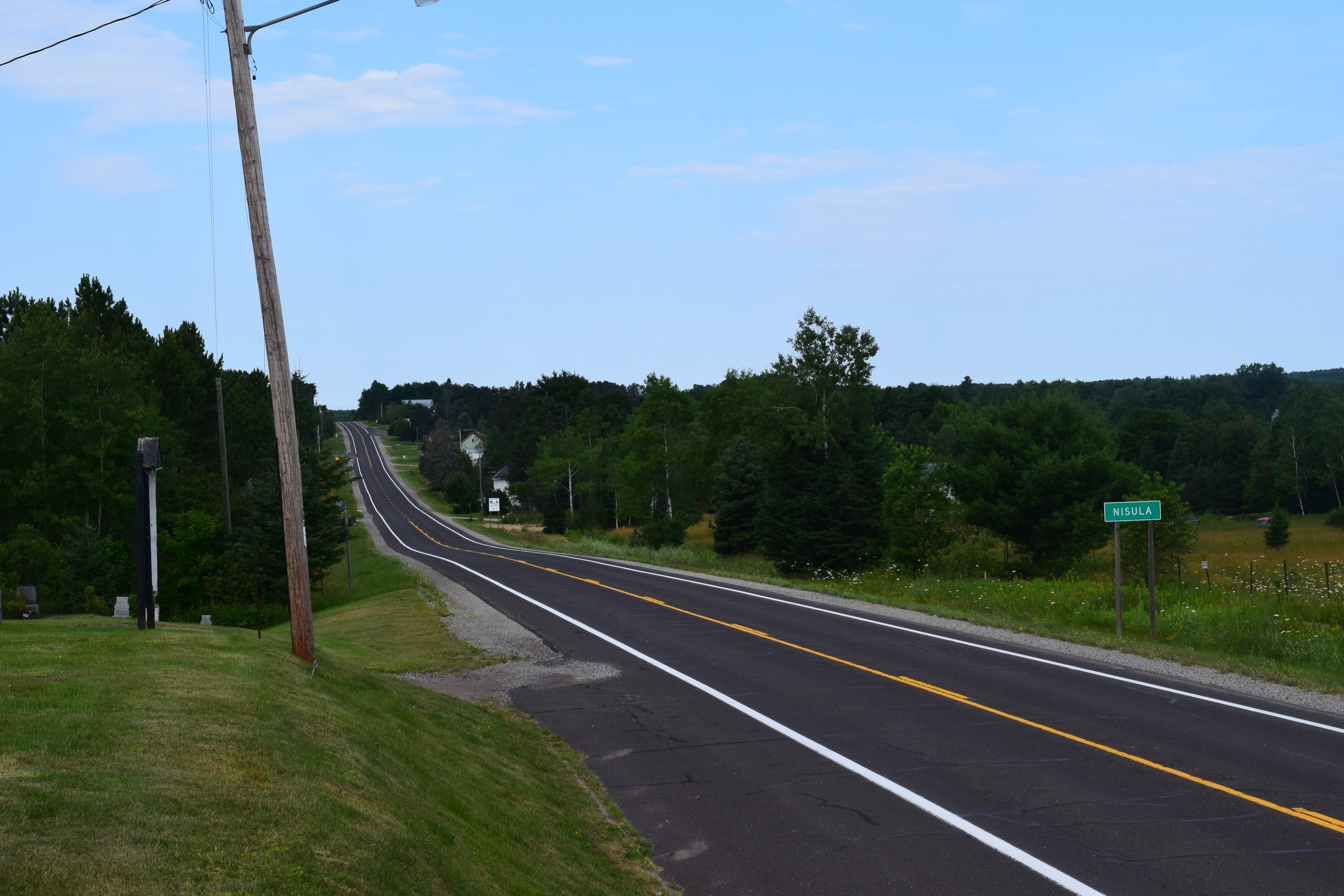
- Sign for Nisula on westbound M-38

- Location within Michigan
- Coordinates: 46°45′54″N 88°47′40″W
- Country: United States
- State: Michigan
- County: Houghton
- Township: Laird
- Elevation: 1,043 ft (318 m)
- Time zone: UTC-5 (Eastern (EST))
  - Summer (DST): UTC-4 (EDT)
- ZIP code(s): 49952
- Area code: 906
- GNIS feature ID: 1621015

Nisula is an unincorporated community in Houghton County, Michigan, United States. Nisula is located in Laird Township along M-38, 14.5 miles (23.3 km) west of Baraga. Nisula has a post office with ZIP code 49952. Today, Nisula is a farming community, and all that remains are the smooth, rolling and transparent countryside, the extensive foundations of various bygone dwellings and households, and a few homes which still stand along with a couple of modern-day farm buildings and structures.

== History ==
When the community was originally settled, it was under the name Faro. In 1894, Finns from Baraga had begun moving to the community. A post office opened in Nisula on 7 July 1903. The namesake of the community, August Nisula, was born in Reisjärvi, Oulun lääni, Finland in 1849. With his wife, Saara, he was among initial number of Finns who had migrated to Laird Township. He was an uncommonly large man and alike just as strong, it was as though, people would later recall, Nisula was meant to be a pioneer. August Nisula served as Nisula's first postmaster, and so the postal department decided the town should thenceforth be named after him. A Michigan Central Railroad station opened in Nisula in the year of 1903.
