= Duncan Township, Michigan =

- Civil township
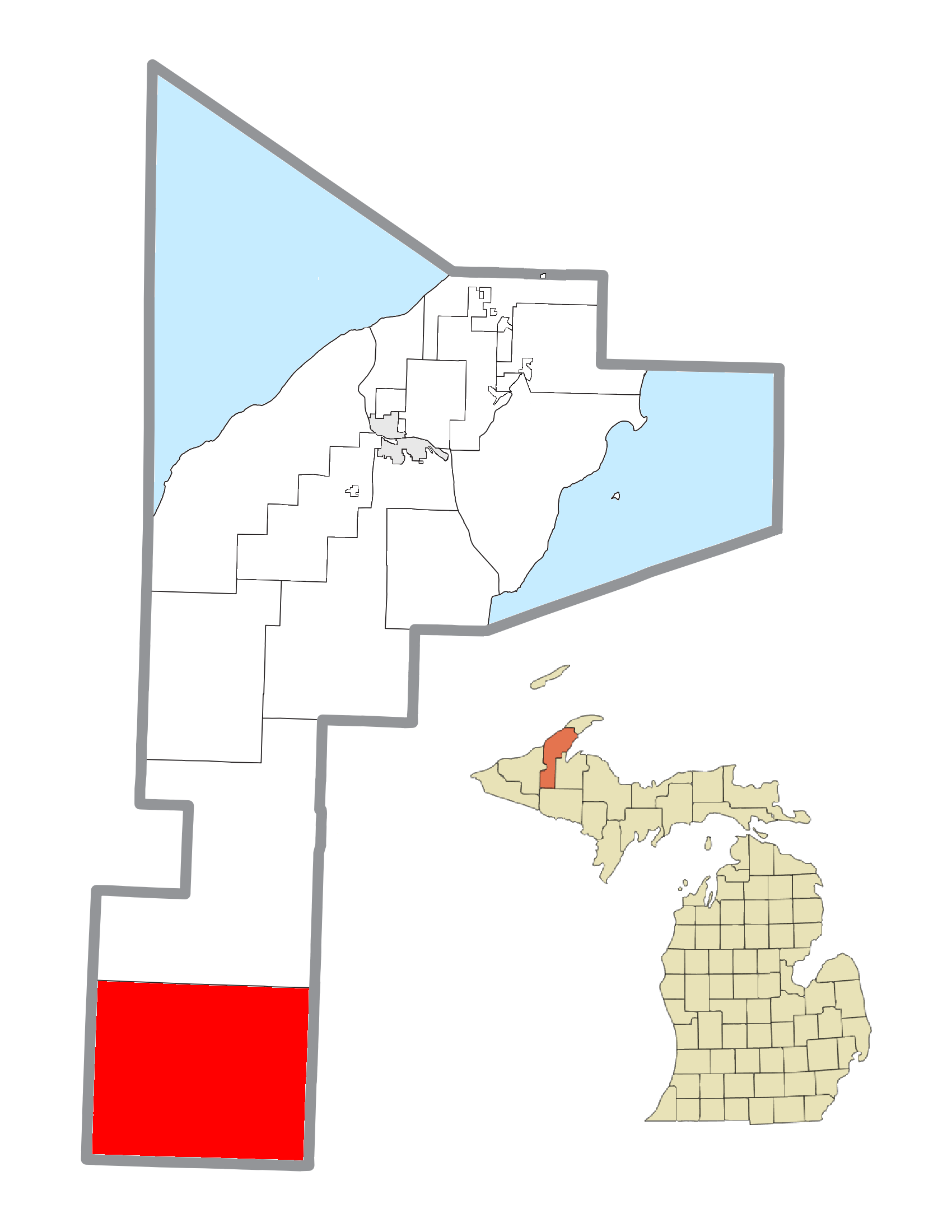
- Location within Houghton County

- Location within the state of Michigan Duncan Township (the United States)
- Coordinates: 46°29′42″N 88°50′09″W
- Country: United States
- State: Michigan
- County: Houghton

Area
  - Total: 177.6 sq mi (459.9 km^{2})
  - Land: 176.5 sq mi (457.1 km^{2})
  - Water: 1.1 sq mi (2.9 km^{2})
- Elevation: 1,280 ft (390 m)

Population (2020)
  - Total: 234
  - Density: 1.33/sq mi (0.512/km^{2})
- Time zone: UTC-5 (Eastern (EST))
  - Summer (DST): UTC-4 (EDT)
- ZIP code(s): 49961 (Sidnaw); 49967 (Trout Creek); 49970 (Watton)
- Area code: 906
- FIPS code: 26-23340
- GNIS feature ID: 1626195

Duncan Township is a civil township of Houghton County in the U.S. state of Michigan. As of the 2020 census, the township population was 234.

== Communities ==
- Kenton is an unincorporated community in the southwest part of the township on M-28 and the East Branch of the Ontonagon River at 46°29′08″N 88°53′39″W. The ZIP Code is 49967. Kenton was a station on the Duluth, South Shore and Atlantic Railway. A post office was established in February 1889.
- Sidnaw is an unincorporated community along M-28, 21 miles (34 km) southwest of L'Anse. Sidnaw has a post office with ZIP code 49961.

== Geography ==
According to the United States Census Bureau, the township has a total area of 177.6 square miles (460 km^{2}), of which 176.5 square miles (457 km^{2}) is land and 1.1 square miles (2.8 km^{2}) (0.63%) is water.

== Demographics ==
As of the census of 2000, there were 280 people, 146 households, and 83 families residing in the township. The population density was 1.6 inhabitants per square mile (0.62/km^{2}). There were 399 housing units at an average density of 2.3 per square mile (0.89/km^{2}). The racial makeup of the township was 95.36% White, 1.07% Native American, 2.14% Asian, and 1.43% from two or more races. Hispanic or Latino of any race were 1.07% of the population. 24.2% were of Finnish, 16.1% English, 10.0% French, 10.0% Swedish, 7.1% German, 6.2% Irish and 5.7% United States or American ancestry according to Census 2000.

There were 146 households, out of which 14.4% had children under the age of 18 living with them, 47.9% were married couples living together, 6.8% had a female householder with no husband present, and 42.5% were non-families. 38.4% of all households were made up of individuals, and 19.9% had someone living alone who was 65 years of age or older. The average household size was 1.92 and the average family size was 2.50.

In the township the population was spread out, with 13.2% under the age of 18, 5.0% from 18 to 24, 17.9% from 25 to 44, 37.5% from 45 to 64, and 26.4% who were 65 years of age or older. The median age was 52 years. For every 100 females, there were 117.1 males. For every 100 females age 18 and over, there were 115.0 males.

The median income for a household in the township was $27,625, and the median income for a family was $30,192. Males had a median income of $30,750 versus $26,667 for females. The per capita income for the township was $13,484. About 17.4% of families and 17.9% of the population were below the poverty line, including 38.8% of those under the age of eighteen and 6.1% of those 65 or over.
