= Baraga Correctional Facility =

Prison in Baraga, Michigan, United States

Baraga Correctional Facility (AMF)
- Interactive map of Baraga Correctional Facility (AMF)
- Location: Baraga, Michigan; 46.76475°N 88.50563°W
- Status: Open
- Security class: Level I & V
- Opened: 1993
- Managed by: Michigan Department of Corrections
- Director: Warden Terry Wilkins
- Website: Official website

Baraga Correctional Facility (AMF) is a Michigan prison, located in Baraga, for adult male prisoners. While it includes a Level I security facility, it is primarily a maximum security prison.

== Facility ==
The prison was opened in 1993 and has 7 housing units currently used for Michigan Department of Corrections male prisoners 18 years of age and older. One of the housing units has 176 beds for Secure Level I (lower level security) prisoners. The other six housing units are for Level V (maximum security) prisoners. Four of the Level V housing units are used by the general prison population, and Onsite facilities provide for foodservice, health care, facility maintenance, storage, and prison administration.

=== Security ===
The facility is surrounded by double fences with razor-ribbon wire. Electronic detection systems and patrol vehicles are also utilized to maintain perimeter security.

== Services ==
The facility offers education programs, substance-abuse treatment, psychotherapy, counseling, and religious services. Onsite medical and dental care is supplemented by local community providers, the Brooks Medical Center at Marquette Branch Prison and the Duane L. Waters Hospital in Jackson, Michigan.

== See also ==
- List of Michigan state prisons
