= Forest Highway =

Type of highway

Forest Highway System
- Highway markers for Forest Highways 3, 33, and Puerto Rican Forest Highway 191

System information
- Formed: 1921

Highway names
- Forest Highway: Forest Highway nn Federal Forest Highway nn (FFH nn); Forest Route nn

Forest Highways or Forest Routes are a category of roads within United States National Forests. They are built to connect the national forests to the existing state highway systems, and to provide improved access to recreational and logging areas.

== Description ==
United States federal law defines the term Forest Highway as "a forest road under the jurisdiction of, and maintained by, a public authority and open to public travel." Forest highways are designated by the United States Forest Service and funded by the federal government, but are generally owned and maintained by the states or counties in which they are located. The forest highway system comprises approximately 29,000 miles (47,000 km) of roads. Forest highways are usually marked with markers in the shape of an isosceles trapezoid, wider at the top and narrower at the base. The shields are brown with a white border and divided by a horizontal white line. In the majority of the space (above the line), the number of the route appears in white Highway Gothic numbers, while in the smaller space below the line is written "National Forest" in the cursive Forest Service logotype used to write "National Forest" on national forest gateway signs. To qualify for inclusion in the system, a roadway must "be wholly or partially within, or adjacent to, and serving the National Forest System" among other criteria.

== History ==
In the 1920s, forest highway was a class of federal aid, and could be used outside forests, as long as the projects improved access to the forests.

== Gallery ==
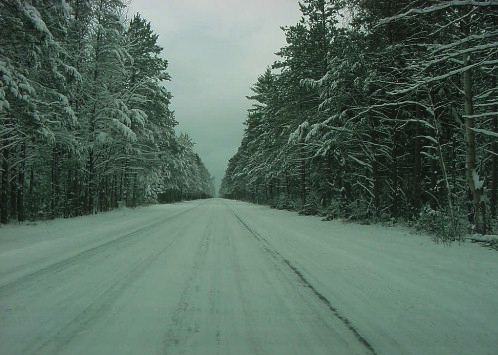
Federal Forest Highway 13 in the Upper Peninsula of Michigan

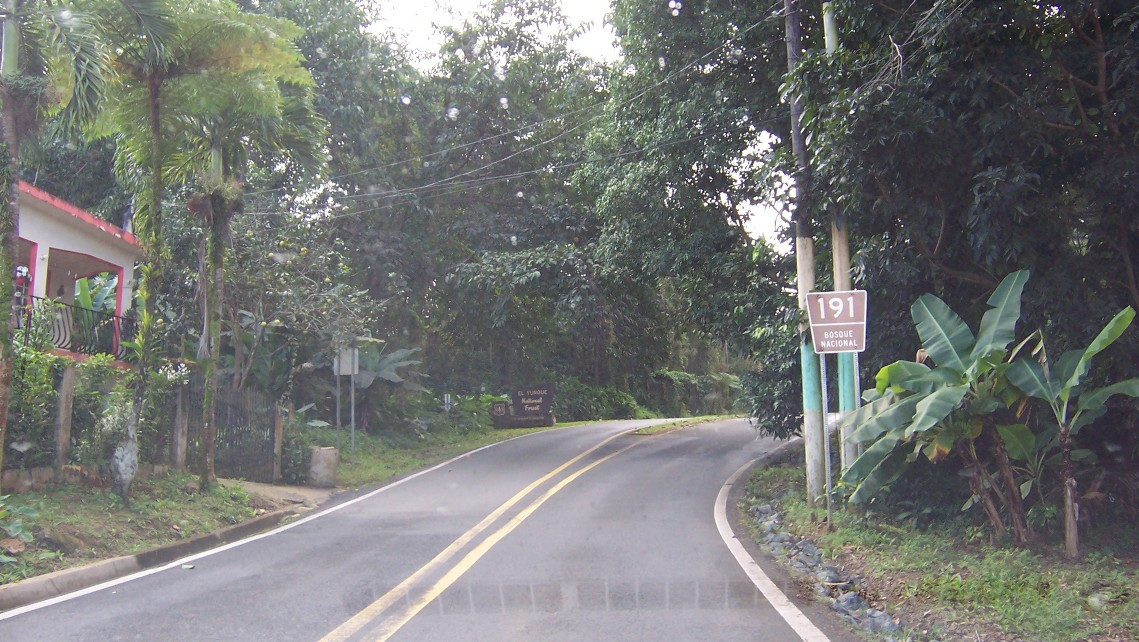
Forest Highway 191 in El Yunque National Forest

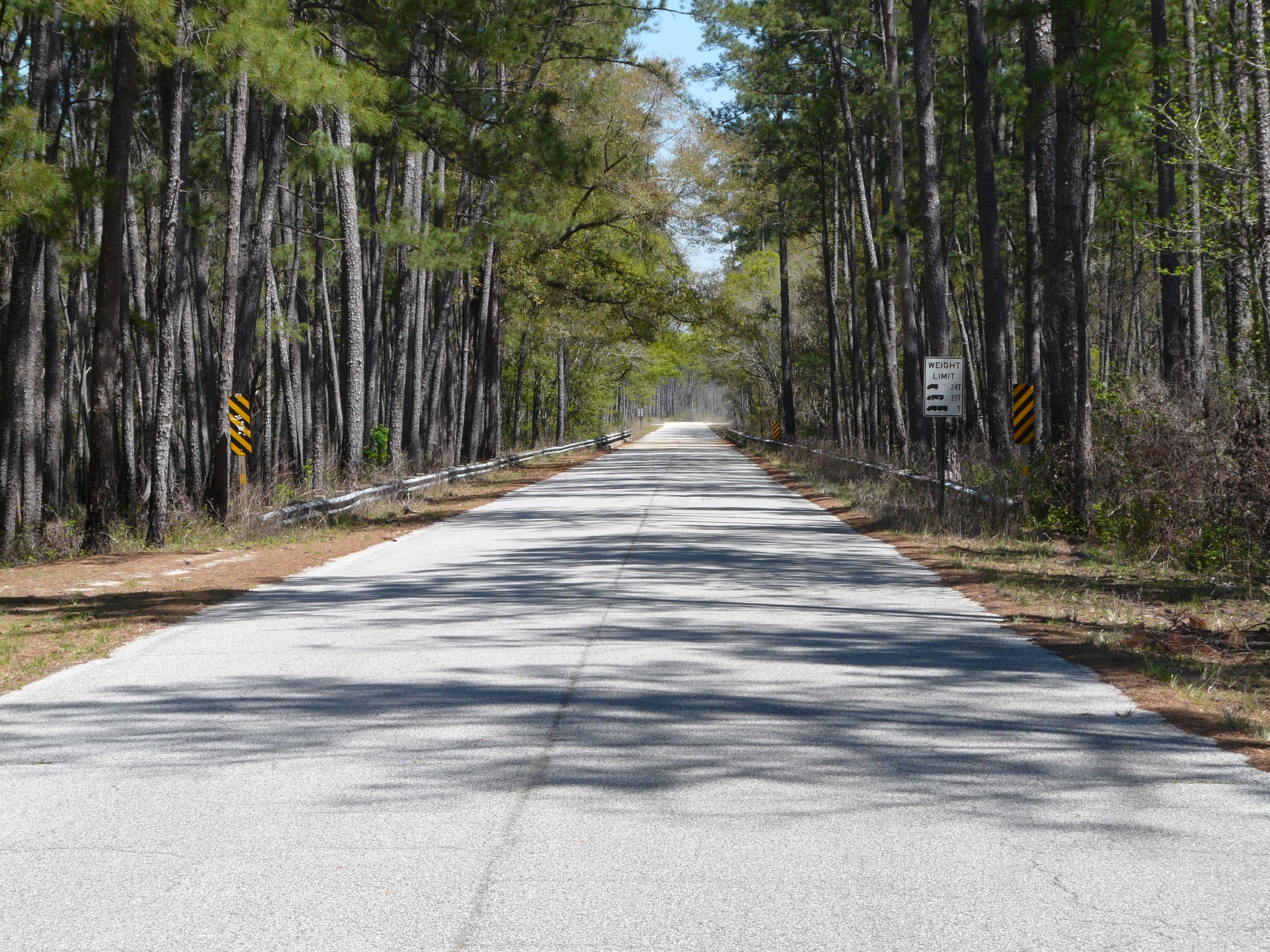
Forest Highway 13 in the Apalachicola National Forest

== See also ==
- Forest road
- National Forest Scenic Byway
