= Baraga, Michigan =

- Village
- Village of Baraga
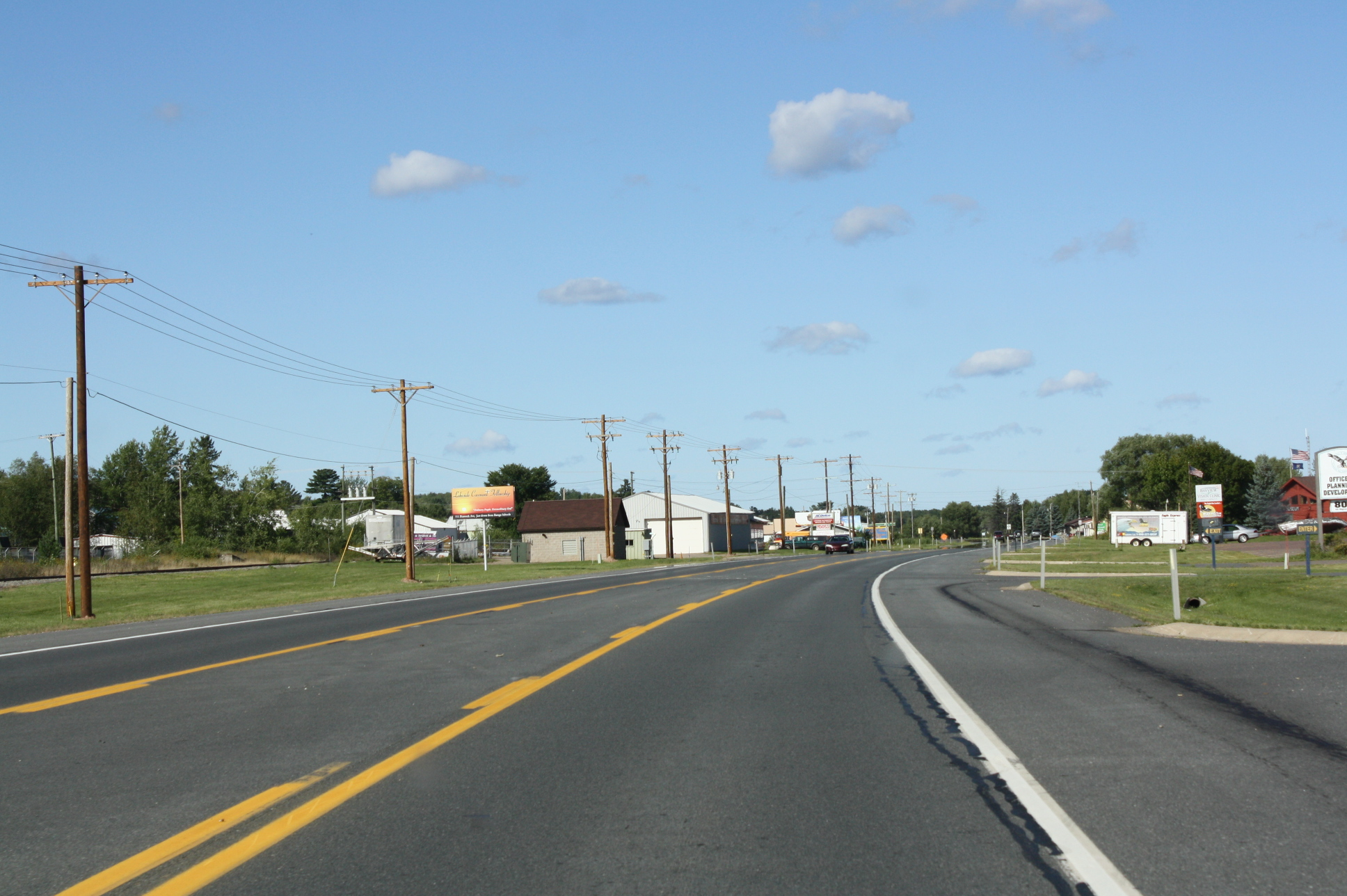
- Downtown Baraga along U.S. Route 41

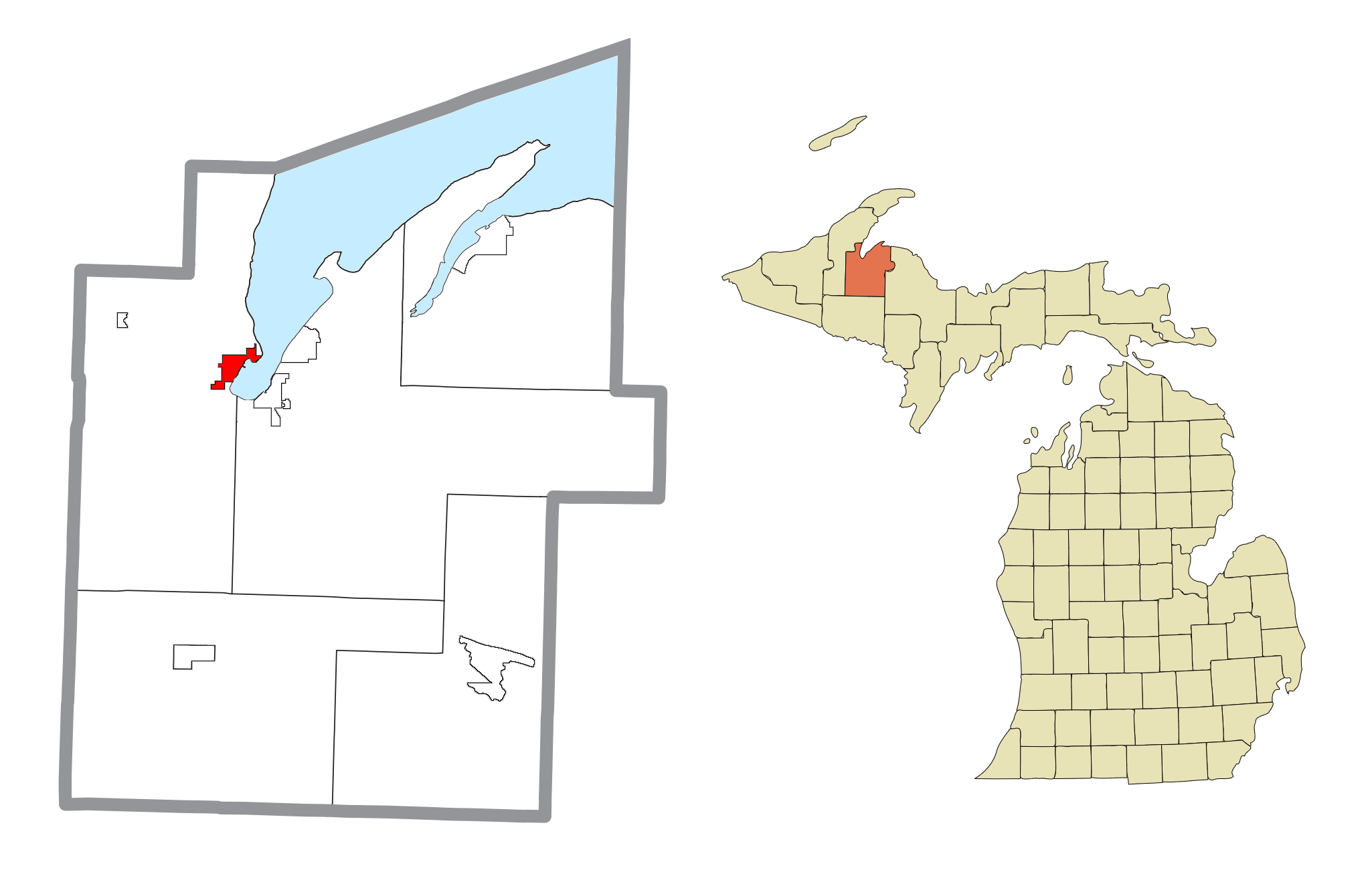
- Location within Baraga County

- Location within the state of Michigan Location within the United States
- Coordinates: 46°46′36″N 88°29′46″W
- Country: United States
- State: Michigan
- County: Baraga
- Township: Baraga
- Settled: 1843
- Incorporated: 1891

Government
  - Type: Village council
  - President: Scott Koski
  - Clerk: Diane Mayo

Area
  - Total: 2.17 sq mi (5.63 km^{2})
  - Land: 2.13 sq mi (5.51 km^{2})
  - Water: 0.046 sq mi (0.12 km^{2})
- Elevation: 630 ft (192 m)

Population (2020)
  - Total: 1,883
  - Density: 884.03/sq mi (341.33/km^{2})
- Time zone: UTC-5 (Eastern (EST))
  - Summer (DST): UTC-4 (EDT)
- ZIP code(s): 49908
- Area code: 906
- FIPS code: 26-05320
- GNIS feature ID: 2398031
- Website: Official website

Baraga (/ˈbɛərəɡə/ BAIR-ə-gə) is a village in Baraga County in the U.S. state of Michigan. The population was 1,883 at the 2020 census. The village is named after Bishop Frederic Baraga.

The village is located in Baraga Township on the Keweenaw Bay on Lake Superior at the junction of US 41 and M-38. It is entirely within the boundaries of the L'Anse Indian Reservation. The Baraga ZIP code 49908 also serves areas of northern and northwestern Baraga Township.

== History ==
Baraga began with the establishment of the Holy Name Mission at this site by Rev. Frederic Baraga in 1843.

The post office opened with the name Bristol on June 29, 1869, and changed to Baraga on May 11, 1870.

In 1993, the Baraga Correctional Facility was opened in the town.

On May 30, 2022, a consortium including Finnish technology giant Wärtsilä, the Electric Power Research Institute (EPRI), and Burns & McDonnell unveiled a contract with Milwaukee-based WEC Energy's subsidiary Upper Michigan Energy Resources for a fuel testing pilot.

== Geography ==
According to the United States Census Bureau, the village has a total area of 2.18 square miles (5.65 km^{2}), of which 2.12 square miles (5.49 km^{2}) is land and 0.06 square miles (0.16 km^{2}) is water.

== Demographics ==
Historical population
Census	Pop.	Note	%±
1900	1,185		—
1910	1,071		−9.6%
1920	942		−12.0%
1930	1,045		10.9%
1940	1,110		6.2%
1950	942		−15.1%
1960	991		5.2%
1970	1,116		12.6%
1980	1,055		−5.5%
1990	1,231		16.7%
2000	1,285		4.4%
2010	2,053		59.8%
2020	1,883		−8.3%
U.S. Decennial Census

=== 2020 census ===
As of the 2020 census, Baraga had a population of 1,883. The population density was 885.7 inhabitants per square mile (342.0/km^{2}). The median age was 34.8 years. 13.4% of residents were under the age of 18 and 12.9% of residents were 65 years of age or older. For every 100 females there were 230.4 males, and for every 100 females age 18 and over there were 259.3 males age 18 and over.

0.0% of residents lived in urban areas, while 100.0% lived in rural areas.

There were 510 households in Baraga, of which 28.4% had children under the age of 18 living in them. Of all households, 27.6% were married-couple households, 22.0% were households with a male householder and no spouse or partner present, and 41.2% were households with a female householder and no spouse or partner present. About 43.6% of all households were made up of individuals and 19.8% had someone living alone who was 65 years of age or older.

There were 617 housing units at an average density of 290.2 per square mile (112.0/km^{2}), of which 17.3% were vacant. The homeowner vacancy rate was 3.6% and the rental vacancy rate was 15.4%.

Racial composition as of the 2020 census
Race	Number	Percent
White	700	37.2%
Black or African American	592	31.4%
American Indian and Alaska Native	430	22.8%
Asian	2	0.1%
Native Hawaiian and Other Pacific Islander	0	0.0%
Some other race	17	0.9%
Two or more races	142	7.5%
Hispanic or Latino (of any race)	22	1.2%

=== 2010 census ===
As of the census of 2010, there were 2,053 people, 527 households, and 310 families residing in the village. The population density was 968.4 inhabitants per square mile (373.9/km^{2}). There were 580 housing units at an average density of 273.6 per square mile (105.6/km^{2}). The racial makeup of the village was 44.9% White, 29.4% African American, 22.0% Native American, 0.1% Asian, 0.1% from other races, and 3.6% from two or more races. Hispanic or Latino residents of any race were 1.0% of the population.

There were 527 households, of which 33.0% had children under the age of 18 living with them, 34.0% were married couples living together, 18.4% had a female householder with no husband present, 6.5% had a male householder with no wife present, and 41.2% were non-families. 37.0% of all households were made up of individuals, and 16.3% had someone living alone who was 65 years of age or older. The average household size was 2.26 and the average family size was 2.90.

The median age in the village was 35.7 years. 15.8% of residents were under the age of 18; 10.5% were between the ages of 18 and 24; 40.9% were from 25 to 44; 22.6% were from 45 to 64; and 10% were 65 years of age or older. The gender makeup of the village was 68.8% male and 31.2% female.

=== 2000 census ===
As of the census of 2000, there were 1,285 people, 544 households, and 326 families residing in the village. The population density was 569.6 inhabitants per square mile (219.9/km^{2}). There were 605 housing units at an average density of 268.2 per square mile (103.6/km^{2}). The racial makeup of the village was 68.79% White, 0.16% African American, 23.97% Native American, 0.62% Asian, 0.31% from other races, and 6.15% from two or more races. Hispanic or Latino residents of any race were 0.86% of the population. 25.5% were of Finnish, 9.9% French, 9.2% German, and 6.3% French-Canadian ancestry according to Census 2000.

There were 544 households, out of which 31.3% had children under the age of 18 living with them, 40.6% were married couples living together, 15.6% had a female householder with no husband present, and 39.9% were non-families. 36.2% of all households were made up of individuals, and 17.1% had someone living alone who was 65 years of age or older. The average household size was 2.34 and the average family size was 3.03.

In the village, 27.2% of the population was under the age of 18, 7.8% was from 18 to 24, 26.3% from 25 to 44, 22.0% from 45 to 64, and 16.7% was 65 years of age or older. The median age was 37 years. For every 100 females, there were 87.6 males. For every 100 females age 18 and over, there were 81.4 males.

The median income for a household in the village was $26,290, and the median income for a family was $33,906. Males had a median income of $31,838 versus $21,333 for females. The per capita income for the village was $14,795. About 9.8% of families and 15.6% of the population were below the poverty line, including 14.2% of those under age 18 and 20.1% of those age 65 or over.

== Transportation ==
Indian Trails bus lines operates daily intercity bus service between Hancock and Milwaukee with a stop in Baraga Township, just outside Baraga.

== Gallery ==
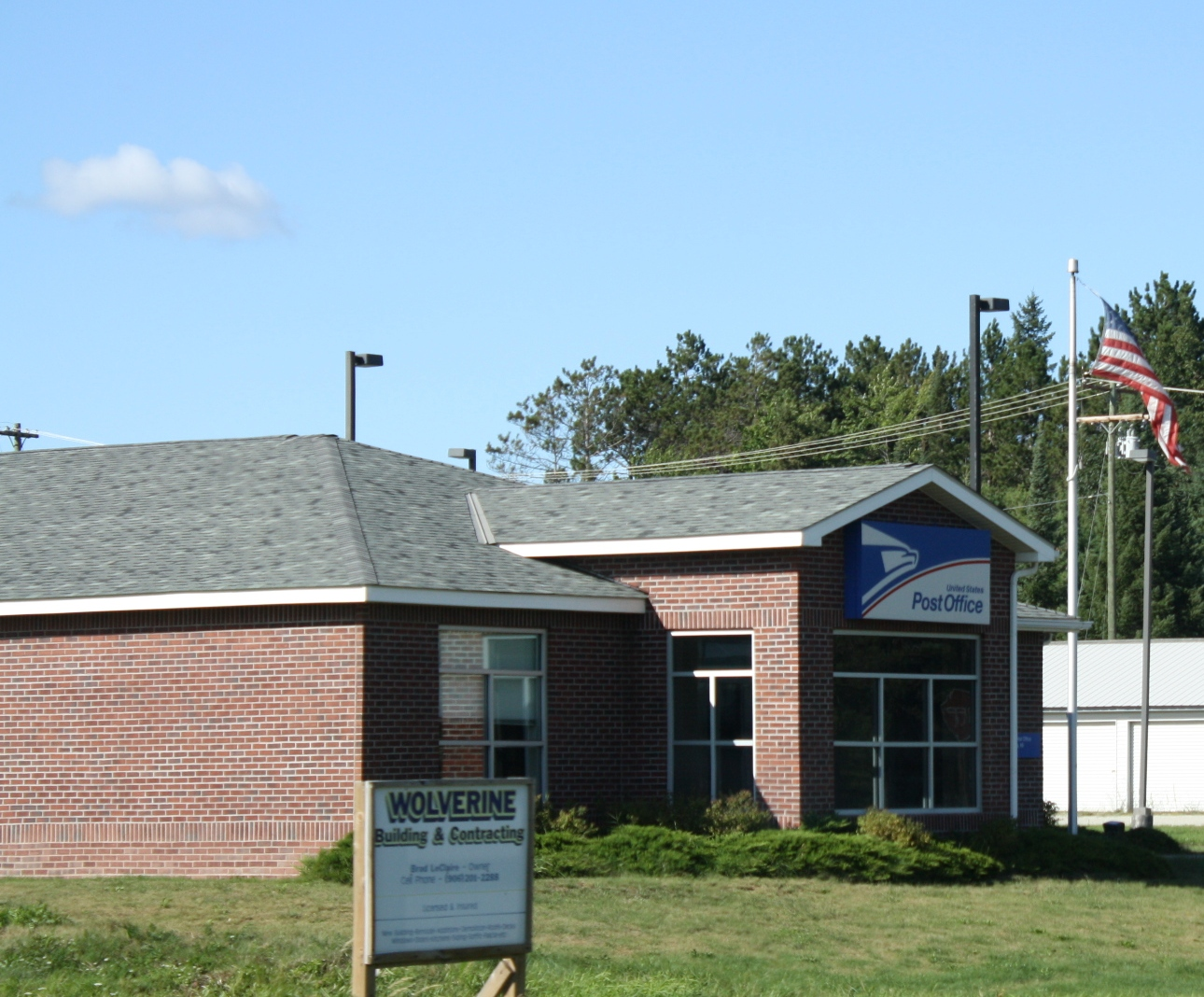
Post office

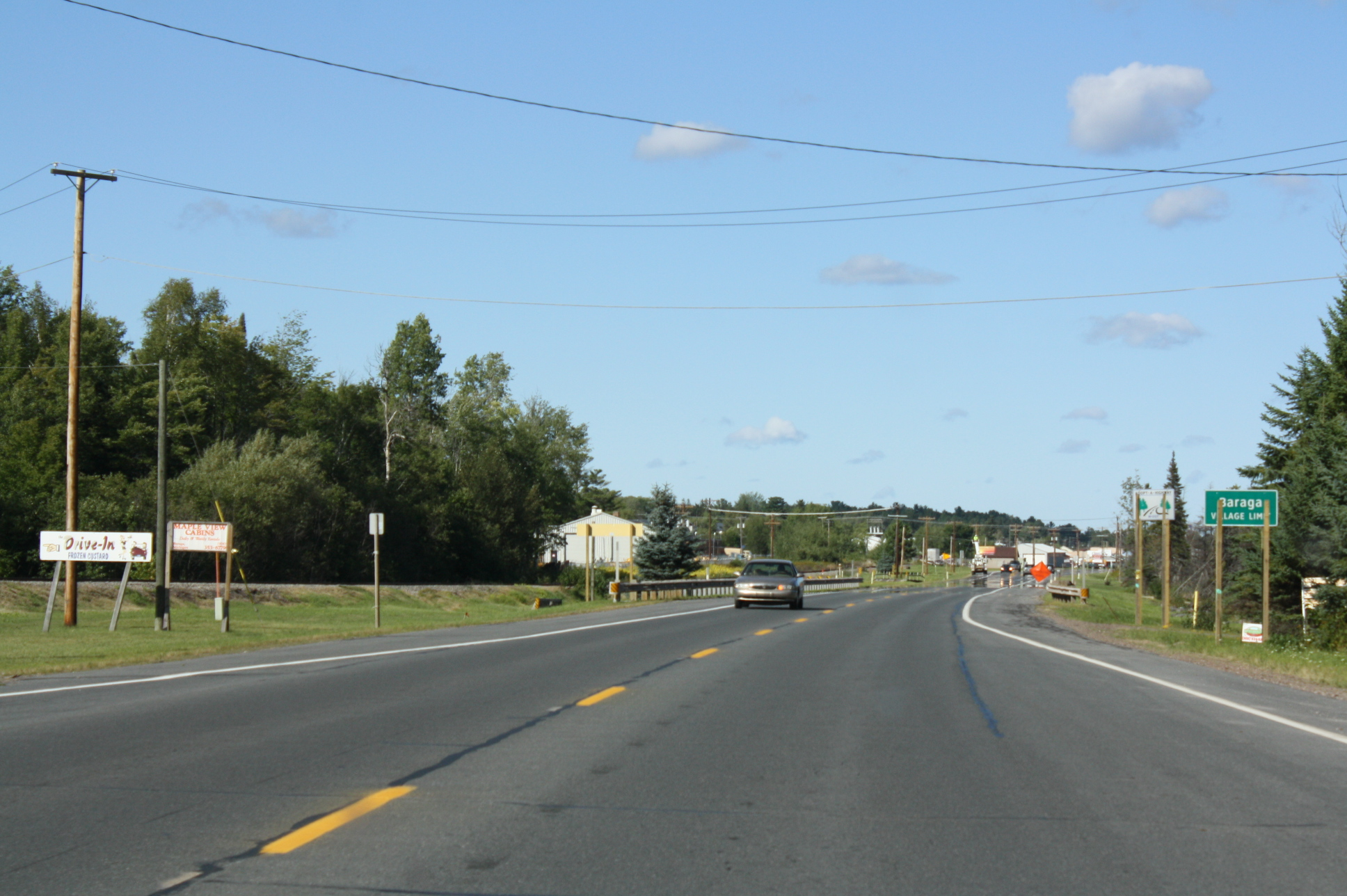
Welcome sign

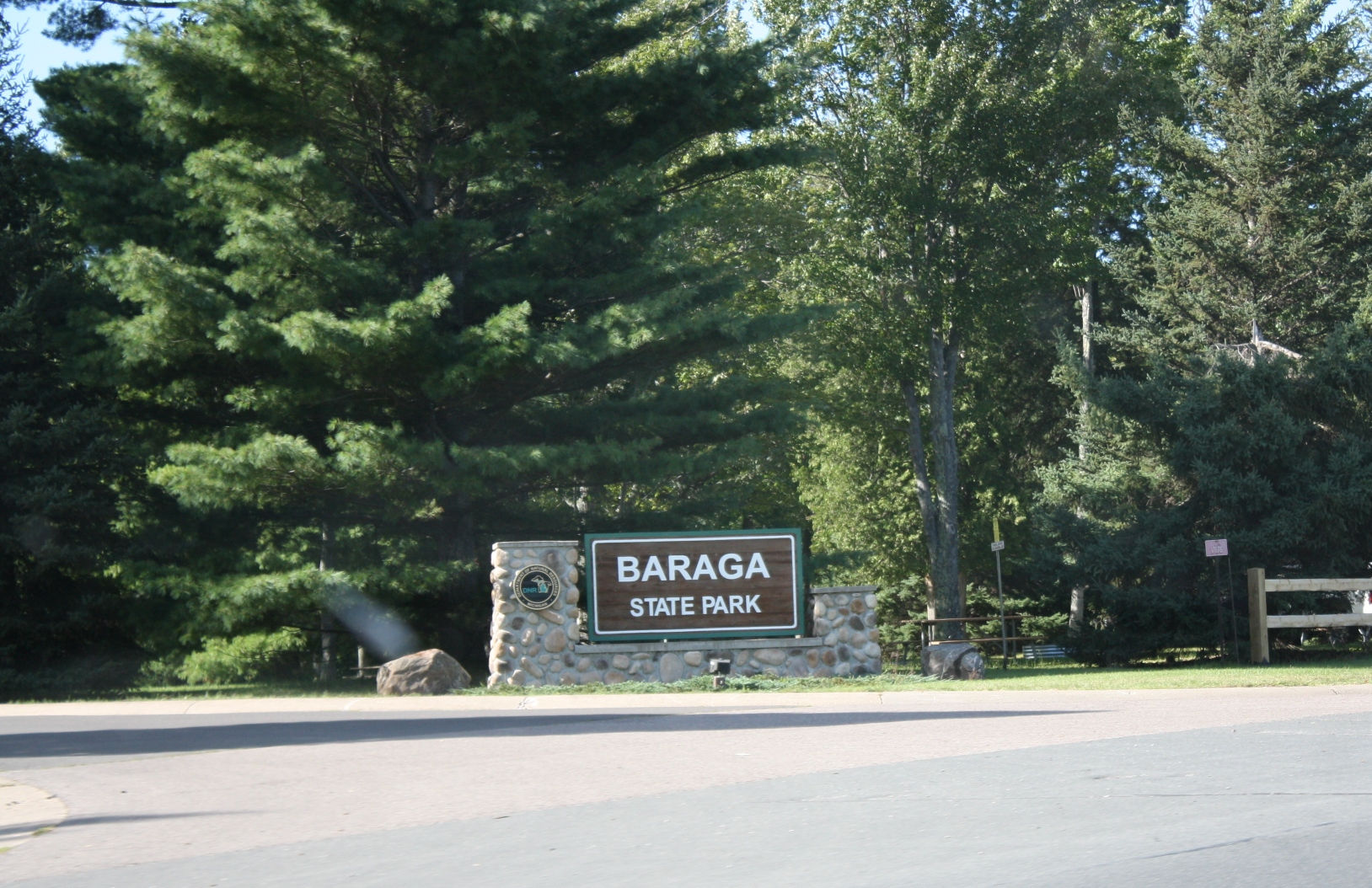
Baraga State Park entrance

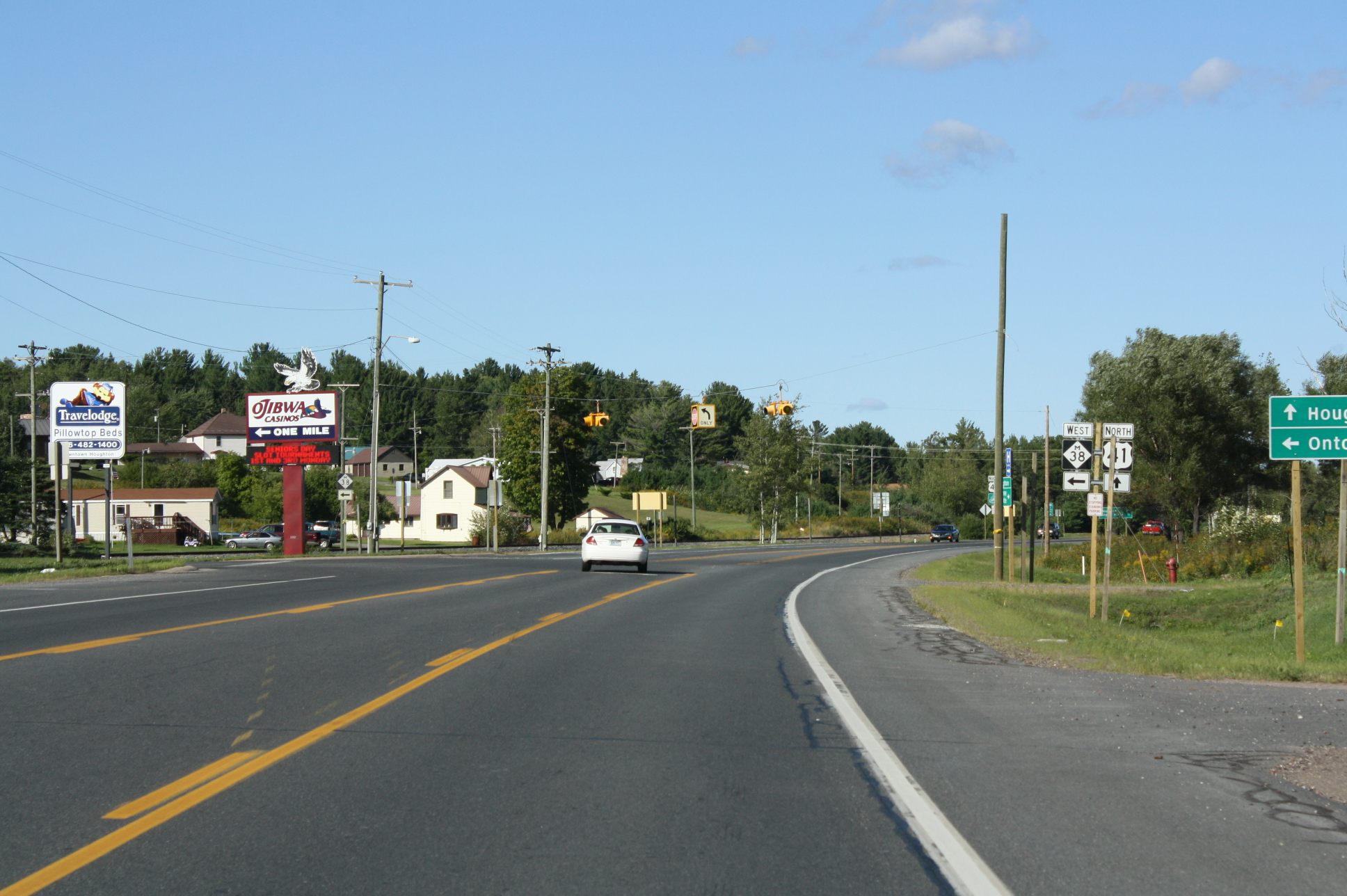
M-38 east terminus

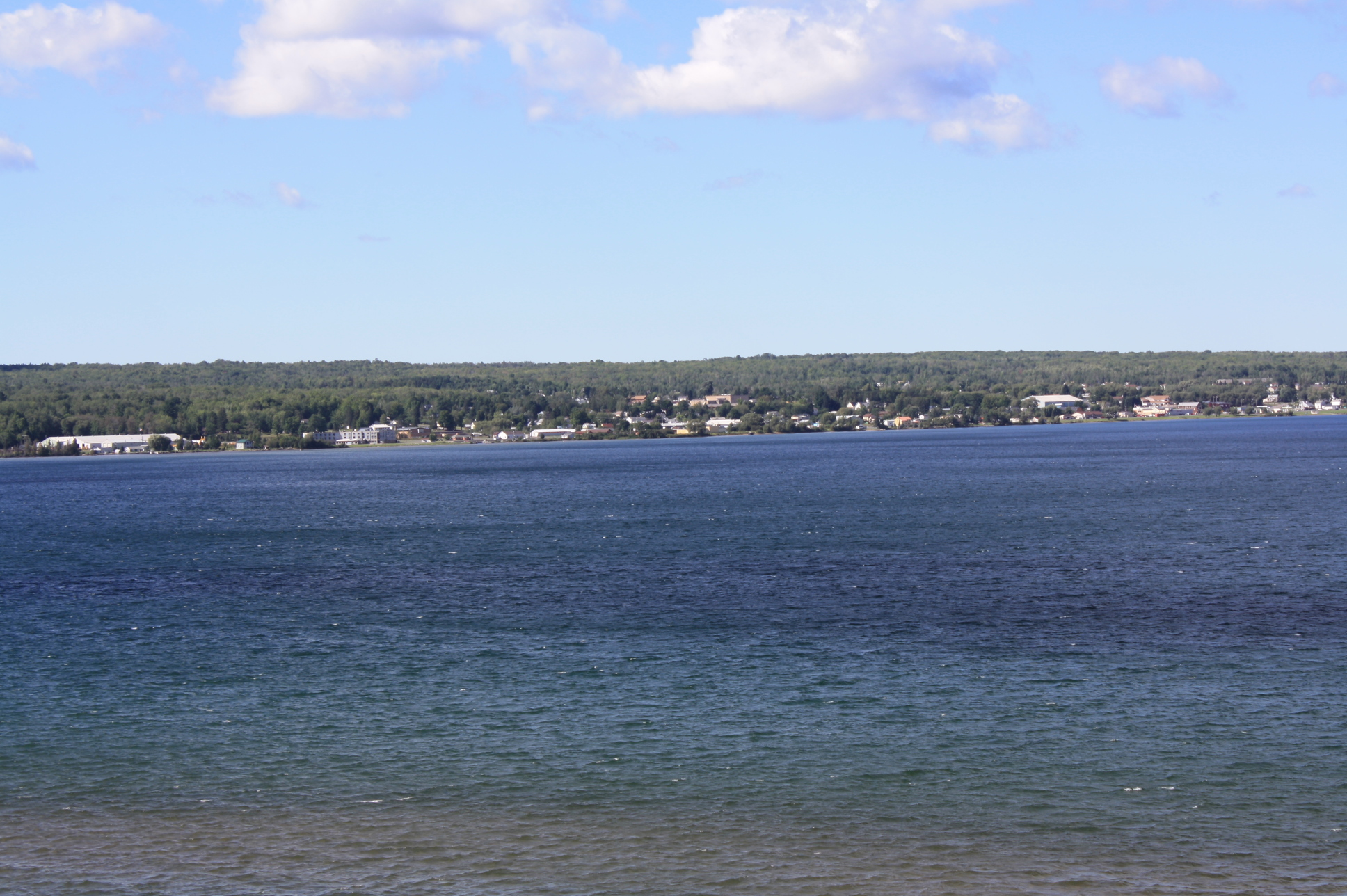
Panorama over Lake Superior

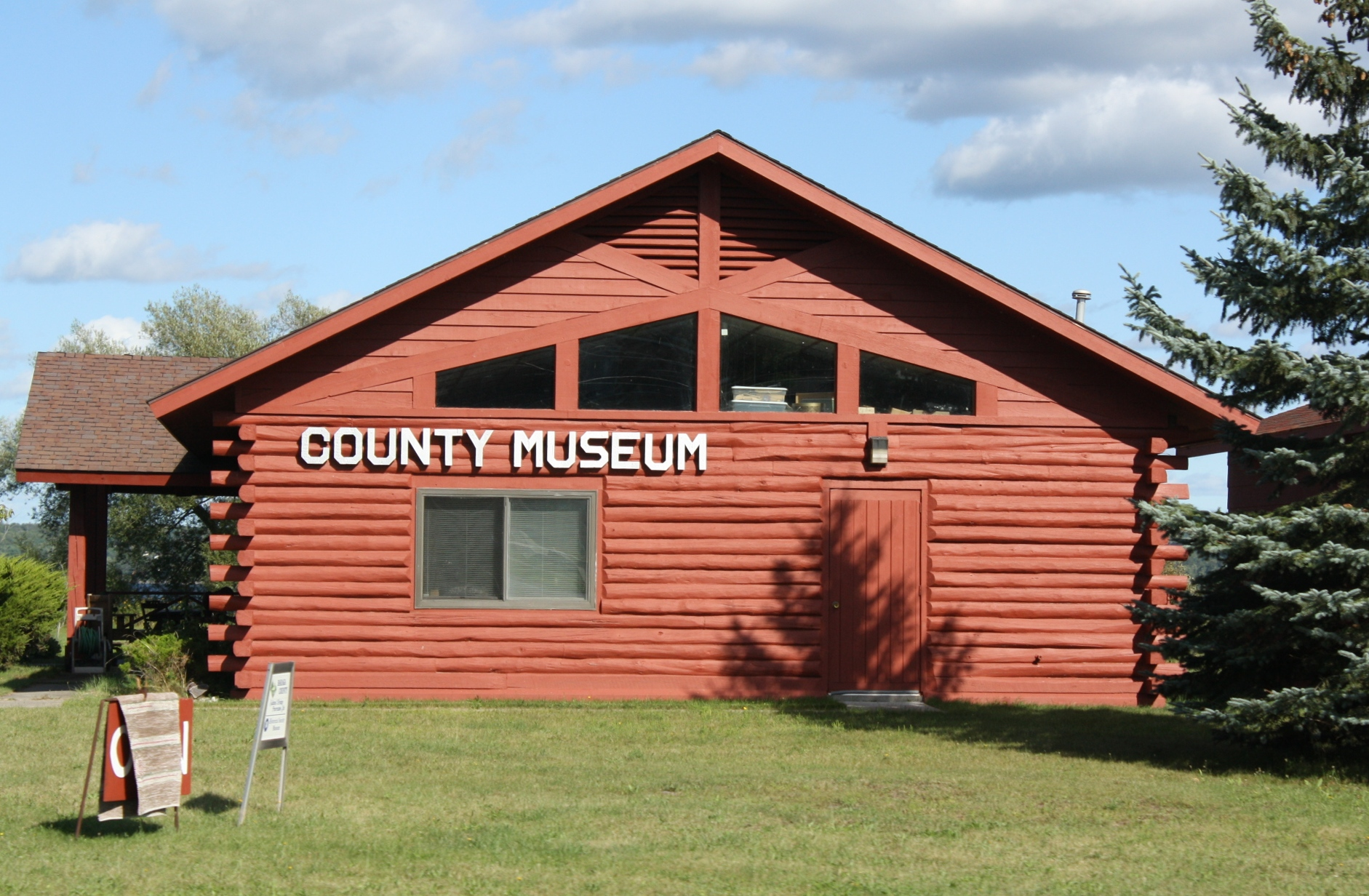
Baraga County Historical Museum
