= Pelkie, Michigan =

- Census-designated place (CDP) & unincorporated community
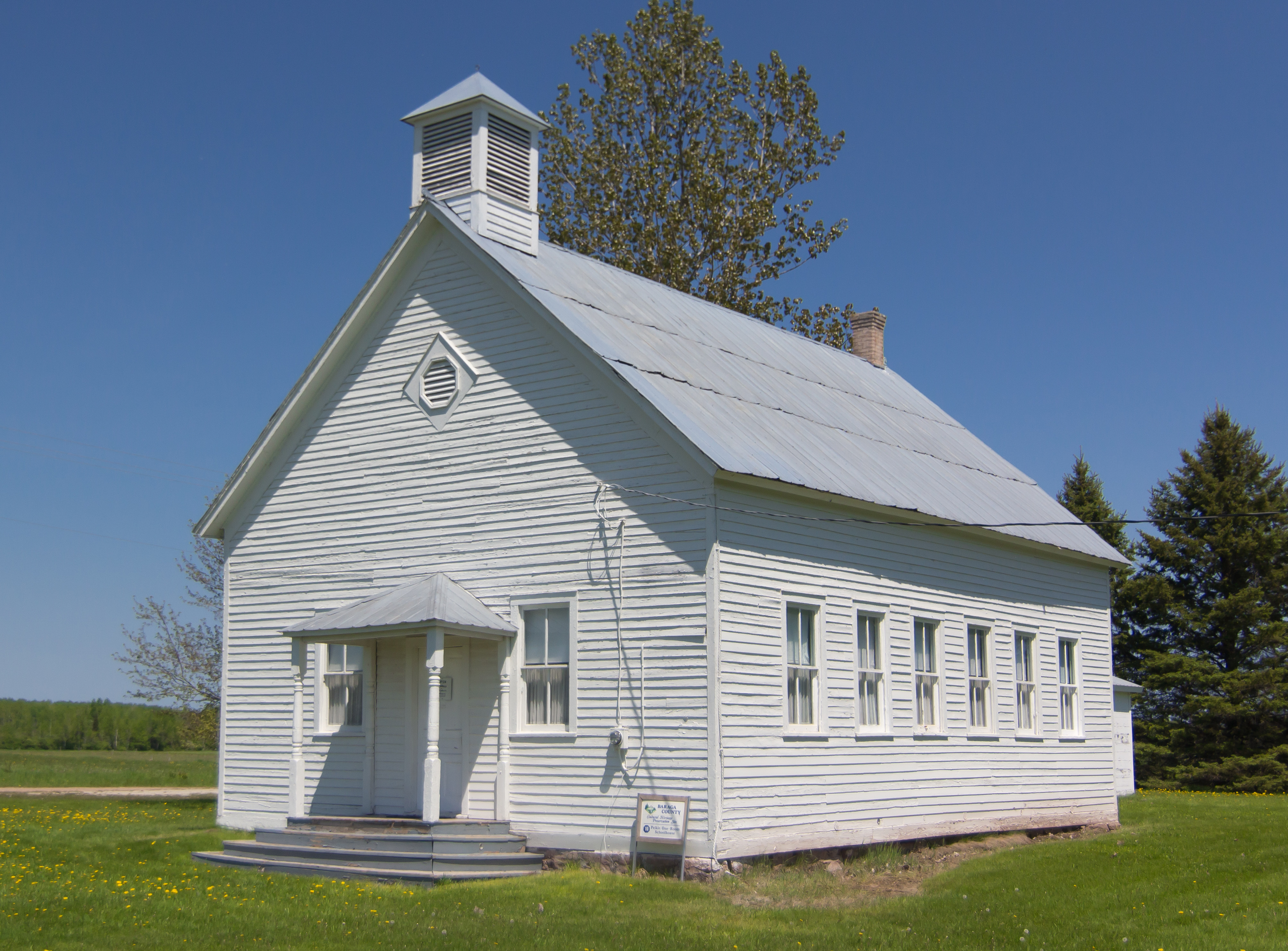
- The historic Pelkie School museum

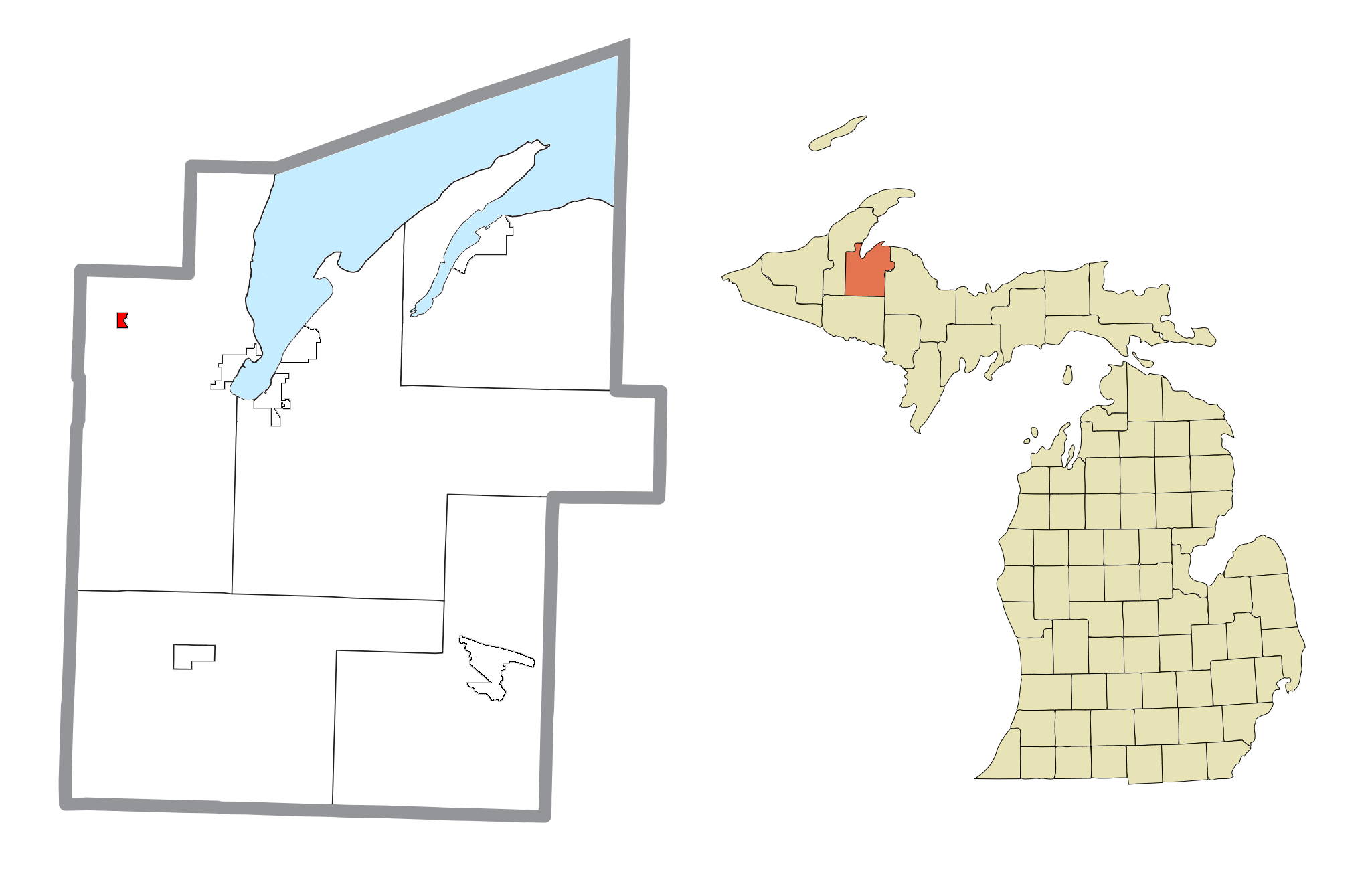
- Location within Baraga County

- Location within the state of Michigan Location within the United States
- Coordinates: 46°48′48″N 88°38′11″W
- Country: United States
- State: Michigan
- County: Baraga
- Township: Baraga
- Settled: 1885

Area
  - Total: 1.34 sq mi (3.48 km^{2})
  - Land: 1.34 sq mi (3.46 km^{2})
  - Water: 0.012 sq mi (0.03 km^{2})
- Elevation: 669 ft (204 m)

Population (2020)
  - Total: 51
  - Density: 38.35/sq mi (14.81/km^{2})
- Time zone: UTC-5 (Eastern (EST))
  - Summer (DST): UTC-4 (EDT)
- ZIP code(s): 49958
- Area code: 906
- GNIS feature ID: 1621187

Pelkie is an unincorporated community and census-designated place (CDP) in Baraga County in the U.S. state of Michigan. The CDP had a population of 51 at the 2020 census, which ranks it the second-least populated CDP in the state of Michigan. The community is located along the Sturgeon River in the northeast portion of Baraga Township.

== History ==
Pelkie was settled by French Canadians in about 1885, and was first known as "King's Landing" and was renamed Pelkie after an early settler, William Pelkie. Finns who settled there initially called the place Kyrö, after the place they came from in Finland; however, Kyro Location is now regarded as a distinct town from Pelkie. The name became Kuro after a railroad was built through the area. Because many Finns settled in the area, the Finnish name Pelkinen has been suggested as the original. However, the name actually was derived from a former French-Canadian settler. It was a station on the Mineral Range Railroad, and a post office was established on April 30, 1903. The Pelkie ZIP code 49958 serves areas in the north and northwest of Baraga Township in Baraga County, as well as an area of northeast Laird Township, southwest Elm River Township, and southern Portage Township in Houghton County.

== Demographics ==
Historical population
Census	Pop.	Note	%±
2020	51		—
U.S. Decennial Census

== Historic sites ==
The Historic Pelkie Grade School museum, constructed in 1909, is the only one-room schoolhouse still standing in Baraga County, and is listed on the State Register of Historic Sites on June 10, 1980. The building was used as a school until 1932, then as a town hall, and underwent restoration beginning in 1979. The museum also houses a horse-drawn school bus.

Today, Pelkie is home to the Baraga County Fair, which is held every year on the second weekend in August. The community's primary economic activity is dairy farming, and most of the milk is shipped to processors in Wisconsin.
