= Aura =

Aura most commonly refers to:

- Aura (paranormal), a purported field of luminous multi-colored radiation around a person or object
- Aura (symptom), experienced before a migraine or seizure
- Halo (religious iconography), glory, or aureola, a ring of light that surrounds a person in religious art
- Halo (optical phenomenon), glory (optical phenomenon) or corona (optical phenomenon), phenomena where a ring of light surrounds an object

Aura may also refer to:

== Places ==
=== Extraterrestrial ===
- 1488 Aura, a main-belt asteroid

=== Terrestrial ===
- Aura (woreda), administrative division in Ethiopia
- Aura, Finland, a municipality in Finland
- Aura, Michigan, a community in the US
- Aura, New Jersey, a community in the US
- Aura an der Saale, a municipality in Bavaria, Germany
- Aura Erbil, a mixed use city center in Iraqi Kurdistan
- Aura im Sinngrund, a community in Bavaria, Germany

=== Rivers ===
- Aura River (Finland), in southwestern Finland
- Aura (Norway), in Nesset Municipality, Norway
- Aura (Sinn), in Bavaria, Germany
- Aurá River, in Maranhão state, Brazil

=== Structures ===
- Aura (Toronto), a high-rise condominium building in Toronto, Ontario, Canada
- Aura Abbey, Benedictine monastery at Aura an der Saale, Bavaria, Germany
- SM Aura, a shopping mall in Bonifacio Global City, Taguig, Metro Manila, Philippines

== People ==
- Aura (Danish singer), Aura Dione (born 1988)
- Aura (South African singer), Aura Lewis (1947–2015)
- Aura K. Dunn (born 1971), American politician
- Aura Kiiskinen (1878–1968), Finnish politician
- Aura Mayari, stage name of Filipino-American drag queen Jay-R de Leon
- Aura Rostand (1899–1957), Nicaraguan poet
- Aura Salla (born 1984), Finnish politician
- Aura Twarowska (born 1967), Romanian operatic mezzo-soprano
- Au/Ra, Spanish pop singer Jamie Lou Stenzel (born 2002)

== Arts and entertainment ==
=== Fictional characters ===
- Aura (mythology), Greek goddess whose name means breeze
- Aura, one of Actaeon's dogs in Greek mythology
- Aura the Finnish Maiden, personification of Finland
- Aura (Seiken Densetsu), an elemental spirit in the Seiken Densetsu series
- Princess Aura, from Flash Gordon
- Aura (.hack), in the .hack franchise
- Aura, in Tiny Furniture

=== Literature ===
- Aura (novel), by Carlos Fuentes
- Aura: Maryūinkōga Saigo no Tatakai, a novel, adapted as a manga and anime film

=== Music ===
==== Albums ====
- Aura (Asia album), 2001, by Asia
- Aura (Yvonne Catterfeld album), 2006, by Yvonne Catterfeld
- Aura (CMX album), 1994, by CMX
- Aura (King Sunny Adé album), 1984, by King Sunny Adé
- Aura (Miles Davis album), 1989, by Miles Davis
- Aura (Ozuna album), 2018, by Ozuna
- Aura (The Alpha Conspiracy album), 2004, by The Alpha Conspiracy
- Aura (The Brave album), 2019, by The Brave
- Aura (The Mission album), 2001, by The Mission

==== Songs ====
- "Aura" (Lady Gaga song), 2013
- "Aura" (IV of Spades song), 2025
- "Aura", by Bruno Maderna
- "Aura", by Ozuna
- "Aura", by Dennis Lloyd
- "Aura", by Thomas Bergersen, 2011

==== Other uses in music ====
- Aura (English band), rock band
- Aura (Turkish band), Turkish girlband
- Aura (Magnus Lindberg), a 1994 orchestral composition

=== Other uses in arts, entertainment, and media ===
- Aura: Fate of the Ages, a 2004 computer game
- The Aura (film), a 2005 Argentine thriller

== Brands and enterprises ==
- Aura (cell phone), manufactured by Motorola
- Aura, a brand name of Bowers & Wilkins
- Saturn Aura, a midsize sedan manufactured by Saturn Corporation from 2007 to 2010
- Hyundai Aura, a subcompact sedan manufactured by Hyundai Motor Company since 2019
- Lada Aura, a compact sedan manufactured by AvtoVAZ since 2024

== Science and technology ==
- Aura (satellite), in the NASA Earth Observing System series
- Aura Graphics Architecture, which handles input events and windows in ChromeOS
- Autonomous robot architecture, a hybrid deliberative/reactive robot architecture

== Other uses ==
- Aura farming, a term describing repetitive actions done to cultivate an appearance of charisma
- Aura (musical instrument), invented by Johann Scheibler in 1816
- Aura cheese, a Finnish blue mold cheese
- Aura, a concept in The Work of Art in the Age of Mechanical Reproduction by Walter Benjamin

== See also ==
- AURA (disambiguation)
- Awra (disambiguation)
- Aurê–Aurá language, an extinct language from Brazil
- Aurra, a 1980s soul group
- Auras, Uttar Pradesh, town in India
- Awra Briguela, Filipino actor
