= Kiiskinen =

Kiiskinen is a Finnish surname. Notable people with the surname include:

- Aura Kiiskinen, Finnish politician
- Olli Kiiskinen, Finnish politician
- Heikki Kiiskinen, Finnish politician
- Jyrki Kiiskinen, Finnish writer
- Kalle Kiiskinen, Finnish curler
- Katja Kiiskinen (born 1983), Finnish curler and coach
- Tuomas Kiiskinen, Finnish ice hockey player
