= Arvon Township, Michigan =

- Civil township
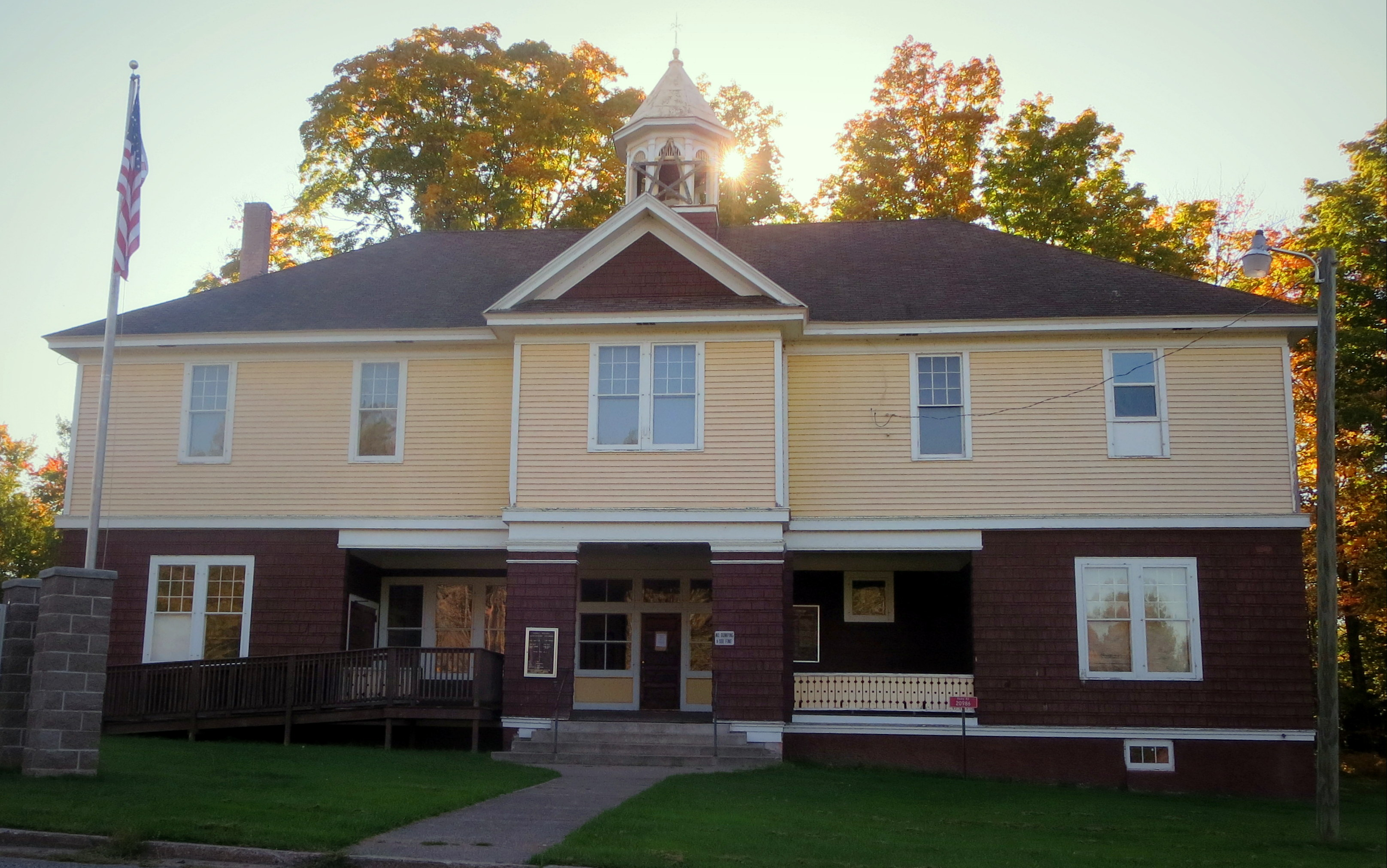
- The historic Arvon Township Hall

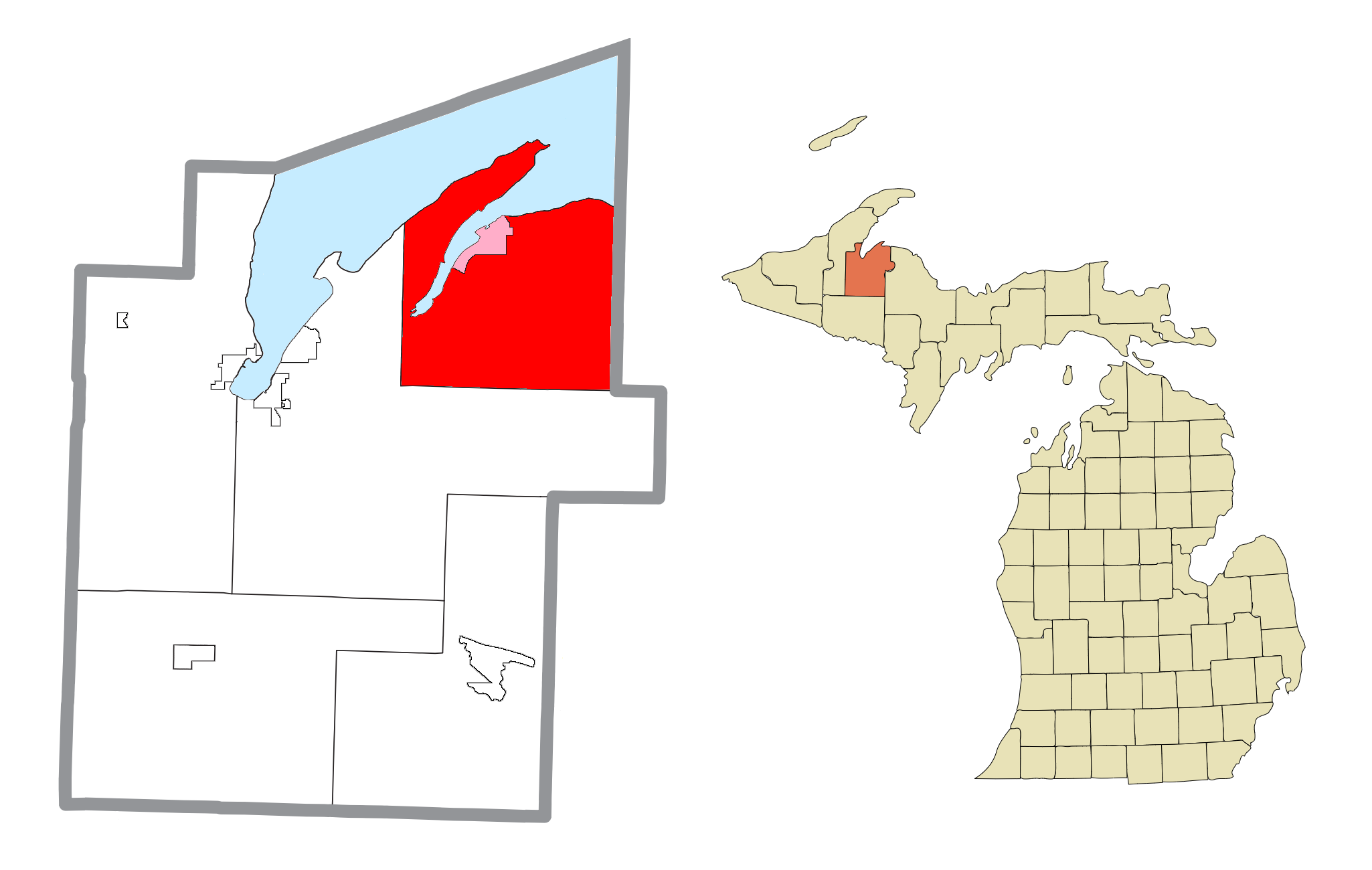
- Location within Baraga County (red) and the administered CDP of Skanee (pink)

- Location within the state of Michigan Location within the United States
- Coordinates: 46°50′45″N 88°10′21″W
- Country: United States
- State: Michigan
- County: Baraga
- Established: 1871

Government
  - Supervisor: Jay Fish
  - Clerk: Lisa Marinich

Area
  - Total: 131.35 sq mi (340.19 km^{2})
  - Land: 123.96 sq mi (321.05 km^{2})
  - Water: 7.39 sq mi (19.14 km^{2})
- Elevation: 768 ft (234 m)

Population (2020)
  - Total: 492
  - Density: 3.97/sq mi (1.53/km^{2})
- Time zone: UTC-5 (Eastern (EST))
  - Summer (DST): UTC-4 (EDT)
- ZIP codes: 49946 (L'Anse); 49962 (Skanee)
- FIPS code: 26-03660
- GNIS feature ID: 1625852
- Website: https://arvontownship.org/

Arvon Township (/ɑːrvɒn/ ARR-vahn) is a civil township of Baraga County in the U.S. state of Michigan. As of the 2020 census, the township population was 492. Despite its name, Mount Arvon, the highest point in Michigan, is located just south of the township, in neighboring L'Anse Township.

Arvon Township's name is derived from that of the district of Carnarvon in Wales, famous for its slate industry, because of the deposits of slate in the township which were once the site of a failed quarry operation.

== Communities ==
- Arvon, named after the township in 1872, began as a slate quarry village. A post office operated from June 8, 1874, until November 18, 1879, and again from May 18, 1882, until October 14, 1893.
- Aura is located at the base of the Point Abbaye peninsula on the northern side of Huron Bay.
- Huron Bay is a community located on Huron Bay a few miles southwest of Skanee. Here there is a convenience store and a tavern. Huron Bay was formerly the terminus of the Iron Range and Huron Bay Railroad, built to carry iron ore from Champion to Huron Bay. A post office was in operation from July 29, 1892, until January 31, 1894.
- McComb Corner is an unincorporated community in the township.
- Skanee is an unincorporated community and census-designated place (CDP) within the township.
- St. Cyr is an unincorporated community in the township, lying on Huron Bay.

== Geography ==
According to the United States Census Bureau, the township has a total area of 131.4 square miles (340.2 km^{2}), of which 124.0 square miles (321.1 km^{2}) is land and 7.4 square miles (19.1 km^{2}), or 5.62%, is water.

Arvon Township includes the Abbaye Peninsula, which projects into Lake Superior to form Huron Bay. The bay is long and narrow so its waters are significantly more protected than those of the open lake. Much of the shoreline, particularly around the tip of the peninsula at Point Abbaye, is rocky, although there are some stretches of sandy beach.

Much of the land in Arvon Township is forest with mixed deciduous and coniferous trees. There are also jack pine barrens and eastern arborvitae swamps. In settled areas, there are many wild apple trees which now form a significant food source for deer. Arvon Township has a number of rivers, including the Huron River, which flow into Lake Superior. Because of these factors, the primary economic activities in Arvon Township are related to logging or tourism, particularly hunting and fishing.

== Demographics ==
As of the census of 2000, there were 482 people, 222 households, and 150 families residing in the township. The population density was 3.9 inhabitants per square mile (1.5/km^{2}). There were 623 housing units at an average density of 5.0 per square mile (1.9/km^{2}). The racial makeup of the township was 93.36% White, 3.11% Native American, 0.41% Asian, and 3.11% from two or more races. Among its population, 17.8% were of Swedish, 16.3% German, 14.8% Finnish, 7.8% French, 7.5% Irish and 6.6% Norwegian ancestry. By 2020, its population was 492.

In 2000, the median income for a household in the township was $31,705, and the median income for a family was $39,545. Males had a median income of $26,786 versus $22,292 for females. The per capita income for the township was $19,800. About 3.8% of families and 8.0% of the population were below the poverty line, including 18.9% of those under age 18 and 6.8% of those age 65 or over. The 2021 census estimates determined its median household income was $52,500.
