= Ekkehard of Aura =

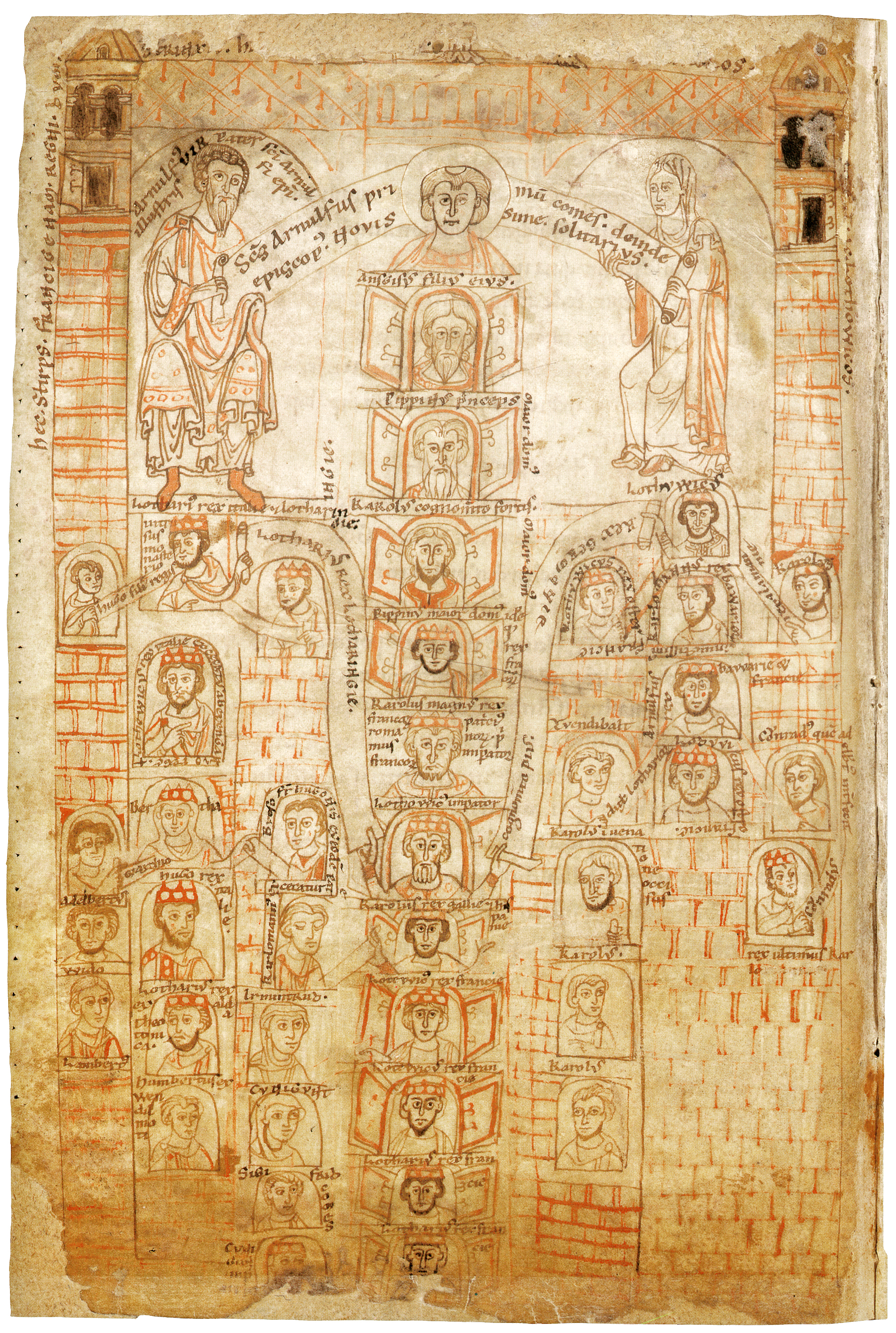
Genealogical tree of the Carolingians, Chronicon Universale by Ekkehard of Aura.

Ekkehard of Aura (Latin: Ekkehardus Uraugiensis; born c. 1080, died 20 February 1126) was the first abbot of Aura from 1108. The monastery was founded by Bishop Otto of Bamberg on the Franconian Saale river, near Bad Kissingen, Bavaria. It is thought that Ekkehard was a member of the Bavarian aristocracy.

A Benedictine monk and chronicler, he made updates to the World Chronicle (Chronicon universale) of Frutolf of Michelsberg, adding important German history between 1098 and 1125 during the reign of Emperor Henry V, in which he sided strongly with the papacy in the Investiture Controversy. He was a participant in the Crusade of 1101 (Lerner, 1989), and provided important source material for the Rhineland massacres of Jews and for the First Crusade.

While the Crusade of 1101 was considered a failure, Ekkehard did manage to journey to Jerusalem, although his stay in the Holy City was only brief. He returned from the Holy Land via Rome, before returning to Germany, where he became a monk at the abbey of Tegernsee in 1102/03 before moving to Michaelsberg abbey near Bamberg, although these claims have been contested. It is also thought that Ekkehard spent some time in Würzburg, due to the dedication he included when writing the Life of St Burchard. It was here that Ekkehard met Otto of Bamberg, who would later go on to found the monastery of Aura and install Ekkehard as its first abbot. Aura was founded to be part of the Hirsau network of monasteries, which were hugely influential nodes in a network of reform-minded monasteries.
