= Aura Abbey =

- Kloster Aura
- Interactive map of Aura Abbey

Monastery information
- Order: Benedictines
- Established: 1108
- Disestablished: 1564
- Dedication: Saint Lawrence; Pope Gregory I
- Diocese: Diocese of Würzburg

People
- Founder: Bishop Otto of Bamberg

Architecture
- Style: Romanesque

Site
- Location: Aura an der Saale, Bavaria
- Country: Germany
- Coordinates: 50°10′02″N 10°00′27″E

Aura Abbey (Kloster or Abtei Aura) was a house of the Benedictine Order located at Aura an der Saale in Bavaria in the Diocese of Würzburg.

== History ==
Built on the site of an earlier castle, and dedicated to Saints Laurence and Gregory, it was founded by Bishop Otto of Bamberg between about 1108 and 1113; the foundation charter is dated 1122. The new foundation was settled by monks from Hirsau Abbey. The first abbot was Ekkehard of Aura, a monk from Bamberg, famous as the continuer of the Weltchronik of Frutolf of Michelsberg. The Vögte were the Counts of Henneberg, although later the Bishop of Würzburg seems to have acquired some authority here.

In 1469 the abbey joined the Bursfelde Congregation, but suffered repeated disasters in the 16th century, including almost complete destruction by a rioting mob in 1525, and after rebuilding, a second destruction in 1553 during the second campaign of Albert Alcibiades, Margrave of Brandenburg-Kulmbach (the Markgräflerkrieg). It was finally dissolved in 1564 and its assets transferred to the exchequer of the Diocese of Würzburg.

An attempt at a revival was started in 1617 by Prince-Bishop Gottfried von Aschhausen, but the project was abandoned at his death in 1622, leaving some impressive remains of the unfinished church.

Very little is left of the original monastery, except for the former abbey church of St. Laurence, which is still a significant Romanesque building, although with considerable alterations and additions from the 17th and 18th centuries.
