= Distributed architecture for mobile navigation =

The Distributed architecture for mobile navigation (DAMN) is a mobile robot architecture developed by Julio K. Rosenblatt at Carnegie Mellon University. DAMN consists of a collection of independently operating behaviors such as "go-to-goal" and "avoid obstacle", and an arbiter. The arbiter generates a set of feasible action possibilities for the robot over a short time horizon, and the behaviours vote on (i.e. express utility for) these candidate actions. Votes may be weighted by a mode manager. The Pareto optimal action is then sent to the vehicle controller. One method of obtaining votes is for behaviours to asynchronously update a utility map over the configuration space of the robot. The arbiter then overlays paths resulting from action candidates onto the map, and samples utilities along the paths. This approach is known as utility fusion. In DAMN, the decision-making process is distributed and asynchronous, without the need for an hierarchical structure.

== See also ==
- Three-layer architecture
- Servo, subsumption, and symbolic (SSS) architecture
- ATLANTIS architecture
- Autonomous robot architecture (AuRA)
