= Iron Range and Huron Bay Railroad =

1890s unused railroad in Michigan, US

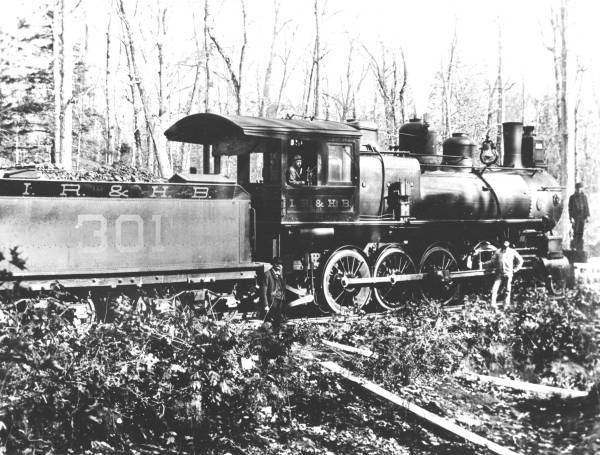
One of the two 4-8-0 locomotives owned by the IR&HB. They were later sold to the Algoma Central Railway.

The Iron Range & Huron Bay Railroad (IR&HB) is a defunct railroad constructed to haul iron ore in Michigan's Upper Peninsula during the 1890s. Financial and engineering problems prevented the railroad's operation; it remains an unusual example of a railroad which was completed but never used.

== Background ==
Rich iron ore deposits were first discovered in the Upper Peninsula in the 1840s, and remain a significant source of wealth for the state. By the 1890s Michigan was the largest supplier of iron ore in the United States. Railroads would haul ore from the mines to great ore docks on the Great Lakes in places such as Escanaba and Marquette, where it would be loaded on ore freighters and transported to the rest of the country. The Huron Mountains west of Marquette were known to be rich in ore deposits, particularly around Lake Michigamme (near Michigamme, Michigan), and were believed to contain marble, granite, silver, gold, lead, graphite, asbestos, and silica.

== History ==
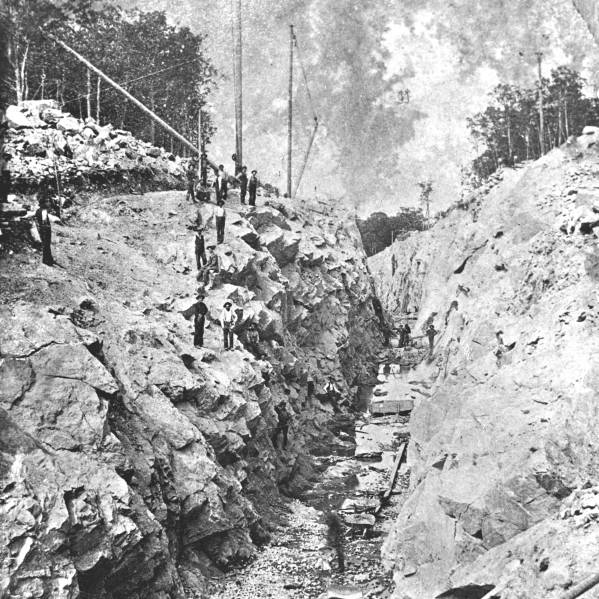
The IR&HB faced hilly country throughout; some grades reached 5–8%.

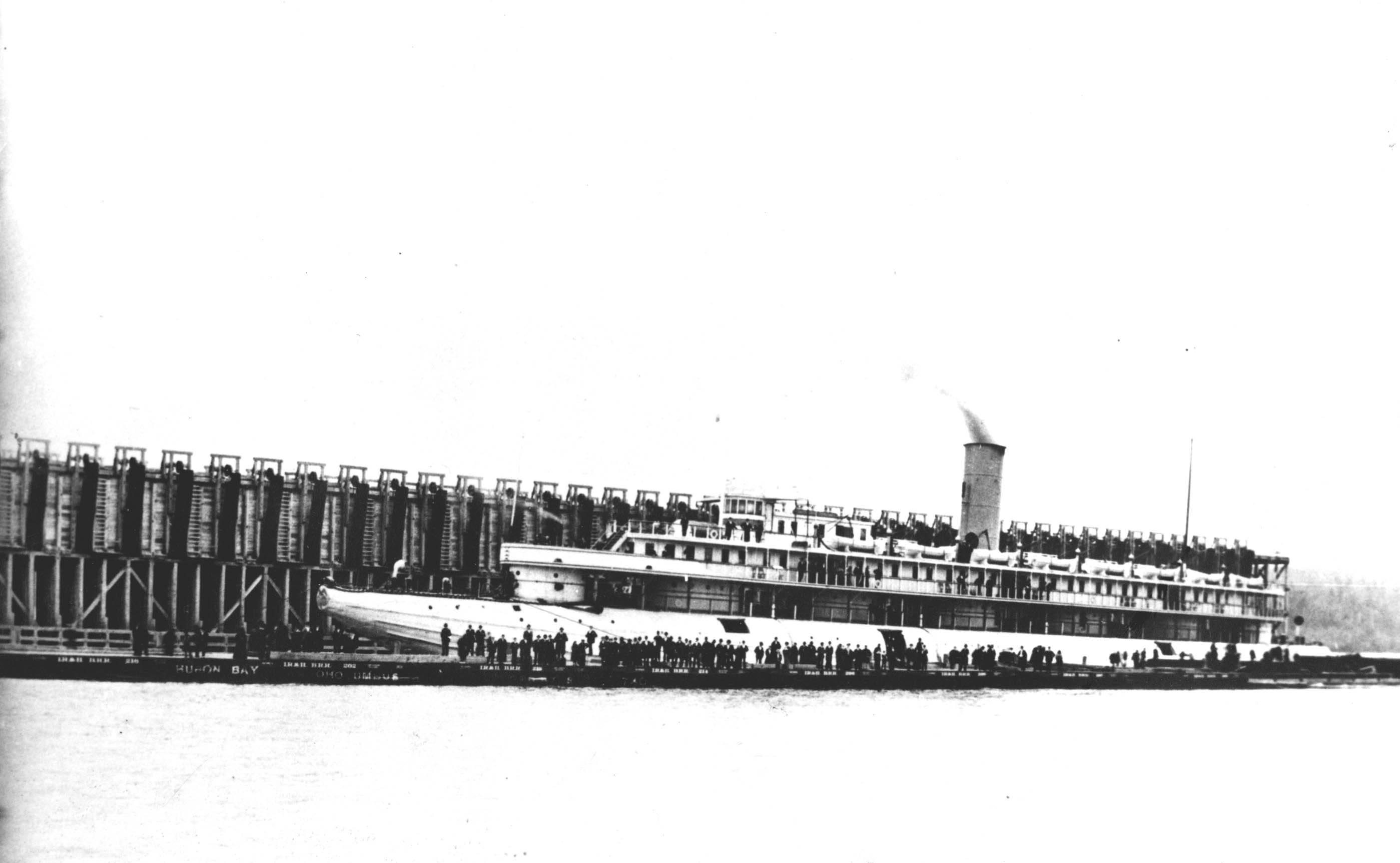
The ore dock at Skanee, Michigan. The steamer Christopher Columbus is in the foreground.

The IR&HB was formed on June 27, 1890, by seven businessmen, all from Michigan's Lower Peninsula and all but one from Detroit. Milo H. Davis, also of Detroit, was engaged as chief engineer.

The company proposed to construct a line from Champion, near the Lake Michigamme ore fields, to a new ore dock on Huron Bay (in Arvon Township), which connected to Lake Superior. From there the ore would be shipped by freighter through the Soo Locks.

=== Construction ===
The terrain for the line proved forbidding. The country was hilly and broken; grading the roadbed proved an expensive and intensive activity. By June 1891 an initial workforce of 500 men had swelled to 1,500, which strained the local transportation network. The builder, Wallace Dingman of Battle Creek, Michigan, ran out of money in August and abandoned work, leaving the IR&HB with unpaid bills and swamping Marquette County's limited poor relief resources. New contractors were hired and the grading was finally finished in the summer of 1892, reportedly at the cost of $400,000–well above the $265,000 budgeted for the project. One major obstacle was a 1,000-foot (305 m) cut near Mount Arvon, from which 40,000 cubic yards (31,000 m^{3}) of rock were removed. The rails were laid between July and November 1892.

The ore dock was built on the shores of Huron Bay for $170,000 under the supervision of John Munro, Jr. It measured 1,000 feet (305 m) in length and required 2,000,000 board feet (4,719 m^{3}) of lumber. A sawmill was constructed to process the vast amounts of timber necessary for the project.

=== Failure ===
Although the IR&HB completed the 42-mile (68 km) line between Champion and Huron Bay and purchased two 4-8-0 "Mastodon" steam locomotives from the Brooks Locomotive Works, no trains were ever operated. Reference Barnett implies 35 miles in his calculations; Dompier claims 42 miles, as does the Times article cited below. The completion of the line coincided with the Panic of 1893, which reduced the demand for iron ore.

Additionally, the ore mines around Lake Michigamme – which the IR&HB had intended to serve – began to play out. There were richer mines in Ishpeming to the east, but the IR&HB lacked the wherewithal to construct such a line, which would have spanned 15 to 20 miles (24 to 32 km). In places, the IR&HB line exceeded a grade of 5%, which would have made the haulage of freight difficult. For a standard-gauge non-rack rail railroad like the IR&HB, 3% was "excessive" and anything over 4.5% was unheard of. Some sources claim the IR&HB exceeded 8% in places.

A test run was done with one of the newly delivered locomotives. A number of internet sources cite differing times, lengths of travel, and the outcome. A fair use quote of the 2 M ride page from Sam Beck, a railroad watchman: “As the last eleven miles of the road were downgrade, we decided the uphill run from Huron Bay would be a good test. I was in the cab with the engineer and we had proceeded just a short distance up the grade when the railroad gave way and we went into a ditch.” “From that moment on, the Iron Range and Huron Bay Railroad ceased to exist as a railroad!” Several local historians assert that this ride never happened and was just a story.

By 1893 the IR&HB found itself in serious financial difficulties. In 1890 it had begun with $1,400,000 in capital through an initial stock issue coupled with the sale of bonds. Additional bonds worth $600,000 were sold to cover construction overruns and keep the railroad afloat, but its debts mounted.

Finally, in 1900, the company's owners sold it outright to the Detroit Construction Company (Frank C. Andrews, John Winter, and Dr. Lau) for $110,000.

== Legacy ==
Following the sale, the Detroit Construction Company dismantled the entire line. The 67 pounds per yard rails were re-used in various interurban schemes in the Lower Peninsula, including the Grand Rapids, Holland and Lake Michigan Rapid Railway and the Detroit, Lake Orion and Flint Railway.

The two locomotives were sold for $14,000 to Francis Clergue of the Algoma Central Railway. A track was built to the lighter at the dock and the engines, under their own steam were loaded onto the tugboat Daniel L. Hebard. The great ore dock was dismantled and shipped to Detroit.

Milo H. Davis, the chief engineer, was reported (by a few newspaper articles) to have fled to Mexico to escape allegations of fraud. But no one knows that for sure. According to the New York Times, the state took possession of the right-of-way and other property as compensation for unpaid taxes; Marquette County purchased the section within its borders in 1902 for $1,600 and converted it into a roadway.

In 1905 the Lake Superior Southern Railway proposed to construct a new line from Huron Bay to Madison, Wisconsin; the company failed to attract financing and dissolved in 1908.

The "Rock Cut" midway along the line has become a local tourist attraction. Various out-of-state news sources misquote its 1,300 ft long length and 60-foot depth. Source - The Negaugnee Iron Herald, August 5, 1892.

Local historians are investigating the possibility of linking a predecessor operation (only the first mile or so) to the IR&HB Railroad, Huron Bay Terminus Railway. This highly detailed page does document a large part of the IR&HB right-of-way and shows many details of the local slate mining industry that once existed in that era.
