= Aura, Michigan =

- Unincorporated community
- Location within the state of Michigan
- Coordinates: 46°51′46″N 88°19′11″W
- Country: United States
- State: Michigan
- County: Baraga
- Township: Arvon
- Settled: 1914
- Elevation: 827 ft (252 m)
- Time zone: UTC-5 (Eastern (EST))
  - Summer (DST): UTC-4 (EDT)
- ZIP code: 49946
- Area code: 906
- GNIS feature ID: 620346

Aura is a small unincorporated community in Arvon Township of Baraga County in the U.S. state of Michigan. The area is approximately 12 miles (19 km) northeast of L'Anse and four miles (6 km) east of Pequaming.

== History ==
In the 1870s, the land on the Abbaye Peninsula was still mostly the property of the Chippewa Native Americans. In 1877, the Hebard and Thurberg Lumber Company leased the peninsula from the chief, David King. They built a large steam-powered sawmill the following year and established sixteen lumber camps. The principal Chippewa village, known as Pe-qua-qua-wa-ming, is now Pequaming. The mill produced up to 25 million board feet of lumber annually and employed as many as 650 men. After the death of King, his heirs sold the entire peninsula to Charles Hebard and his company. The land and the sawmill were later owned by Henry Ford.

Towards the end of the Copper Country Strike of 1913-1914 that affected mining interests throughout the Copper Country region of Michigan, Hebard began selling off harvested lands in the middle of the Abbaye peninsula on reasonable terms, of $300 for 40 acres (160,000 m^{2}) with only a small cash downpayment to stake a claim. Many jobless Finnish miners moved there to begin farming the land. The first settlers in June 1914 were Tobias Hiltunen and his family, who purchased Camp Number 3 and which had buildings in habitable condition. Other Finnish families arrived later that summer. They named the place Aura (Finnish: "Plow"), because someone had found an old plow on the land, apparently left by loggers.

A post office was opened December 19, 1921, and the first postmaster was Hilda Mytty. It was discontinued on February 1, 1974, and was a CPO until February 20, 1982.

== Geography ==
Situated on the Abbaye Peninsula between Keweenaw Bay and Huron Bay, this small farming settlement consisted of approximately fifteen square miles in both Arvon and L'Anse townships. Historically, the rich clay loam has been most suitable for potatoes, hay, wheat, oats, and other grains, although active farming has declined over the years.
