= ATLANTIS architecture =

The A Three-Layer Architecture for Navigating Through Intricate Situations (ATLANTIS) is a hybrid reactive/deliberative robot architecture developed by Erann Gat at the Jet Propulsion Laboratory.

== See also ==
- Three-layer architecture
- Servo, subsumption, and symbolic (SSS) architecture
- Distributed architecture for mobile navigation (DAMN)
- Autonomous robot architecture (AuRA)
