= Skanee, Michigan =

- Census-designated place (CDP) & unincorporated community
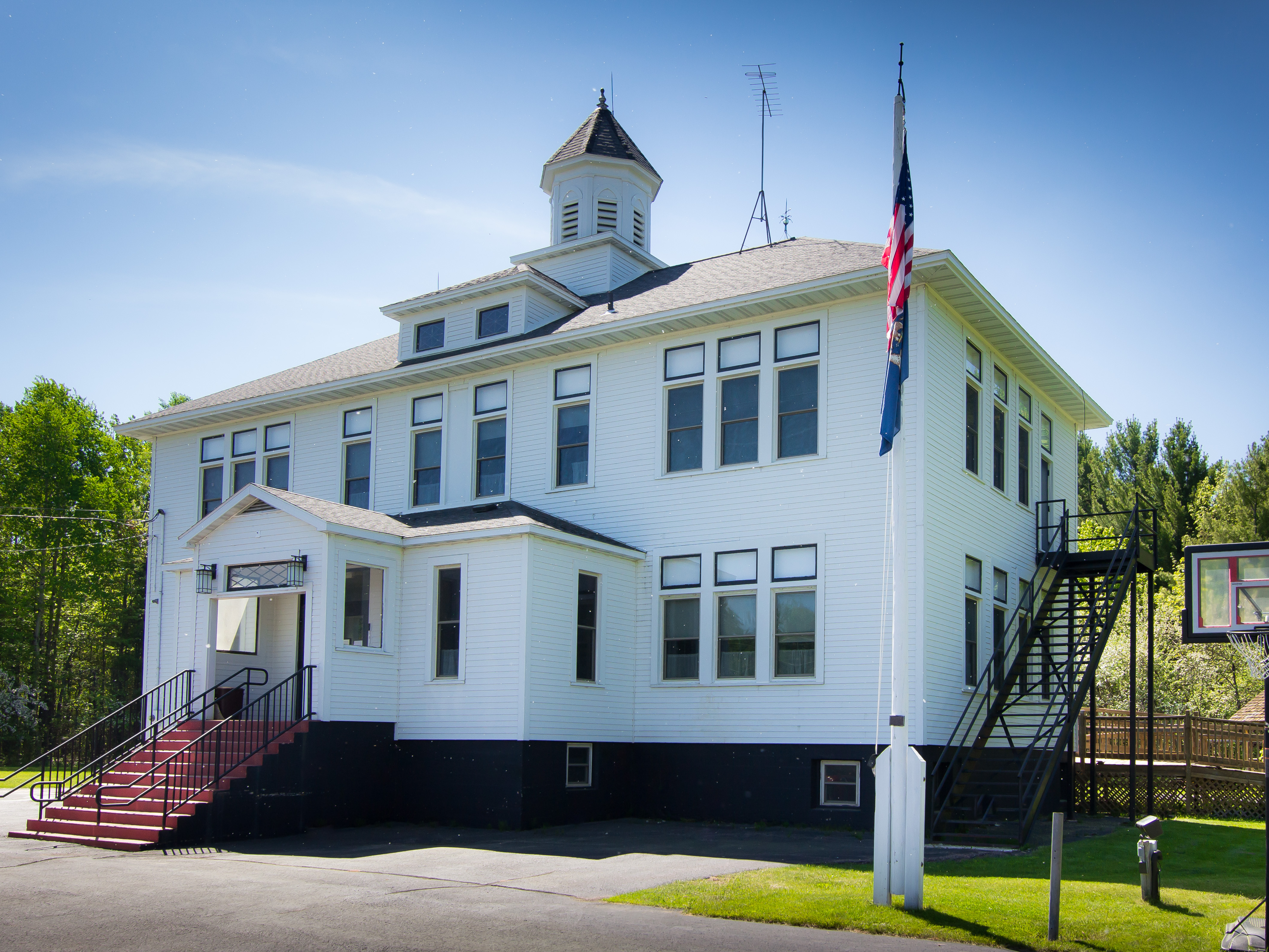
- This historic Skanee School

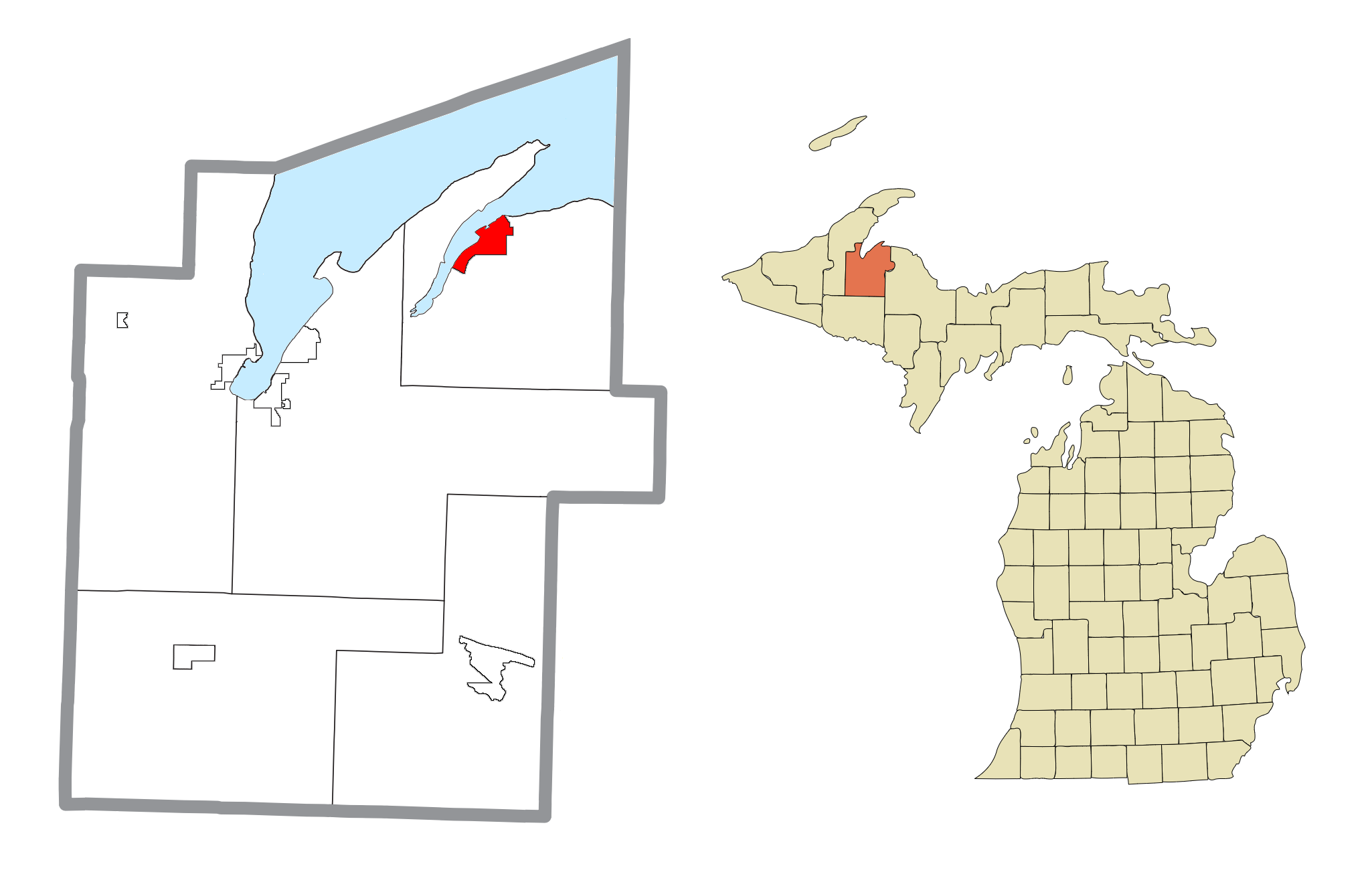
- Location within Baraga County

- Location within the state of Michigan Location within the United States
- Coordinates: 46°52′35″N 88°12′51″W
- Country: United States
- State: Michigan
- County: Baraga
- Township: Arvon
- Settled: 1870

Area
  - Total: 4.83 sq mi (12.5 km^{2})
  - Land: 4.73 sq mi (12.3 km^{2})
  - Water: 0.10 sq mi (0.26 km^{2})
- Elevation: 745 ft (227 m)

Population (2020)
  - Total: 102
  - Density: 21.56/sq mi (8.32/km^{2})
- Time zone: UTC-5 (Eastern (EST))
  - Summer (DST): UTC-4 (EDT)
- ZIP code(s): 49962
- Area code: 906
- GNIS feature ID: 638047

Skanee is an unincorporated community and census-designated place (CDP) in Baraga County in the U.S. state of Michigan. The CDP had a population of 102 at the 2020 census. Skanee is located in Arvon Township on the shore of Huron Bay, a bay of Lake Superior.

As an unincorporated community, Skanee has no legal autonomy of its own, however it does have its own post office with the 49962 ZIP Code. The community is home to the historic Arvon Township Hall.

== History ==
Skanee was established in 1870 when Captain Walfred Been sailed into Huron Bay during a storm, and settled in the area. Been named the settlement after Skåne in Sweden, his home province.

For the 2020 census, Skanee was included as a newly-listed census-designated place.

== Geography ==
According to the U.S. Census Bureau, the Skanee CDP has a total area of 4.83 square miles (12.51 km^{2}), of which 4.73 square miles (12.25 km^{2}) is land and 0.10 square miles (0.26 km^{2}) (2.1%) is water.

Skanee is located in Arvon Township, in northeastern Baraga County. The community is located at the base of the Huron Mountains, a relatively small range shared between Baraga and Marquette counties. About 8.5 miles (13.7 km) southeast of Skanee is Mount Arvon, which at 1,979 feet (603 m), is the highest point in Michigan. The community is located on the shore of Huron Bay, a bay of Lake Superior.

== Demographics ==
Historical population
Census	Pop.	Note	%±
2020	102		—
U.S. Decennial Census

== Education ==
Skanee is zoned within the Arvon Township School District. The district operates the K-8 Skanee School, while high school students attend school in L'Anse.

== Images ==
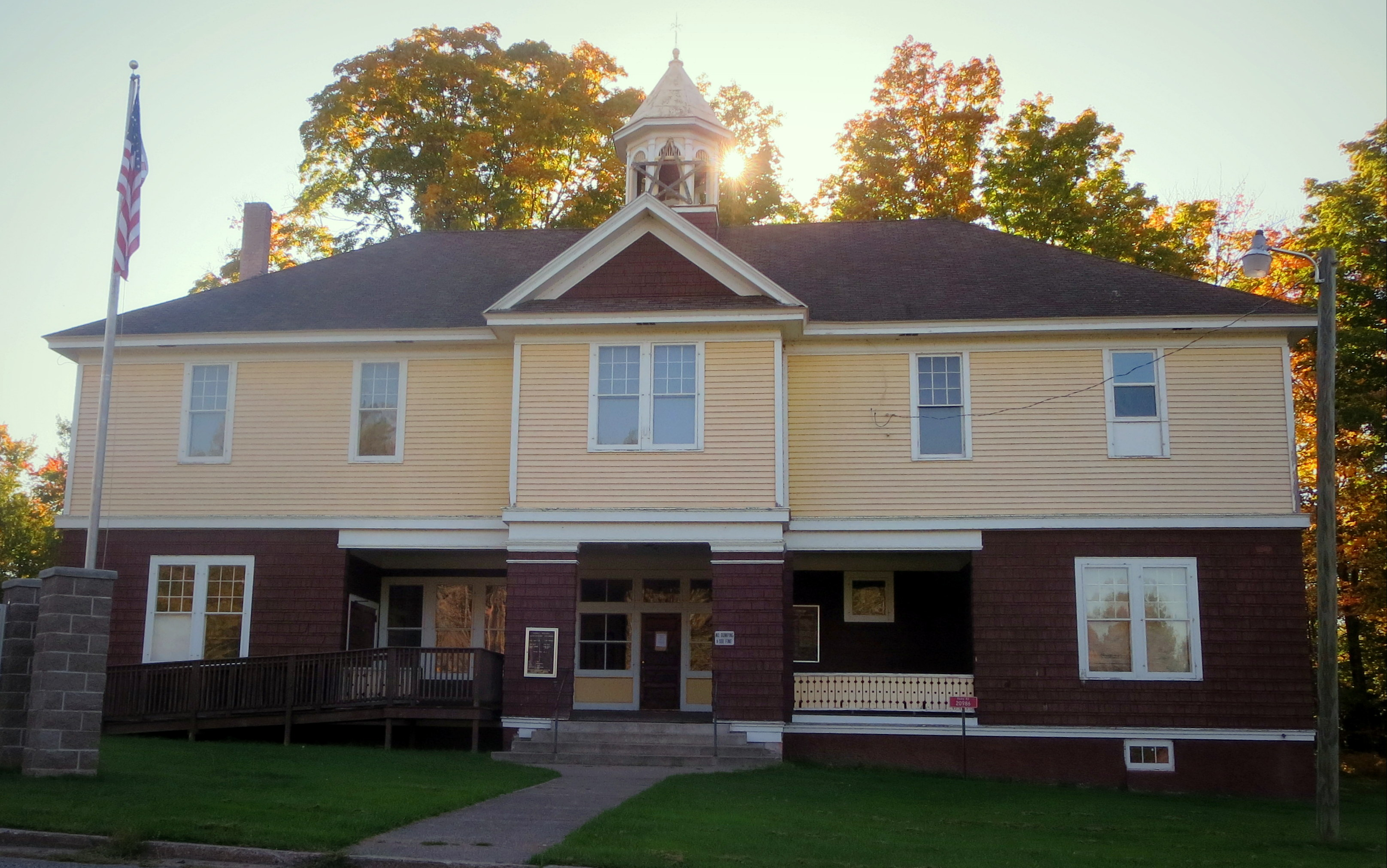
Arvon Township Hall

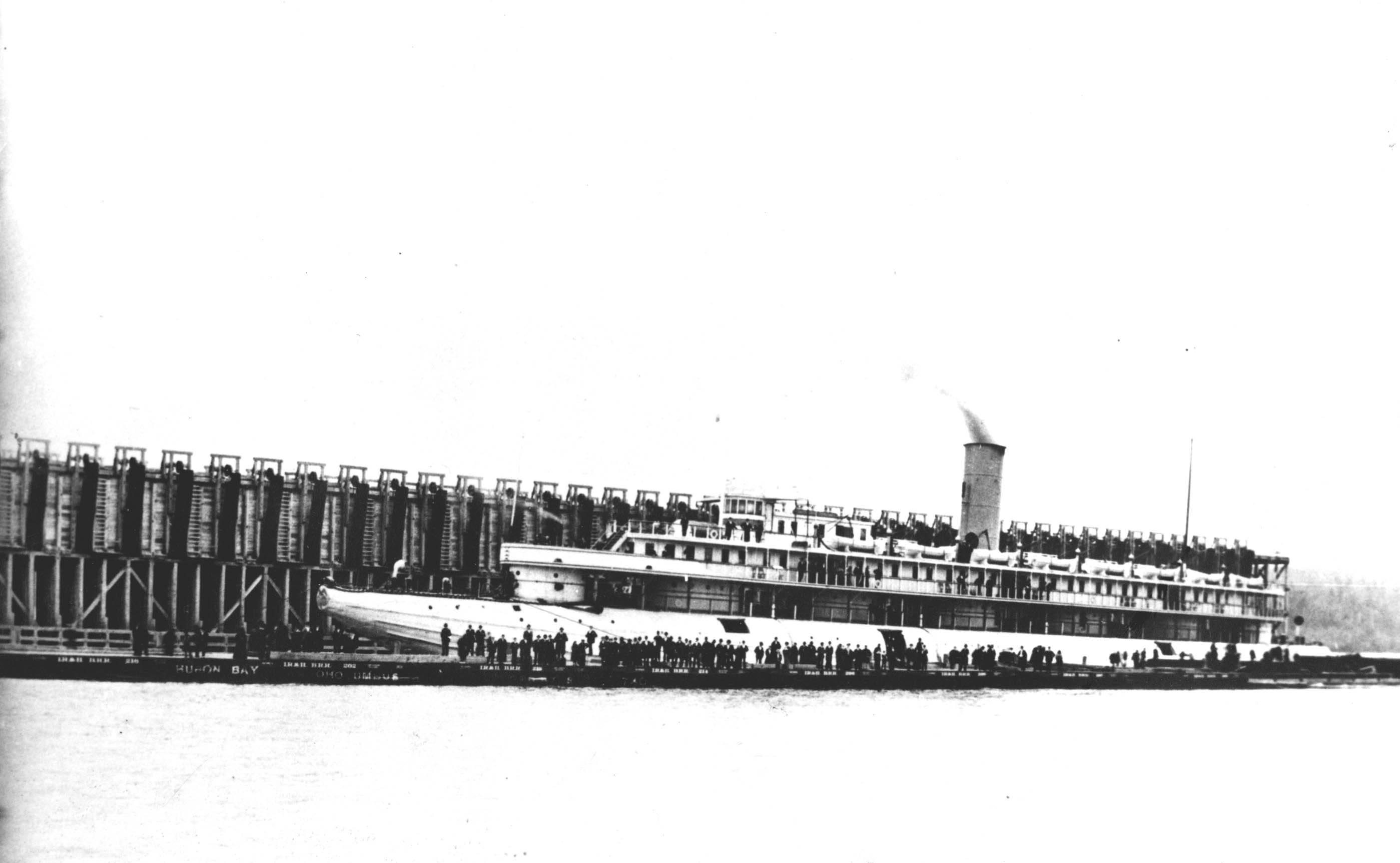
The Iron Range and Huron Bay Railroad ore dock in Skanee
