= AURA =

AURA may refer to:

- Association of Universities for Research in Astronomy
- Atlas of UTR Regulatory Activity
- AURA (United Artists for African Rap), a collective of hip hop artists
- Automated User-Centered Reasoning and Acquisition System, sponsored by Vulcan Inc.
- DRDO AURA, an unmanned combat air vehicle being developed by India
- Auvergne-Rhône-Alpes, an administrative region of France

== See also ==
- Aura (disambiguation)
