= Three-layer architecture =

The Three-Layer Architecture is a hybrid reactive/deliberative robot architecture developed by R. James Firby that consists of three layers: a reactive feedback control mechanism, a reactive plan execution mechanism, and a mechanism for performing time-consuming deliberative computations.

== See also ==
- ATLANTIS architecture
- Servo, subsumption, and symbolic (SSS) architecture
- Distributed architecture for mobile navigation (DAMN)
- Autonomous robot architecture (AuRA)
