= Aura (English band) =

British psychedelic rock band

Aura (stylised as AurA) was a rock band formed in April 2007 in Worcestershire, England. The line up consisted of Dave Small (Vocals), Jamie Guggenheim (Guitar), Blake Probert (Bass), and Jesse Lee Garcia (Drums/percussion).

== Background ==
Aura performed and wrote their own original material written by main songwriter Dave Small (Vocals) with input from various other band members, they also performed songs by artists who had inspired and influenced them in their band style of 1960s/1970s classic rock and blues.

Achievements included sharing the bill with Walter Trout, Wishbone Ash, Hayseed Dixie and Rose Hill Drive; While supporting Stan Webb's Chicken Shack at Stourbridge Rock Café in 2000 they were spotted by a promoter who wanted a young act to support Status Quo. They played before 5,000 people at an open-air concert at Dudley Castle in 2007. They also toured Holland, Germany, Belgium and France on a band exchange scheme organised by the Worcestershire Arts Trust. They also performed on stage with Robert Plant at a tribute concert to honour the late Chicken Shack/Honeydrippers drummer Keith (Bev) Smith in September 2007. In March 2008 they were asked to perform as part of the support acts for Velvet Revolver during the Wolverhampton & Birmingham legs of their Rock n' Roll As It Should Be tour with Pearl Aday adopted daughter of Meatloaf.

They were booked to appear at the Albert Hall and Download Festival 2008; But before these last two events on 28 March 2008 the band officially announced they were splitting up.

== BBC sessions ==
AurA were featured many times on BBC Introducing with Andrew Marston in 2007 including a live session on BBC Introducing, and in 2008 as well as on BBC Introducing WM with Brett Birks and Louise Brierley, being interviewed and playing live in session.

== Studio recordings ==
Their debut five-track EP Freedom was recorded with music guru Gavin Monaghan at his Magic Garden Studios Wolverhampton (The Editors, Ocean Colour Scene Scott Matthews, The Twang).

== Post break-up activity ==
After the breakup in 2008 Jamie Guggenheim, Jesse Lee Garcia and Blake Probert formed the band Ananukis and lead singer and principle songwriter Dave Small after a short spell playing drums and percussion and recording with Gwyn Ashton on his 'Two-Man Blues Army' album project. then formed the band Naked Remedy in early 2009 with Tom Callinswood, Nav Sahota and Jack Ryland-Smith.
