= Abbaye Peninsula =

Peninsula in Baraga County, Michigan

- Peninsula
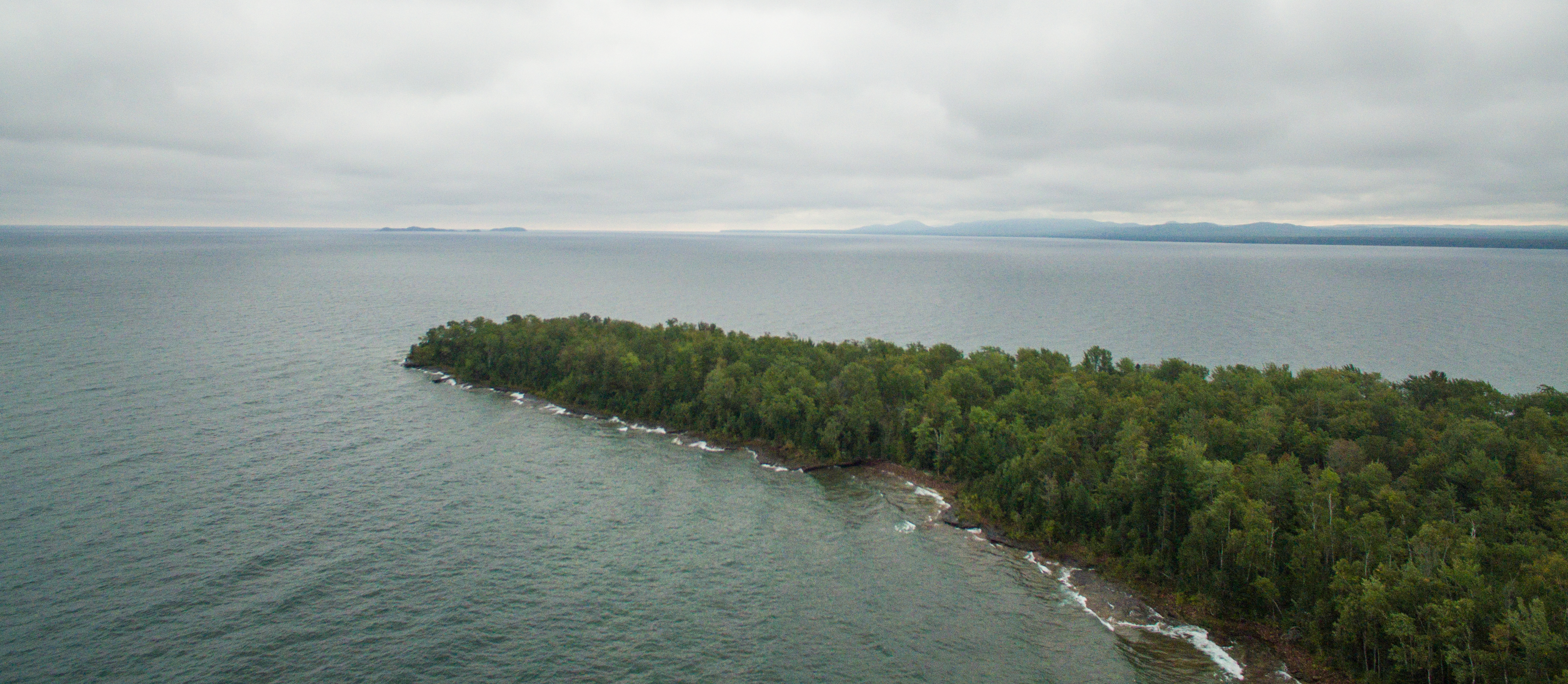
- Point Abbaye, at the tip of the Abbaye Peninsula, with the Huron Mountains in the background

- Location within Michigan
- Coordinates: 46°54′30″N 88°14′30″W
- Location: Baraga County, Michigan, Upper Peninsula of Michigan, United States
- Water bodies: Keweenaw Bay, Huron Bay, Lake Superior

Dimensions
  - Length: 12.3 miles (19.8 km)

The Abbaye Peninsula (/əˈbaɪ/ uh-BYE) is a 12.3-mile-long (19.8 km) peninsula located within Baraga County on the northern shore of the Upper Peninsula within the U.S. state of Michigan. It is bounded by Keweenaw Bay on the west and Huron Bay on the east.

== Description ==
The peninsula remained undisturbed in the hands of the Chippewa until 1877, when the Hebard and Thurberg Lumber Company leased the peninsula from a local clan leader and his band. Timbering operations rapidly commenced, with the old growth forests of the peninsula axed down and carried to the sawmills at Pequaming. Efforts, starting in 1914, to turn the cut-over real estate into arable farmland were not successful. The post office at Aura, Michigan, which opened in 1921, was downgraded to a CPO in 1974 and closed entirely in 1982.

Today, the second-growth forests of the Abbaye Peninsula are managed for the production of pulpwood. The thickly wooded peninsula is almost uninhabited, with no paved roads offering access to any point within the rocky promontory. Gravel roads allow extraction of pulp logs; the graded pathways can be driven by four-wheel-drive vehicles and, in winter, by snowmobiles. Parcels of land within the peninsula are located within the Copper Country State Forest.

The rare visitor to the Abbaye Peninsula enters a boreal ecosystem dominated by Lake Superior, which surrounds Point Abbaye, the promontory's northeastern tip. The Huron Island Light flashes a warning to mariners from a rocky freshwater archipelago located beyond the end of the peninsula. Peninsula boaters are able to fish for lake trout.
