= Ore dock =

Transportation construction

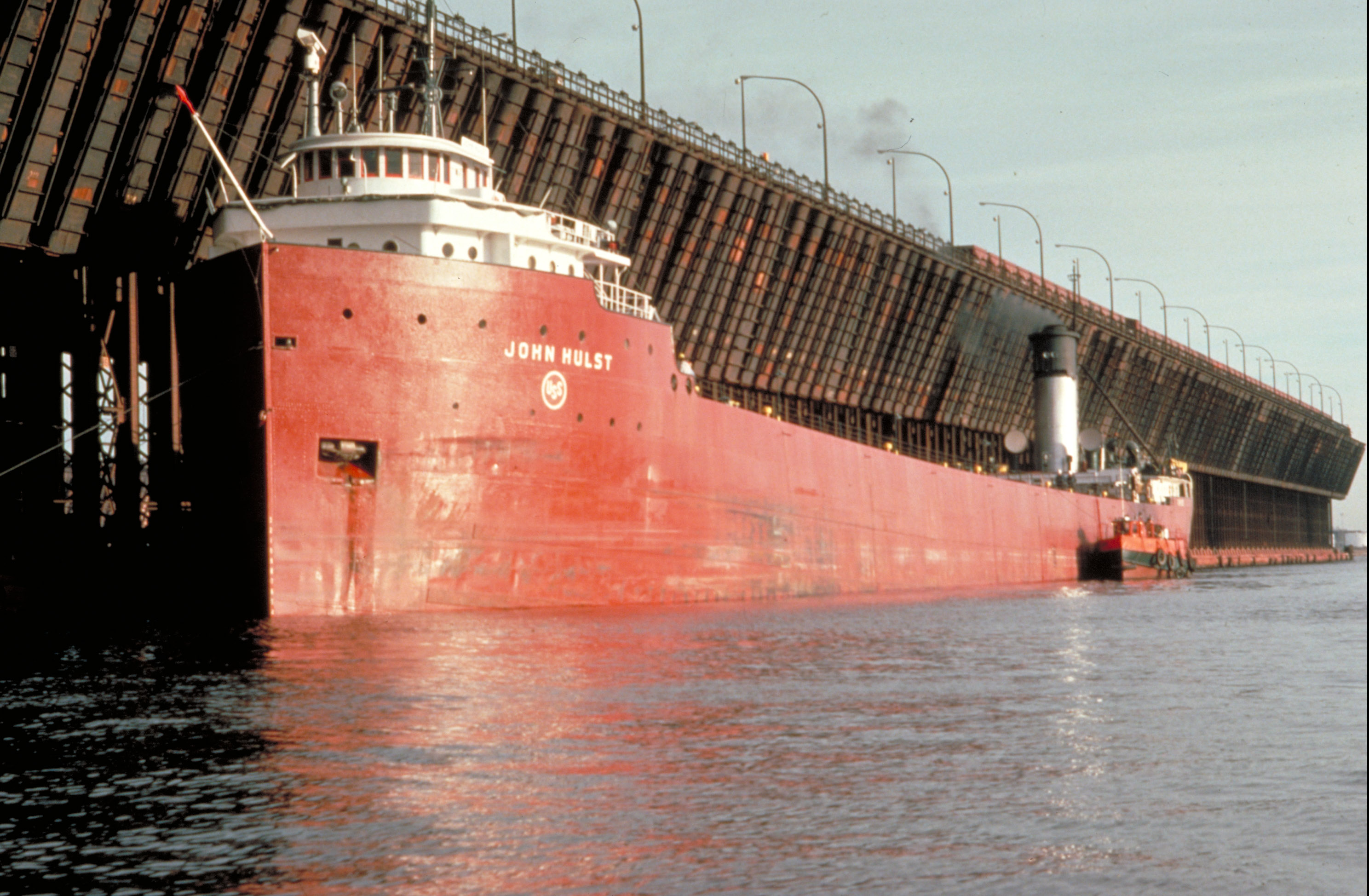
Laker at dock in Duluth, Minnesota showing scale

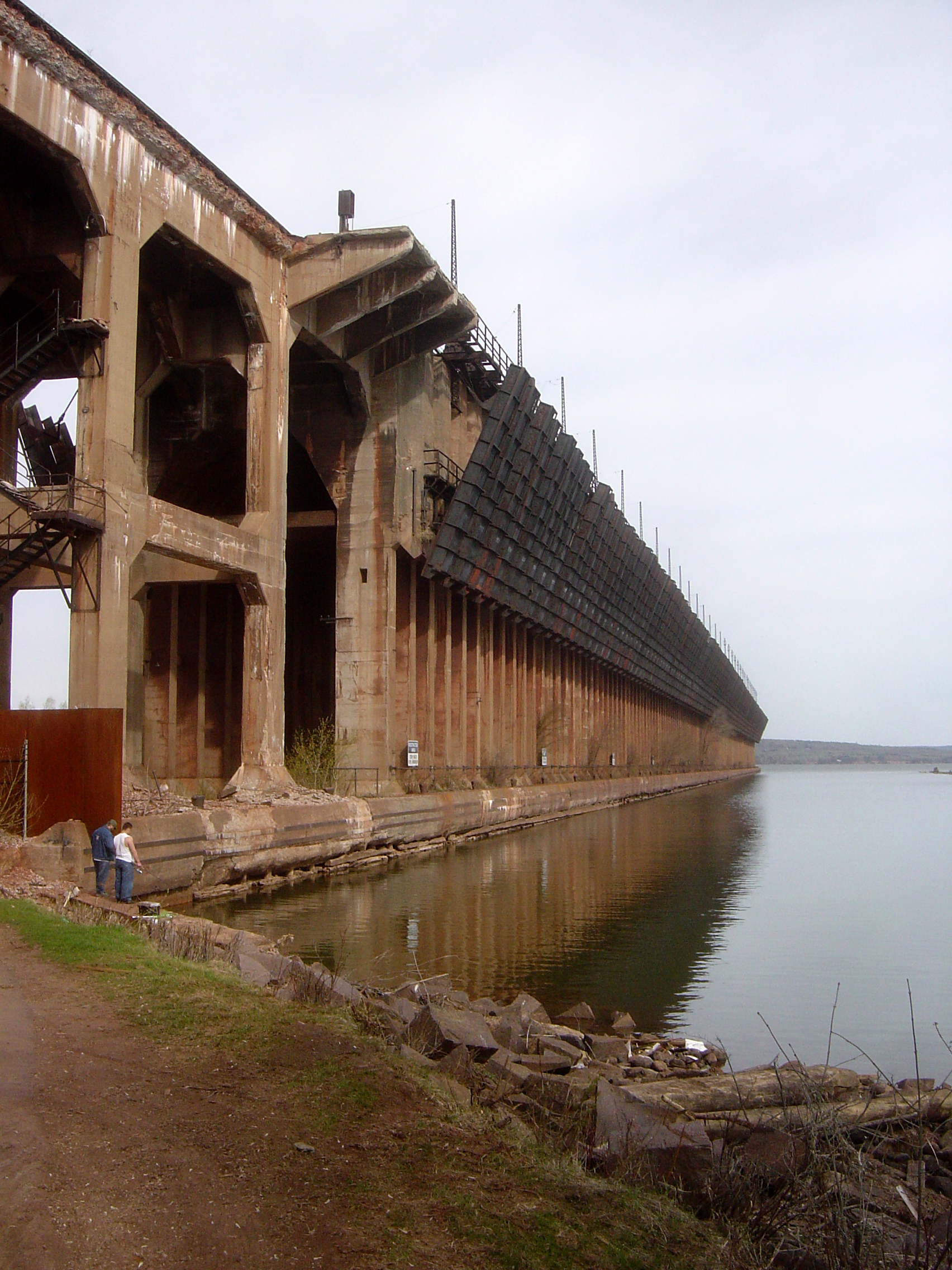
The Wisconsin Central Railway (later Soo Line) ore dock in Ashland, Wisconsin 1,800 ft (550 m) long, b. 1916

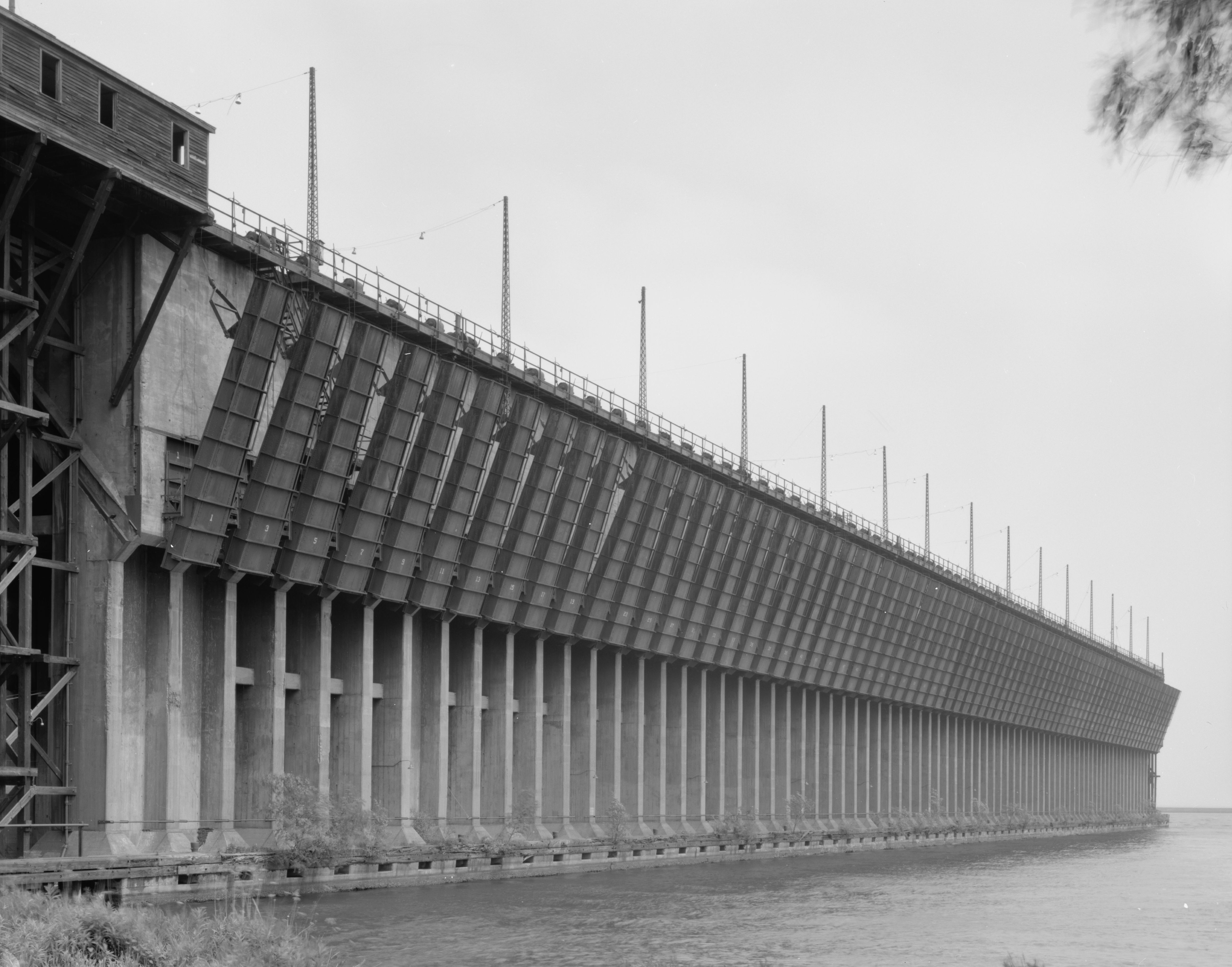
Ore dock (b. 1931) in Marquette, Michigan

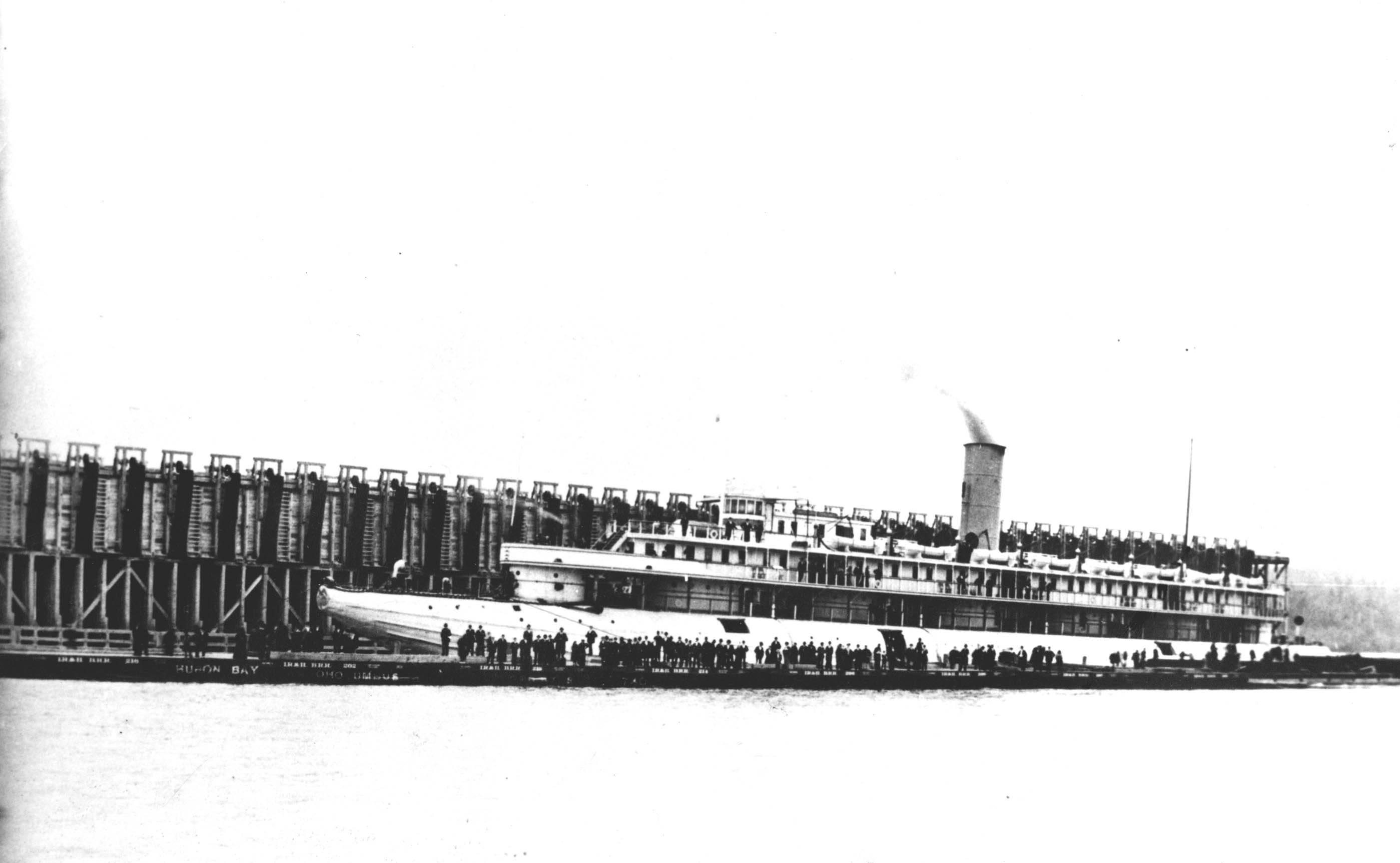
The IR&HB ore dock at Skanee, Michigan. The steamer Christopher Columbus (362 ft) is in the foreground. ca. 1893

An ore dock is a large structure used for loading ore (typically from railway cars or ore jennies) onto ships, which then carry the ore to steelworks or to transshipment points. Most known ore docks were constructed near iron mines on the upper Great Lakes and served the lower Great Lakes. Ore docks still in existence are typically about 60 feet (18 m) wide, 80 feet (24 m) high, and vary from 900 feet (270 m) to 2,400 feet (730 m) in length. They are commonly constructed from wood, steel, reinforced concrete, or combinations of these materials.

They are commonly used for loading bulk ore carriers with high mass, low-value ore, such as iron ore, in raw or taconite form.

== Construction ==
Ore docks are typically long, high structures, with a railway track or tracks along the top and a number of "pockets" into which ore is unloaded from railcars, typically by gravity. Each pocket has a chute that can be lowered to discharge the ore into the hold of a ship berthed alongside. The use of pockets and chutes allows the dock itself to be loaded with ore before it is transferred into the freighter.

The docks' storage bins or pockets are typically wider at the top than the bottom, and they lead to movable steel chutes. These chutes project out over the water at a slight angle from the sides of the docks. The hinged chutes, which are lowered to drop ore from the pockets into ships, are located at twelve-foot intervals over the length of the dock.

This spacing is not coincidental, as the docks and the lakers they could load evolved together, and laker hatch spacing is typically 12, or 24-foot (7.3 m) on center.

== History ==
Since the late 1800s, ore docks have been a common sight in many Lake Superior ports of Minnesota, Wisconsin and especially Michigan. Rich iron ore deposits were first discovered in the Upper Peninsula in the 1840s and remain a significant source of wealth for the state. By the 1890s, Michigan was the largest supplier of iron ore in the United States. Railroads would haul ore from the mines to the ore docks on the Great Lakes in places such as Escanaba and Marquette, where the cargo would be loaded onto ore freighters and transported to the rest of the country.

Iron ore was first discovered in Michigan's Upper Peninsula on September 19, 1844, by William A. Burt, who was then employed to lead a party engaged in surveying the Upper Peninsula on behalf of the United States government. Variations in the readings of magnetic compasses employed suggested that something was disturbing the local magnetic field, and, on investigation of part of the Marquette Iron Range, ore was found as close to the surface as just below the sod.

Development of this find was ongoing throughout the 1840s and early 1850s. The initial focus was on producing iron locally, as shipping was difficult. Early shipping attempts using mule teams, plank roads, and barrels loaded as deck cargo on schooners required transshipment after portaging the St. Marys River rapids, and costs proved prohibitive. However, as the mines continued to develop and railways were put in place, the volume of ore increased, far outstripping the local production capacity. In 1855, the Soo Locks opened, and the volume of ore shipped increased, with a total of 1447 tons shipped on various brigs and schooners. The first dock specifically for the ore trade was built in 1857 in Marquette. It was flat rather than elevated, and the vessels were loaded by men using wheelbarrows.

By 1860, the volume of ore shipped through the Soo Locks had increased to 114,401 tons; it fell to 49,909 tons the next year after the American Civil War broke out. But by 1862, an additional wooden dock had been constructed at Marquette, this time featuring an elevated railway trestle for ore jennies to discharge ore into pockets.

In 1911 another iron ore loading dock was built: the wooden frame work was replaced with a concrete and steel frame work. The new iron ore loading dock at Marquette was 1200 feet long; 75 feet high; and 60 feet wide. Four railroad tracks ran along the top and there was storage space inside the bottom concrete part for 60,000 tons of iron ore. The new ore loading dock incorporated a concrete bottom half with a light steel frame work on top, replacing the wooden supports previously used. While this structure was more expensive to build than previous iron ore loading docks, the builders claimed the new construction would hold up far longer than the old construction method. Schooners started to feature regularly spaced hatch covers, which sped up loading. But steamers of the day were not well adapted for bulk cargoes such as iron ore. They did not have hatches through their decks. Instead they had gangways through the sides. So ore shipments were loaded via wheelbarrows through the gangways. By having a flat surface on one side and moorings directly under the pockets, schooners could receive the ore directly. Steamers moored on the opposite side of the dock for the manual method using wheelbarrows. However, unloading was still a laborious hand-powered affair.

During this period, the iron ore trade was dwarfed by the grain and lumber trade. For example, in 1866 about 1,500,000 tons of grain were received at the port of Buffalo, New York, alone. Chicago received about 400,000 tons of lumber. The amount of iron ore delivered to all Lake Erie ports amounted to only 278,976 gross tons. Until 1876, Marquette was the only port on Lake Superior that shipped iron ore to the east.

After the Civil War, advancement was rapid. The Cleveland Iron Mining Company's dock was 30 feet (9.1 m) above the lake level and was originally built with 29 schooner pockets and 6 steam boat pockets. By 1872, it had been extended an additional 350 feet (110 m), providing 54 additional pockets. During the 1873 season, the total tonnage of iron ore shipped from the port of Marquette was 1,175,000 tons.

As additional ore ranges (the Gogebic, Menominee East, and Menominee West) began to be developed, and the US developed more rapidly as an industrial power, other ports also constructed ore docks, primarily on Lake Superior. For example, Ashland, Wisconsin, the natural port for the Gogebic Range, had three docks by 1916, the first built by the Milwaukee, Lake Shore and Western Railway in 1884-1885. It was 1,400 feet (430 m) long, with 234 pockets, and four tracks on the dock, and could hold 25,000 tons of ore.

The natural port for the Menominee East range was Escanaba, Michigan; the first docks there were built in 1865.

By 1884, locomotives played a vital part in hauling ore from the mines to the docks. The pockets and chutes were filled using the hopper-type ore cars. In 1889, the Duluth, South Shore and Atlantic Railway operated a dock with 284 pockets. The railroads also provided alternate transportation for people, goods and eventually, iron ore.

The length and capacity of docks corresponded with the capacity of the ore freighters which they were designed to accommodate. As ore carriers increased in height and width, higher pocket openings were required and new docks had to be constructed, and older ones rebuilt. In 1867, vessels carried ore cargoes of 550 tons. The first steel ore freighters introduced in the 1880s had a capacity of 2,500 tons. By 1898, ships were carrying 6,400 tons and by 1938, 15,000 tons.

The demand for iron ore grew, faster dispatch of vessels was necessary, and larger rail cars and the number of more powerful locomotives for transporting the ore from mines to the docks increased with improved technology. These developments caused the old wooden Duluth, South Shore and Atlantic Railway ore dock built in 1898 to become obsolete. A new dock was constructed by the Lake Superior and Ishpeming Railroad Company of reinforced concrete and steel in 1911 and 1912 in the Upper Harbor near Presque Isle Park. This dock is 75 feet (23 m) high, 1,200 feet (370 m) long and has 200 pockets, with a total capacity of 50,000 tons of ore pellets. By 1929, more than one and one half times the combined yearly tonnage of the Panama and Suez canals passed through the Soo Locks. The dock is still in use today.

Activity also continued in Marquette's Lower Harbor. The Duluth, South Short and Atlantic Railway, in order to remain competitive, completed construction of a new dock in 1932. This dock was constructed of steel and concrete, 85.5 feet (26.1 m) high, 969 feet (295 m) long, with 150 pockets. The total capacity was 47,500 tons. The D.S.S. & A. Railway merged with other companies to form the Soo Line. The dock remained in operation until the late 1960s, when a decrease in demand for iron ore forced it to close. In 1987, the Soo Line sold its Lake States Division to Wisconsin Central Ltd. The ownership passed to the latter railroad, where it remains today.

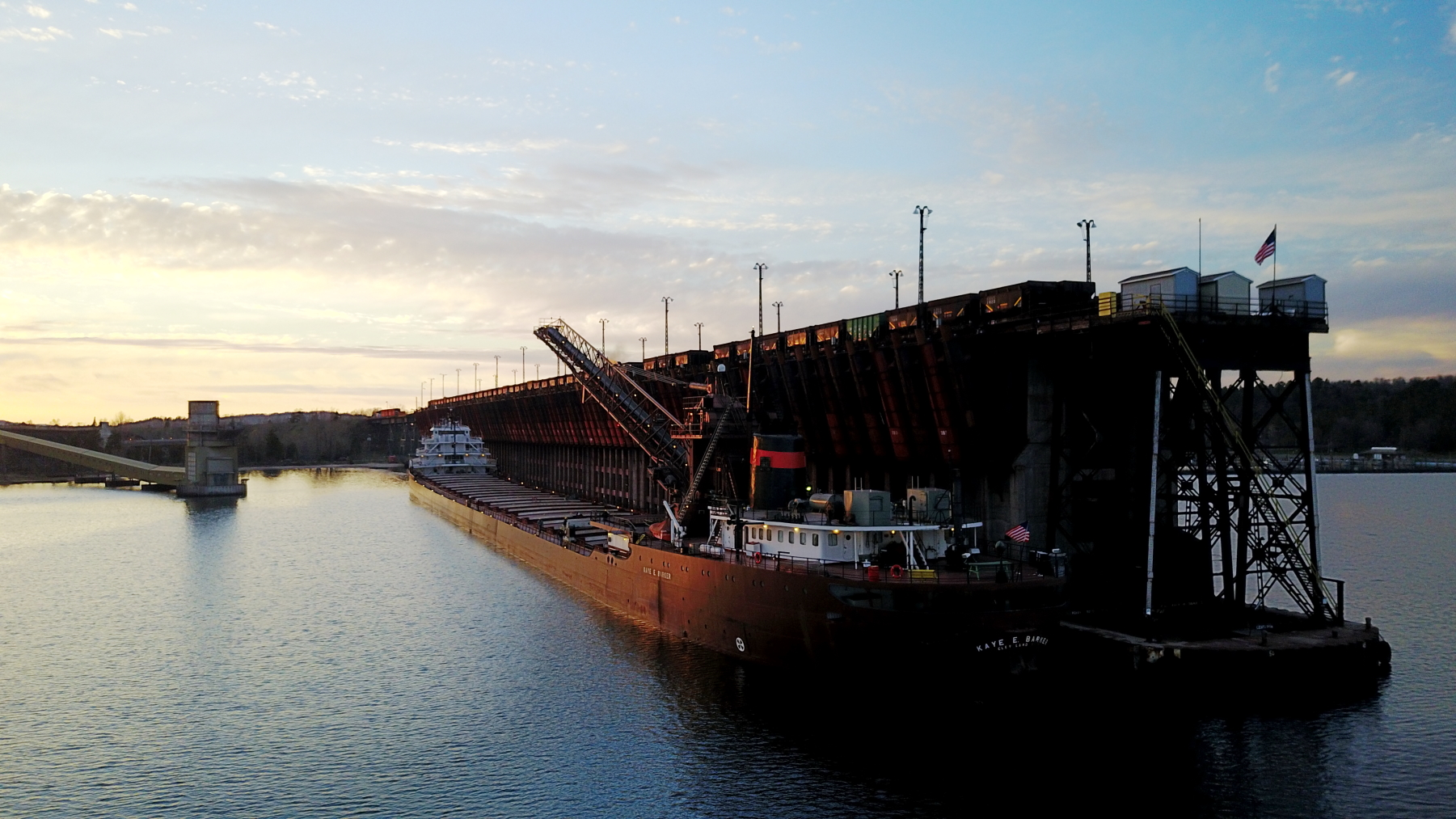
Kaye E Barker at the ore dock in Marquette, Michigan in 2017

== Today ==
Many docks have been torn down or abandoned, but a few remain in operation. In 2008, the Lake Superior & Ishpeming dock, one of the docks at Marquette, Michigan, loaded its 400 millionth ton of ore after 90 years of service. Another dock, built later by Merritt-Chapman & Scott for the Duluth, South Shore and Atlantic Railway (DSS&A), was taken out of service in 1971. As of 2022, there are plans to redevelop this ore dock. The Mining Journal, a local newspaper, has stated that these include "ecological education facilities, year-round indoor botanical gardens, historical preservation and education, and community spaces."

The largest dock of the type in the world exist in Superior, Wisconsin as part of BNSF's Allouez Taconite Facility, however, these docks have been abandoned since 1978. Ore docks in Duluth, MN, and Two Harbors, MN, are still in service and operated by Canadian National Railway and Lake Superior and Ishpeming Railroad.

Ore docks are mentioned in popular culture, at least one high school athletic team, the Ashland, Wisconsin Oredockers takes their name from them, and they have been mentioned in song.

== See also ==
- Dock (maritime)
- Hulett - a device used to remove ore from the freighter's holds at the other end of the journey
- Lake freighter - general bulk cargo ship whose evolution paralleled that of the docks.
