= Awra (disambiguation) =

Awra Briguela (born 2004) is a Filipino child actor.

Awra or AWRA may also refer to:

- A term referring to intimate parts in Islam
- Awra Amba, an Ethiopian community
- American Water Resources Association (AWRA)

== See also ==
- Aura (disambiguation)
