= Naked Remedy =

- Origin: West Midlands, England
- Genres: Psychedelic rock Garage; Experimental rock
- Years active: 2009–present
- Members: Dave Small; Tom Callinswood
- Past members: Nav Sahota; Jack Ryland-Smith
- Website: Naked Remedy's Website

Naked Remedy are a British psychedelic blues duo formed in Worcestershire, England. The current line-up consists of Dave Small (Vocals/Drums) and Tom Callinswood (Guitar/Effects). They performed at Forum Live at the LG Arena Birmingham before Paul Weller took to the main stage in November 2010.

== Background ==
Naked Remedy formed from the ashes of AurA after lead singer Dave Small together with Tom Callinswood with Nav Sahota and Jack Ryland-Smith found themselves playing together regularly at local jam sessions, the four discovered that they could improvise and invent music together for hours. Much of their reputation has been built on the strength and spontaneity of their live show.

The band won Worcester's Got Talent in October 2009 winning first prize of £2,500, and recorded a 4 track EP of original material apart from a version of "You Got the Love"; Naked Remedy have also performed for many local charities including Wyrefest 2009 for The Proton Effect, Help For Heroes, Loaded 2010, Boozestock 2009 and a Help for Haiti fundraiser. They also appeared live at the world's largest VW Camper Van Event Vanfest in 2010 and again in 2011. In 2012 they appeared on the Jubilee stage at the annual Glastonbudget festival.

Past individual achievements of band members include sharing the bill with Velvet Revolver, Status Quo, Jeff Healey, Walter Trout, Chicken Shack, Wishbone Ash, Hayseed Dixie and Rose Hill Drive, and bookings at The Royal Albert Hall and Download Festival 2008. They have recently supported Goldray, a group featuring Kenwyn House (Reef) and Paul Winterhart (Kula Shaker).

== BBC Sessions ==
Naked Remedy have appeared on BBC Introducing with Andrew Marston They also headlined The Hereford & Worcester Introducing Stage to launch the start of the Worcester Music Festival in August 2010

== Studio recording ==
In between the visceral dissonance of live performance, the band found time to record their debut self-titled, which sold out within three months.

== Appearances ==
- Arley Fest
- Worcester Music Festival
- Bridge Bash
