= Huron Bay =

Bay on Lake Superior in Michigan

- Seepeeweeshee (Chippewa)
- Location within Michigan
- Location: Baraga County, Michigan
- Coordinates: 46°53′N 88°14′W
- Type: Bay
- River sources: Huron, Ravine, Silver, Slate
- Primary outflows: Lake Superior
- Basin countries: USA
- Max. length: 12.3 miles (19.8 km)
- Max. width: < 1 mile (1.6 km)
- Surface elevation: 604 feet (184 m)
- Frozen: seasonal
- Islands: none
- Settlements: Skanee
- Website: Huron National Wildlife Refuge

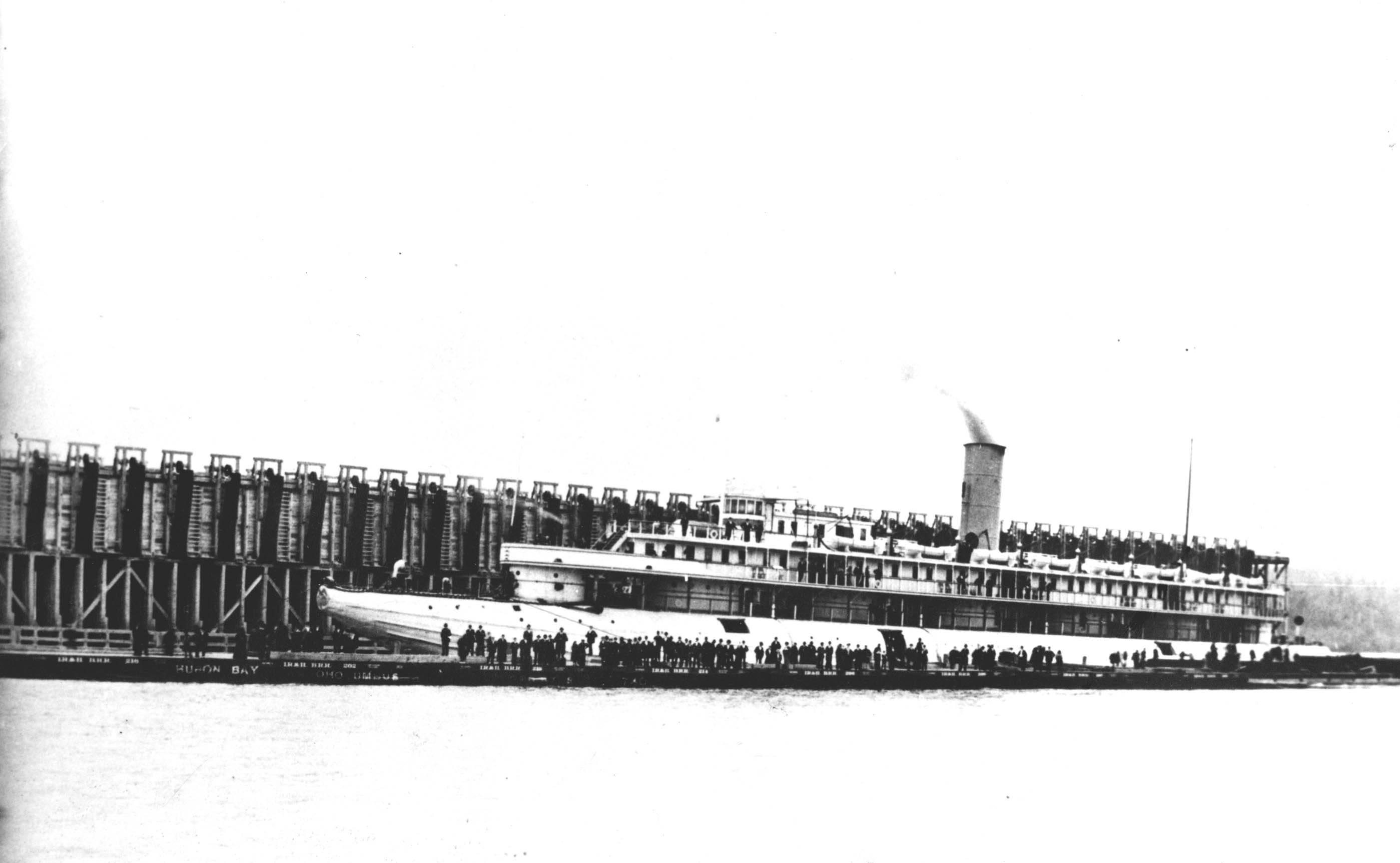
Boom times in Huron Bay (c. 1893); the ore dock at Skanee, Michigan

Huron Bay is a long, narrow bay 12.3 miles (19.8 km) long, located in Baraga County, Michigan, on the northern shore of the Upper Peninsula of the State of Michigan. The bay, oriented in a northeast-southwest direction, is bounded by the Huron Mountains on its east and the Abbaye Peninsula on its west.

This bay offers mariners entry into the interior of the Huron Mountains, the highest mountain range in Michigan. This bay is extremely narrow, being less than 1.0 mile (1.6 km) wide for most of its length, and it is one of the largest freshwater fjords in North America.

Efforts during the 1890s to settle and develop the Huron Bay area all ended in failure. An optimistic corporation in Michigan hired engineers and a work crew to grade a roadbed for the Iron Range and Huron Bay Railroad, which had been meant to carry iron ore from Champion, Michigan, in the Marquette Iron Range, to Huron Bay. After a brief period of development in 1891-93, the railroad went bankrupt in 1893 before any trains ever ran on the line. A bayside slate quarry also failed.

As of 2013, the bay's shorelines are almost uninhabited. A paved road leads to the shoreline hamlet of Skanee, Michigan.

The cold, deep waters of Huron Bay provide habitat for lake trout.

== See also ==
Huron Island Light located on Lighthouse Island in the Huron Islands Wilderness
