= Aura: Fate of the Ages =

2004 video game

- Developer: Streko-Graphics Inc.
- Publisher: The Adventure Company
- Designer: Elizabeth Petzold
- Platform: Windows
- Release: NA: June 24, 2004; EU: August 27, 2004
- Genre: Adventure
- Mode: Single player

Aura: Fate of the Ages is an adventure-genre computer game created by Canadian studio Streko-Graphics Inc. and published by The Adventure Company. In 2007, Streko-Graphics Inc. released the second chapter, Aura II: The Sacred Rings, which continues the story of the first game. The final chapter of Aura trilogy, Aura III: Catharsis, was originally slated to be released in 2011, but this project was eventually cancelled.

== Development ==
The game was developed by Streko-Graphics, a company founded in September 2001.

== Reception ==
Reception

Aggregate score
Aggregator	Score
Metacritic	63/100

Review scores
Publication	Score
Adventure Gamers	3.5/5
Computer Games Magazine	2.5/5
Computer Gaming World	3/5
Game Informer	7.25/10
GameSpot	6.4/10
GameSpy	1.5/5
GameZone	7.3/10
IGN	7.3/10
PC Gamer (US)	17%
RPGFan	53%

The game received "mixed" reviews according to the review aggregation website Metacritic.

IGN said, "What little Aura does to advance the genre it does remarkably well. In an age when encountering logical puzzles is as rare as pooping out gold nuggets, Aura shines as a game that attempts to bring a little reason into the mix." However, GameSpy said, "The few good puzzles contained within aren't worth the time and risk that you might not even be able to complete it."
