= Aura (Turkish band) =

Aura (stylized as AURA) is a four-member Turkish music group formed in 2026. They made their debut with the single "YUH!"

== Members ==
- Aslı Göztaşı - Main Dancer: Aslı Göztaşı was born on February 26, 2003. She represents the water element in the group. Before joining the group, she worked as a professional dancer and dance instructor.
- Suzy Roumenov - Lead Vocalist: Suelnur Roumenov Marinov, known by her stage name Suzy, was born on October 12, 2002. She is of Uzbek and Bulgarian descent. She represents the air element in the group. Before joining the group, she was involved in Vogue dance and performance art.
- Meri Aslan - Main Vocalist: İrem Aslan, known by her stage name Meri, was born on September 9, 2007, in Berlin, Germany. She represents the earth element in the group. Before joining the group, she also released solo songs.
- Esra Mutlu - Principal Dancer: Esra Mutlu was born on February 26, 2007. She represents the fire element in the group. She began her career as a dancer.

== Discography ==
- YUH! - May 15, 2026
- Tuzak - July 10, 2026
- PES - August 21, 2026
- 2036 - October 23, 2026
