= Aura Erbil =

Project
- Construction started: 2013
- Opening date: unknown
- Status: Under development
- Size: 200,000 m^{2} (2,200,000 sq ft)
- Developer: Zardman
- Architect: SOMA

Location
- Country: Iraq
- Autonomous region: Kurdistan Region
- Governorate: Erbil
- City: Erbil
- Address: Salaheddine Road, Erbil, Iraqi Kurdistan

Aura Erbil is one of the major projects in Erbil. It is a 200,000 sq. meter real estate project designed in an artistic manner. The project is located in Shoresh District on the Massif-Salaheddine road in Erbil, Kurdistan which now is considered to be the new city center. Aura Ebril plans to offer a five-star hotel building, 269 luxury flats, 40,000 square metres of shopping, movie theaters, greenery, landscaped circulation, cutting-edge blocks of offices, and a central entertainment mall having ground-floor retail outlets.

== Location ==
Aura, the project in Erbil, is located on the Salaheddine road. By Passing Aura, straight to the 90 degree of Salaheddine road, there is a new road leading to the airport of Erbil that will be built and will become the reason why Aura is expected to change the Skyline of Erbil to become the new city center.

== See also ==
- Downtown Dubai
- Erbil
- Kurdistan
- Barzan
