= Copper Country State Forest =

State Forest in Baraga and Dickinson counties, Michigan

- Map showing state forests in Michigan

- Location within Michigan Location within the United States
- Location: Upper Peninsula, Michigan
- Coordinates: 46.62°N 89.16°W
- Governing body: Michigan Department of Natural Resources

Copper Country State Forest is a state forest in the west-central Upper Peninsula of Michigan. It is operated by the Michigan Department of Natural Resources.

== Overview ==
Like other Upper Peninsula state forests, Copper Country is made up of clear cut parcels of forest land in thinly settled portions of counties such as Baraga County and Dickinson County. The state of Michigan acquired these land parcels after they had been stripped of their old growth trees in the late 19th and early 20th centuries; today, the state manages the land for reforestation. In many cases, the second-growth trees that have sprouted throughout Copper Country land are pulpwood trees such as aspen and birch.

In addition to pulpwood logging, the Copper Country land is valuable for active recreation, such as camping, fishing, and hunting. Many of the towns and cities of the Upper Peninsula have an active culture of whitetail deer hunting.
