= Autonomous robot architecture =

The Autonomous Robot Architecture (AuRA) is a hybrid deliberative/reactive robot architecture developed by American roboticist and roboethicist Ronald C. Arkin at the Georgia Institute of Technology. It was developed in mid-1980s. AuRA is one of the first Hybrid Robotic Architecture developed. Hybrid Robotic Architecture forms form combination of reactive and deliberative approaches and gets best from both the approaches.

== See also ==
- Three-layer architecture
- Servo, subsumption, and symbolic architecture
- Distributed architecture for mobile navigation (DAMN)
- ATLANTIS architecture
