= Arvon Township Hall =

- U.S. National Register of Historic Places
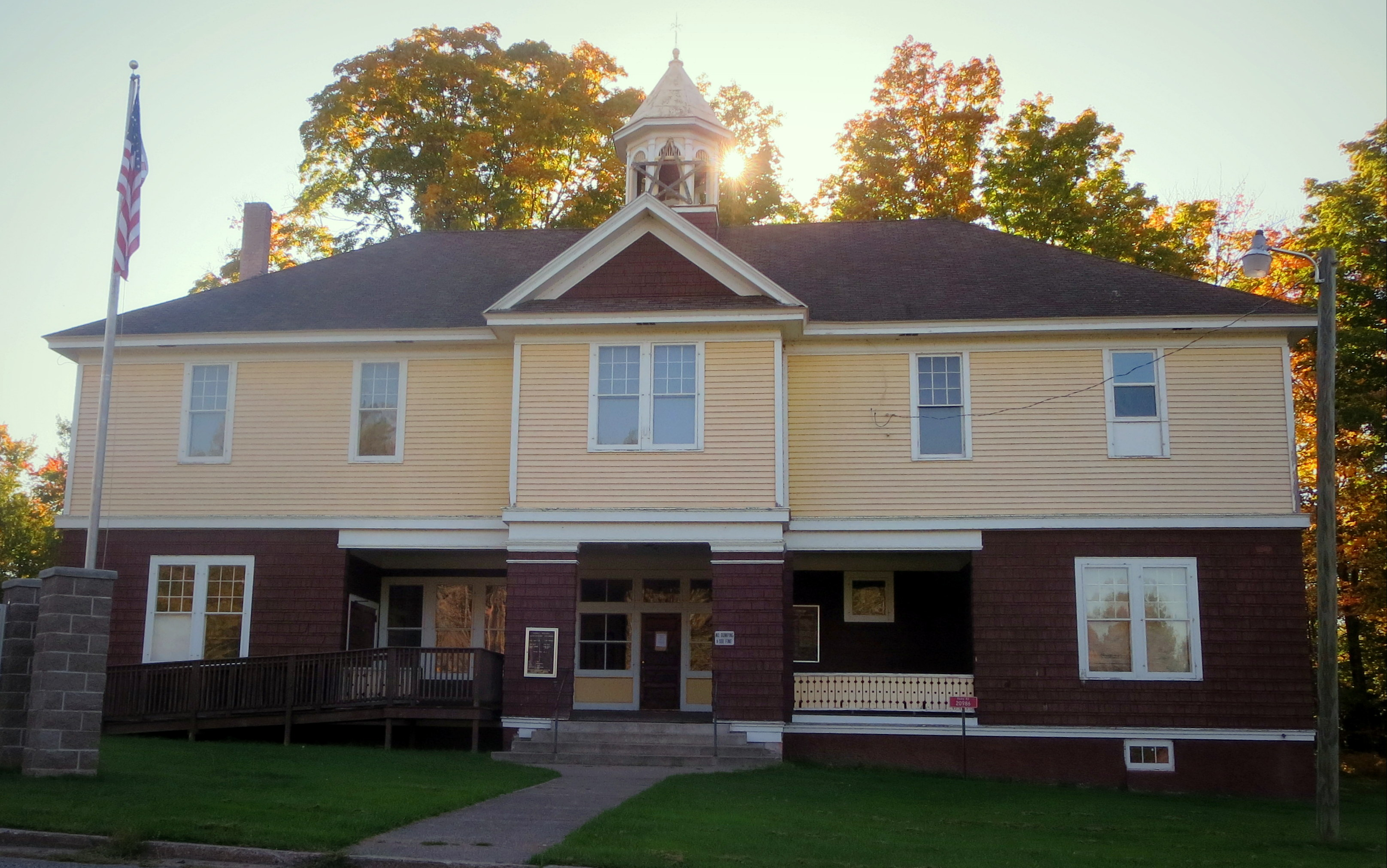
- Front of the building

- Location within Michigan Location within the United States
- Interactive map
- Location: Park Rd., Skanee, Michigan
- Coordinates: 46°52′37″N 88°13′10″W
- Area: less than one acre
- Built: 1915
- Built by: Fred Carlson
- Architect: Charles W. Maass
- NRHP reference No.: 81000302
- Added to NRHP: July 30, 1981

The Arvon Township Hall is a public building located on Park Road in Skanee, Michigan. It was listed on the National Register of Historic Places in 1981.

== History ==
The Huron Bay Iron and Slate Company, located in Arvon, was a major employer in the area in the late 1800s. The Township offices were located in its headquarters from 1874 to 1878. In 1878, a one-room schoolhouse with associated township office was constructed just in front of where the current township hall stands. However, the community continue to grow, and by the turn of the century there were 650 male voters on the rolls; with women and children the actual township population was likely far higher. A new school was constructed in 1910, and in 1914, the community decided to build a new town hall.

In 1915, this hall was constructed by Fred Carlson of Hancock, Michigan, based on a design by Charles W. Maass, also from Hancock. At the time the hall was built, the area was still a sparsely settled frontier, and the township government played an important role in the local community. The hall was used as a community center and hosted public meetings. It continues to be used for meetings, as well as amateur theatrical productions, community pageants, ethnic music festivals and other recreational activities.

== Description ==
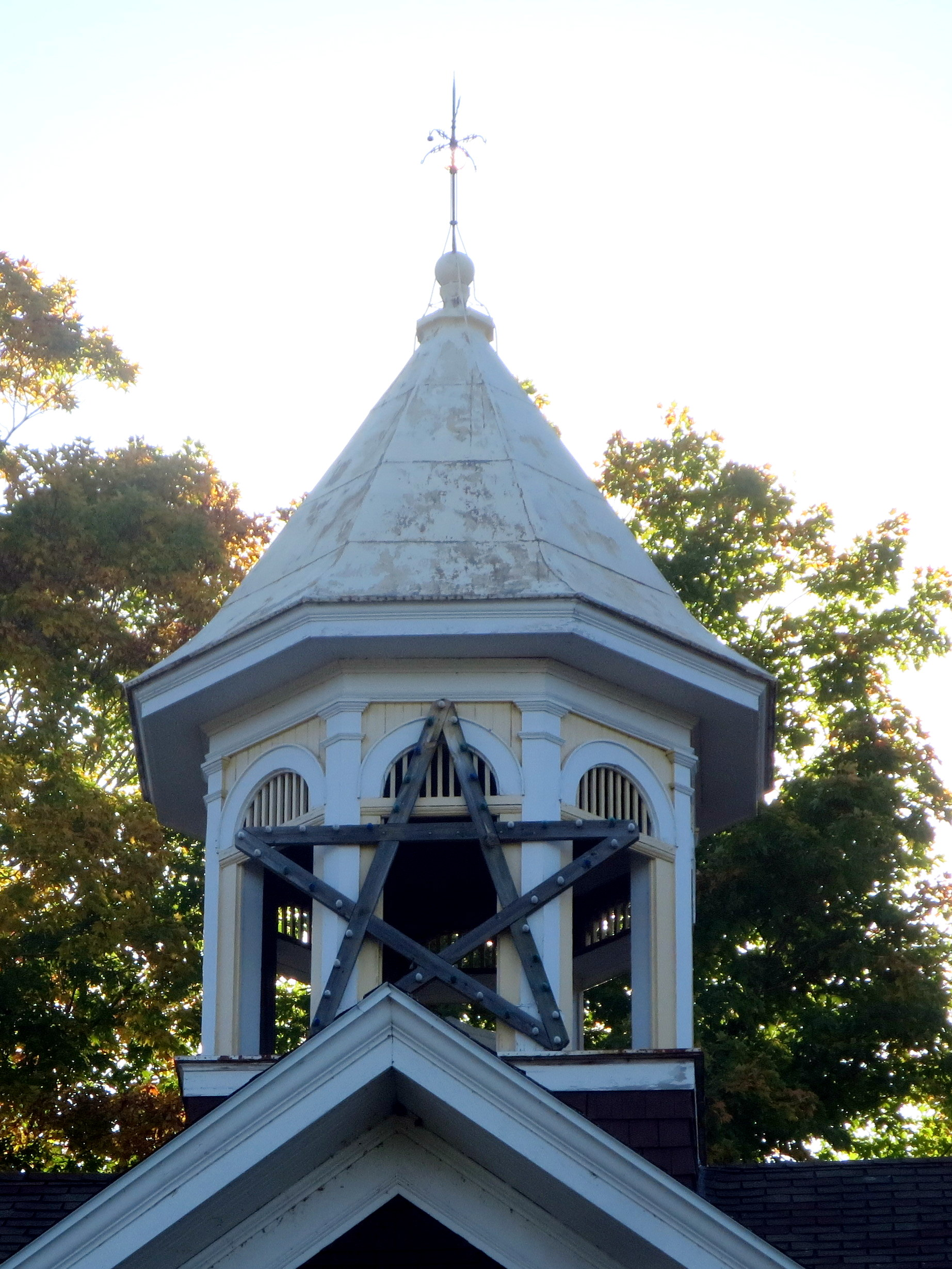
Closeup of the cupola

The Arvon Township Hall is a symmetric two-story rectangular building of frame construction on a concrete foundation. The first story is covered with brown-stained shingles and the second with yellow painted horizontal board siding. The hipped roof features a decorative six-sided cupola, dominating the facade, topped with pyramid roof and an iron finial. A central entrance pavilion contains a second story bay over a recessed porch. The entrance is framed with large square pillars, and the porch contains decorative gingerbreading. The windows are symmetrically arranged on both the first and second floors.

Inside the building is a large meeting hall with an associated kitchen, a smaller meeting room, and a hallway containing stairs leading to the second floor. On the second floor is a large auditorium/gymnasium with dressing rooms, a coat room, and a ticket booth. A balcony is overhead.
