= Olli Kiiskinen =

Finnish politician

Olli Kiiskinen (15 August 1875 – 5 July 1943) was a Finnish farmer and politician, born in Kerimäki. He was a Member of the Parliament of Finland from 1909 to 1910, representing the Agrarian League.
