= Heikki Kiiskinen =

Finnish politician

Johan Henrik (Heikki) Kiiskinen (12 May 1868 – 17 November 1915) was a Finnish farmer and politician, born in Iisalmi. He was a member of the Parliament of Finland from 1907 to 1908, representing the Agrarian League.
