= Aura Rostand =

Nicaraguan poet

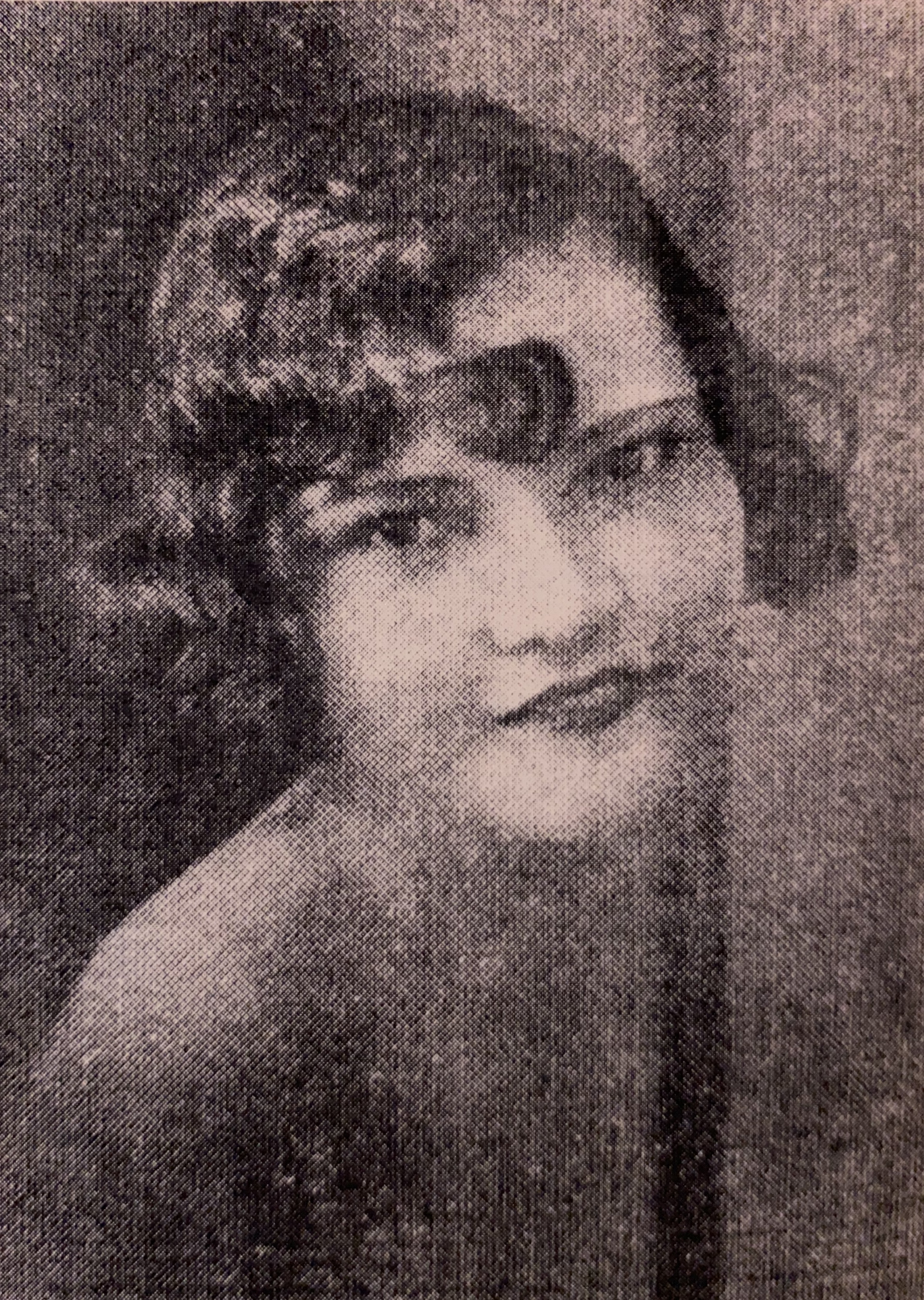
- Nicaraguan Poet

Aura Rostand was the pen name for Nicaraguan poet Maria de la Selva (1899–1957). She was the sister of poet Salomón de la Selva and artist Roberto de la Selva.

Rostand, a trained teacher, published her first poem aged eighteen. She travelled throughout Latin America and the United States while publishing poetry. Rostand also wrote journalistic works for Mexican and Costa Rican publications.

In 1927, she was appointed Nicaraguan counsel to Detroit, Michigan. She was the first Nicaraguan women to hold a diplomatic position. She held that post until 1929.

While in Detroit Rostand had a miscarriage and her brother, Salomón, gave birth to a son called Salomoncito. The circumstances around this, as well as analysis of correspondence between the siblings, led literary historian Steven White to question whether Salomoncito was a child of an incestuous relationship between the siblings.

Rostand left the United States and moved to Bluefields, Nicaragua. She stayed there until 1939 when she divorced her husband and moved to Mexico City. There she befriended Frida Kahlo, Diego Rivera and María Félix

Rostand also wrote journalistic works for Mexican and Costa Rican publications.

Rostand married Asdrubal Ibarra Rojas, with whom she had two children, Aura Maria Ibarra (1930–2013) and Plutarco Ibarra (1934–1972).
