= Aura Kiiskinen =

Finnish politician (1878–1968)

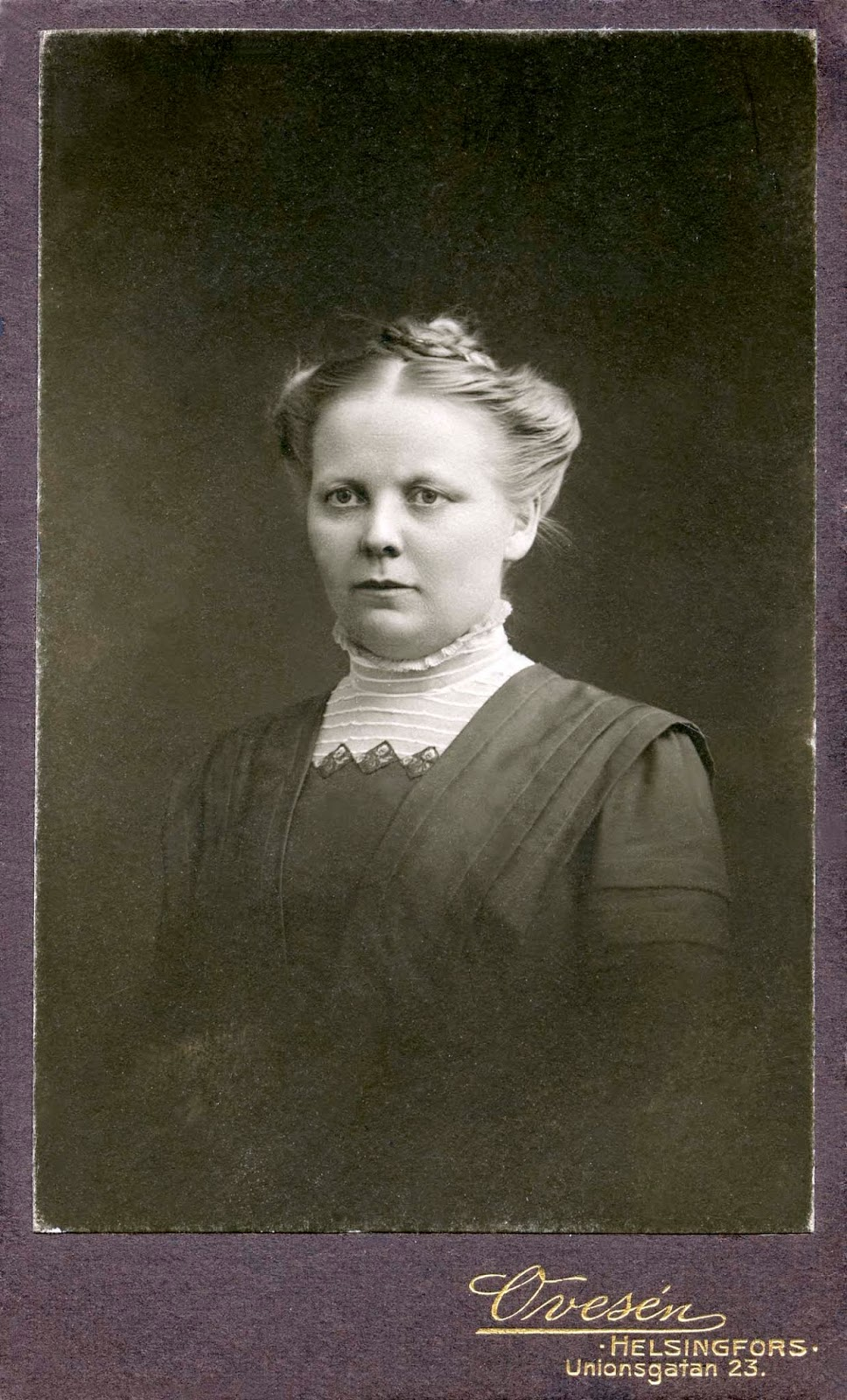
Aura Kiiskinen in 1908

Auroora Maria ('Aura') Kiiskinen (March 9, 1878 – December 12, 1968) was a Finnish politician and member of parliament. She was first elected from the Kuopio West electoral district (now Northern Savonia) in the 1908 election, serving until 1911, and was later re-elected from the Uusimaa district from 1914 until 1918, both times representing the Social Democratic Party (SDP).

Kiiskinen was born in Kuopion maalaiskunta, Grand Duchy of Finland, in 1878. She completed primary school, and trained as a seamstress. Soon she however became increasingly active in left-wing politics and involved in campaign and party administration, working full-time variously as secretary, treasurer and organiser of the SDP women's wing.

After the 'Red' (left-wing) defeat in the Finnish Civil War, Kiiskinen fled to the newly established Soviet Russia, where she continued her political activities, as well as working later in a teaching role in Soviet Karelia. She died in Petrozavodsk, Soviet Union, in 1968.
