= Frutolf of Michelsberg =

Frutolf of Michelsberg (died 17 January 1103) was a monk in Michelsberg Abbey in Bamberg, Germany, of which he became prior. He was probably a native of Bavaria.

Frutolf was possibly a teacher of the quadrivium in the monastery, but principally a librarian and manuscript copyist. In this capacity he was responsible for a substantial increase in the stock of the Michelsberg library. Some of the manuscripts he copied are still extant.

He was also an author, writing in Latin. His "Chronicle of the World" (Chronica) is among the most complete and best-organised of the early Middle Ages. It extends from the creation to 1099 and after Frutolf's death was edited and extended by other Michelsberg monks. It is also fairly certain that a "Breviary of Music" (Breviarium de musica) is by him. An unedited liturgical treatise entitled De officiis divinis (On the divine offices) survives in Frutolf's own hand in Bamberg, Staatsbibliothek, Msc. Lit. 134. He may also have written De rhithmomachie, a work concerning a popular medieval mathematical and strategy based board game. He developed a critical view of history and awareness of anachronism, among other things pointing out that "some songs as 'vulgar fables' made Theoderic the Great, Attila and Ermanaric into contemporaries, when any reader of Jordanes knew that this was not the case". .

== Sources ==
- Waitz, G. (ed.), 1844: Ekkehardi Uraugiensis Chronica, MGH SS 6, 33-210. Stuttgart: Monumenta Germaniae Historica (online)
- Schmale, Franz-Josef (ed.), 1972: Frutolfs und Ekkehards Chroniken und die anonyme Kaiserchronik. in I. Schmale-Ott: Ausgewählte Quellen zur deutschen Geschichte des Mittelalters (Freiherr-vom-Stein-Gedächtnisausgabe), vol. 15, 1972; includes inter alia Einführung zu Frutolf, pp. 4–19; Frutolfs Chronik, pp. 46–121 (Latin/German text from the year 1000 onwards)
- Schmale, F.-J., Schmale-Ott (eds.), MGH 33
- McCarthy, T. J. H., Music, scholasticism and reform: Salian Germany, 1024–1125 (Manchester, 2009), pp. 40–3, 94–108.
- McCarthy, T. J. H., ‘Frutolf of Michelsberg’s Chronicle, the schools of Bamberg and the transmission of imperial polemic’, Haskins Society Journal 23 (2011), 51–70.
- McCarthy, T. J. H., Chronicles of the Investiture Contest: Frutolf of Michelsberg and his continuators (Manchester, 2014). ISBN 9780719084706.
- McCarthy, T. J. H., ‘Quos manu sua pene omnes ipse scripsit: Frutolf of Michelsberg’s legacy to a Bamberg scriptorium’, in A. Nievergelt et al. (eds), Scriptorium. Wesen, Funktion, Eigenheiten (Comité international de Paléographie latine, XVIII. Internationaler Kongress St. Gallen 11.–14. September 2013; Munich, 2015), pp. 325–37.
- McCarthy, T. J. H., ‘Scriptural allusion in the crusading accounts of Frutolf of Michelsberg and his continuators’, in E. Lapina and N. Morton (eds), The uses of the Bible in crusader sources (Leiden, 2017), pp. 152–75.
- McCarthy, T. J. H., The continuations of Frutolf of Michelsberg's Chronicle (Schriften der Monumenta Germaniae Historica 74; Wiesbaden, 2019).
