= Gull Rock Light Station =

Lighthouse in Michigan, United States

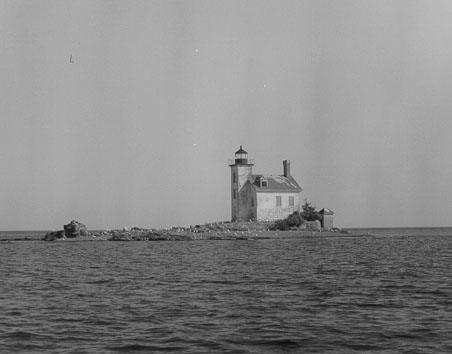
- Undated USCG photo.
- Location: West of Manitou Island, Grant Township, Keweenaw County, Michigan
- Coordinates: 47°25′2″N 87°39′49″W

Tower
- Constructed: 1867
- Construction: Brick
- Automated: 1913
- Height: 46 feet (14 m)
- Shape: Square brick tower with cast iron lantern room. and gallery attached church-style” to 2-story brick Light keeper's house
- Markings: white with black lantern and red roof on house
- Heritage: National Register of Historic Places listed place

Light
- First lit: 1867
- Focal height: 50 feet (15 m)
- Lens: Fourth order Fresnel lens (original), 9.8-inch (250 mm) Tideland Signal acrylic lens (current)
- Range: 7.8 nautical miles; 14 kilometres (9 mi)
- Characteristic: 2 white flashes every 5 seconds. 0.4s fl 0.6s ec. 0.4s fl 3.6s ec.
- Gull Rock Light Station
- U.S. National Register of Historic Places
- Nearest city: Copper Harbor, Michigan
- MPS: U.S. Coast Guard Lighthouses and Light Stations on the Great Lakes TR
- NRHP reference No.: 84001751
- Added to NRHP: July 19, 1984

The Gull Rock Light Station is an active lighthouse located on Gull Rock, just west of Manitou Island, off the tip of Michigan's Keweenaw Peninsula in Lake Superior. The light was listed on the National Register of Historic Places in 1984, even as its condition deteriorated, resulting in its placement on the Lighthouse Digest Doomsday List.

== History ==
The diminutive island is the “peak of an underwater mountain” between the tip of the Keweenaw Peninsula and Manitou Island.

The bay on the eastern side of the Keweenaw Peninsula offers protection to mariners from the prevailing northwestern winds on Lake Superior; however, the passage by Gull Rock, a tiny islet about one-half mile off Manitou Island's western tip, proved a serious threat. With that in mind, in 1866 Congress appropriated $15,000 for lighthouse construction on Gull Rock. Construction began in 1867 and the light was put into service on November 1 of the same year. The lighthouse shares its design with that of Granite Island Light and Huron Island Light Station.

In 1901, a 40-foot (12 m) retaining wall was built northeast of the structure to protect the lighthouse from waves washing over the island. In 1913, the light was automated and responsibility for care of the light was transferred to the keeper of the nearby Manitou Island Light Station. Since that time, Gull Rock was all but abandoned and the station fell into disrepair. In 2005, the station was transferred to the Gull Rock Lightkeepers, a nonprofit organization. They are working to restore the lighthouse, which is still an active navigational aid.

The original Fourth Order Fresnel lens was manufactured by Barbier and Fenestre of Paris. It is said to be on display at Whitefish Point Great Lakes Shipwreck Museum, although Terry Pepper claims that the lens may be misidentified. Lighthouse painted white; lantern and gallery painted black; roofs are red. Gravely endangered by erosion and wave action, this lighthouse is on the Lighthouse Digest Doomsday List.

The lighthouse exterior was recently repaired and painted. The interior had been left open, and is in ruins with the removed roof jettisoned into it, and it suffered extensive water damage.

The rocky shoals claimed six vessels, namely: Spokane (October 28, 1907), E.N. Saunders (May 30, 1910), L.C. Waldo (November 8, 1913), Taurus (November 27, 1918), Samuel Mather (October 19, 1923), and Charles C. West (September 7, 1926). All were salvaged and removed to sail another day. The likely culprit was low visibility due to fog. The failure to place a fog signal would have been a factor. It is said that this was a low priority area, used by relatively few vessels, “as a short-cut . . . to find safety on the lee side of the point during northerly storms, [and not] a normal traffic route.” As noted by Terry Pepper, the author of Seeing the Light and the Director of the Great Lakes Light Keepers Association: "Two hundred and fifty feet in length and one hundred feet in width, the highest point of Gull Rock stood less than twelve feet above the water under the calmest conditions, becoming virtually invisible in the gray darkness of stormy days when vessels were most likely to be threading their way through the passage."

Major structural repairs were done on the light in the summer of 2012.

== Description ==
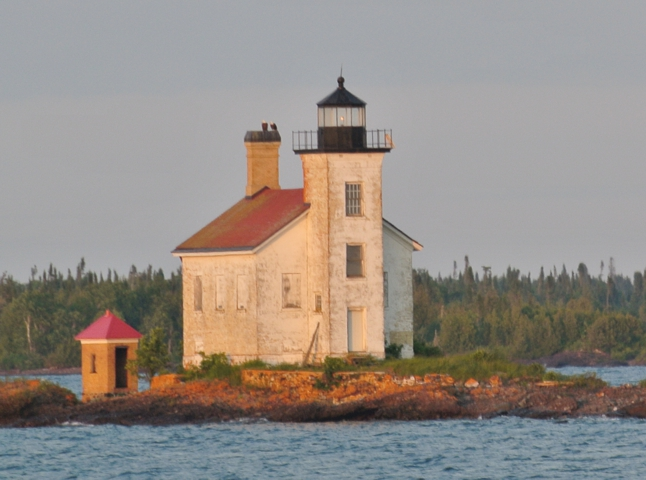
Gull Rock light station in 2017 (note Bald Eagles on chimney)

The Gull Rock Light includes both the light tower and an attached keeper's house. The tower is constructed of brick, and measures 9 by 9 by 46 feet (2.7 by 2.7 by 14.0 m) high with internal stairs. The lantern is iron with ten sides and vertical bars. The original lens was a Fourth Order Fresnel lens manufactured by Barbier and Fenestre of Paris. The original lens was replaced by a 9.8-inch (250 mm) acrylic lens; this lens continues to function in the light. The keeper's house is a two-story structure, constructed of brick with a gable roof. The house has suffered severe interior deterioration because of the length of time it has been abandoned. It formerly had a dormer, which is now missing. A brick outhouse is also on site and survives to this day.

== Getting there ==
The light is closed and off limits to visitors. It may be seen by private boat or on lighthouse cruises run by Noah's Ark Charters and the Isle Royale Queen IV out of Copper Harbor, Michigan, or the Keweenaw Star out of Houghton, Michigan.
