= Brockway Mountain Drive =

County road in Keweenaw County, Michigan, United States

Brockway Mountain Drive
- Brockway Mountain Drive highlighted in red

Route information
- Maintained by KCRC
- Length: 8.883 mi (14.296 km)
- Existed: October 14, 1933–present
- Restrictions: Closed to vehicular traffic in winter

Major junctions
- West end: M-26 near Eagle Harbor
- East end: M-26 in Copper Harbor

Location
- Country: United States
- State: Michigan
- County: Keweenaw

Highway system
- Keweenaw County Roads
- Brockway Mountain Drive
- U.S. National Register of Historic Places
- NRHP reference No.: 100001345
- Added to NRHP: July 24, 2017

Brockway Mountain Drive is an 8.8-mile-long (14.2 km) scenic roadway just west of Copper Harbor in the Upper Peninsula of Michigan in the United States. Drivers can access the road from State Highway M-26 on either end near Eagle Harbor to the west or Copper Harbor to the east in the Keweenaw Peninsula. The drive runs along the ridge of Brockway Mountain on the Keweenaw Fault and climbs to 1,320 feet (402 m) above sea level, 720 feet (219 m) above the surface of Lake Superior. Several viewpoints along the route allow for panoramas of Copper Harbor, Lake Superior, and undeveloped woodland. On a clear day, Isle Royale is visible approximately 50 miles (80 km) in distance from the top of the mountain.

Brockway Mountain was named for Daniel D. Brockway, one of the pioneer residents of the area. The road was constructed by the county road commission with funding through Depression-era work programs in 1933. It was briefly used as a connection for the parallel state highway after it opened. Since it opened, Brockway Mountain Drive has been recognized nationally and locally in several media outlets for its picturesque qualities, usually in profiles of Keweenaw County, the Upper Peninsula or other scenic drives.

== Route description ==
The road can be accessed from either Eagle Harbor or Copper Harbor and serves as a scenic loop off M-26. The western end starts at M-26 near Lake Bailey and Agate Harbor. Brockway Mountain Drive ascends along the ridgeline of the Keweenaw Fault. Immediately south of the road, Upson Creek runs parallel to the cliff face as it drains Lake Upson. Two and a half miles (4.0 km) from the western end, there is a parking area for the Oren Krumm Trail, part of the Brockway Mountain Audubon Sanctuary. The drive is lined with low stone walls, built as part of the original construction of the roadway. The roadway lacks markings, and its condition has been described as "deteriorat[ed], probably due to harsh weather" by travel writers.

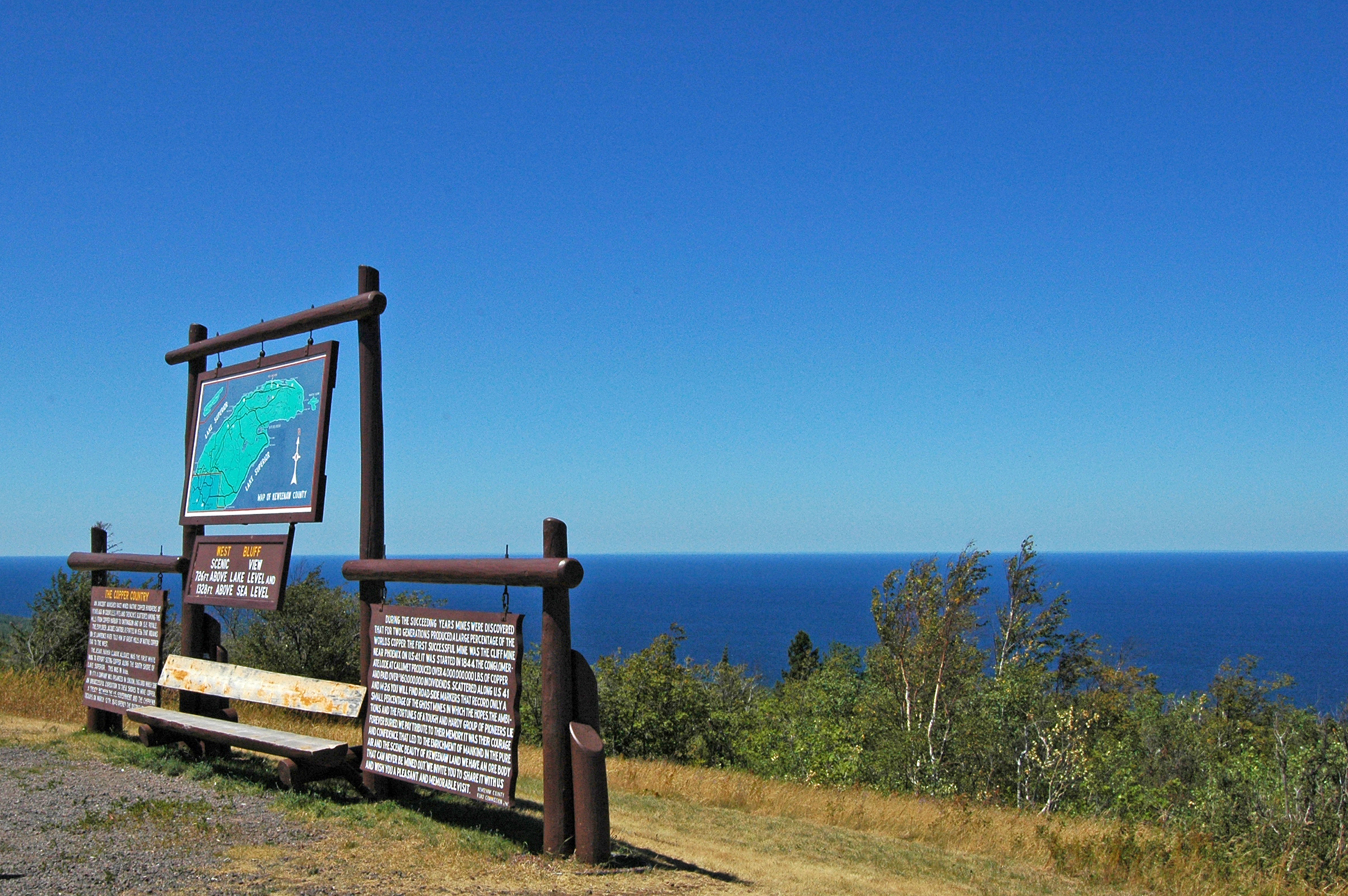
View of Lake Superior from Brockway Mountain with information signage

Upon reaching the top of the mountain, drivers are greeted with a full panoramic view of the surrounding area, allowing views of Lake Superior, Copper Harbor, Eagle Harbor and the surrounding lakes and forests. Freighters occasionally can be seen traversing Lake Superior, and on clear days Isle Royale can be spotted nearly 50 miles (80 km) in the distance.

Continuing eastward, the drive descends down the mountain toward Copper Harbor. The roadway twists and turns as it alternately climbs and descends several smaller hills along the ridgeline. Along the drive, several viewpoints provide the opportunity to pull off and take in the surroundings. A few of them lie directly adjacent to the face of the bluff where the mountain quickly rises from the surrounding land. Near the eastern end, there are two sharp hairpin turns, the first of which has a scenic overlook and parking area. This spot overlooks Copper Harbor and the nearby Copper Country Trail National Scenic Byway portion of US Highway 41 (US 41) just to the east. From here, the road makes its steep descent down from the ridge, through the second turn and ends at M-26 on the western edge of town.

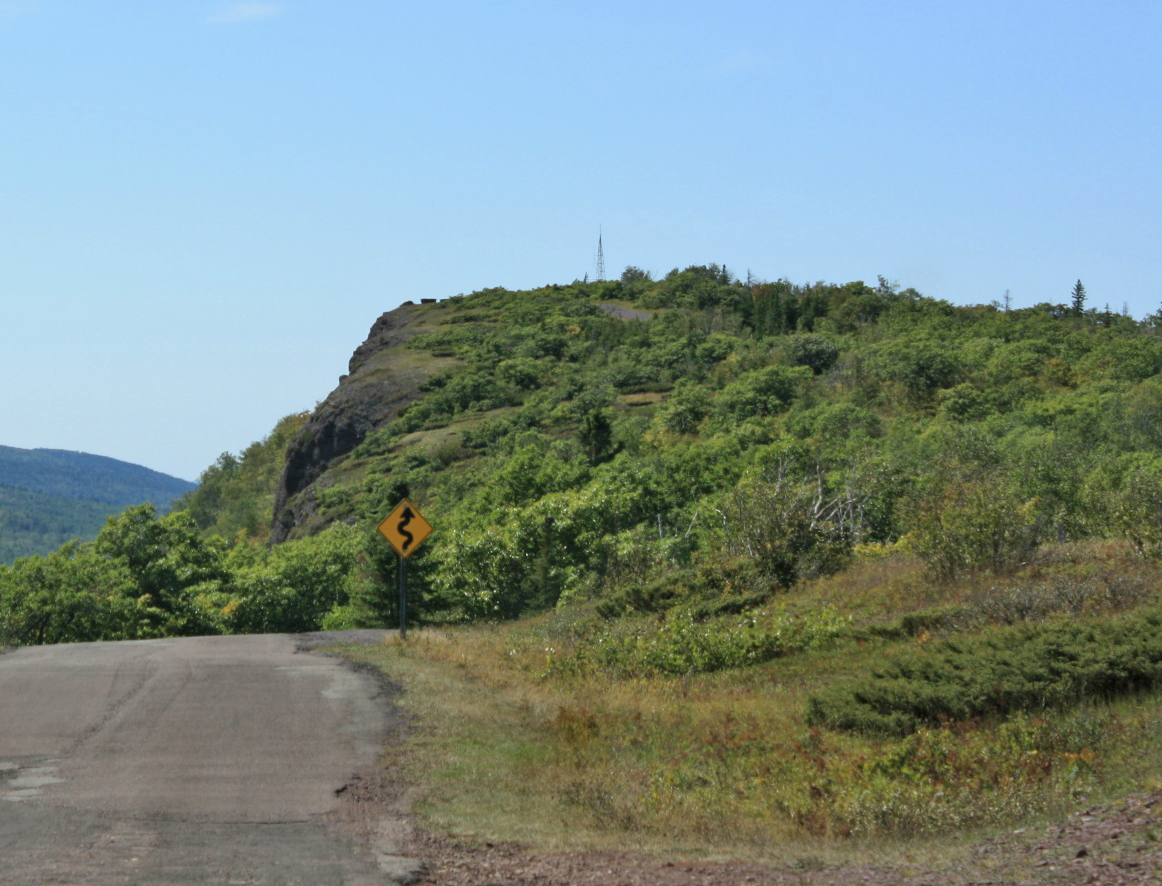
Peak of Brockway Mountain

This road is one of the highest scenic roadways above sea level in the US between the Rocky and Allegheny mountains. During the winter, Brockway Mountain Drive is closed to cars as the Keweenaw County Road Commission does not plow the road; instead the drive is used as a snowmobile trail. According to the commission, 200 vehicles per day use the roadway on average. There are no posted speed limits along the roadway, however in the words of a former Keweenaw County Sheriff's Department deputy, "the nature and design of the road was such that the 'problem' of people driving too fast ... was basically 'self-correcting'."

== History ==
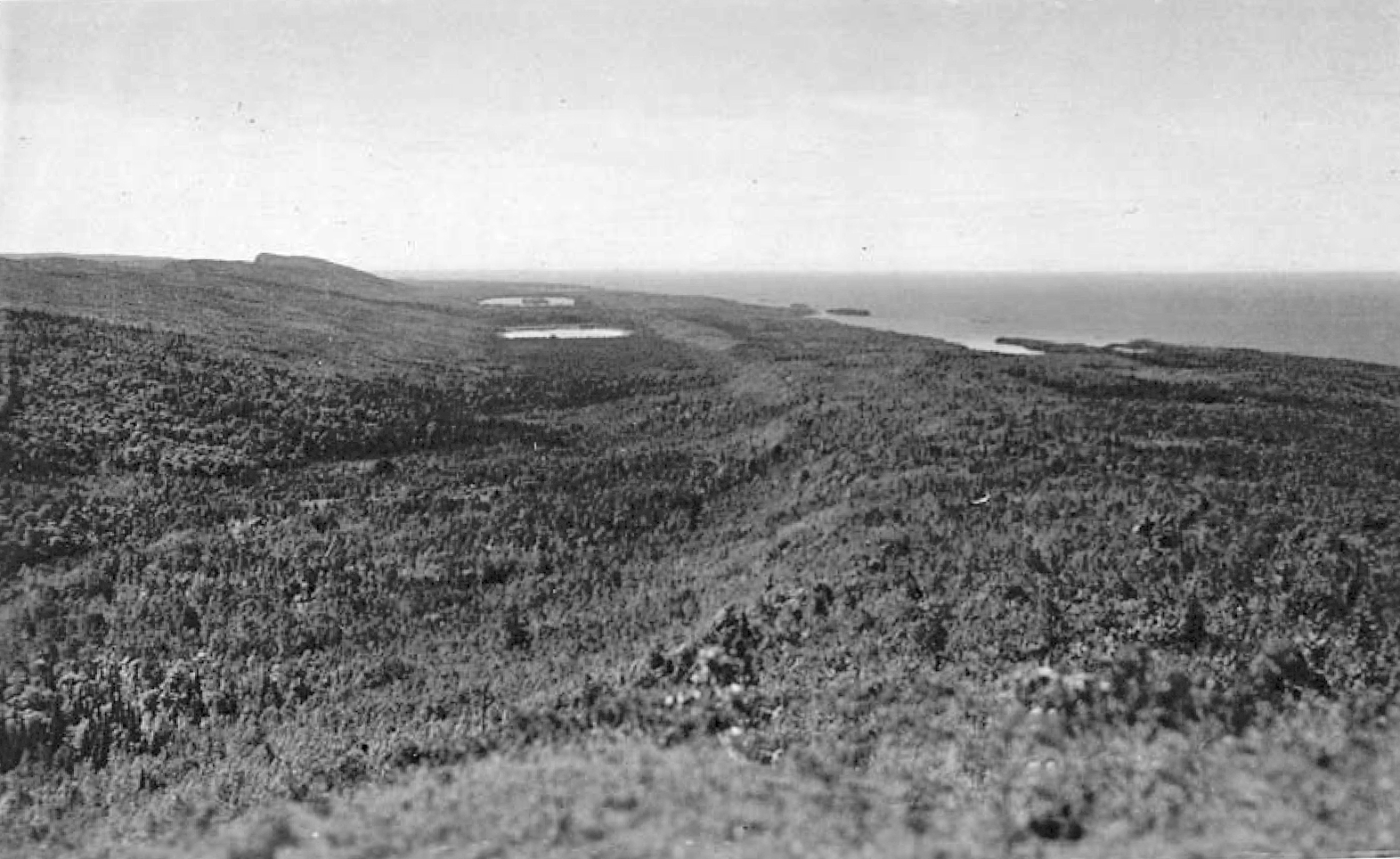
View of Lakes Upson and Bailey before construction of the road, 1933

Brockway Mountain is a 1,320-foot-tall (400 m) volcanic landform on the Keweenaw Peninsula of Michigan about five miles (8.0 km) west of Copper Harbor. The top of the mountain is 720 feet (219 m) above the level of Lake Superior. The peak was named for Daniel D. Brockway, local pioneer settler, postmaster and state road commissioner. Brockway moved to Copper Harbor in 1846 at the beginning of the area's copper boom. He built the first permanent structure in the community, a hostelry named The Brockway House, which was used by the miners and scientists in the area. By the time of his death on May 9, 1899, the ridge west of town had been named in his honor.

A road to the summit of Brockway Mountain was first proposed in the 1920s by Warren H. Manning, a renowned landscape architect. Manning was in the Keweenaw at the time to design Agassiz Park in Calumet and suggested the road while visiting the area. The road was designed in 1932 with three different options considered. The first involved the construction of the current road from near the Silver River on the west to the summit. It followed a route used by the previous Military Road that connected Fort Wilkins to Fort Howard; traffic would have to turn around to descend Brockway Mountain. Another option included a route from the summit southwest across the Upson Creek Valley to a second summit on the nearby Mount Lookout, a total of about 16 miles (26 km). The third option was that of the current route down the mountain to the west.

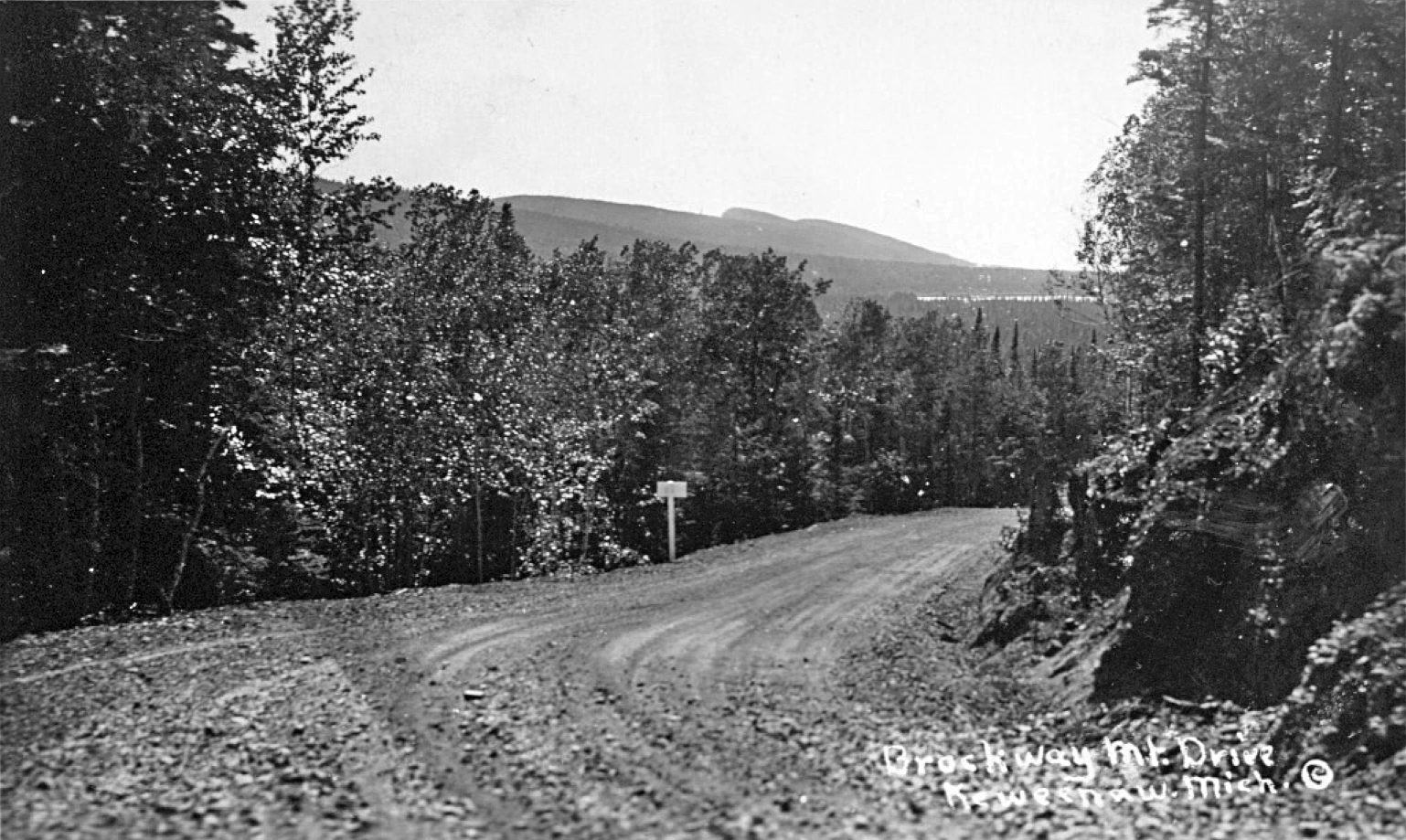
Original, "ball bearing" gravel road surface, 1933–34

Construction of Brockway Mountain Drive began in early 1933 by the Keweenaw County Road Commission with federal highway funding designed to provide meaningful work to the many copper miners who became unemployed during the Great Depression. Rather than provide welfare, the government provided work for the jobless. The Reconstruction Finance Corporation was the agency on the federal level responsible for the project. Up to 300 laborers were employed for a wage of 25¢/hr (equivalent to $6.06/hr in 2024). The work required to build the road was carried out by manual labor, with the assistance of a team of horses, in a project designed to maximize the numbers of men employed. The grading and leveling of the road surface was done by hand; no survey instruments were used to level the roadway. The road was opened for public use that October 14, at a preliminary cost of $30,000 (equivalent to $576,000 in 2024). That same year, the Skytop Inn opened on top of the mountain. During 1934, additional work was done to the roadway to build the stone walls. Motorists were restricted to one-way traffic, and the road was only open to the public on Sundays and holidays. In the interim, the road was temporarily used as a connection between completed segments of the parallel state highway, numbered M-129 at the time. This highway, now part of M-26, was built starting in July 1933 but was not completed through the area until October 1934. The KCRC declared the road initially finished on June 14, 1935, at a cost of $40,000 (equivalent to $718,000 in 2024)

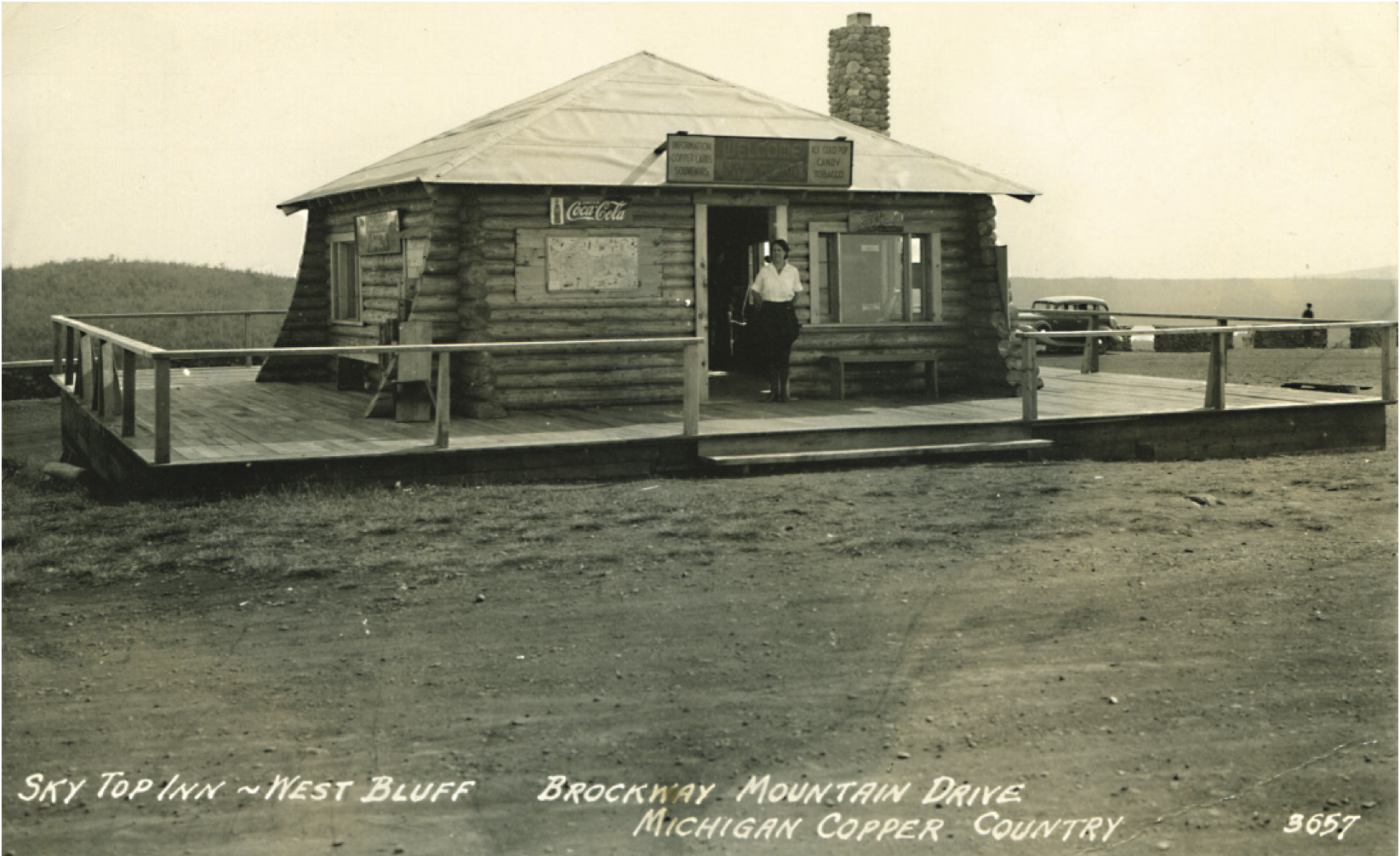
Original Skytop Inn, late 1930s

According to historian LeRoy Barnett, "this county highway quickly became one of the most popular motoring destinations in the Midwest." The Ironwood Daily Globe reported that in December 1938, "at least one million persons" had traveled on Brockway Mountain Drive in the first five years it was open, sparking a tourism boom in the area. The eastern end of the roadway was paved in 1938, with the final two miles (3.2 km) done in 1940. The first Skytop Inn was built at the summit of Brockway Mountain in 1935. A replacement structure was built in 1965. During the winters of 1946/47 and 1947/48, a ski hill was operated down the roadway on the western end.

In February 2013, Eagle Harbor Township purchased 320 acres (130 ha) at the top of Brockway Mountain with plans to refit the Skytop Inn to serve as a visitors center. The building was the oldest gift shop in Keweenaw County and owned by the same family from the time of its construction until it was sold in 2013. The following August, Governor Rick Snyder helped to dedicate the summit as part of the Keweenaw Coastal Wildlife Corridor, a protected area in the raptors' annual migration flight path. The area is now owned by the township after assistance by The Nature Conservancy and local donors.

== Scenic opportunities ==
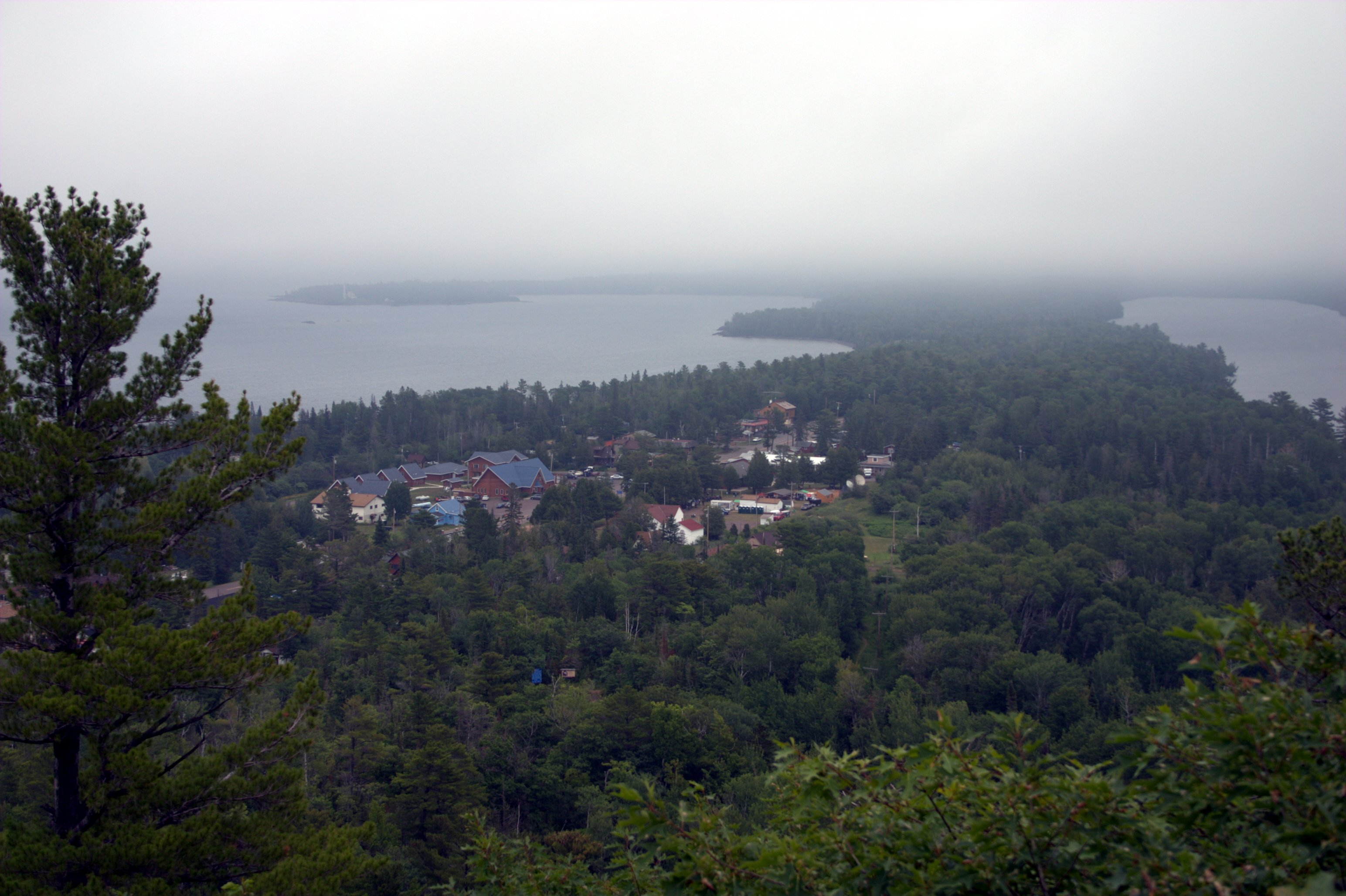
View of Copper Harbor (left) and Lake Fanny Hooe (right) from the easternmost overlook

During the spring, particularly in April, hawks migrate along the length of the Keweenaw Peninsula headed across Lake Superior. They flock together along the cliffs and ridges of Brockway Mountain. The top of the mountain is a semi-alpine climate with strong winds, and guide books advise visitors to bring windbreaker jackets, even in the summer. The peak is also known as an excellent star-gazing location because there are no electric lights to interrupt the darkness. The surrounding mountainsides are privately owned, mostly by Champion International Paper. The company receives reduced taxes in exchange for keeping the land open for recreational uses. The Michigan Nature Association owns 200 acres (81 ha) of property on Brockway Mountain itself. There are over 700 species of flowers including trillium and orchids. The peak bloom is in June, and some of the wildflowers on display are not found elsewhere in the state. Motorcycle Cruiser magazine featured a piece on Copper Harbor in February 2010 that suggested visiting Brockway Mountain at dawn saying that "the vista at the peak is amazing and it's worth the early morning rise." The area is renowned as a fall foliage destination; color season starts by the second week of September and ends in October.

== Awards and recognition ==
Many locales in the Keweenaw Peninsula are frequently praised for their beauty and pristine appearances and Brockway Mountain Drive is no exception. The road has been recognized in numerous publications, dating back to the 1950s. The Milwaukee Sentinel profiled the "famous Brockway Mountain Drive" in 1956 in an article about a tourism boom to the region. More attention was focused on the roadway when Milwaukee's other newspaper, the Milwaukee Journal, spotlighted the region in 1961 stating, "the road along the Brockway Mountain fault follows the Keweenaw Peninsula 700 ft [210 m] above Lake Superior, past ghost copper mines [toward] restored Fort Wilkins".

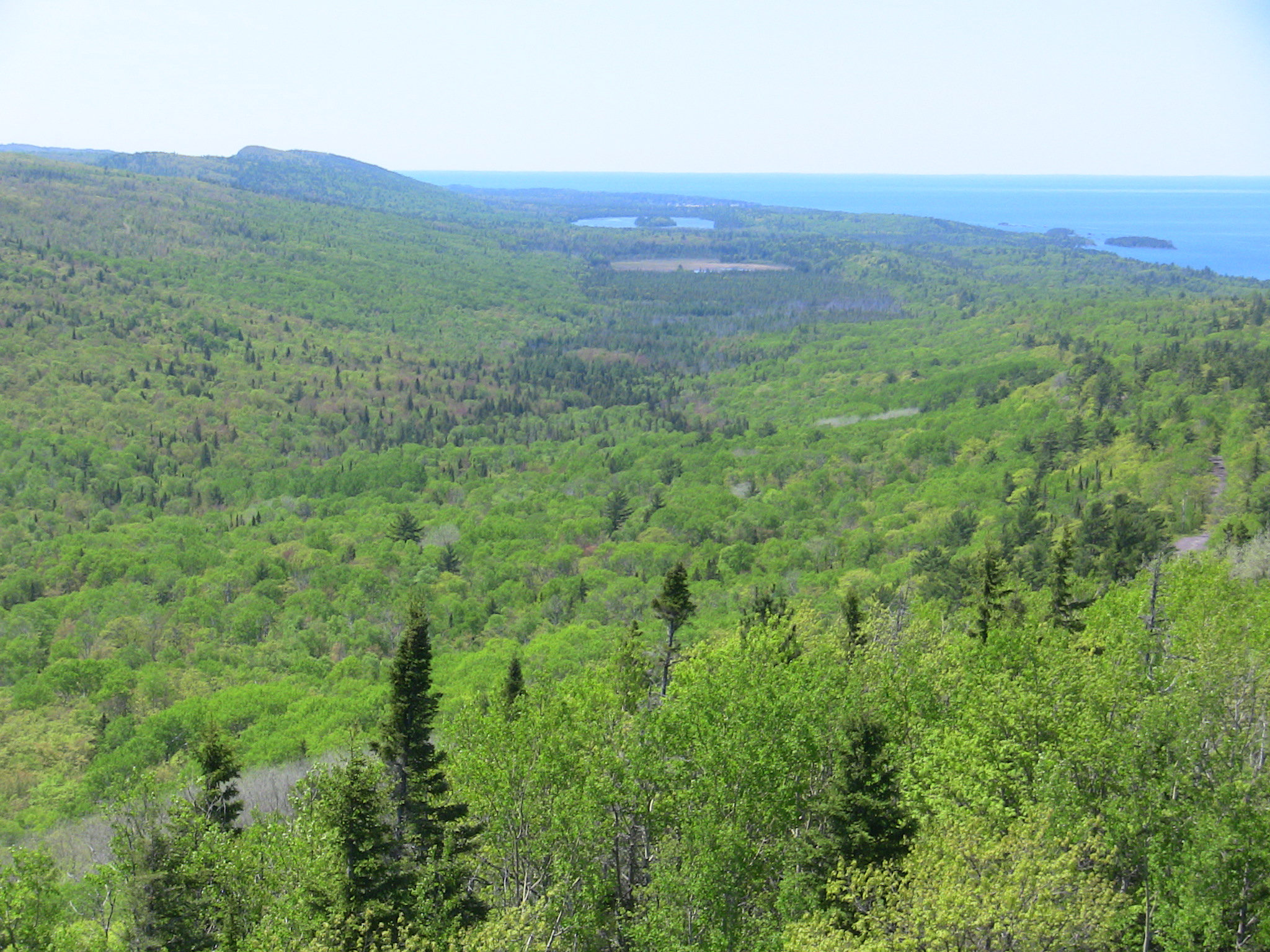
View to the west from Brockway Mountain, with Lakes Upson, Bailey, and Superior in the distance

The New York Times had similar praise in 1962, saying "a side trip that should not be missed is the Brockway Mountain Drive ... for a panoramic view of the forest and the blue waters of Lake Superior." The Chicago Tribune called the overlook "breathtaking" in 1986, and the Chicago Sun-Times said that fall color views from Brockway "rival[ed] any in New England" in 1990. The Pioneer Press of St. Paul profiled the area in 2005 saying that the tourists "cruise along Brockway Mountain Drive, renowned for fall color." The staff of MLive, the online news presence of Booth Newspapers in Michigan, highlighted the height of the roadway, the view to Isle Royale, and the birdwatching opportunities in a profile of the area in 2007.

In April 1994 and April 2001, the route along US 41 and Brockway Mountain Drive was selected as "one of the best fall color views and mountain biking areas" by Michigan Living. It was also named the "most beautiful bike ride in the United States" by Bicycling magazine in February 1995. The Star Tribune in Minneapolis said that a visit to the drive "is worth the whole trip by itself, with a twisting road leading up to the crest, with panoramic views of fall colors." The drive was also included in the coverage of the Copper Country Trail, a designation applied to the neighboring US 41 by the Federal Highway Administration as a part of the National Scenic Byway program. NBC's Today featured Brockway Mountain Drive in September 2007 as part of a segment on "great and unusual fall foliage destinations". In May 2010, local residents of the Upper Peninsula chose the road as the region's "favorite natural wonder" in a poll conducted by WLUC-TV. Brockway Mountain Drive was added to the National Register of Historic Places on July 24, 2017.

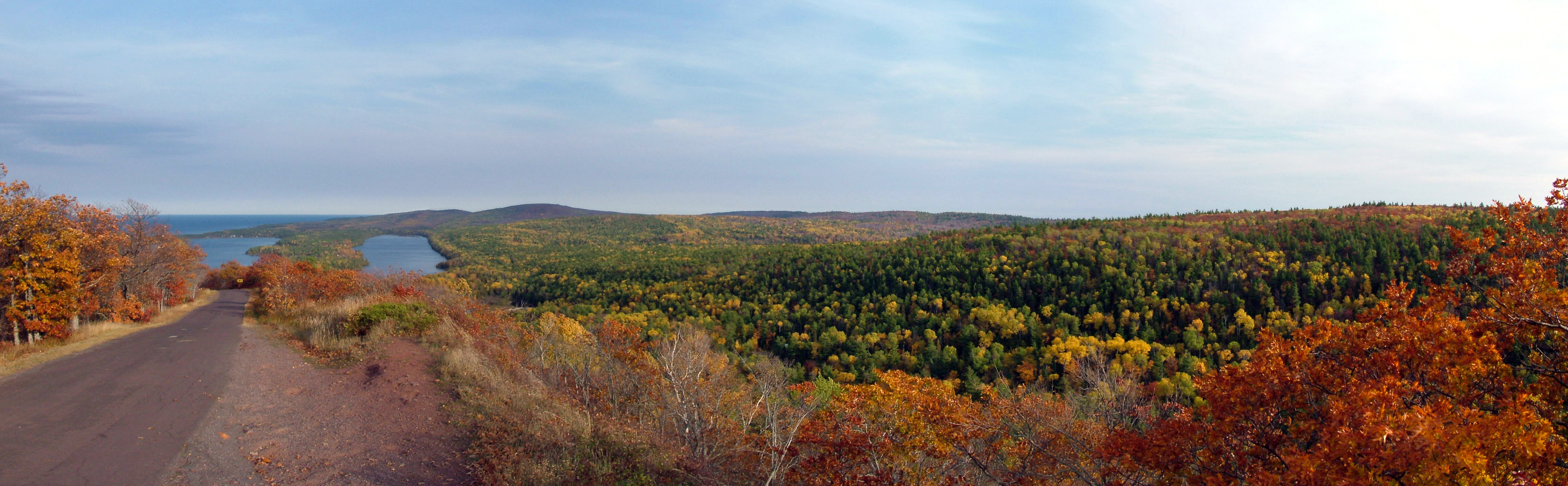
View from atop Brockway Mountain

== Major intersections ==
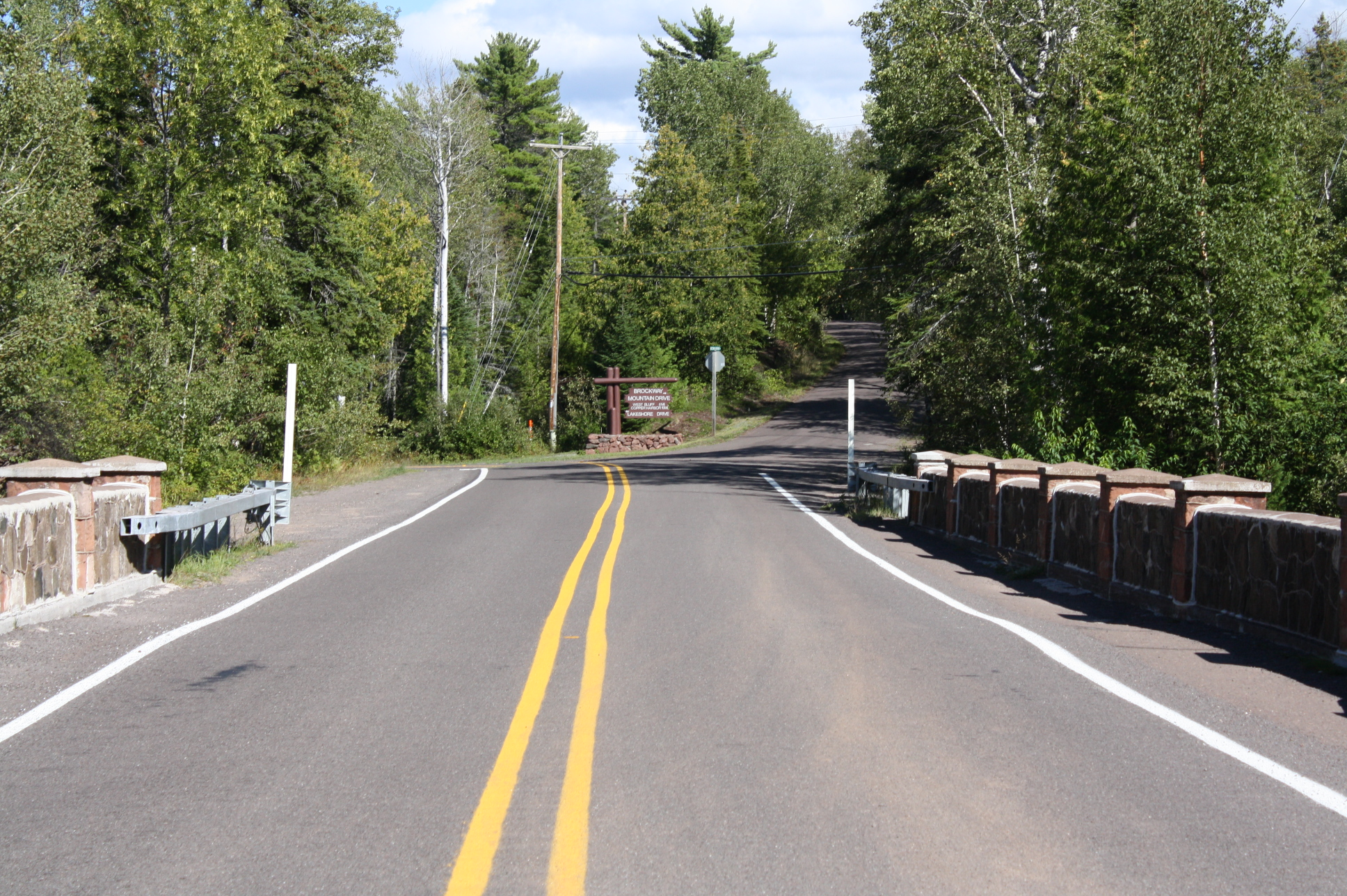
Western terminus near the M-26–Silver River Culvert (foreground)

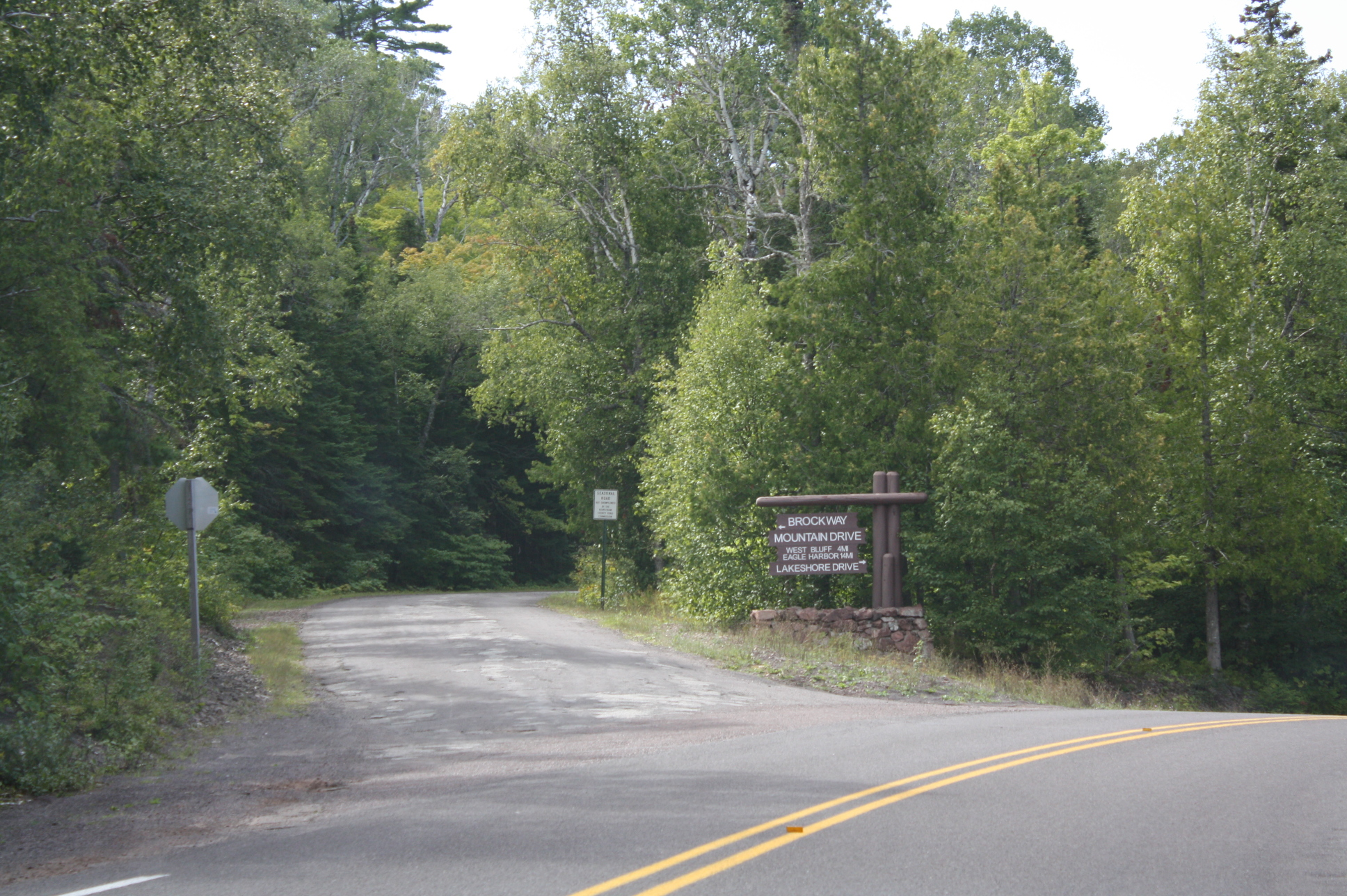
Eastern terminus near Copper Harbor

The entire road is in Keweenaw County.

| Location | mi | km | Destinations | Notes |
|---|---|---|---|---|
| Eagle Harbor Township | 0.000 | 0.000 | M-26 / LSCT – Eagle Harbor | Western terminus |
| Eagle Harbor Township | 4.920 | 7.918 | Parking area | At the peak of Brockway Mountain |
| Grant Township | 8.883 | 14.296 | M-26 / LSCT – Copper Harbor | Eastern terminus |
1.000 mi = 1.609 km; 1.000 km = 0.621 mi

== See also ==
- Pierce Stocking Scenic Drive, a similar scenic drive in the Sleeping Bear Dunes National Lakeshore
- River Road National Scenic Byway, another county-maintained scenic byway in the Huron National Forest
