= Lake Medora (Michigan) =

Lake in the state of Michigan, United States

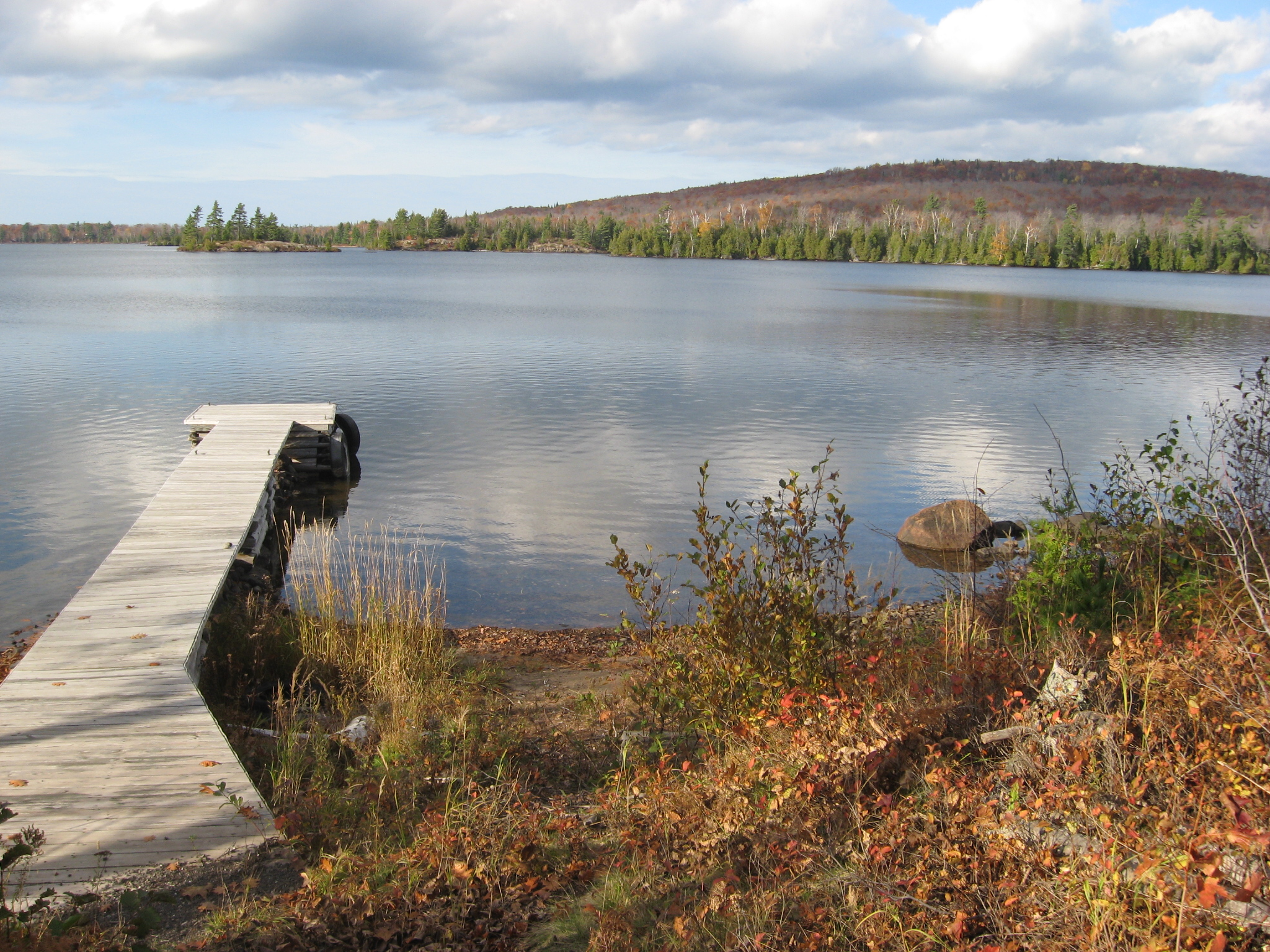

- Location within Michigan
- Location: Keweenaw County, Michigan
- Coordinates: 47°26′30″N 87°59′00″W
- Basin countries: United States
- Surface area: 700 acres (280 ha)
- Surface elevation: 1,017 feet (310 m)

Lake Medora is a lake located on US Highway 41 in Keweenaw County, Michigan, near Grant and Eagle Harbor Townships. It is approximately 700 acres (2.8 km^{2}), with islands. It is approximately 4.5 miles (7.2 km) from Copper Harbor. The majority of the lake has water depths below 25 feet.

== See also ==
- List of lakes in Michigan
