= Delaware, Michigan =

- Unincorporated community
- Location within the state of Michigan
- Coordinates: 47°25′16″N 88°05′45″W
- Country: United States
- State: Michigan
- County: Keweenaw
- Township: Grant
- Elevation: 1,109 ft (338 m)
- Time zone: UTC-5 (Eastern (EST))
  - Summer (DST): UTC-4 (EDT)
- Area code: 906
- GNIS feature ID: 624524

Delaware is an unincorporated community in Grant Township in Keweenaw County in the U.S. state of Michigan. It was established in 1846 as a copper mining town. It is located in the Keweenaw Peninsula, ten miles south of Copper Harbor and around twenty five miles north of Calumet. When the town was first settled it had a population of one hundred and rose to a population close to 1200 during full operation. When the town first started out the mining companies brought everything including housing, mining buildings, schools, grocery store, and a church. Today all that is left is a mining tour and foundations of old mining buildings. This is mostly because there were no other jobs and the location of the town is in a very remote location. The town made attempts to survive but in the end did not make it. The Bete Grise Light is located in the area.

Delaware is recognized as the "Snow Capital of the Midwest". The Keweenaw County Road Commission maintains an unofficial record of snowfall at this location. The annual average, dating back to 1910, is around 240 inches. This is largely a result of Lake-effect snow. This average is the greatest of any location in the Great Lakes snow belts. For the entire U.S. east of the Rocky Mountains, only select mountainous locations in New England receive more snow. In the winter of 1978–79, the Delaware station measured a record 390 inches of snow. Measurements are taken once per day at this station. Official National Weather Service stations measure snowfall every six hours. This procedural difference leads to systematic underestimation of snowfall at Delaware due to compaction of the new snow over the 24-hour period. Helping to illustrate this point, Mount Bohemia, a ski resort in nearby Lac La Belle, Michigan, reports an annual average of 273 inches.
