= Fort Wilkins Historic State Park =

Park in Michigan, United States

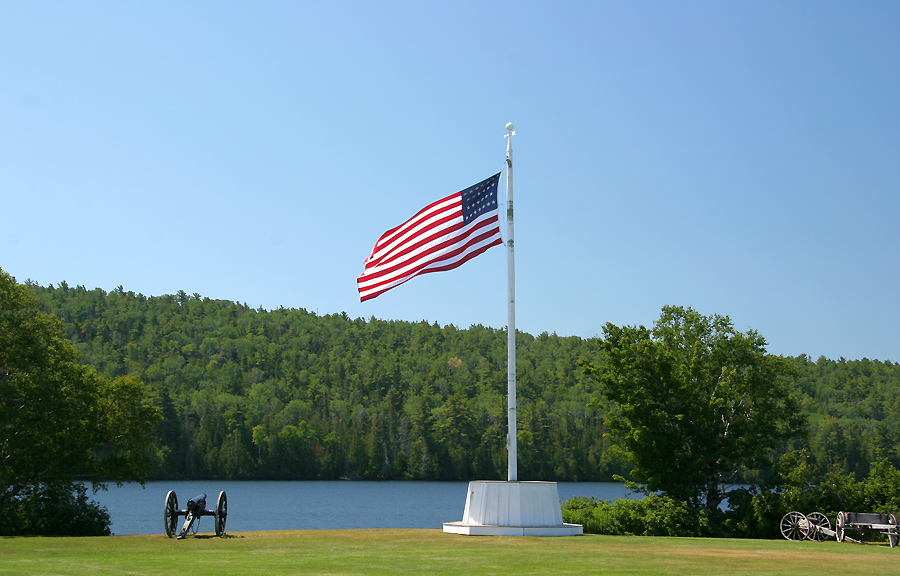
- Flagpole in front of Lake Fanny Hooe at Fort Wilkins

- Location within Michigan Location within the United States
- Location: Grant Township, Keweenaw County, Michigan, United States
- Nearest city: Copper Harbor, Michigan
- Coordinates: 47°28′02″N 87°52′11″W
- Area: 987 acres (399 ha)
- Elevation: 620 feet (190 m)
- Established: 1923
- Administrator: Michigan Department of Natural Resources
- Designation: Michigan state park
- Website: Official website
- Fort Wilkins
- U.S. National Register of Historic Places
- Michigan State Historic Site
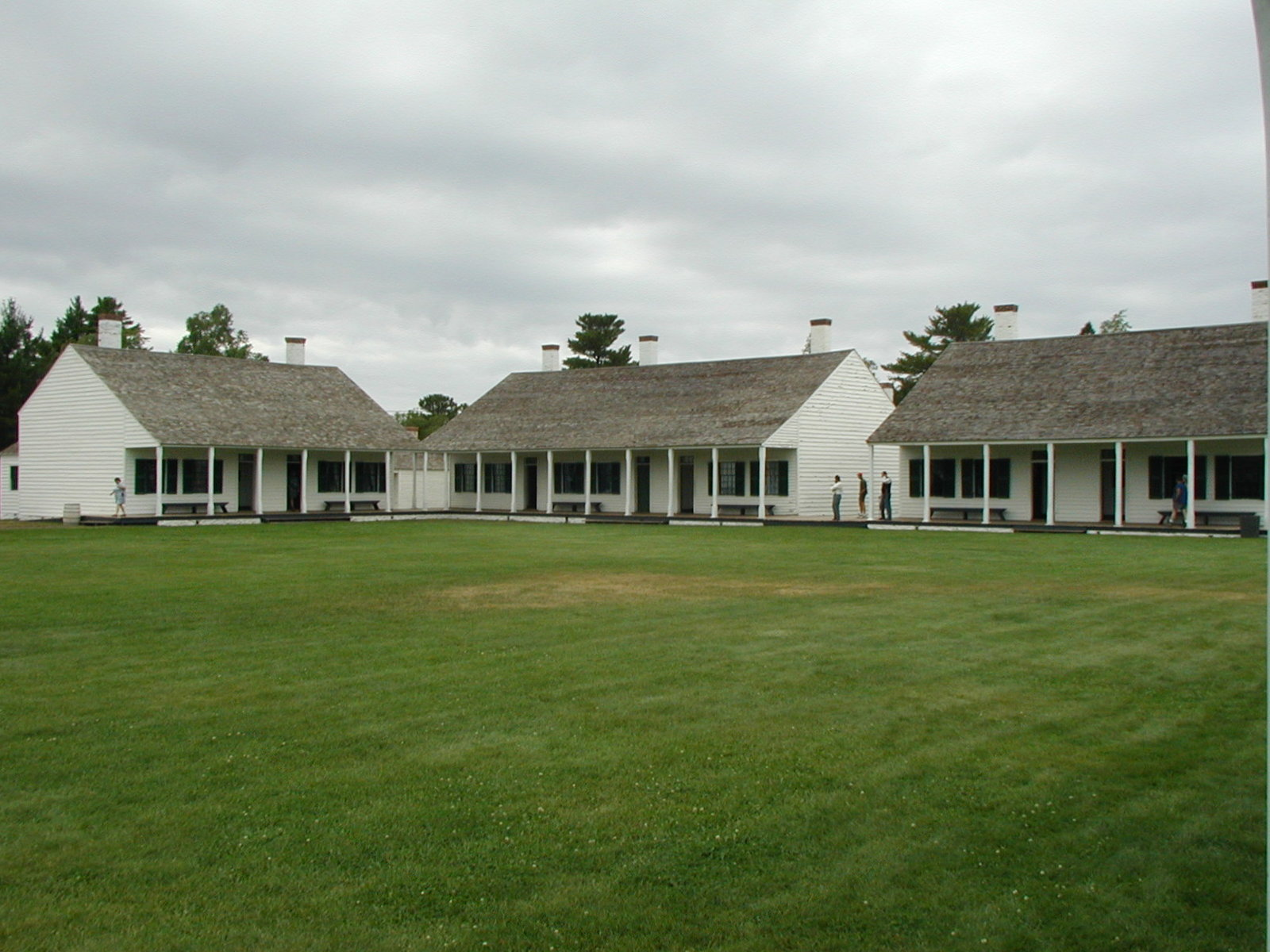
- Officer Quarters
- Location: Fort Wilkins State Park
- Built: 1844
- NRHP reference No.: 70000279
- Added to NRHP: July 8, 1970

Fort Wilkins Historic State Park is a historic preservation and public recreation area operated by the Michigan Department of Natural Resources at Copper Harbor, Michigan. The park preserves the restored 1844 army military outpost, Fort Wilkins, which was placed on the National Register of Historic Places in 1970. The state park's 987 acres (399 ha) include camping and day-use facilities as well as the Copper Harbor Lighthouse, built in 1866. The park is a "Cooperating Site" of the Keweenaw National Historical Park.

== History ==
Copper Harbor is located at the northern tip of the Keweenaw Peninsula, bordering Lake Superior. It is one of the best natural harbors in Keweenaw County and was a quick focus of attention after copper was discovered on the peninsula in the 1830s. In the early 1840s, a copper rush took place that saw a flood of fortune-seekers moving to the peninsula. The U.S. government was concerned about possible disorder and violence, and lake shipping interests asked the government to build an aid to navigation so that essential supplies could be shipped in and the copper moved out. In 1844, Fort Wilkins was established at the direction of Secretary of War William Wilkins.

=== Fort Wilkins ===
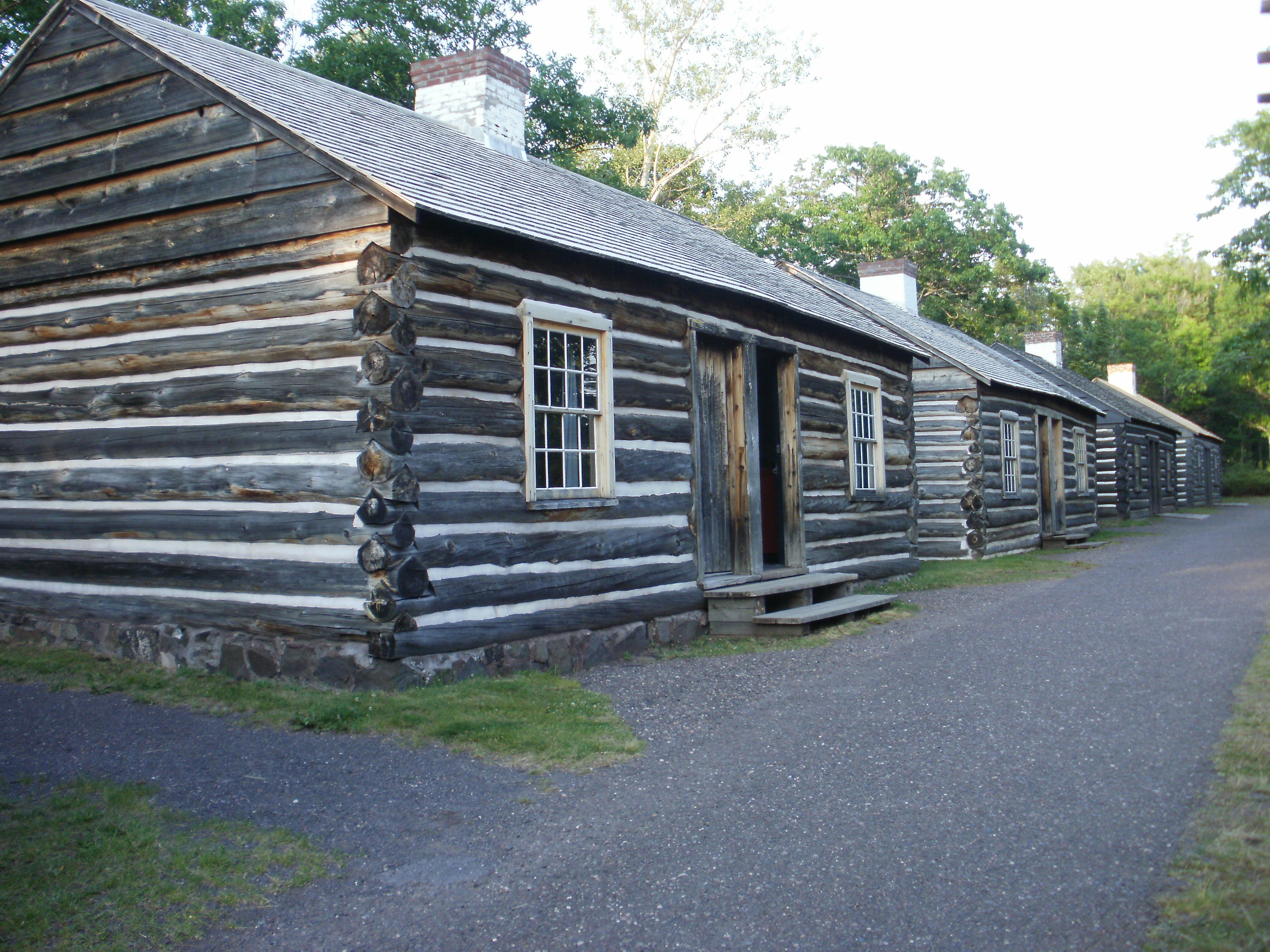
Married Enlisted Soldiers Quarters

The U.S. Army occupied Fort Wilkins, located east of Copper Harbor, Michigan on the strait of land between Copper Harbor and northern shore of Lake Fanny Hooe, in 1844. The troops stationed there were intended to help with local law enforcement and to keep the peace between miners and the local Ojibwas; some Chippewa opposed the Treaty of La Pointe that had ceded the area to the United States in 1842–1843.

However, the fort proved to be unnecessary. The Chippewa largely accepted the influx, and the miners were law-abiding. The Army built 27 structures, including a guardhouse, powder magazine, 7 officer's quarters, two barracks, two mess halls, hospital, storehouse, sutler's store, quartermaster's store, bakery, blacksmith's shop, carpenter's shop, icehouse, four quarters for married enlisted men, stables, and a slaughter house, to house the operations of two full-strength infantry companies. Several of these structures still survive. Others have been rebuilt following archaeological excavations.

When it was first garrisoned in 1844, two companies (A and B of the 5th infantry) were stationed there. When war was declared with Mexico, Companies A and B were sent to Texas and were replaced by Company K. When Company K was also sent to the Mexican front in 1846, the fort was left in the hands of a single caretaker, Sgt. William Wright, the only man to remain behind.

With the passing of Wright in 1855, the fort was leased to Dr. John S. Livermore, who hoped to open a health resort "for invalids and others during the hot months." This plan fell through after his death in 1861.

In 1863, the United States government granted land to the States of Michigan and Wisconsin for construction of a military road between Fort Wilikins and Fort Howard near Green Bay, Wisconsin. This road was completed in 1872.

After the American Civil War, the U.S. army reoccupied Fort Wilkins for three years in 1867–1870. The U.S. Army needed a place for men to serve out the rest of their enlistments from the war. Company E, Forty-third Infantry, was stationed there from 1867 until May 1869, when they were replaced by Company K, First Infantry. The army permanently abandoned the facility at the end of August 1870.

=== State park ===
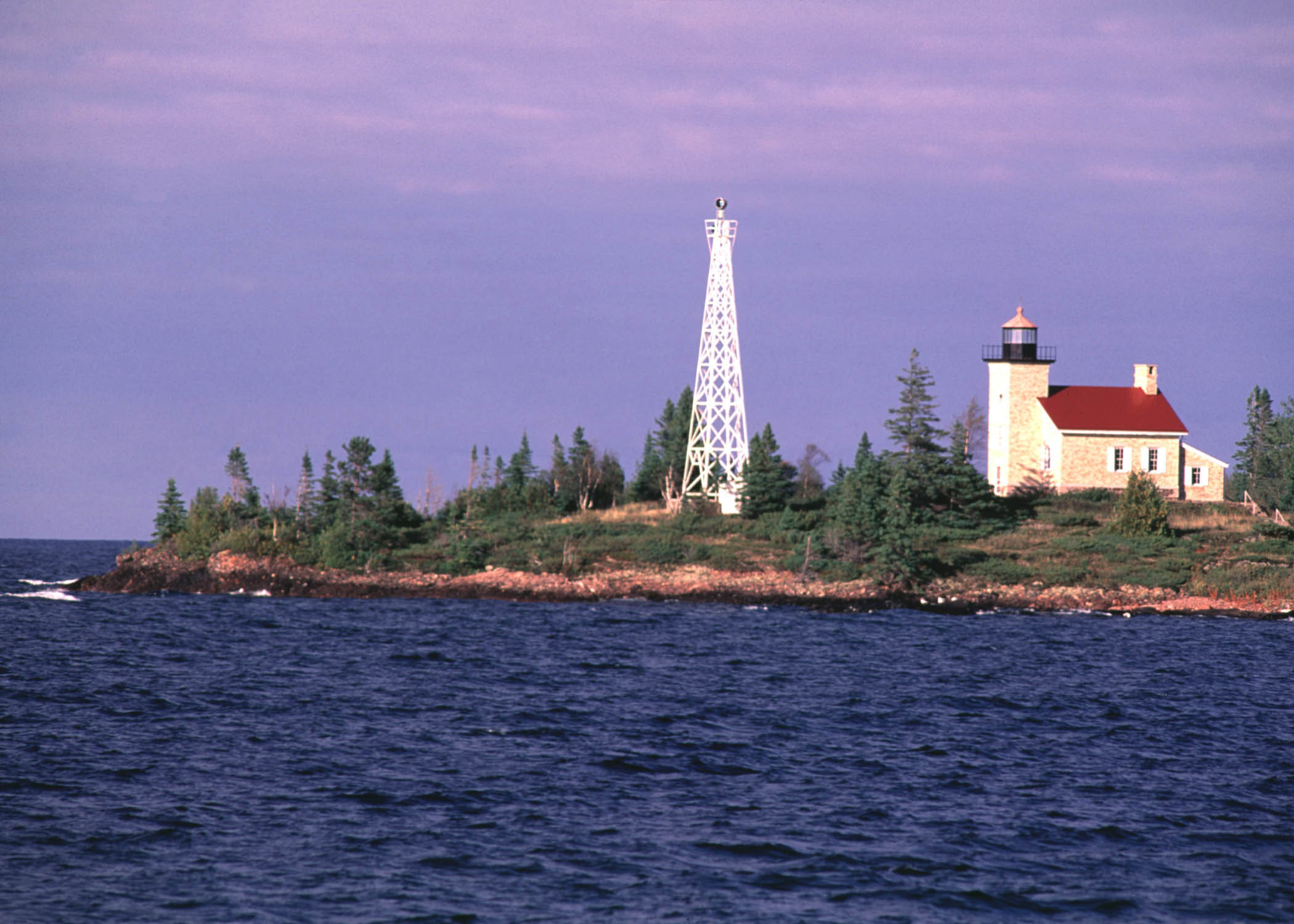
Copper Harbor Lighthouse complex

In 1848, the Copper Harbor Lighthouse complex was begun on the tip of the eastern point of land, also sometimes called Hays Point, that sits at the entrance of the harbor. In 1923, the fort and adjacent lighthouse became a Michigan state park. The facility is open to the public in summer months, when it is staffed by costumed personnel who portray Army life during the fort's final summer as an active post. The park also offers camping, fishing, paddling, swimming and a 2.5-mile (4.0 km) trail for hiking, mountain biking, and cross-country skiing.

== See also ==
- Copper mining in Michigan
