= Grant Township, Keweenaw County, Michigan =

Grant Township, Michigan
- Civil township
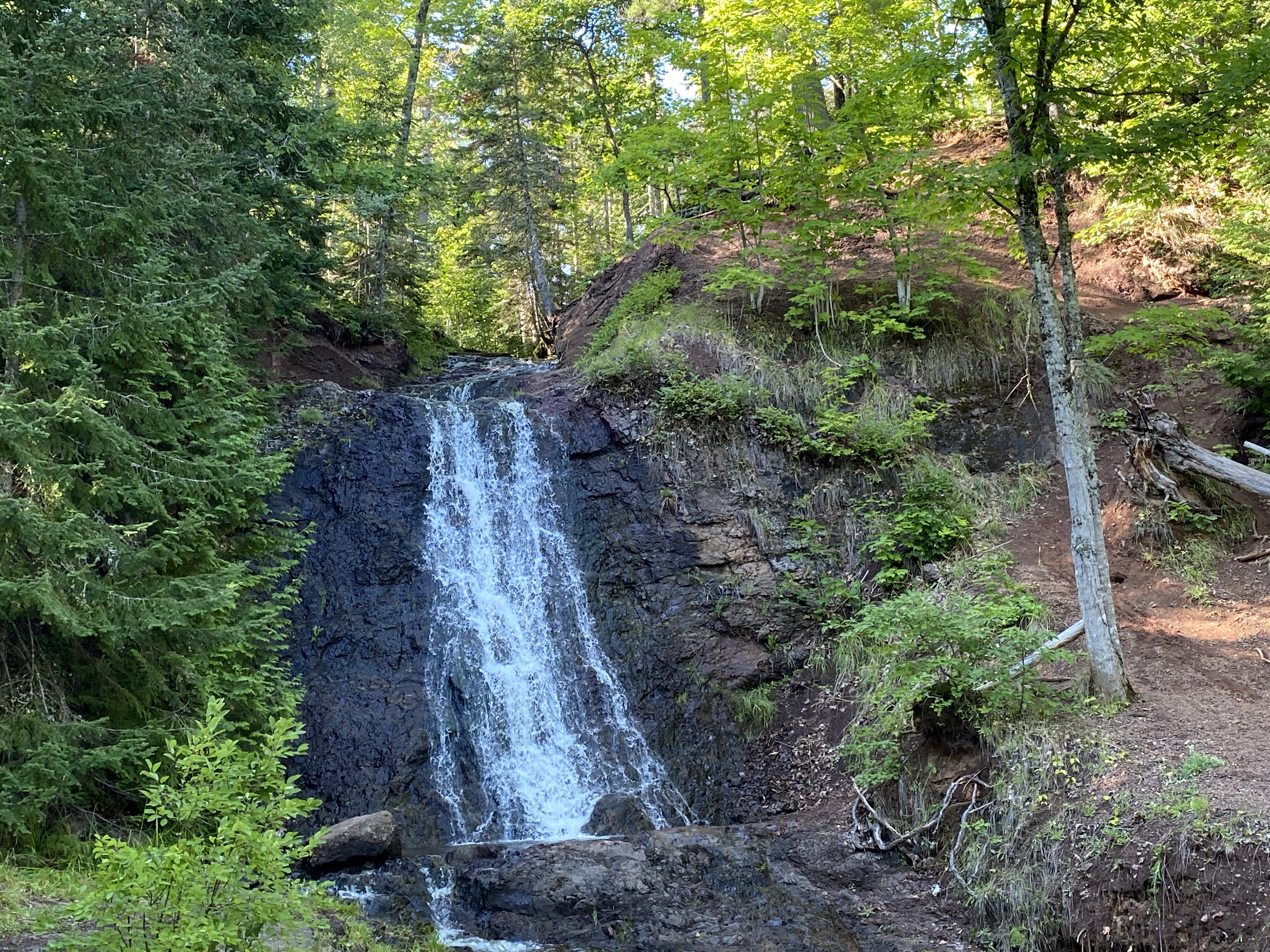
- Haven Falls near Lac La Belle

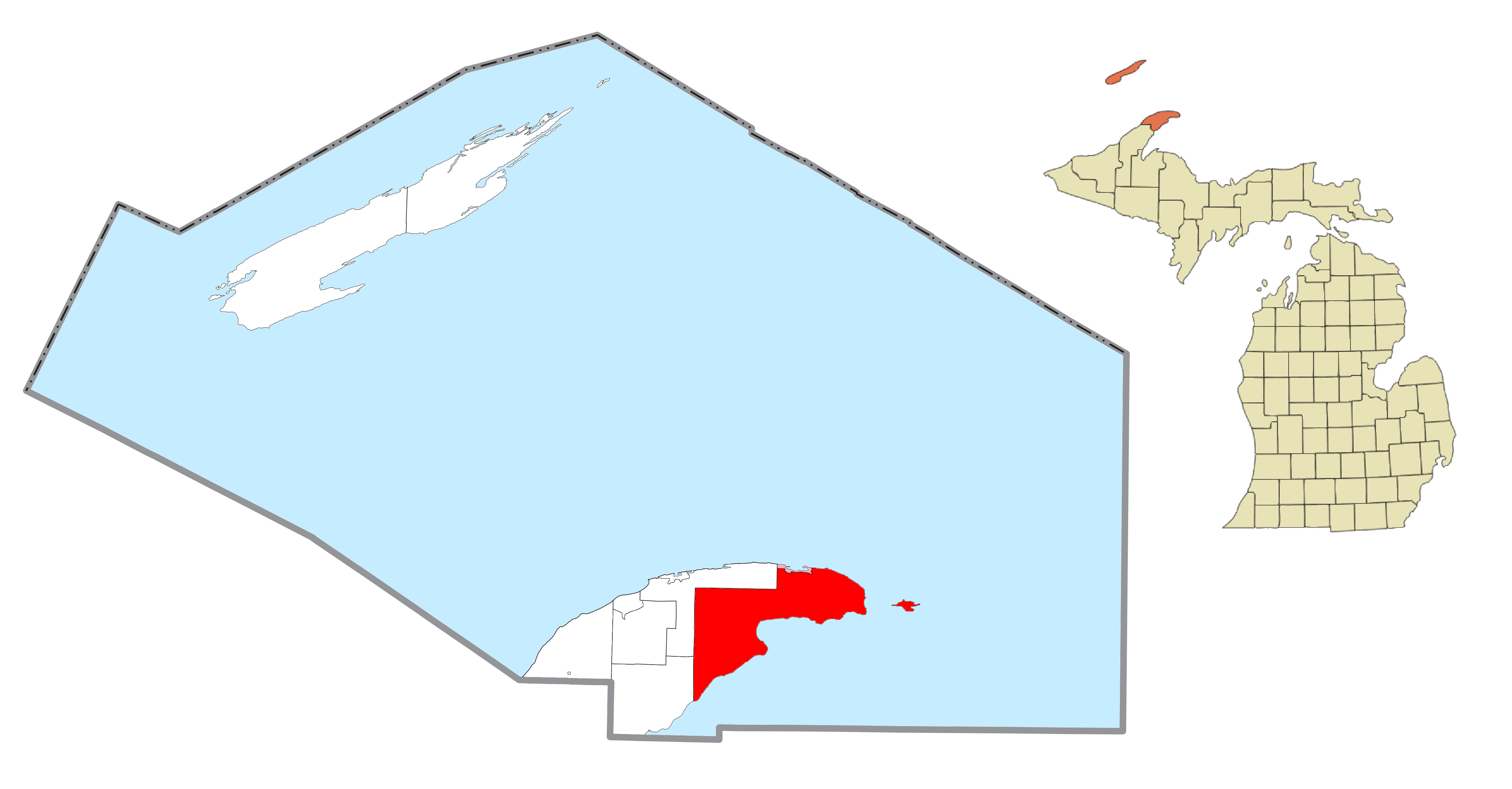
- Location within Keweenaw County (red) and the administered CDP of Copper Harbor (pink)

- Location within the state of Michigan Location within the United States
- Coordinates: 47°24′28″N 87°57′43″W
- Country: United States
- State: Michigan
- County: Keweenaw
- Established: 1861

Government
  - Supervisor: Scott Wendt
  - Clerk: Greg Mielcarz

Area
  - Total: 202.73 sq mi (525.07 km^{2})
  - Land: 119.20 sq mi (308.73 km^{2})
  - Water: 83.53 sq mi (216.34 km^{2})
- Elevation: 659 ft (201 m)

Population (2020)
  - Total: 275
  - Density: 2.31/sq mi (0.89/km^{2})
- Time zone: UTC-5 (Eastern (EST))
  - Summer (DST): UTC-4 (EDT)
- ZIP code(s): 49918 (Copper Harbor); 49950 (Mohawk)
- Area code: 906
- FIPS code: 26-34300
- GNIS feature ID: 1626381
- Website: Official website

Grant Township is a civil township of Keweenaw County in the U.S. state of Michigan. The population was 275 at the 2020 census. Grant Township is one of the most isolated municipalities in Michigan, as it forms the tip of the Keweenaw Peninsula, which projects into Lake Superior.

== History ==
Grant Township was one of the original townships of Keweenaw County, which was organized in 1861. At the time, Grant Township occupied a much smaller centralized area of the county. The township soon expanded and absorbed the townships of Sibley and Copper Harbor, which are now defunct but can be seen on an 1873 map of Keweenaw County.

The Keweenaw Rocket Range, located within the township at the easternmost tip of the Keweenaw Peninsula, was used by NASA as a rocket launch site from 1964 until 1971.

== Geography ==
According to the U.S. Census Bureau, the township has a total area of 202.73 square miles (525.07 km^{2}), of which 119.20 square miles (308.73 km^{2}) is land and 83.53 square miles (216.34 km^{2}) (41.20%) is water.

Grant Township is located at the northern end of the Keweenaw Peninsula along Lake Superior, and the township has the northernmost point of mainland in the state of Michigan. The township contains Fort Wilkins Historic State Park, and the community of Copper Harbor also provides the main ferry access to Isle Royale National Park via the Isle Royale Queen IV. The Montreal River flows through the township, and the township contains numerous lakes, most notably Lac La Belle, Lake Fanny Hooe, and a part of Lake Gratiot.

There are several lighthouses located within Grant Township, including Copper Harbor Light (and Copper Harbor Front Range Light), Gull Rock Light Station, Manitou Island Light Station, and Mendota (Bete Grise) Light. The township includes three islands: Gull Rock, Manitou Island, and Porters Island.

=== Major highways ===
- US 41 is a lengthy U.S. Highway that has its northern terminus within the township.
- M-26 is a state highway that briefly enters the northwest corner of the township before having its northern terminus at US 41 in Copper Harbor.
- Brockway Mountain Drive is a scenic roadway that briefly enters the western edge of the township before ending at M-26 in Copper Harbor.

=== Communities ===
- Bete Grise is an unincorporated community located within the township at 47°23′20″N 87°57′18″W. It is also the center of the Bete Grise Nature Preserve.
- Betsy is an unincorporated community at the south end of the township at 47°17′49″N 88°03′30″W.
- Copper Harbor is an unincorporated community and census-designated place located at the northern end of the township at 47°28′08″N 87°53′18″W. It is the northernmost community in the state with a year-round population.
- Delaware is an unincorporated community in the western portion of the township along U.S. Route 41 at 47°25′16″N 88°05′45″W.
- Lac La Belle is an unincorporated community located at 47°23′04″N 88°01′07″W. It is located along the lake of the same name, which is part of the Little Gratiot River.
- Mandan is an unincorporated community located along U.S. Route 41 at 47°25′30″N 88°00′56″W.
- Wyoming is an unincorporated community located along the Montreal River at 47°25′04″N 88°04′57″W. Wyoming was platted in 1862 on the site of an old stamping mill.

== Demographics ==
According to the census of 2000, there were 172 people, 87 households, and 52 families residing in the township. The population density was 1.4 inhabitants per square mile (0.54/km^{2}). There were 480 housing units at an average density of 4.0 per square mile (1.5/km^{2}). The racial makeup of the township was 98.84% White, and 1.16% from two or more races. Hispanic or Latino of any race were 0.58% of the population. 38.5% were of Finnish, 8.5% German, 7.7% French, 6.2% Irish and 5.4% Scots-Irish ancestry.

There were 87 households, out of which 12.6% had children under the age of 18 living with them, 55.2% were married couples living together, 2.3% had a female householder with no husband present, and 40.2% were non-families. 33.3% of all households were made up of individuals, and 12.6% had someone living alone who was 65 years of age or older. The average household size was 1.98 and the average family size was 2.48.

In the township the population was spread out, with 11.6% under the age of 18, 3.5% from 18 to 24, 14.5% from 25 to 44, 43.6% from 45 to 64, and 26.7% who were 65 years of age or older. The median age was 54 years. For every 100 females, there were 115.0 males. For every 100 females age 18 and over, there were 111.1 males.

The median income for a household in the township was $34,464, and the median income for a family was $46,250. Males had a median income of $33,750 versus $27,917 for females. The per capita income for the township was $24,336. About 11.4% of families and 10.8% of the population were below the poverty line, including 25.0% of those under the age of eighteen and 7.0% of those 65 or over.

== Education ==
The entire township is served conterminously by its own public school district, the Grant Township School District Number 2. The district operates a single one-room schoolhouse, Copper Harbor School, which serves students from kindergarten to eighth grade. The school was established in 1850 and continues to operate a small school with a very small student population. It is one of the smallest districts by enrollment in the state, as it recorded only 10 students for the 2020–21 school year with one teacher.

== Recreation ==
- Brockway Mountain Drive, a historic scenic route that runs briefly through the western edge of the township
- Copper Harbor Cemetery, a historic cemetery dating back to 1853
- Copper Harbor Light, an active lighthouse first built in 1848
- Fort Wilkins, a deactivated military base that operated from 1844 to 1870
- Gull Rock Light Station, an active lighthouse first activated in 1867
- Keweenaw Mountain Lodge and Golf Course Complex, a resort complex built during the Great Depression
- Manitou Island Light Station, an active lighthouse dating back to 1850
- US 41–Fanny Hooe Creek Bridge, a bridge built along U.S. Route 41 in 1928

== Gallery ==
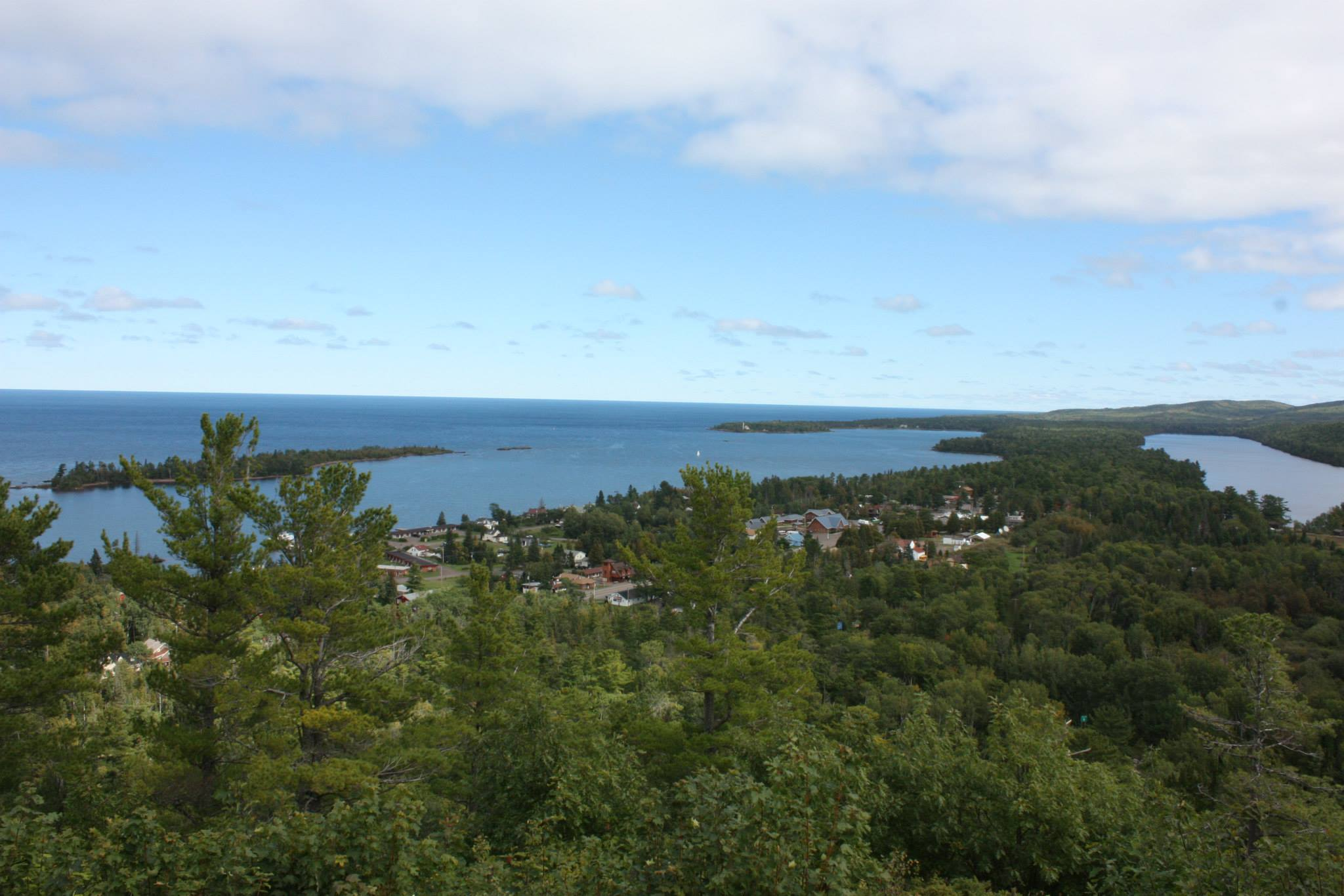
Copper Harbor and Lake Fanny Hooe

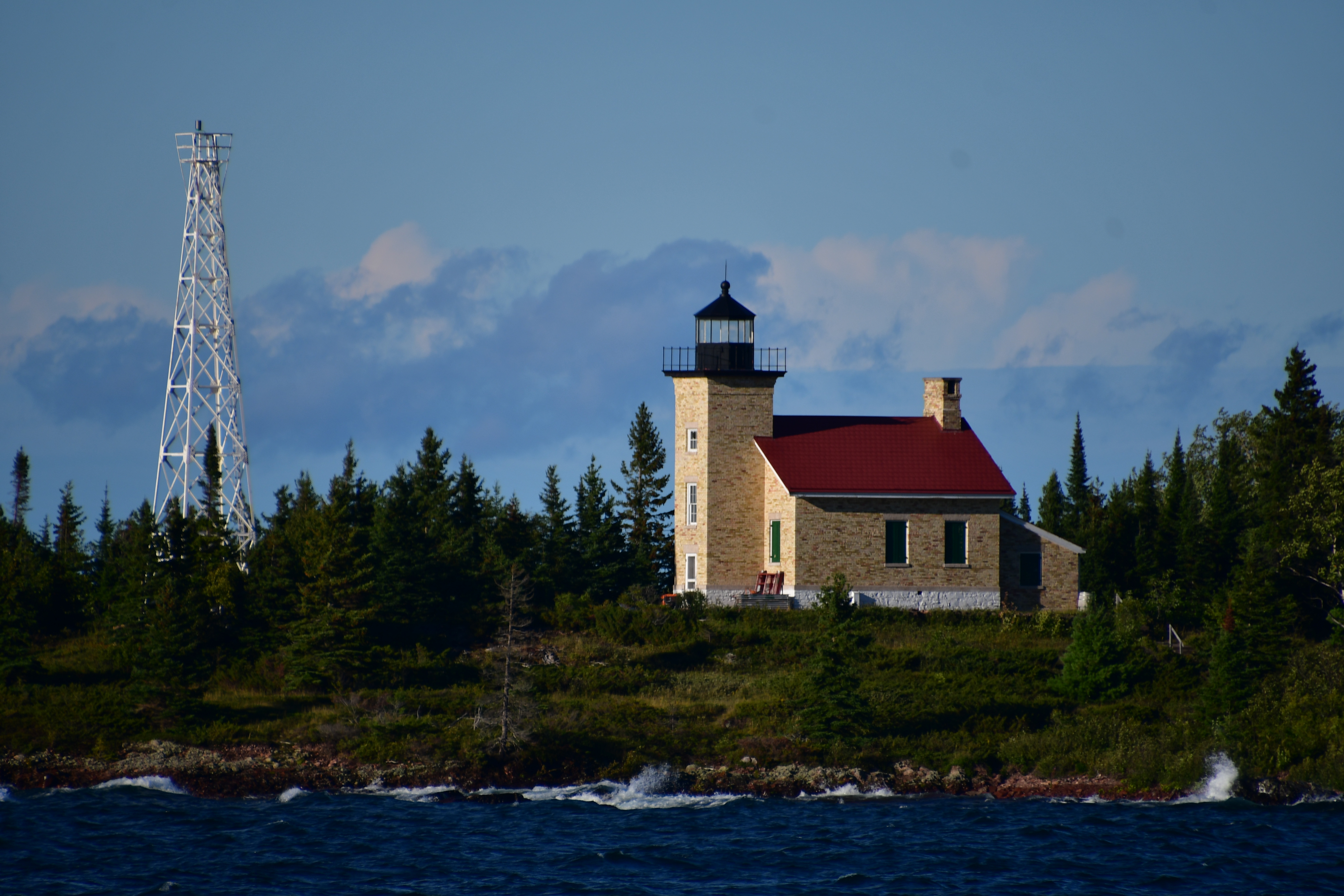
Copper Harbor Light

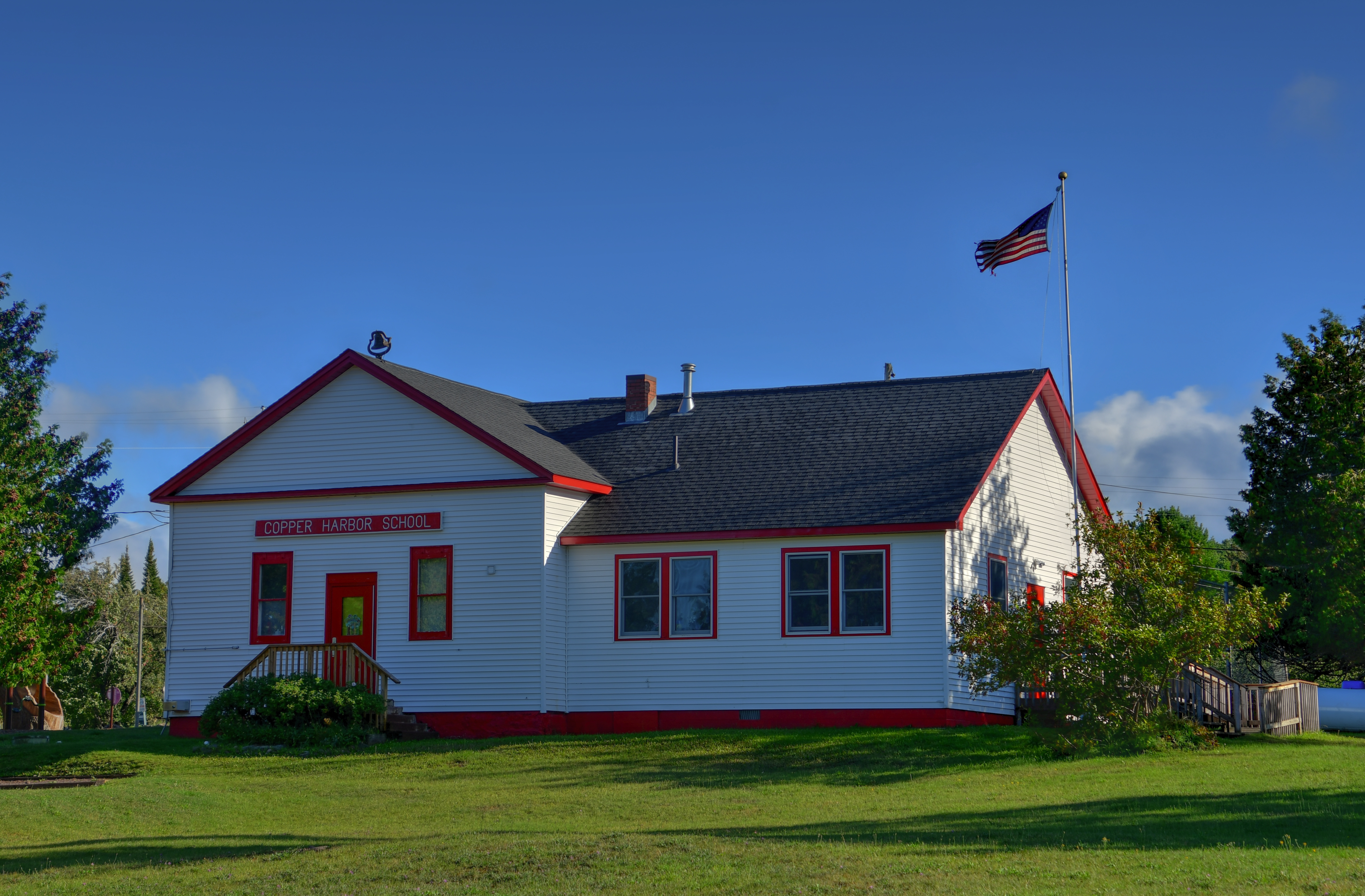
Copper Harbor School

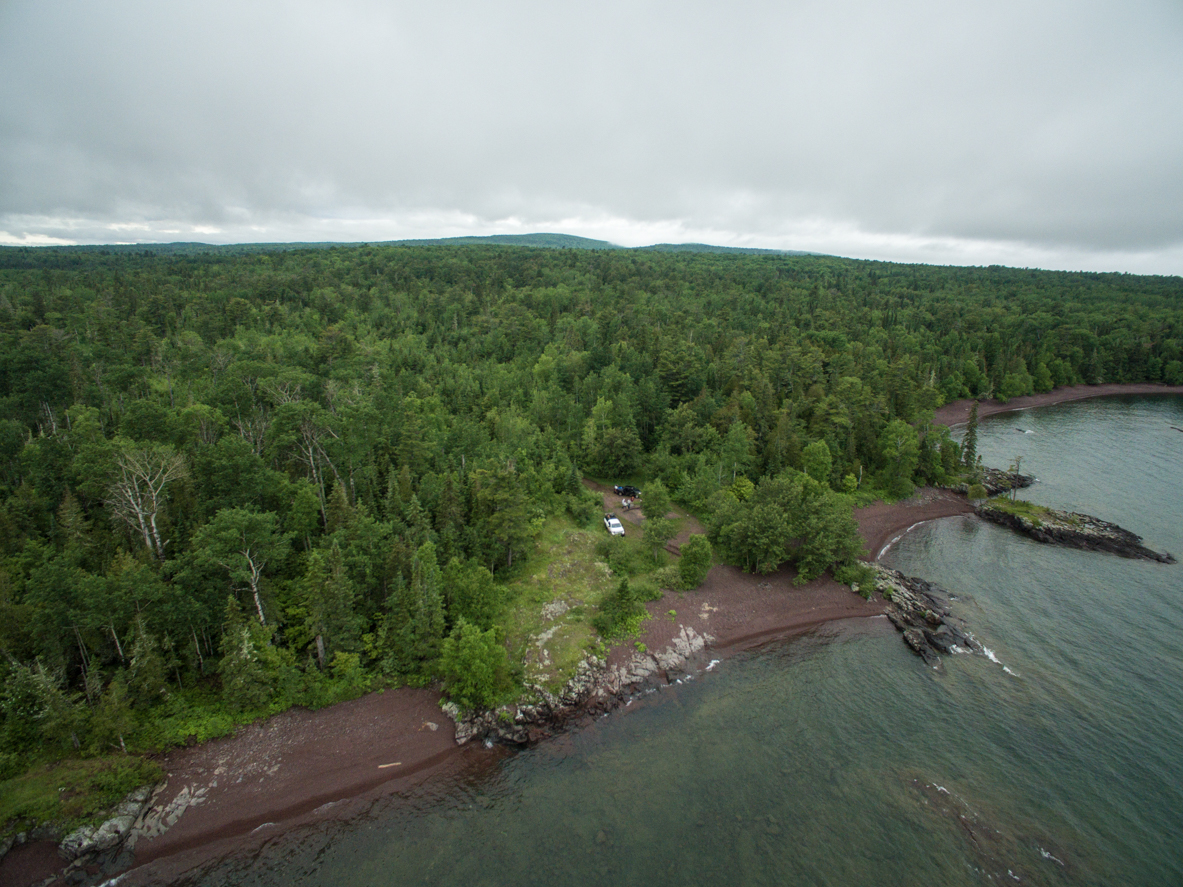
The former Keweenaw Rocket Range
