= Mandan, Michigan =

- Unincorporated community
- Location within the state of Michigan
- Coordinates: 47°25′30″N 88°00′56″W
- Country: United States
- State: Michigan
- County: Keweenaw
- Township: Grant
- Elevation: 1,079 ft (329 m)
- Time zone: UTC-5 (Eastern (EST))
  - Summer (DST): UTC-4 (EDT)
- ZIP code(s): 49918 (Copper Harbor)
- Area code: 906
- GNIS feature ID: 631377

Mandan is a ghost town in Grant Township, Keweenaw County, Michigan, on U.S. Route 41, about twelve miles south of Copper Harbor. It was the site of the Mandan Mine and the Medora Mine, two copper mines which were organized in 1864 and worked intermittently until their abandonment in 1909. The town was served by the Keweenaw Central Railroad.
