= Manitou Island (Michigan) =

Island on Lake Superior in Michigan, United States

Coordinates: 47°25′00″N 87°37′00″W

- Location within Michigan

Geography
- Location: Lake Superior, Grant Township, Keweenaw County, Michigan, United States

Administration
- United States
- State: Michigan
- County: Keweenaw County
- Township: Grant Township

Manitou Island is a small island in Lake Superior off the northeastern tip of the Keweenaw Peninsula in the U.S. state of Michigan. It is part of Grant Township in Keweenaw County. Located approximately three miles (4.8 km) from the mainland, it encompasses around 1,000 acres (400 ha). Manitou has seen limited impact from human activity because of its remote location and the often-treacherous waters caused by a strong current at the peninsula's tip. It is mostly forested, with scattered bogs and an inland lake known as "Perch Lake". Dense underbrush can make travel around the island rather difficult, though a few unimproved trails do exist. The Keweenaw Land Trust protects 93 acres (38 ha) of the island as the Manitou Island Light Station Preserve.

== History ==
Test pits have been found on the island, hinting at a short-lived past as a possible mining site. Though trees abound, Manitou's remoteness and its lack of quality timber make logging economically unfeasible. Commercial fishermen have used the island as a camp site in the past, staying overnight on the south beaches while setting their nets in the area. Today public access is facilitated by a timber and rock crib dock near the old lighthouse.

Beginning in 2002, Manitou Island became the focus of an effort by local birdwatchers to explore and document the various avian species there. Approximately 203 species have been recorded, including large numbers of migratory raptors and waterbirds. Observers have also compiled a "list of over 80 species as at least possible breeders". Organized observations are conducted by the Keweenaw Audubon Society. Efforts to investigate this unique habitat and its birds are ongoing, in conjunction with the conservation activities of a land trust. The large number of birds should be understood in the larger context of other sites around Michigan and the Great Lakes. This would include Peninsula Point Light, Tawas Point State Park and Whitefish Point Bird Observatory. Important Bird Areas are found in many parts of Michigan.

== Lighthouses ==
=== Manitou Island Light Station ===
Manitou Island's most important use to date has been the Manitou Island Light Station on its eastern tip. First built in 1849, the lighthouse is still in use, although it is unmanned and solar powered. The island is presently in the custody of the Keweenaw Land Trust, which acquired the light station and surrounding land in 2004. The owners have announced plans to encourage public use of Manitou through camping, rock collecting, hiking, boating, kayaking, fishing, and sightseeing at the old light station, while preserving the island's unspoiled scenery and natural habitats.

=== Gull Rock ===
Gull Rock, an islet about one-half mile (0.80 km) off Manitou's western tip, contains a historic lighthouse built in 1867 which still functions (like the Manitou light) as an unattended navigational aid. Recently a local preservation society acquired the islet and its dilapidated light station, with a view to its ultimate restoration.
