= Lighthouse Digest =

US maritime-history magazine

- Editor: Tim Harrison
- Frequency: Six issues per year
- First issue: May, 1992
- Final issue: March 2025
- Company: Foghorn Publishing
- Country: United States
- Based in: East Machias, Maine
- Language: English
- Website: http://www.lighthousedigest.com/
- ISSN: 1066-0038

Lighthouse Digest, a specialty magazine from FogHorn Publishing in East Machias, Maine, is about maritime history with particular attention to the preservation of lighthouses and their past. Though it is geared toward enthusiasts and antiquarians in the United States, it is also quoted commonly in more academic publications, and its editors have become a staple presence in scholarly circles. Editor Tim Harrison issued the first number in May, 1992.

== Scope ==
Coverage includes historic and current lighthouse events and an events calendar for lighthouse activities around the United States and elsewhere. They publish a "Doomsday List" (see below) of endangered lighthouses, and have helped save a number of at-risk lighthouses.

They have been credited with uncovering many parts of lighthouse history that had been unknown, or which were thought to have been lost.

Each issue carries articles and unusual lighthouse-related stories that, for the most part, cannot be found elsewhere, and many photos, historic and contemporary.

Tim Harrison died on August 19, 2023, at the age of 75.

== Audience ==
Lighthouse Digest had subscribers in all 50 United States and 17 other nations. The founding editor was Tim Harrison; the managing editor was Kathleen Finnegan-Harrison.

== Doomsday List ==
The Lighthouse Digest Doomsday List is a list of endangered lighthouses. The list usually consists of lighthouses in the United States and Canada, but occasionally includes sites from other countries as well. Inclusion on the list raises awareness that a lighthouse is in trouble. Russ Rowlett keeps an annotated version of the Lighthouse Digest Doomsday List on the Lighthouse Directory. He has also compiled a Watch List of other lighthouses he feels should be on the Doomsday List.

The Nova Scotia Lighthouse Preservation Society also holds a Doomsday List of Canadian endangered lighthouses, though according to Russ Rowlett it is not truly national in scope as most of the lighthouses listed are in Nova Scotia. Russ Rowlett keeps a more complete list with no official standing.

A similar list for lighthouses in Puerto Rico was constructed by Sandra Shanklin for the Lighthouse Digest in 2002.
