= Lake Fanny Hooe =

Lake in Keweenaw County, Michigan, United States

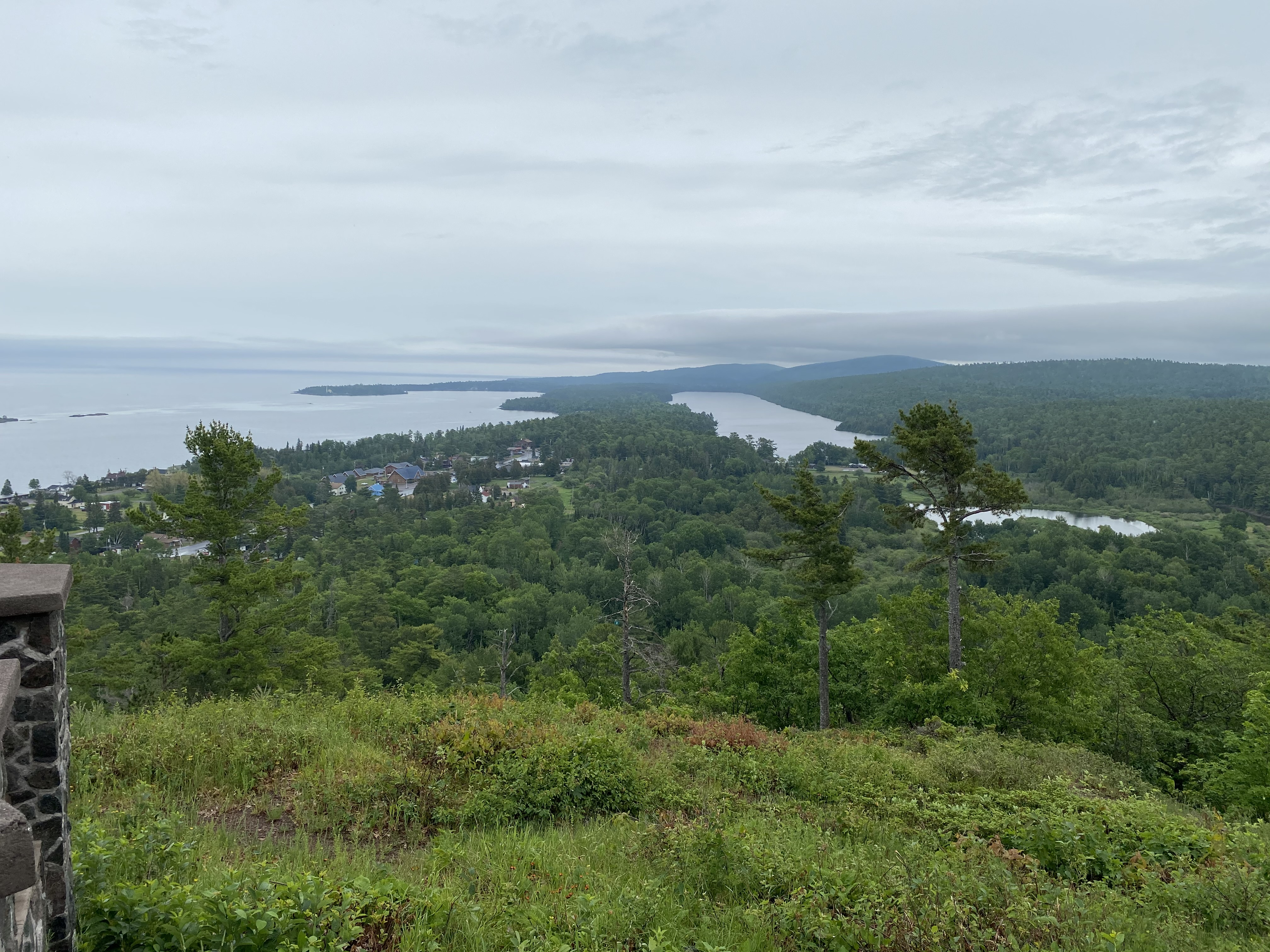
- Lake Fanny Hooe in the middle right of the image

- Location within Michigan Location within the United States
- Location: Grant Township, Keweenaw County, Michigan
- Coordinates: 47°27′51″N 87°51′47″W
- Type: Lake
- Basin countries: United States
- Surface area: 227 acres (92 ha)
- Max. depth: 40 ft (12 m)
- Surface elevation: 620 ft (190 m)
- Settlements: Copper Harbor

Lake Fanny Hooe is a 227-acre (92 ha) lake in Keweenaw County, Michigan. The Garden Brook connects Lake Fanny Hooe to Lake Superior, 800 feet (240 m) to the north. The community of Copper Harbor lies to the north west side of the lake. Home to a U.S. Army fort built in 1844, Fort Wilkins Historic State Park is also situated between Lake Fanny Hooe and Lake Superior.

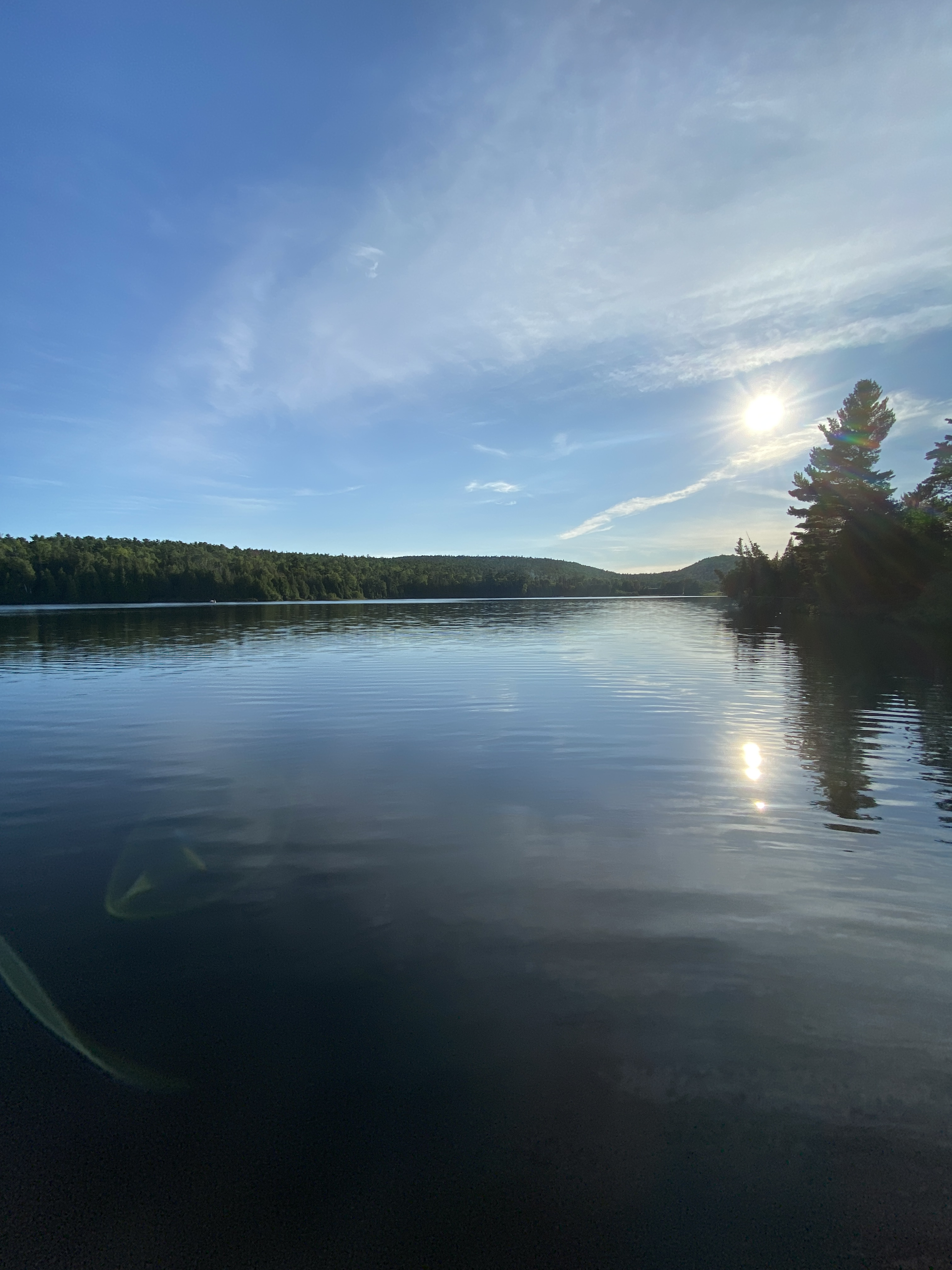
Lake Fanny Hooe in the evening

== See also ==
- List of lakes in Michigan
