= Manitou Island Light Station =

Lighthouse in Michigan, United States

Manitou Island Light
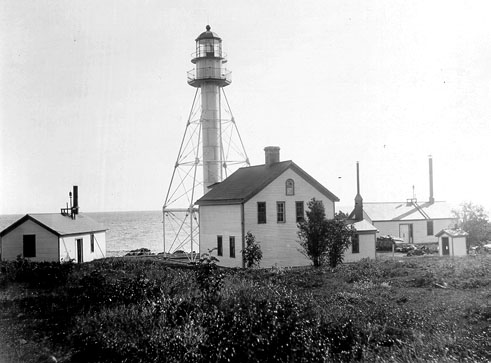
- Undated USCG photo of the station
- Location: Manitou Island, Michigan
- Coordinates: 47°25′11″N 87°35′14″W

Tower
- Constructed: 1850
- Construction: Iron
- Automated: 1978
- Height: 42.5 feet (13.0 m)
- Shape: Skeletal with central column
- Markings: White
- Heritage: National Register of Historic Places listed place

Light
- First lit: 1862
- Focal height: 25 m (82 ft)
- Lens: Third order Fresnel lens (original), 12-volt solar powered 7.5-inch (190 mm) acrylic optic (current)
- Characteristic: Fl W 10s
- Manitou Island Light Station
- U.S. National Register of Historic Places
- Nearest city: Copper Harbor, Michigan
- Built: 1861
- MPS: U.S. Coast Guard Lighthouses and Light Stations on the Great Lakes TR
- NRHP reference No.: 84001773
- Added to NRHP: July 19, 1984

The Manitou Island Light Station is a lighthouse located on Manitou Island, off the tip of Michigan's Keweenaw Peninsula in Lake Superior. It was listed on the National Register of Historic Places in 1984.

== Description ==
The Manitou Island Light Station consists of a skeletal steel light tower with associated keeper's house, outbuildings, and various walkways and foundations. The tower base measures 26 feet (7.9 m) square at the base and is 17.5 feet (5.3 m) high. The base supports a 42.5 feet (13.0 m) high skeletal tower, atop which is a cast iron ten-sided watch room and ten-sided lantern. A circular staircase covered with iron and lined with wood provides access to the watchtower. The original lens was a Third Order Fresnel Made by Le Paute of Paris and had six separate panels, each with a bull's eye prism. The current lens is also a Third Order Fresnel, with four panels inscribed P. Barbier and Co., Paris.

The keeper's house is a ten-room, two-story frame structure on a stone foundation. It is sided with asbestos shingles (likely from the 1930s) and shingled with asphalt. The interior still has some original doors and woodwork, but much of the wall material and flooring are modern additions.

== History ==
The first lighthouse on Manitou Island was a rubble-stone tower built in 1850. In 1861, the current light replaced it (one of three built that year with iron structure by the West Point Foundry in New York; the other two were De Tour Reef and Whitefish Point lights, the latter of which still stands and it and Manitou are the oldest iron skeletal light towers on the Great Lakes); the keeper's house was built the same year. A fog signal was added in 1871, and buildings to house it in 1875. These signals were refurbished in 1899. In 1895, an oil house was added, in 1901 a boathouse, and in 1930 a concrete fog signal building was constructed, replacing the earlier one. It is the oldest iron skeletal light tower on the Great Lakes.

The light was automated in 1978, and is still in use as a navigational aid. In 2004, the Keweenaw Land Trust acquired the light from the United States Government, along with surrounding land, under the auspices of the National Historic Lighthouse Preservation Act. The area is open to the public, and is available for camping, rock collecting, hiking, boating, sea kayaking, fishing, and sightseeing.
