= Keweenaw County, Michigan =

County in Michigan, United States

- County
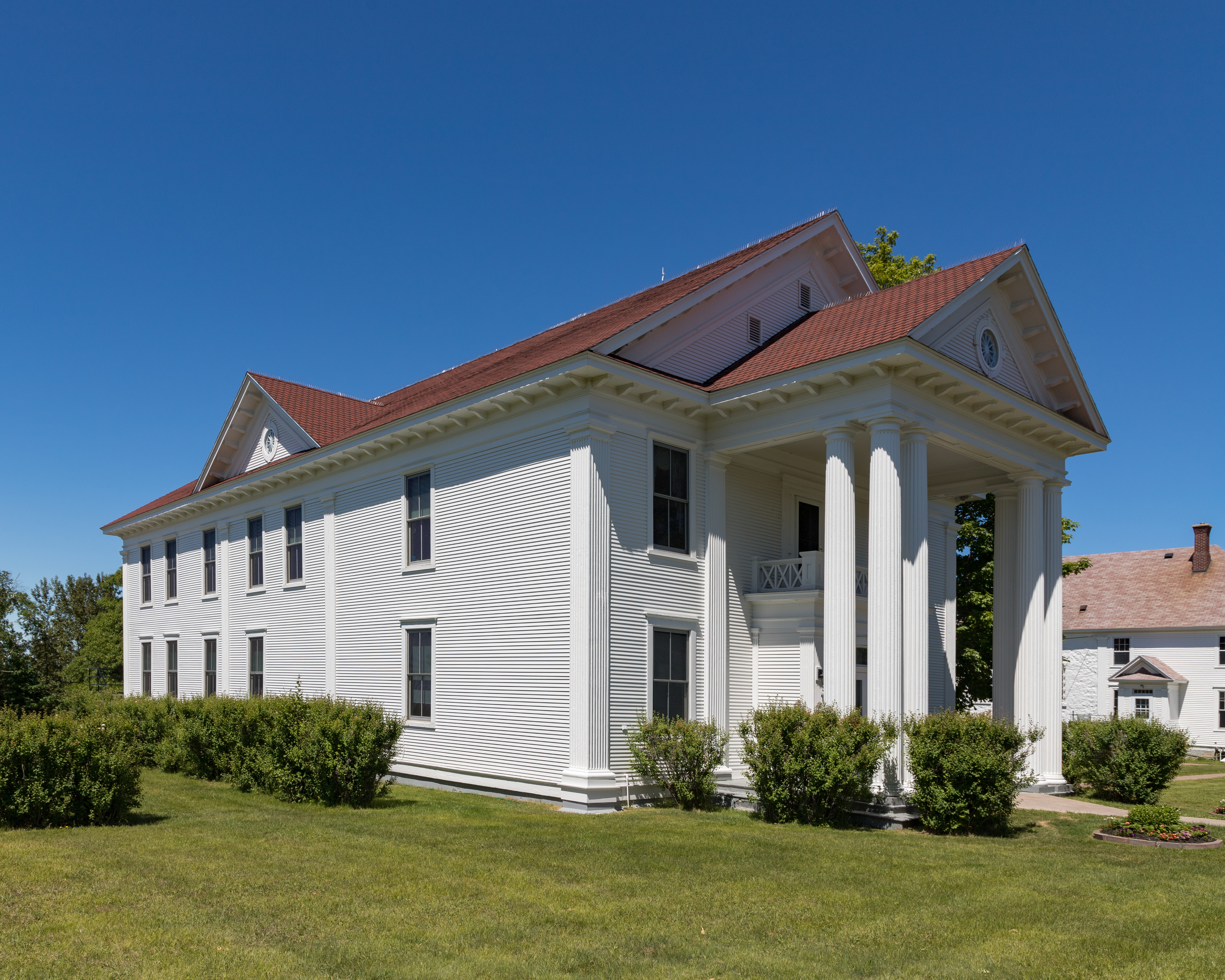
- Keweenaw County Courthouse (built 1866) in Eagle River

- Location within the U.S. state of Michigan
- Coordinates: 47°29′N 88°10′W
- Country: United States
- State: Michigan
- Founded: March 11, 1861
- Named for: Keweenaw Bay
- Seat: Eagle River
- Largest settlement: Mohawk (CDP); Ahmeek (village)

Area
  - Total: 5,966 sq mi (15,450 km^{2})
  - Land: 540 sq mi (1,400 km^{2})
  - Water: 5,426 sq mi (14,050 km^{2}) 91%

Population (2020)
  - Total: 2,046
  - Estimate (2025): 2,186 ▲
  - Density: 4/sq mi (1.5/km^{2})
- Time zone: UTC−5 (Eastern)
  - Summer (DST): UTC−4 (EDT)
- Congressional district: 1st
- Website: www.keweenawcountyonline.org

Keweenaw County (/ˈkiːwənɔː/, KEE-wə-naw) is a county in the western Upper Peninsula of the U.S. state of Michigan. As of the 2020 census, the county's population was 2,046, making it Michigan's least populous county. It is also the state's largest county by total area, the state's northernmost county, and includes the waters of Lake Superior. The county seat is Eagle River.

Located at the northeastern end of the Keweenaw Peninsula, Keweenaw County is part of the Houghton, Michigan micropolitan area. Keweenaw County contains two National Park Service units: Isle Royale National Park and Keweenaw National Historical Park. The county is part of Michigan's Copper Country region, an area where copper mining was prevalent from the 1840s to the 1960s.

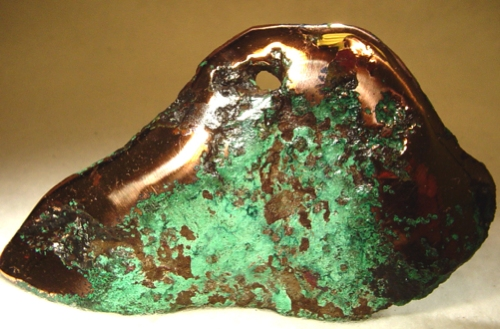
Polished native copper nugget from Keweenaw County. Keweenaw County copper mines were important producers in the late 19th and early 20th centuries.

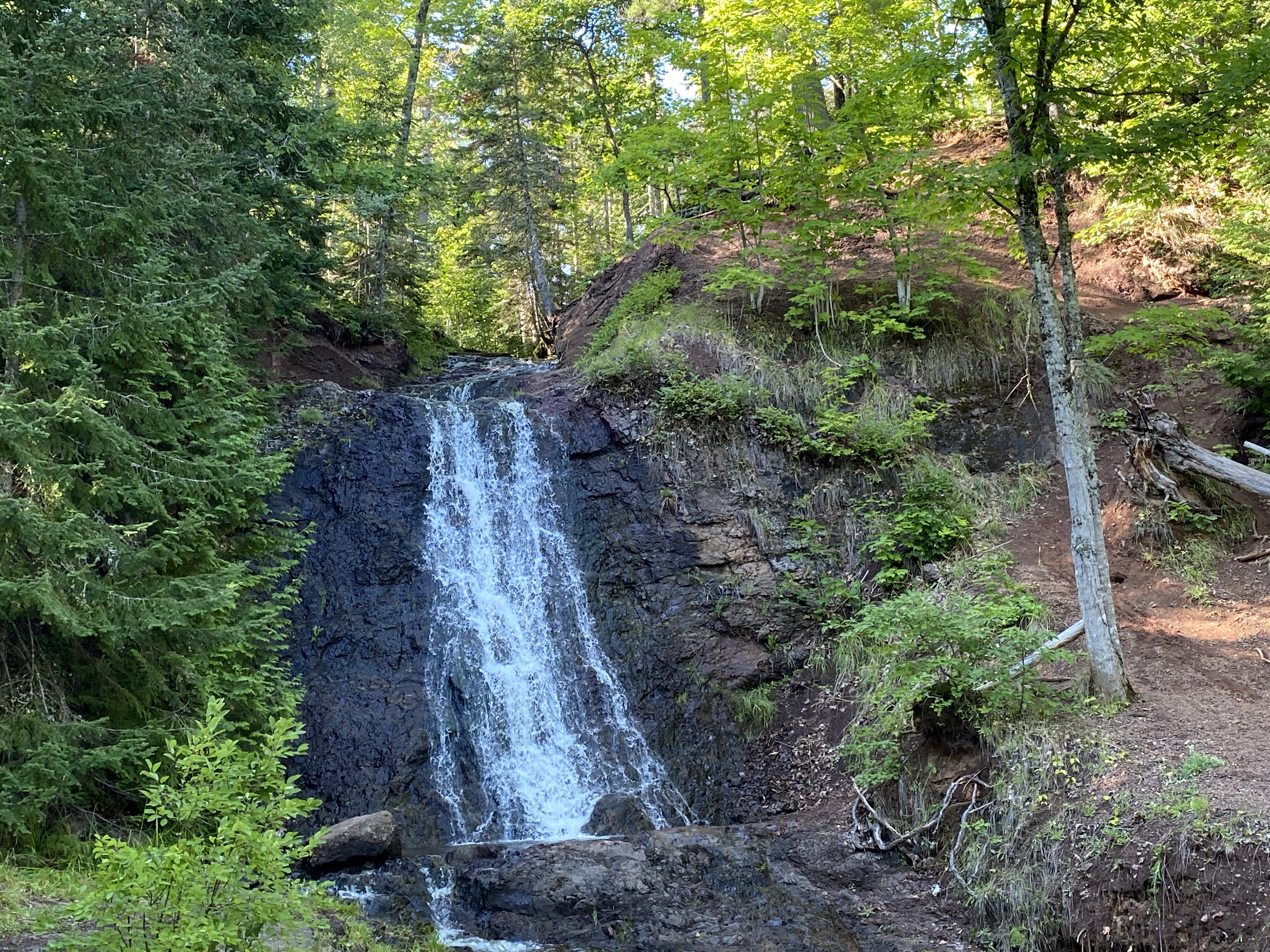
Haven Falls, on Haven Creek near Lac La Belle

== History ==
The county was set off and organized in 1861. It is believed "Keweenaw" is a corruption of an Ojibwe word that means "portage" or "place where portage is made"; compare the names of the nearby Portage Lake and Portage River which together make up the Keweenaw Waterway.

== Geography ==
Two land masses comprise most of the land portion of the county: Isle Royale and the northeastern half of the Keweenaw Peninsula. The county also includes the waters of Lake Superior between the two, extending to the state's water borders with Ontario and Minnesota. It is thus the largest county in Michigan by total area, at 5,966 square miles (15,450 km^{2}), of which just 540 square miles (1,400 km^{2}) is land and 5,426 square miles (14,050 km^{2}) (91%) is water. Of all counties (or equivalents) in the United States, Keweenaw County has the highest proportion of water area to total area.

The largest lake entirely within the county is Gratiot Lake at 1,438 acres (5.82 km^{2}), located at the base of the county's two highest peaks: Mt. Horace Greeley at 1,550 feet (470 m) and Mt. Gratiot at 1,490 feet (450 m). Other lakes include Lac La Belle near Bete Grise Bay, Lake Medora, Lake Fanny Hooe near Copper Harbor, Lake Bailey at the base of Mt. Baldy, and Schlatter Lake at the tip of the peninsula.

By land, one can only access mainland Keweenaw County via Houghton County.

=== National protected area ===
- Isle Royale National Park
- Keweenaw National Historical Park (part)

=== Major highways ===
- US 41 runs northeast–southwest through the upper center part of the mainland portion of the county. It enters the southern area of the county at Bumbletown passes Phoenix, Delaware, Mandan, Copper Harbor and terminates north of Lake Fanny Hooe.
- M-26 loops from Phoenix to the shoreline of Lake Superior, then runs northeasterly along the shoreline to the intersection with US 41 at Copper Harbor.

=== Adjacent counties and district ===
Keweenaw County is the only county in Michigan to connect to the U.S. state of Minnesota via ferry service from Grand Portage to Windigo and Rock Harbor on Isle Royale.

By land

- Houghton County, south

By water

- Thunder Bay District, Ontario, Canada, north
- Alger County, east
- Marquette County, southeast
- Ontonagon County, southwest
- Cook County, Minnesota, northwest

== Communities ==
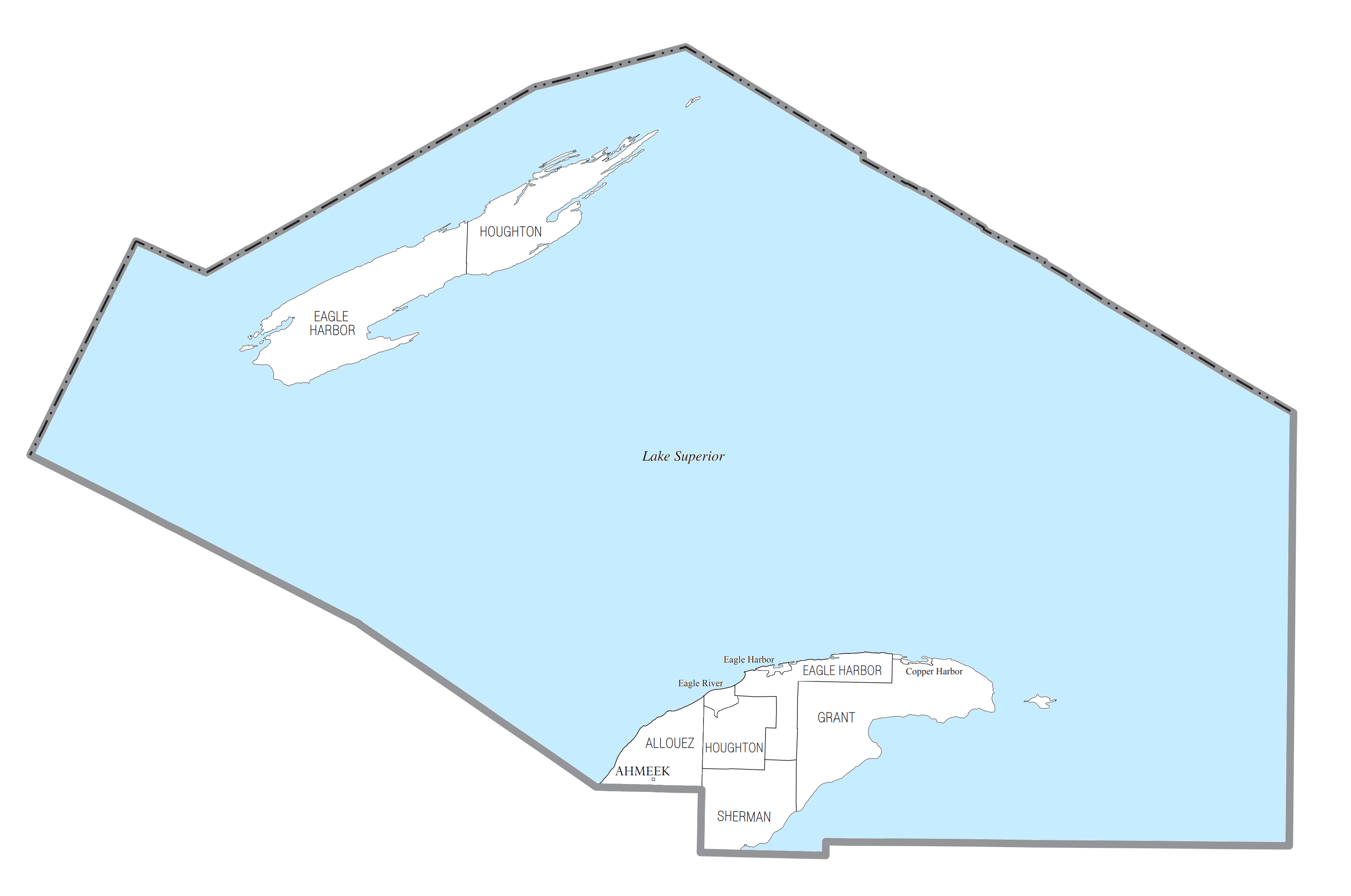
U.S. Census data map showing local municipal boundaries within Keweenaw County, as well as CDP boundaries

=== Village ===
- Ahmeek

=== Census-designated places ===
- Copper Harbor
- Fulton
- Eagle Harbor
- Eagle River (county seat)
- Mohawk

=== Civil townships ===
- Allouez Township
- Eagle Harbor Township
- Grant Township
- Houghton Township
- Sherman Township

==== Defunct townships ====
- Copper Harbor Township
- Sibley Township

=== Other unincorporated communities ===
- Allouez
- Bete Grise
- Betsy
- Bumbletown
- Central
- Copper Falls
- Delaware
- Eagle Nest
- Gay
- Hebards
- Lac La Belle
- Mandan
- Nepco Camp Number 7
- Ojibway
- Phoenix
- Rock Harbor Lodge
- Seneca
- Snowshoe
- Traverse
- Vaughnsville
- Windigo
- Wyoming

=== Ghost towns ===
- Clifton

== Demographics ==
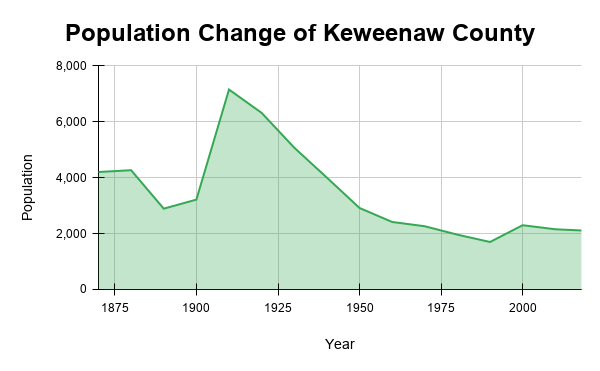
The graph depicts the change in population of the county over its history. The record starts at 1870, and goes until 2018.

Historical population
Census	Pop.	Note	%±
1870	4,205		—
1880	4,270		1.5%
1890	2,894		−32.2%
1900	3,217		11.2%
1910	7,156		122.4%
1920	6,322		−11.7%
1930	5,076		−19.7%
1940	4,004		−21.1%
1950	2,918		−27.1%
1960	2,417		−17.2%
1970	2,264		−6.3%
1980	1,963		−13.3%
1990	1,701		−13.3%
2000	2,301		35.3%
2010	2,156		−6.3%
2020	2,046		−5.1%
2025 (est.)	2,186	▲	6.8%
US Decennial Census; 1790-1960 1900-1990; 1990-2000 2010-2018

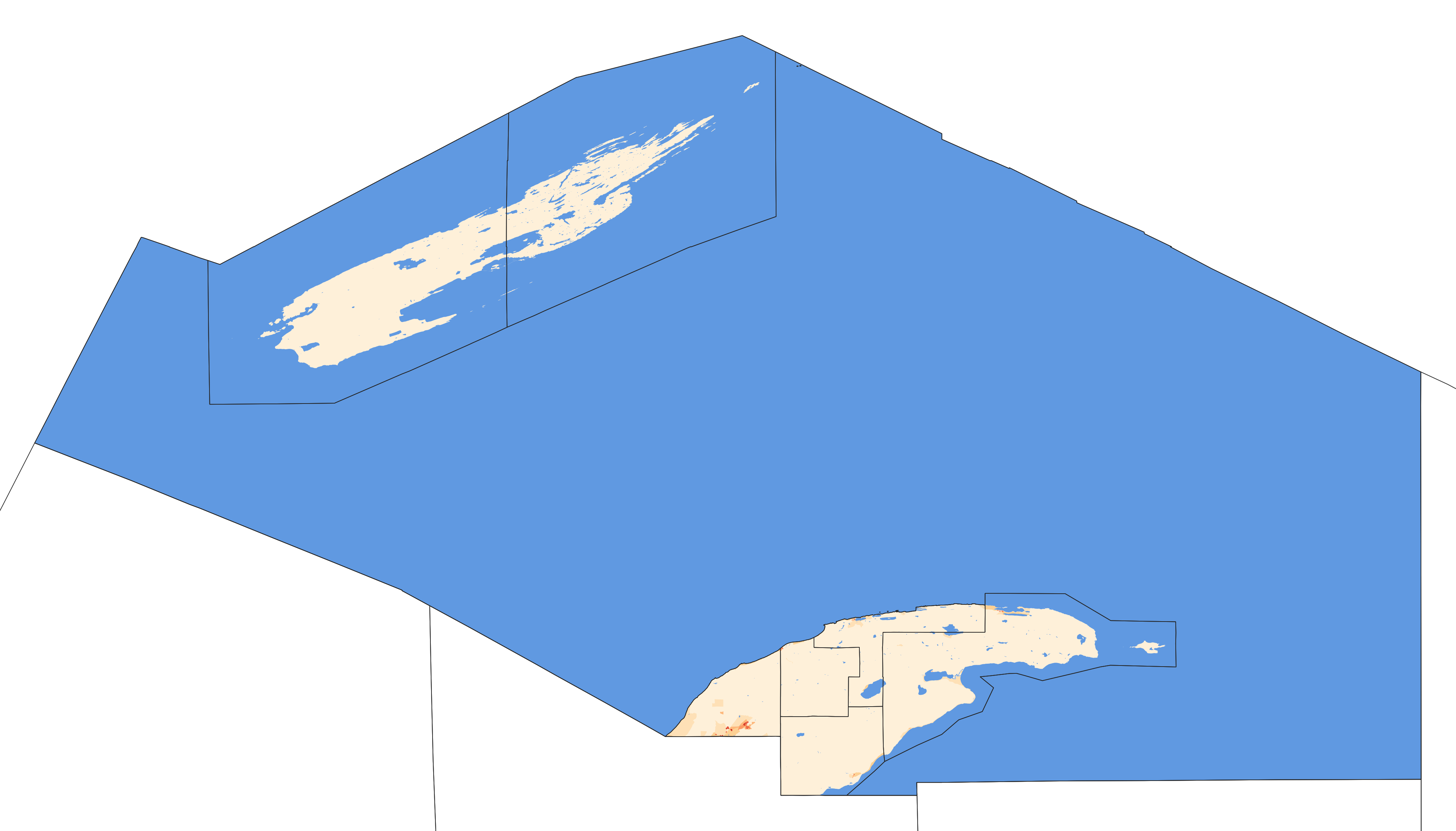
2020 population density of Keweenaw County MI by census block

=== Racial and ethnic composition ===
Keweenaw County, Michigan – Racial and ethnic composition Note: the US Census treats Hispanic/Latino as an ethnic category. This table excludes Latinos from the racial categories and assigns them to a separate category. Hispanics/Latinos may be of any race.
Race / Ethnicity (NH = Non-Hispanic)	Pop 1980	Pop 1990	Pop 2000	Pop 2010	Pop 2020	% 1980	% 1990	% 2000	% 2010	% 2020
White alone (NH)	1,936	1,683	2,177	2,117	1,948	98.62%	98.94%	94.61%	98.19%	95.21%
Black or African American alone (NH)	9	1	79	3	4	0.46%	0.06%	3.43%	0.14%	0.20%
Native American or Alaska Native alone (NH)	1	4	2	3	1	0.05%	0.24%	0.09%	0.14%	0.05%
Asian alone (NH)	2	6	2	1	0	0.10%	0.35%	0.09%	0.05%	0.00%
Native Hawaiian or Pacific Islander alone (NH)	x	x	0	0	0	x	x	0.00%	0.00%	0.00%
Other race alone (NH)	9	1	0	0	5	0.46%	0.06%	0.00%	0.00%	0.24%
Mixed race or Multiracial (NH)	x	x	23	17	61	x	x	1.00%	0.79%	2.98%
Hispanic or Latino (any race)	6	6	18	15	27	0.31%	0.35%	0.78%	0.70%	1.32%
Total	1,963	1,701	2,301	2,156	2,046	100.00%	100.00%	100.00%	100.00%	100.00%

=== 2020 census ===
As of the 2020 census, the county had a population of 2,046. The median age was 56.6 years, with 15.5% of residents under the age of 18 and 35.4% of residents 65 years of age or older; for every 100 females there were 107.9 males, and for every 100 females age 18 and over there were 106.5 males age 18 and over.

The racial makeup of the county was 95.5% White, 0.2% Black or African American, <0.1% American Indian and Alaska Native, <0.1% Asian, <0.1% Native Hawaiian and Pacific Islander, 0.7% from some other race, and 3.5% from two or more races. Hispanic or Latino residents of any race comprised 1.3% of the population.

<0.1% of residents lived in urban areas, while 100.0% lived in rural areas.

There were 1,000 households in the county, of which 19.1% had children under the age of 18 living in them. Of all households, 50.8% were married-couple households, 22.5% were households with a male householder and no spouse or partner present, and 20.4% were households with a female householder and no spouse or partner present. About 32.6% of all households were made up of individuals and 18.1% had someone living alone who was 65 years of age or older.

There were 2,270 housing units, of which 55.9% were vacant. Among occupied housing units, 90.1% were owner-occupied and 9.9% were renter-occupied. The homeowner vacancy rate was 2.0% and the rental vacancy rate was 18.5%.

=== 2010 census ===
The 2010 United States census indicated Keweenaw County had a population of 2,156. This decrease of 145 people from the 2000 United States census represents a -6.3% change in population. In 2010 there were 1,013 households and 614 families in the county. The population density was 4 people per square mile (1.5 people/km^{2}). There were 2,467 housing units at an average density of 4 per square mile (1.5/km^{2}).

At the 2010 census, 98.5% of the population were White, 0.1% Black or African American, 0.1% Native American and 1.2% of two or more races; a total of 0.7% were Hispanic or Latino (of any race); of them, 28.8% were of Finnish, 14.0% German, 9.0% English, 6.6% French, French Canadian or Cajun and 5.7% Irish ancestry.

=== Religion ===
Through a 2020 survey by the Association of Religion Data Archives, Keweenaw County's religious population was predominantly Christian with the Evangelical Lutheran Church in America as the largest Christian group for the area. Following, the Roman Catholic Church was the second-largest Christian group in the county.

== Politics ==
Keweenaw County was solidly Republican after the American Civil War, and until the Franklin Delano Roosevelt era. In 1900, 1904 and 1908 it stood as the nation's most Republican county. In his last election of 1944, Roosevelt became the first Democrat to win the county since Horatio Seymour in 1868. However, from 1964 to 1996 Keweenaw voted Democratic in every election except 1972 and 1980, thus standing as one of only six counties nationwide (Note: The other five are the Massachusetts counties of Middlesex and Dukes, college town Tompkins County, New York, historically heavily unionized coal mining Magoffin County, Kentucky, and Ringgold County, Iowa.) to support both Alf Landon and Walter Mondale, who suffered the two worst electoral vote losses since 1824. Since 2000, the county has become solidly Republican again.

United States presidential election results for Keweenaw County, Michigan
Year	Republican		Democratic		Third party(ies)	
Year	No.	%	No.	%	No.	%
1884	620	74.43%	201	24.13%	12	1.44%
1888	411	68.50%	185	30.83%	4	0.67%
1892	400	65.36%	202	33.01%	10	1.63%
1896	411	88.96%	45	9.74%	6	1.30%
1900	452	92.24%	31	6.33%	7	1.43%
1904	659	94.55%	29	4.16%	9	1.29%
1908	1,026	90.56%	63	5.56%	44	3.88%
1912	495	44.80%	59	5.34%	551	49.86%
1916	860	77.97%	194	17.59%	49	4.44%
1920	1,272	90.15%	89	6.31%	50	3.54%
1924	1,421	91.15%	50	3.21%	88	5.64%
1928	1,305	76.58%	360	21.13%	39	2.29%
1932	1,454	72.45%	527	26.26%	26	1.30%
1936	1,070	49.68%	1,060	49.21%	24	1.11%
1940	1,080	52.43%	967	46.94%	13	0.63%
1944	866	47.14%	965	52.53%	6	0.33%
1948	814	50.09%	647	39.82%	164	10.09%
1952	801	51.38%	747	47.92%	11	0.71%
1956	834	54.76%	689	45.24%	0	0.00%
1960	684	50.93%	655	48.77%	4	0.30%
1964	374	30.28%	860	69.64%	1	0.08%
1968	525	43.97%	602	50.42%	67	5.61%
1972	715	60.49%	456	38.58%	11	0.93%
1976	606	47.68%	658	51.77%	7	0.55%
1980	583	46.27%	570	45.24%	107	8.49%
1984	599	48.82%	628	51.18%	0	0.00%
1988	536	45.81%	631	53.93%	3	0.26%
1992	378	32.23%	582	49.62%	213	18.16%
1996	491	39.53%	572	46.05%	179	14.41%
2000	740	55.10%	540	40.21%	63	4.69%
2004	781	54.27%	630	43.78%	28	1.95%
2008	756	53.62%	610	43.26%	44	3.12%
2012	774	55.60%	582	41.81%	36	2.59%
2016	814	56.76%	527	36.75%	93	6.49%
2020	862	55.36%	672	43.16%	23	1.48%
2024	896	55.62%	690	42.83%	25	1.55%

United States Senate election results for Keweenaw County, Michigan1
Year	Republican		Democratic		Third party(ies)	
Year	No.	%	No.	%	No.	%
2024	882	55.65%	665	41.96%	38	2.40%

Michigan Gubernatorial election results for Keweenaw County
Year	Republican		Democratic		Third party(ies)	
Year	No.	%	No.	%	No.	%
2022	701	50.43%	666	47.91%	23	1.65%

== Government ==
The county government operates the jail, maintains rural roads, operates the major local courts, records deeds, mortgages, and vital records, administers public health regulations, and participates with the state in the provision of social services. The county board of commissioners controls the budget and has limited authority to make laws or ordinances. In Michigan, most local government functions—police and fire, building and zoning, tax assessment, street maintenance, etc.—are the responsibility of individual cities and townships. The Keweenaw County Courthouse and Sheriff's Residence and Jail in Eagle River faces Lake Superior. The courthouse was built in 1866, followed by the sheriff's residence and jail in 1886, and then remodeled in 1925. In her book Buildings of Michigan, Eckert writes:

"Like a meetinghouse on a New England public square, and enclosed by a 3-foot [0.91 m] high public wall on the east and south sides, ...transformed in 1925 into its present stark white classical appearance. The courthouse for this sparsely populated remote county is remarkable in its formality...These include the giant Doric columns with fillets and bases, a pediment forming a projecting portico, a modillioned cornice, and pedimented side dormers."

The courthouse still preserves its original appearance.

Sparsely populated Keweenaw County was a mining center in the latter 19th century but in the 20th century turned into a resort community. Because of this trend, Keweenaw County is also the only county in Michigan to have a lower population in the year 2000 than in 1900.

=== Elected officials ===
- Probate Judge: Keith DeForge
- Prosecuting Attorney: Charles (Chuck) Miller
- Sheriff: Curt Pennala
- County Clerk/Register of Deeds: Julie Carlson
- County Treasurer: Eric Hermanson
- Mine Inspector: John Cima

(information as of January 2021)

== See also ==
- List of Michigan State Historic Sites in Keweenaw County
- National Register of Historic Places listings in Keweenaw County, Michigan
- Copper Country
