= German smear =

German grouting technique

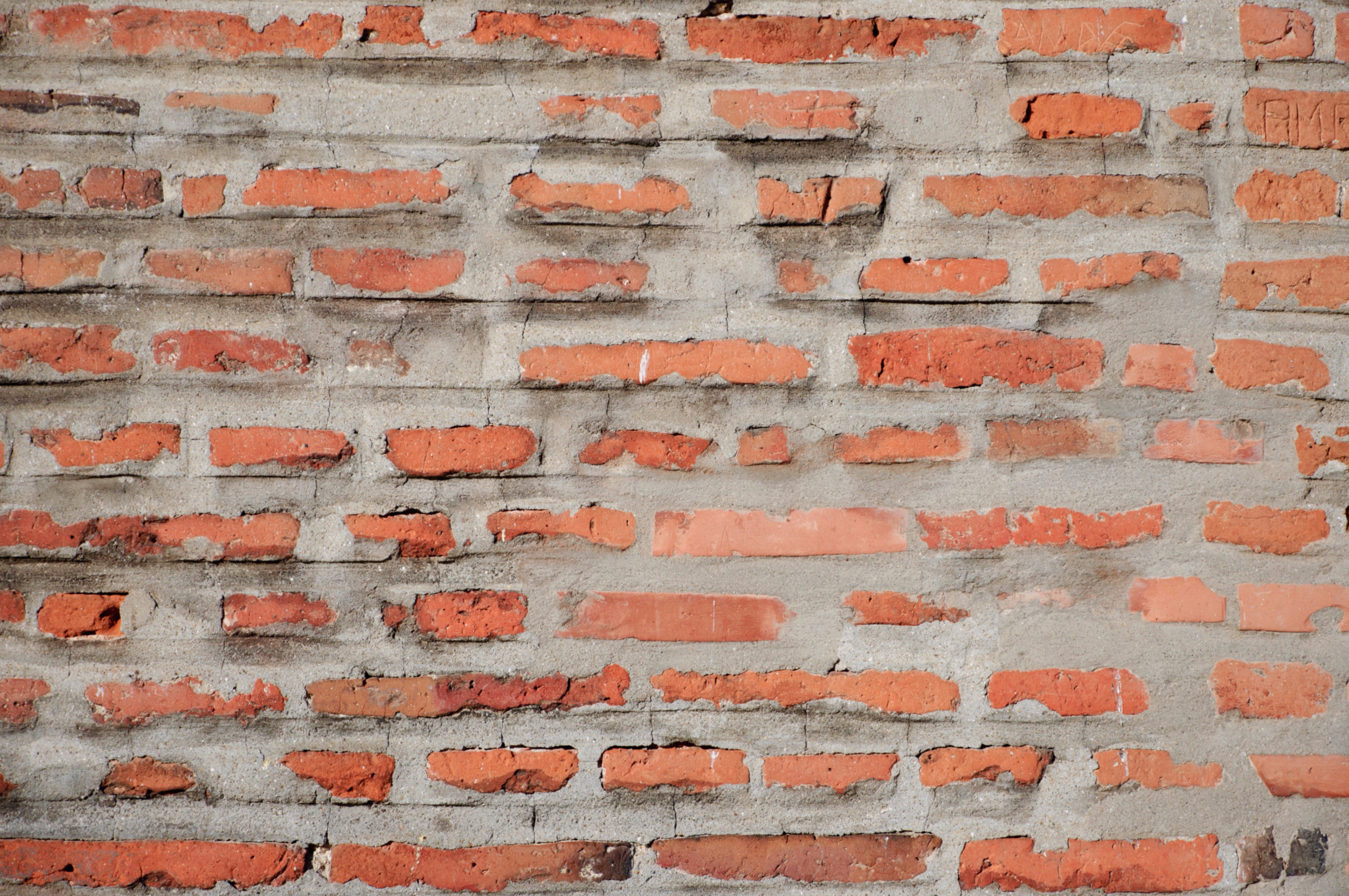
Brick wall with “German smear”

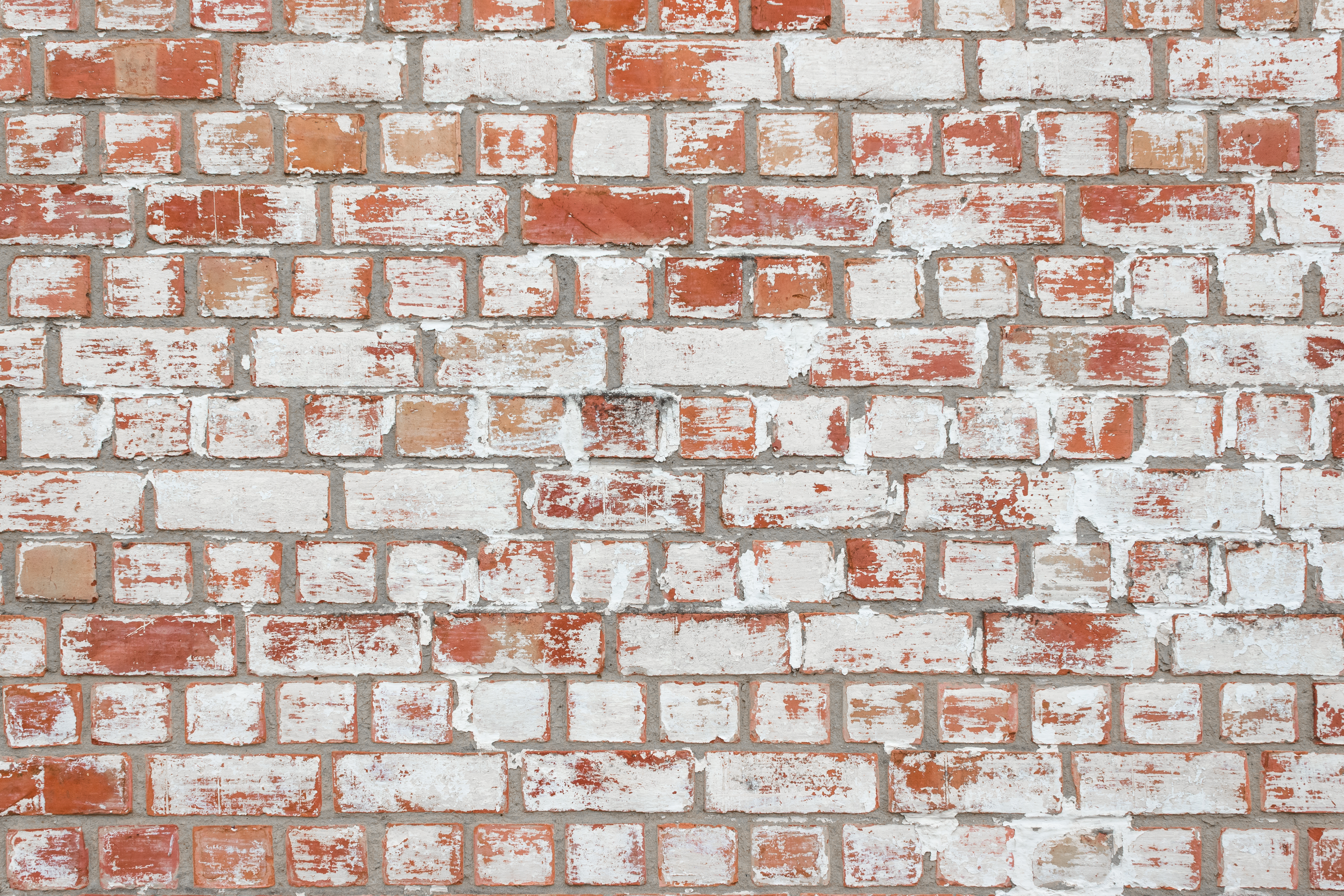
Brick wall that's painted like in case of lime and whitewash

German schmear, sometimes called “German smear”, is a term coined by decorator Joanna Gaines and first used publicly in a 2015 Season 3 episode of HGTV’s “Fixer Upper.” It refers to a grouting technique applying mortar between and over the faces of masonry. Urban legend has it that the idea of applying mortar onto masonry was first introduced in Germany in the 1500s as a way to finish walls made of brick and stone. Evidence suggests, however, that this use of mortar predates Germany by several centuries.

In contrast to limewash and whitewash, “German schmear” uses mortar instead of paint and creates a thick, textured coating on the brick that does not breathe or patina over time, giving a permanently rustic look rather than a naturally aging finish.
