= Porcelain tile =

Type of tile commonly used to cover floors and walls

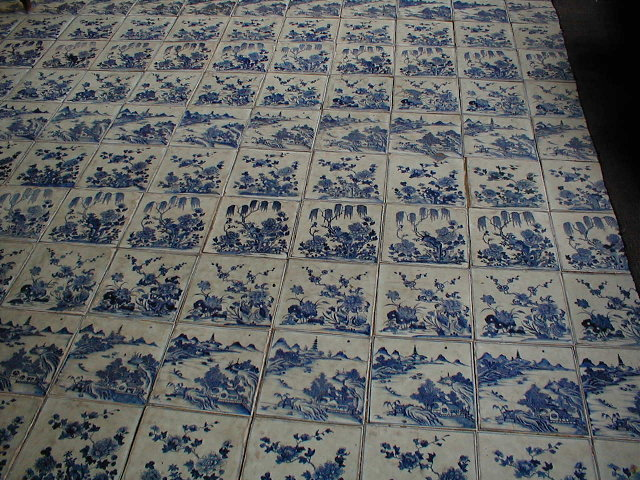
Hand-painted Chinese porcelain tiles on the floor of a Jewish synagogue in Cochin, Kerala, India

Porcelain tiles are a dense, vitrified ceramic tiles characterised by a water absorption less 0.5 per cent. Modern standards include ISO 13006 and BS EN 14411. Unlike other ceramic tiles porcelain tiles are engineered to achieve a near-total elimination of internal porosity through a combintion of raw material selection, high-pressure mechanical shaping and high-temperature firing.

Historically, porcelain was not a common material for tiles, which were much more often made of terracotta or stoneware. The first porcelain tiles were made in China, and were largely used for decorating walls, such as in the 15th-century Porcelain Tower of Nanjing (largely destroyed during Taiping Rebellion but recently reconstructed); the use of porcelain tile as wall decoration long remained typical. In Europe, palaces also occasionally featured a few rooms with walls decorated in porcelain plaques, often with forms in high relief. These were manufactured by Capodimonte porcelain and Real Fábrica del Buen Retiro, among others. Historically, porcelain was too expensive for most tiling purposes, but it is now much cheaper and is widely used.

Modern porcelain tiles can often reach 1,600 x 3,200 mm, with specialist manufacturers achieving 1,840 x 3,300 mm.

== Production ==
=== Formulation ===
The performance characteristics of porcelain are dictated by the ratio of refractory and fluxing minerals. A modern body typically consists of the following dry-weight proportions:

- Kaolin and ball clay (40% – 50%): these hydrous aluminium silicates provide the necessary plasticity for the shaping phase. Kaolin ensures a light-coloured fired body while ball clay contributes to "green strength", allowing the unfired tile to maintain its shape during transport.
- Feldspar (35% – 45%): primarily potassium or sodium-rich minerals. Feldspar acts as a fluxing agent; during firing, it melts into a liquid glass phase that fills the interstitial spaces between the more stable minerals.
- Quartz (10% – 15%): a filler that remains largely inert. It provides a structural framework that prevents the tile from deforming or excessive shrinkage when the other components liquefy.
- Metallic oxides (< 5%): including iron, manganese and cobalt, these are used as pigments in through-body porcelain tiles to ensure colour uniformity throughout the entire cross-section of the material.

=== Shaping process ===
A dust-pressing method is used, which can be summarised as:

- Wet milling: the raw materials are loaded into large ball mills, rotating horizontal cylinders filled with high-density alumina grinding media. Water and deflocculants are added to create a liquid slurry.
- Granulation by spray drying: The slurry is pumped into the top of a spray drying tower and atomised through high-pressure nozzles into a stream of hot air. As the droplets fall, the water evaporates, leaving behind uniform, spherical granules. The granules are collected at the base of the tower with a controlled moisture content of 4% to 7%. This residual moisture acts as a lubricant during the pressing stage, allowing the particles to slide past one another and pack tightly without leaving air pockets.

=== Firing ===
The pressed tiles are subject to a high temperature firing process to induce permanent chemical and physical transformations. Key stages include:

- Vitrification: the tiles are processed through a roller kiln at peak temperatures around 1,200°C. At this temperature, the feldspar undergoes a phase change into a viscous liquid.
- Pore occlusion: through capillary action, this liquid glass phase fills the microscopic pores between the quartz and clay particles. As the temperature rises, the liquid phase increases in volume and decreases in viscosity, effectively "self-sealing" the material's internal structure.
- Cooling and solidification: upon cooling, this liquid solidifies into a glass-like matrix. The resulting material is a monolithic, chemically inert and frost-resistant slab with superior mechanical properties compared to traditional ceramic tiles.

== Production locations ==
Large-scale production of porcelain tile is undertaken in many countries, with the major producers being China, Italy, India, Spain and Turkey. Smaller scale production is found in many other countries. The global ceramic and porcelain tile industry was valued at approximately $251 billion in 2023 and is projected to reach $333 billion by 2032, reflecting steady growth and widespread demand across residential and commercial sectors.

== Use ==
Porcelain tiles are significantly harder and more abrasion resistant than other types of ceramic tiles and consequently are often selected for more challenging environments.

The wear rating of the tile can be graded from zero to five according to methods defined in ISO 10545-7 and ASTM C1027 for surface abrasion resistance of glazed tile, and this can be used to determine suitability for various end-use conditions.

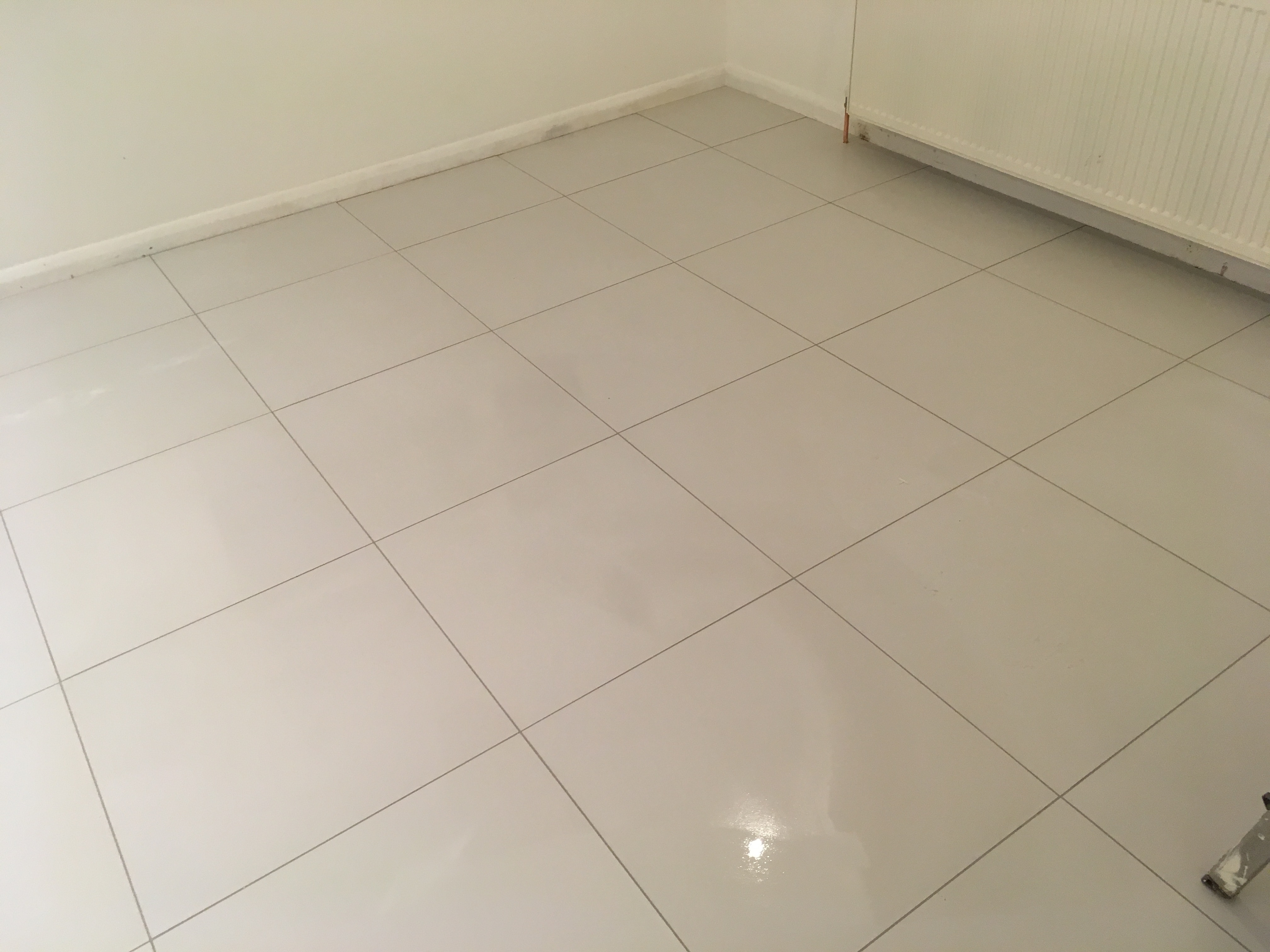
Modern polished porcelain floor tiles in a large format

=== Polished porcelain tiles ===
Polished porcelain tiles have a high-lustre, reflective upper surface through a mechanical grinding process rather than the application of a glaze. Buffing the tile surface with diamond-tipped discs results in smooth, glass-like texture. While this process enhances the material's aesthetic appeal and light-reflecting properties, making it a popular choice for high-end residential and commercial interiors, the grinding action may simultaneously open microscopic pores on the surface, rendering the tile more susceptible to deep-seated staining unless treated with a penetrating sealant. It possesses a lower coefficient of friction and requires more diligent maintenance compared to its glazed counterparts.

== Installation ==
=== Cutting ===
Manual cutting methods, such as scoring and splitting, can also be used for porcelain paving slabs. This process involves marking the cutting line, scoring it with a chisel and hammer, and deepening the groove until the slab can be split cleanly.

=== Adhesives ===
Specialized cement is necessary for installation of porcelain tiles, and in the US specifications, are set by the Tile Council of America and supported by the Tile Contractors Association. Porcelain, being denser and heavier than ordinary ceramic tiles, needs a stronger adhesive to hold the weight on walls. Therefore, typical ready-mix adhesives are not recommended for porcelain. Standard adhesives used for porcelain tiles often include cement, redispersible polymers such as ethylene-vinyl acetate, silica sand, and additives like cellulose ethers, which enhance adhesion, flexibility, and durability.

=== Tile profiles and trims ===
Ceramic tile trims and profiles are specialized edging or transitional pieces that are used in conjunction with ceramic tiles. They serve several purposes:

1. Edge protection: Profiles protect the edges of tiles from chipping and wear.
2. Transition: They provide a smooth transition between different surface materials or tile heights.
3. Aesthetic enhancement: Profiles add a finished look, contributing to the overall design of the tiled area.

Transition profiles are used when there are two different types of flooring or tiles that meet in the middle. A transition profile can help create a smooth and seamless transition between the two. Tile trims are used to cover the edges of tiles, creating a finished look and protecting them from damage.

Profiles and trims are generally installed at the same time that the tiles are laid down.

=== Sealing ===
When porcelain is first made, it is not absorbent, but the polishing process for making the unglazed surface shiny cuts into the surface, leaving it more porous and prone to absorbing stains, in the same way as natural stone tiles. Unless they have a suitable, long-lasting treatment applied by the manufacturer, polished porcelain tiles may need sealing to make the maintenance of paving easier. Porcelain sealants are either solvent-based or water-based, which is cheaper but does not last.

=== Innovation ===
Recent advancements in porcelain tile manufacturing have focused on both performance and safety. Manufacturers now offer tiles with anti-slip finishes designed to increase traction in wet or outdoor environments. Additionally, antimicrobial surface treatments can be applied to inhibit the growth of bacteria and mold, making porcelain tiles more hygienic and suitable for high-traffic or moisture-prone areas.

== See also ==
- Ceramic tile cutter
- Thinset mortar
- Thick bed mortar
