= Glass tile =

Tiles made of glass

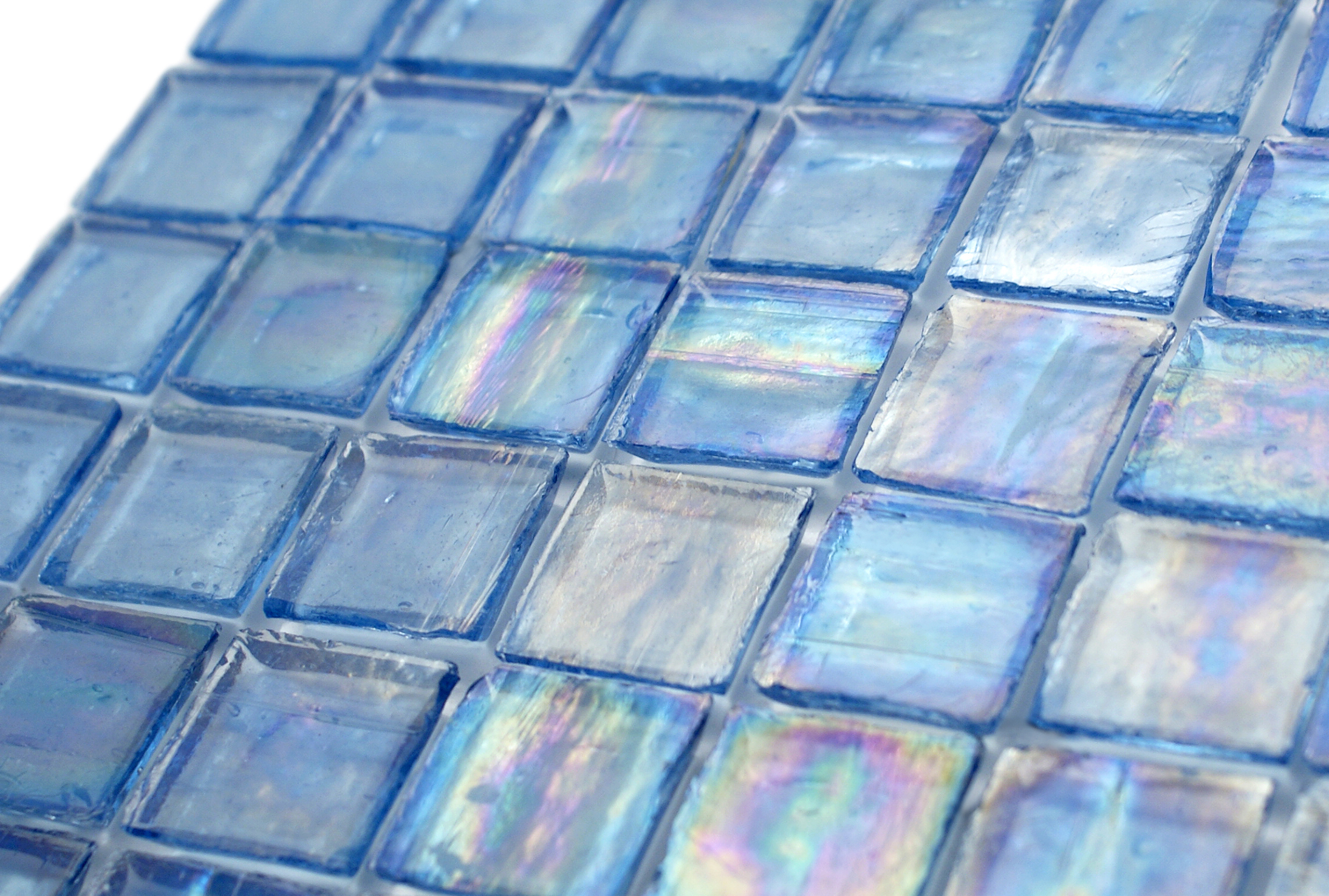
1-inch (25 mm) glass tiles

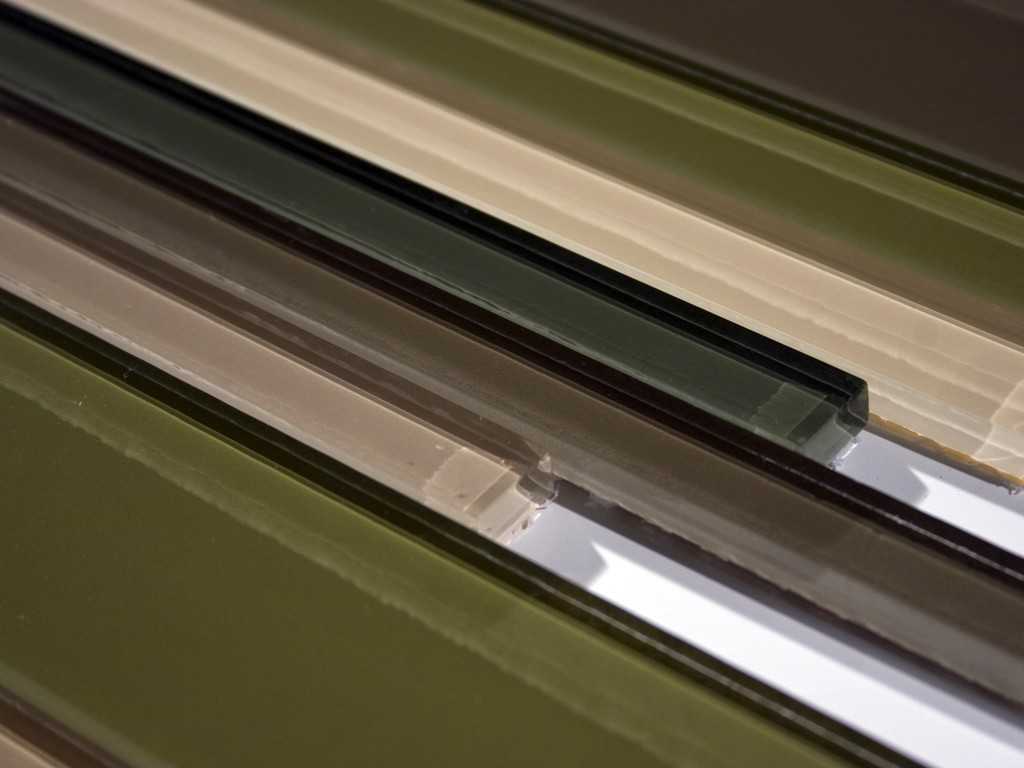
Closeup of glass tile sticks on a mesh tile square.

Glass tiles are pieces of glass formed into consistent shapes, used as a building material and decorative surface. They are produced by methods ranging from traditional opaque smalti casting to modern fused-glass and digitally printed processes.

== Early history ==
Glass was used in mosaics as early as 2500 BC, but it was not until the 3rd century BC that artisans in Greece, the Persian Empire, and India created glass tiles, reaching India during the reign of Ashoka.

Whereas clay tile is dated as early as 8,000 BC, glass tile developed more slowly, limited by the high temperatures required to melt glass and the difficulty of annealing curved shapes.

In recent years, glass tiles have become popular for both field tile and accent tiles. This trend can be attributed to recent technological breakthroughs, as well as the tiles inherent properties; in particular, their potential to impart intense color, reflect light, and remain impervious to water.

Glass tile introduces complexities to the installer. Since glass is more rigid than ceramic or porcelain tile, glass tiles break more readily under the duress of substrate shifts.

== Smalti tiles ==
Smalti tile, sometimes referred to as Byzantine glass mosaic tile, is a typically opaque glass tile originally developed for use in mosaics created during the time of the Byzantine Empire.

Smalti is made by mixing molten glass with metal oxides for color in a furnace. The result is a cloudy mixture poured into flat slabs, cooled, and broken into pieces, which can be topped with gold leaf and a protective glass film. During the Byzantine era, Constantinople became the center of the mosaic craft, and gold leaf glass mosaic found a prominent expression in the Hagia Sophia, former seat of the Orthodox patriarch of Constantinople.

Traditional smalti tiles are still found today in many European churches and are used by some present-day artisans. In the 1920s, mass production methods let smalti tile reach many middle-class homes, with molten glass poured and cooled in trays rather than rolled and cut, usually resulting in 3/4 inch chiclet-type pieces.

== Modern era ==
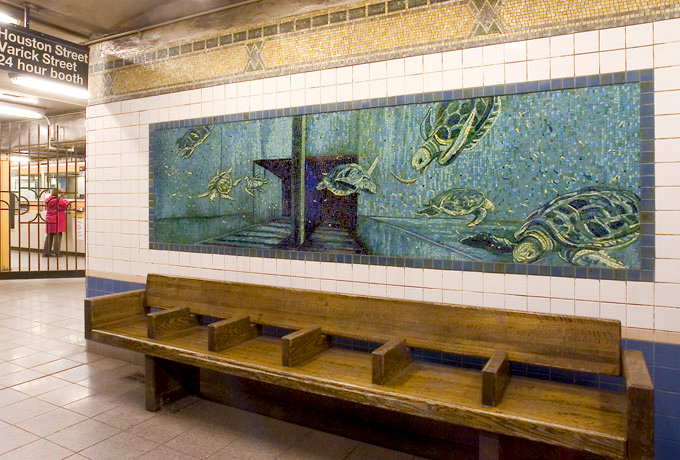
Glass mosaics of sea turtles on a subway platform

Since the 1990s, modern technologies, including methods to recreate used glass as 'green' tiles, have renewed interest in glass tile as a floor and wall cladding. It is now most commonly used in pools, kitchens, spas, and bathrooms. Although smalti tile remains popular, glass tile is now also commonly formed using cast and fused glass methods, whose plasticity has produced a wide variety of looks and applications, including floor tiles.

In the late 1990s, special glass tiles were coated on the back side with a receptive white coating. This has allowed impregnation of heat-transfer dyes by a printing process reproducing high resolution pictures and designs. Custom printed glass tile and glass tile murals exhibit the toughness of glass on the wearing surface with photo-like pictures. These are especially practical in kitchens and showers, where cleanser and moisture resistance are important.

== See also ==
- Stained glass
- Glass mosaic
- Quarry tile
