= Ceramic tile cutter =

Ceramic tile cutters are used to cut ceramic tiles to a required size or shape. They come in a number of different forms, from basic manual devices to complex attachments for power tools.

== Hand tools ==
=== Beam score cutters, cutter boards ===
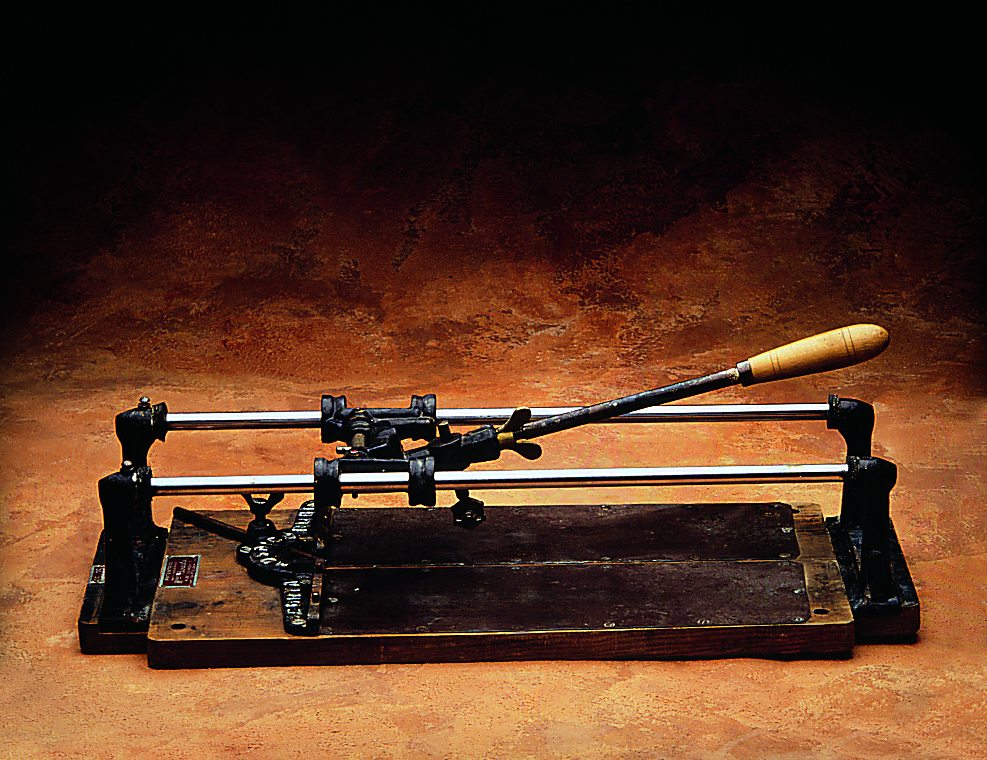
First tile cutter, invented by Boada Brothers

The ceramic tile cutter works by first scratching a straight line across the surface of the tile with a hardened metal wheel and then applying pressure directly below the line and on each side of the line on top. Snapping pressure varies widely, some mass-produced models exerting over 750 kg.

The cutting wheel and breaking jig are combined in a carriage that travels along one or two beams to keep the carriage angled correctly and the cut straight. The beam(s) may be height adjustable to handle different thicknesses of tiles.

The base of the tool may have adjustable fences for angled cuts and square cuts and fence stops for multiple cuts of exactly the same size.

The scoring wheel is easily replaceable.

==== History ====
The first tile cutter was designed to facilitate the work and solve the problems that masons had when cutting a mosaic of encaustic tiles (a type of decorative tile with pigment, highly used in 1950s), due to the high strength needed because of the high hardness and thickness of these tiles.

Over the time the tool evolved, incorporating elements that made it more accurate and productive. The first cutter had an iron point to scratch the tiles. It was later replaced by the current tungsten carbide scratching wheel.

Another built-in device introduced in 1960 was the snapping element. It allowed users to snap the tiles easily and not with the bench, the cutter handle or hitting the tile with a knee as it was done before. This was a revolution in the cutting process of the ceramic world.

=== Tile nippers ===
Tile nippers are similar to small pairs of pincers, with part of the width of the tool removed so that they can be fit into small holes. They can be used to break off small edges of tiles that have been scored or nibble out small chips enlarging holes etc.

=== Glass cutter ===
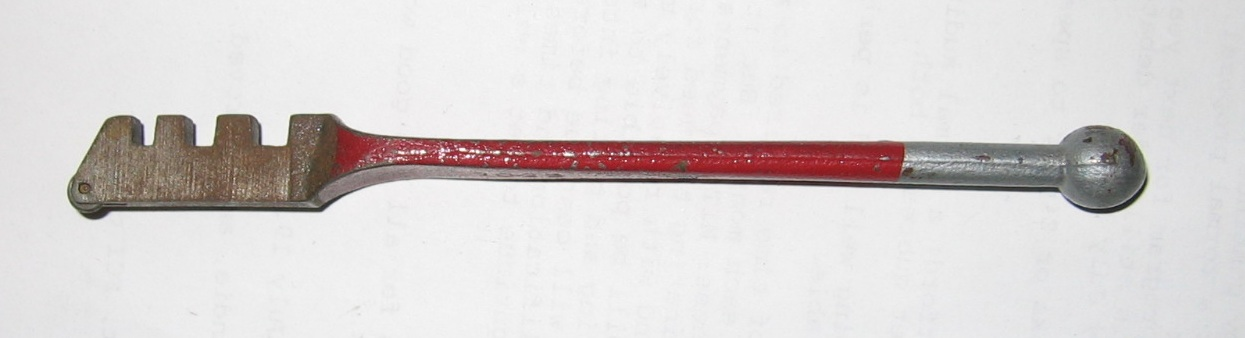
A glass cutter

A simple hand held glass cutter is capable of scoring smooth ceramic glaze surface allowing the tile to be snapped.

== Power tools ==
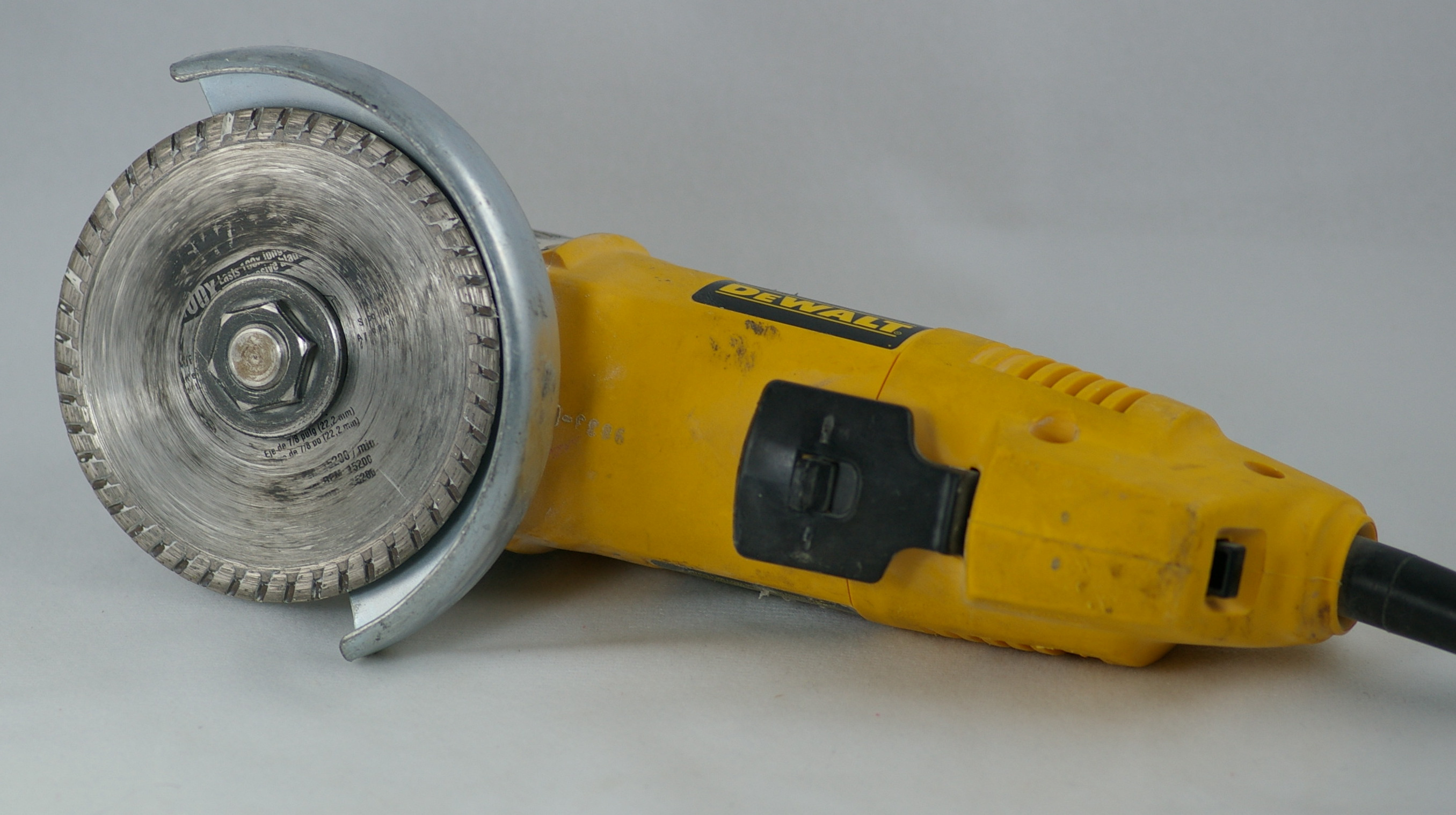
A grinder with a diamond blade for cutting tile

The harder grades of ceramic tiles, such as fully vitrified porcelain tiles, stone tiles, and some clay tiles with textured surfaces, have to be cut with a diamond blade. The diamond blades are mounted in:

=== Angle grinders ===
An angle grinder can be used for short, sometimes curved cuts. It can also be used for L-shaped cuts and for making holes. It can be used dry and, more rarely, wet.

=== Tile saws ===
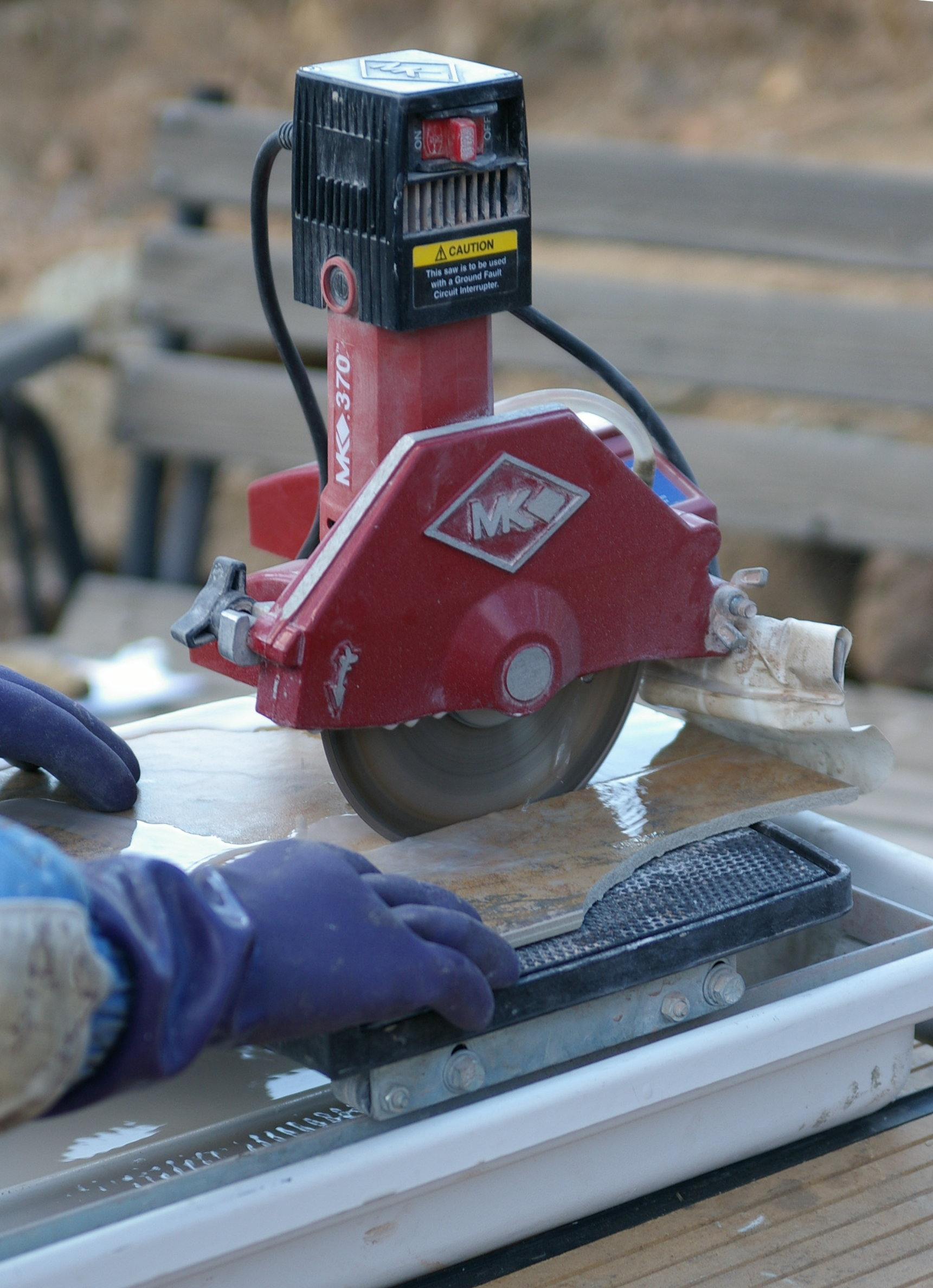
A tile saw with a water-cooled diamond blade in use

- Dedicated tile saws are designed to be used with water as a coolant for the diamond blade.
- They are available in different sizes.
- Adjustable fences for angled cuts and square cuts.
- Fence stops for multiple cuts of exactly the same size.

== Gallery ==
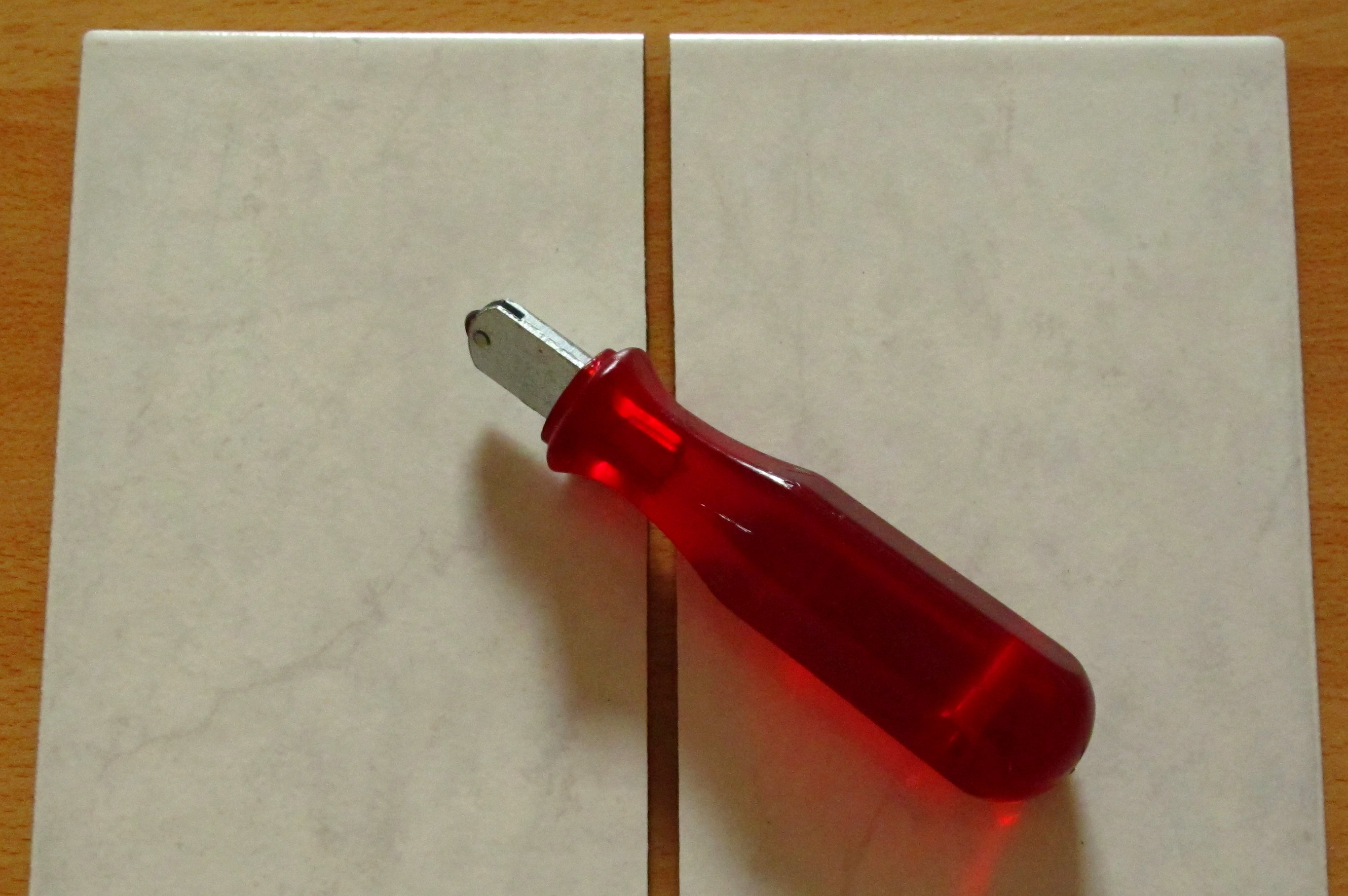
Simple glass cutter used to cut ceramic tile

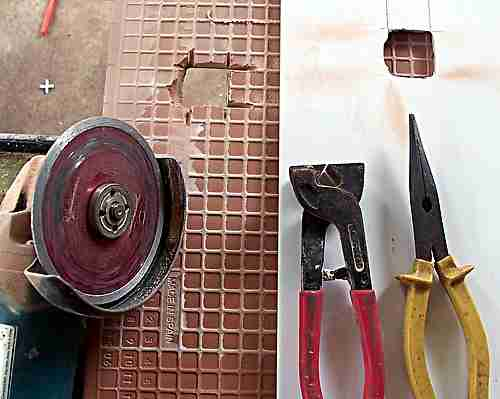
100 mm (3.9 in) angle grinder with diamond blade, with tiling snips being used to cut holes in tiles

== See also ==
- Diamond tool
- Dimension stone
- Encaustic tile
- Glass tiles
- Hand tool
- Porcelain tile
- Power tool
- Quarry tile
