= Quarry tile =

Building material

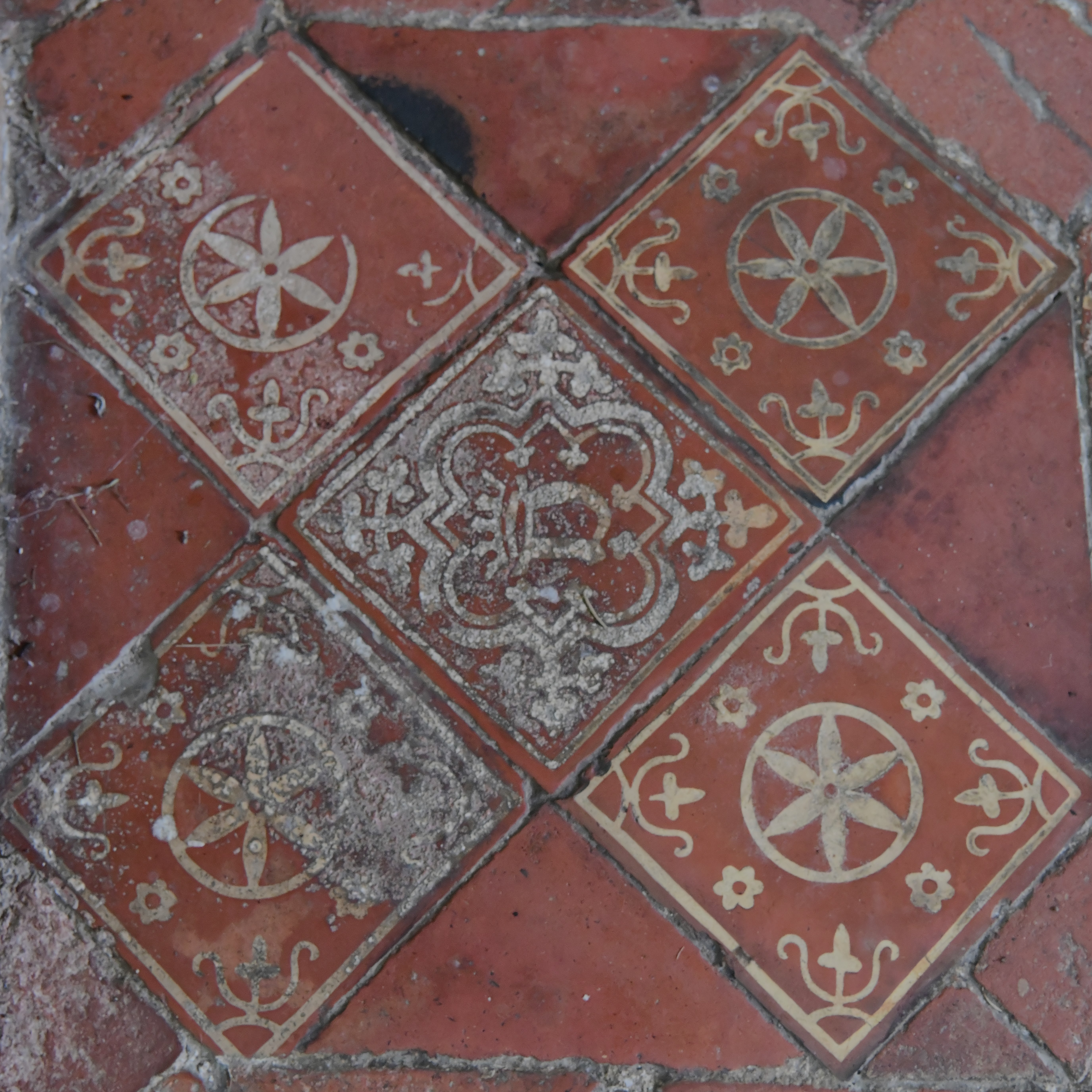
Decorated quarry tile floors of a church in Gloucestershire, England

Quarry tile is a building material, usually 1/2 to 3/4 inch (13 to 19 mm) thick, made by either the extrusion process or more commonly by press forming and firing natural clay or shales, at a high temperature, about 2,000 °F (1,000 °C). Quarry tile is manufactured from clay in a manner similar to bricks.

== Sizes and shapes ==
The most traditional size in the US is nominally 6 by 6 by 1/2 inch (15.2 cm × 15.2 cm × 1.3 cm) thick. Other common sizes include 4 by 8 inches (100 mm × 200 mm) and 8 by 8 inches (200 mm × 200 mm).

In the UK, traditional surface dimensions generally vary from 6 by 6 inches (15 cm × 15 cm), to 12 by 12 inches (30 cm × 30 cm). Such tiles, given the generally local and non-standardised production, commonly vary between those dimensions, but rarely stray outside of them.

Modern quarry tiles are generally thinner than their historic counterparts, sometimes as thin as 5/16 inch (7.9 mm); by comparison, older tiles were rarely thinner than 3/4 inch (19 mm) in and could be as thick as 1 1/4 inches (32 mm) thick.

Additionally, modern tiles can be found in different shapes, such as rectangular.

== Finishes ==
Traditional quarry tiles were unglazed and either red, grey, or black/very dark blue; however, modern "decorator" tiles come in a variety of tints and finishes. Industrial quarry tile is available with abrasive frit embedded in the surface to provide a non-slip finish in wet areas such as commercial kitchens and laboratories.

== Uses ==
Quarry tile is extensively used for floors where a very durable material is required. It can be used either indoors or outdoors, although freeze-resistant grades of tile should be used outdoors in climates where freeze-thaw action occurs. Quarry tile is used less often as a wall finish and is occasionally used for countertops, although the wide grout joints can make cleaning of countertops difficult. Most commercial kitchens require a quarry tile to be used because of its slip resistant and non-porous properties.

== Installation ==
For floors, quarry tile is usually set in a thick bed of cementitious mortar. For wall applications, it can be set in either a thick bed of cementitious mortar or a thin bed of mastic. For both floors and walls, the joints between tiles are usually grouted with cementitious grout. Grout joints are traditionally about 3/8 inch (9.5 mm) in width. Matching trim shapes such as coves, bases, shoes, and bullnoses are available to turn corners and terminate runs of the tile.

For traditional/historic applications, tiles were generally laid in lime mortar, doubling as grout, and with very fine grout joints (sometimes butted without joints, similarly to mosaic tiles).

Due to the typically square shape, quarry tiles were historically, and still today, restricted to either square or diamond patterns.

== See also ==
- Ceramic tile
- Ceramic tile cutter
