= Mud March (American Civil War) =

Union offensive during the American Civil War

Coordinates: 38.3596°N 77.5191°W

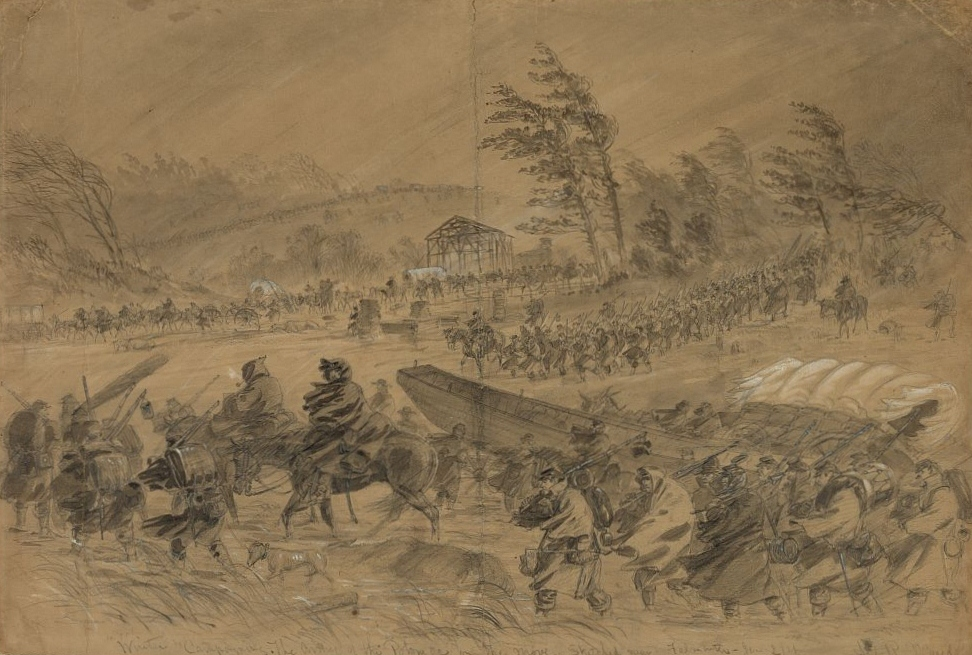
"Winter Campaigning"

The Mud March was an abortive offensive by Union Major General Ambrose Burnside and his Army of the Potomac in January 20–22, 1863, during the American Civil War. Burnside had been repulsed by the Army of Northern Virginia under Confederate General Robert E. Lee in Burnside's first attempt to cross the Rappahannock River during the Battle of Fredericksburg in December 1862. The Mud March was Burnside's second attempt at crossing the Rappahannock to capture the Confederate capital of Richmond, Virginia.

The strategy was sound in theory, but it failed because of dissension among generals in the Army of the Potomac, compounded by severe winter storms.

== History ==
Following his defeat in the disastrous Battle of Fredericksburg in December 1862, Burnside was desperate to restore his reputation and the morale of his Army of the Potomac. The day after Christmas, he began making preparations for a new offensive. This would involve feints at the fords upstream of Fredericksburg to distract the Confederates while he took the bulk of the Army across the Rappahannock River seven miles south of town. Finally, he planned for a cavalry operation on a grand scale, something that had never been done so far in the Eastern Theater, where so far Union horsemen had performed poorly and suffered repeated embarrassments at the hands of their Confederate foes.

Burnside detailed 1500 troopers for this planned operation. Five hundred of them would create a distracting feint in the Warrenton-Culpeper direction and then withdraw back to Falmouth. Meanwhile, the main force was to cross at Kelly's Ford and swing south and west in a wide arc, all the way around and south of Richmond and ultimately arriving at Suffolk on the coast where a Union force under Brigadier General John J. Peck was based. Then transport ships would take them back to Falmouth.

It was an imaginative and inspired plan, but once again doomed to failure. The cavalry set off on their journey, but almost as soon as they reached Kelly's Ford, Burnside received a telegram from President Abraham Lincoln, stating flatly "No major army movements are to be made without first informing the White House." He was left bewildered at how the president had found out, since he had told no one except a few intimates about his plans, and even most of the army's high-ranking officers didn't know about it.

Burnside had been betrayed by conspirators in his own camp, specifically Brigadier General John Newton and Brigadier General John Cochrane, division and brigade commanders in the VI Corps. The day after New Year's Day, the two took a leave of absence and headed up to Washington D.C., with the intention of meeting with Senator Henry Wilson and Congressman Moses Odell of New York, both important heads of both Senate and House of Representatives Congressional defense committees. The generals forgot that Congress was in recess for the holidays and neither representative was in town.

As Cochrane himself had been a congressman at the start of the war, he had political connections and thus got in a meeting with Secretary of State William H. Seward, who then arranged for them to meet the president. As the senior of the two officers, Newton spoke first. He told Lincoln that the Army of the Potomac was in terrible shape now, such that it would likely fall apart if Burnside tried to start another campaign. However, his choice of wording was vague and he failed to properly explain what he meant. Later on, Newton would argue "I could not have told the president that none of the privates had any confidence in General Burnside," even though that was the principal reason he'd come to Washington.

Lincoln assumed he was simply meeting with two scheming officers who were out to take their superior's job, something he'd already seen all too often. Cochrane assured that neither of them had any ulterior motives and simply wished to keep the president informed on developments he needed to know. Newton then repeated his warning that conditions had gotten to the point where the army would disintegrate in the event Burnside lost another battle along the Rappahannock. The two left, suggesting that Lincoln ought to look into things himself.

After receiving Lincoln's telegram, Burnside headed to the White House himself to investigate. The president told him that two generals who would remain anonymous had told him about his plans and the army's deteriorating condition. Burnside angrily protested that these officers, whoever they were, deserved to be court-martialed. General-in-Chief Henry Halleck (who was in the room just then) agreed. More importantly, Lincoln argued that there seemed to be a considerable disconnect between the commanding general and his subordinates.

Burnside then requested a private discussion with the president, where he proceeded to denounce Secretary of War Edwin M. Stanton and General Halleck, arguing that "it would be for the good of the nation if both were replaced". He also added that none of his senior officers supported his plan for a midwinter offensive. Finally, the general said that the way things were going, he might as well resign both command of the Army of the Potomac and his commission and leave the military entirely.

Once Burnside left, Lincoln told Halleck that none of his generals were willing to cooperate with his plans, and he (Halleck) ought to go down to Fredericksburg himself and assess the situation. Halleck for his part had no advice to offer Burnside except to destroy the Confederate army while taking as little damage as possible. Lincoln also told Burnside to reconsider resigning from the army.

Burnside revived his plan with changes. Instead of crossing the Rappahannock south of Fredericksburg, he initially planned to move upstream and cross at U.S. Ford, due north of the Chancellorsville crossroads.

The offensive began with a westward move on January 20, 1863, in unseasonably mild weather. Burnside, with a head start, altered his plan to aim at Banks' Ford, a closer, quicker crossing. At dawn of January 21, engineers would push five bridges across; after that, two grand divisions would be over the river in four hours. Meanwhile, another grand division would distract the Confederate troops by repeating the December crossing at Fredericksburg. During the night of the 20th, the rain began, and by the morning of the 21st, the earth was soaked and the river banks had the appearance of a quagmire. Already, fifteen pontoons were on the river, nearly spanning it, and five more were amply sufficient. Burnside began at once to bring up his artillery, which had the effect of making a perfect mortar bed. For a considerable area around the ford all day the men worked in the rain but to little purpose. Quite a number of cannon were advanced near the ford, but the 22nd only added to the storm, and the artillery, caissons and even wagons were swamped in the mud.

The storm had delayed Burnside's movements, giving Lee ample time to line the other shore with his army, although there was no attempt to interfere with his crossing except from the sharpshooters, who peppered away on all occasions. No doubt Lee was hoping Burnside would effect a crossing; with a swollen river in his rear; it would have been a sorry predicament for the Union Army indeed, but Burnside finally became resigned to his fate and gave the order for the army to retire to its quarters, and thus ended the famous mud march.

The Mud March was Burnside's final attempt to command the Army of the Potomac. Lincoln replaced him with Maj. Gen. Joseph Hooker on January 26, 1863.

== Union forces ==
Further information:

=== Strength ===
- Strength of the Army of the Potomac, Maj. Gen. Ambrose E. Burnside commanding, December 31, 1862: Official Records, Series I, Volume XXI, Part 1, page 924.

=== Organization ===
- Organization of the Army of the Potomac, Maj. Gen. Ambrose E. Burnside commanding, December 31, 1862: Official Records, Series I, Volume XXI, Part 1, pages 925-938.
