= Non-shrink grout =

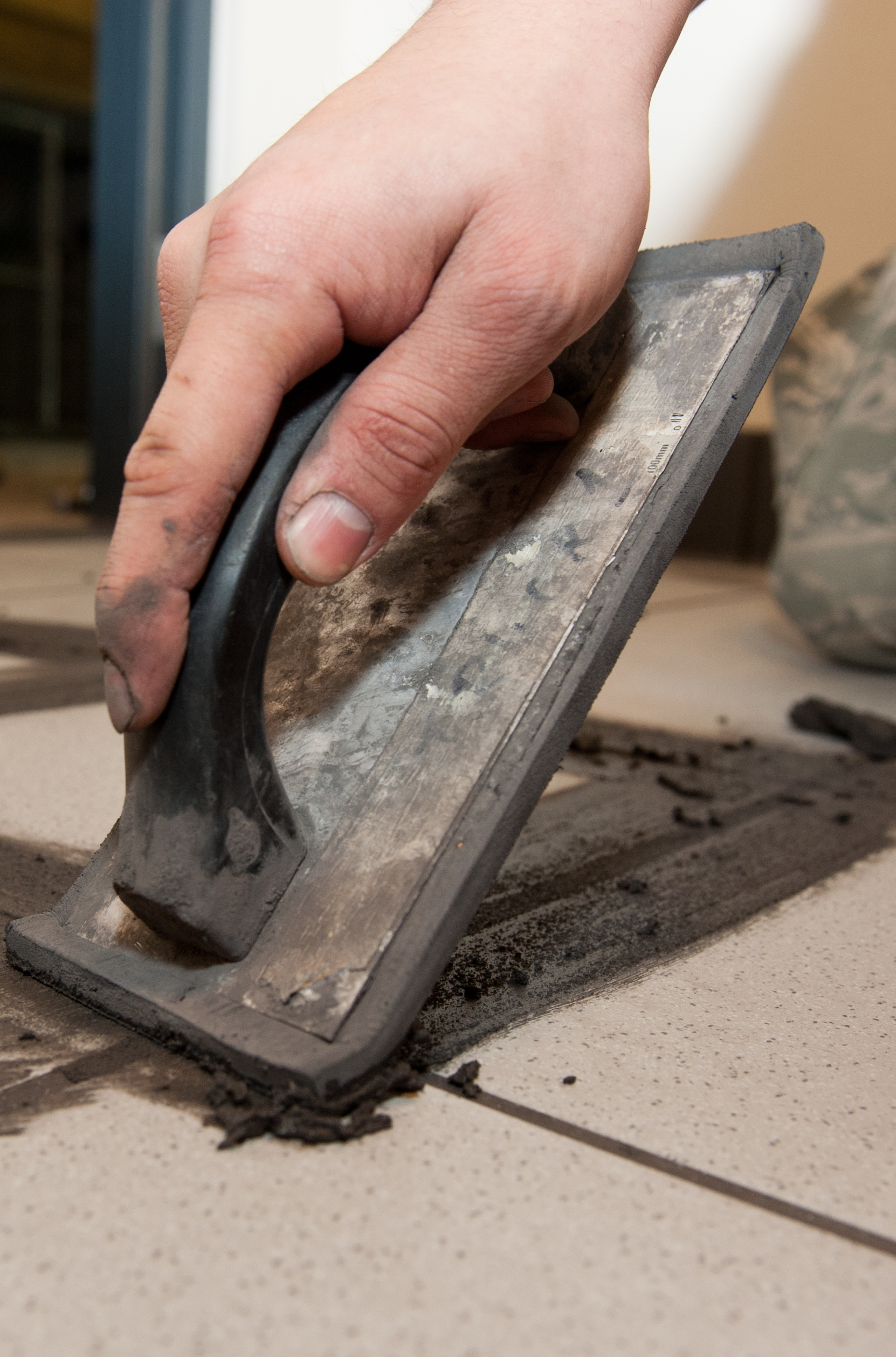
Non-shrink grout being applied to tiles

Non-shrink grout is a hydraulic cement grout that, when hardened under stipulated test conditions, does not shrink, so its final volume is greater than or equal to the original installed volume. It is often used as a transfer medium between load-bearing members.

== Testing ==
Test standards used to designate a grout as non-shrink include, but are not limited to:

- C1090-01(2005)e1 Standard Test Method for Measuring Changes in Height of Cylindrical Specimens of Hydraulic-Cement Grout
- ASTM C 1107

== Typical characteristics ==
- Often sets rapidly
- Usually a pre-mix product that needs only to be mixed with [water]
- Includes ingredients to compensate against cement stone shrinkage
- Use of shrinkage-compensating ingredients can result in volume increase over time.
- Has a high strength of over 10,000 psi or near 100 MPa per ASTM C109.

== Typical cementitious materials caveats ==
Despite the use of expanding or shrinkage-compensating ingredients, users are ordinarily cautioned to avoid environments detrimental to the forming of cement stone. These include but are not limited to the following:

- Avoid high wind across the curing surface.
- Avoid high temperatures during the cure.
- Avoid common cement poisons, such as sulphates, acids, etc.

Failure to follow these precautions can adversely affect the quality of all cementitious products.

== See also ==
- ASTM International
- Canadian Standards Association
- Deutsches Institut für Normung
