= Korogho church =

Korogho church of the Mother of God
- ქოროღოს ღვთისმშობლის ეკლესია
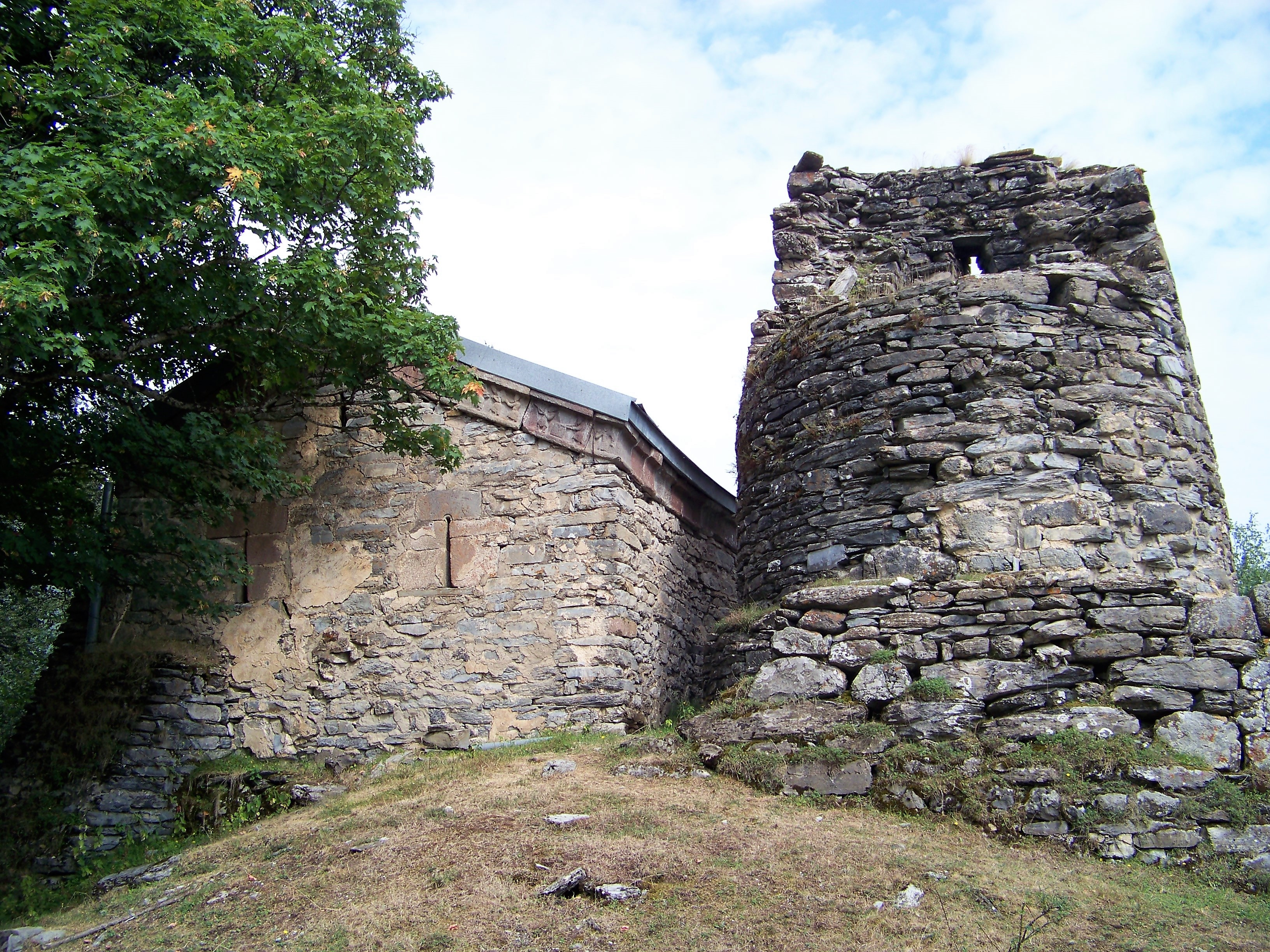
- Korogho church (western façade) and the adjoining tower
- Interactive map of Korogho church of the Mother of God
- Location: Korogho, Dusheti Municipality, Mtskheta-Mtianeti, Georgia
- Coordinates: 42.460369°N 44.522164°E
- Type: Hall church

The Korogho church of the Mother of God (Georgian: ქოროღოს ღვთისმშობლის ეკლესია, romanized: koroghos ghvtismshoblis ek'lesia) is a Georgian Orthodox church in eastern Georgia, situated in the mountainous Khada gorge in the historical and cultural province of Mtiuleti, now part of the Dusheti Municipality. Korogho is a simple hall church dated to the end of the 10th or beginning of the 11th century. It is known for a lintel with unique sculptures in relief, illustrating various stages of quarrying and construction. The church is inscribed on the list of Georgia's Immovable Cultural Monuments of National Significance.

== Layout ==
The Korogho church stands south of the village of Korogho, Dusheti Municipality, Mtskheta-Mtianeti region, on a slope of a high rocky mountain in the Khada gorge in the historical province of Mtiuleti. The church is a small and architecturally simple structure, measuring 10.8 × 7.6 m. It is built of local flagstone and schist. The elements such as vaults, conch, pilasters, piers, window frames, and cornice are made of dressed stone.

Korogho is a hall church design, covered with a gable roof, its interior being divided into two naves in the western part. The sanctuary is rectangular in plan and tripartite, all three parts vaulted with conches. Close to the church there are a three-storey defensive tower, small chapel, and ruins of several accessory structures. An 11th-century ivory icon of the Theotokos and a cross with the depiction of the Savior, found in a den of the church, is now on display at the Georgian National Museum in Tbilisi.

== Sculptures ==
The church is notable for its sculptural decoration. In the northern entrance of the church, there is a reused stone with a relief depicting three donors, one of them holding a plan of the church. A lintel on the western façade, made of large hewn plates, is adorned with sculptures depicting various aspects of construction work, from quarrying, transporting, and finishing of the stone to the workers taking refreshment. The scenes converge on an image of Our Lady of the Sign at the top of the gable, while on its either side are images of work in process, including transporting building materials, which would have been a major effort given the location of the church on the top of the mountain. The western façade also bears two inscriptions carved in a medieval Georgian asomtavruli script and paleographically dated to the 12th century.

The lintel sculpture from the Korogho church
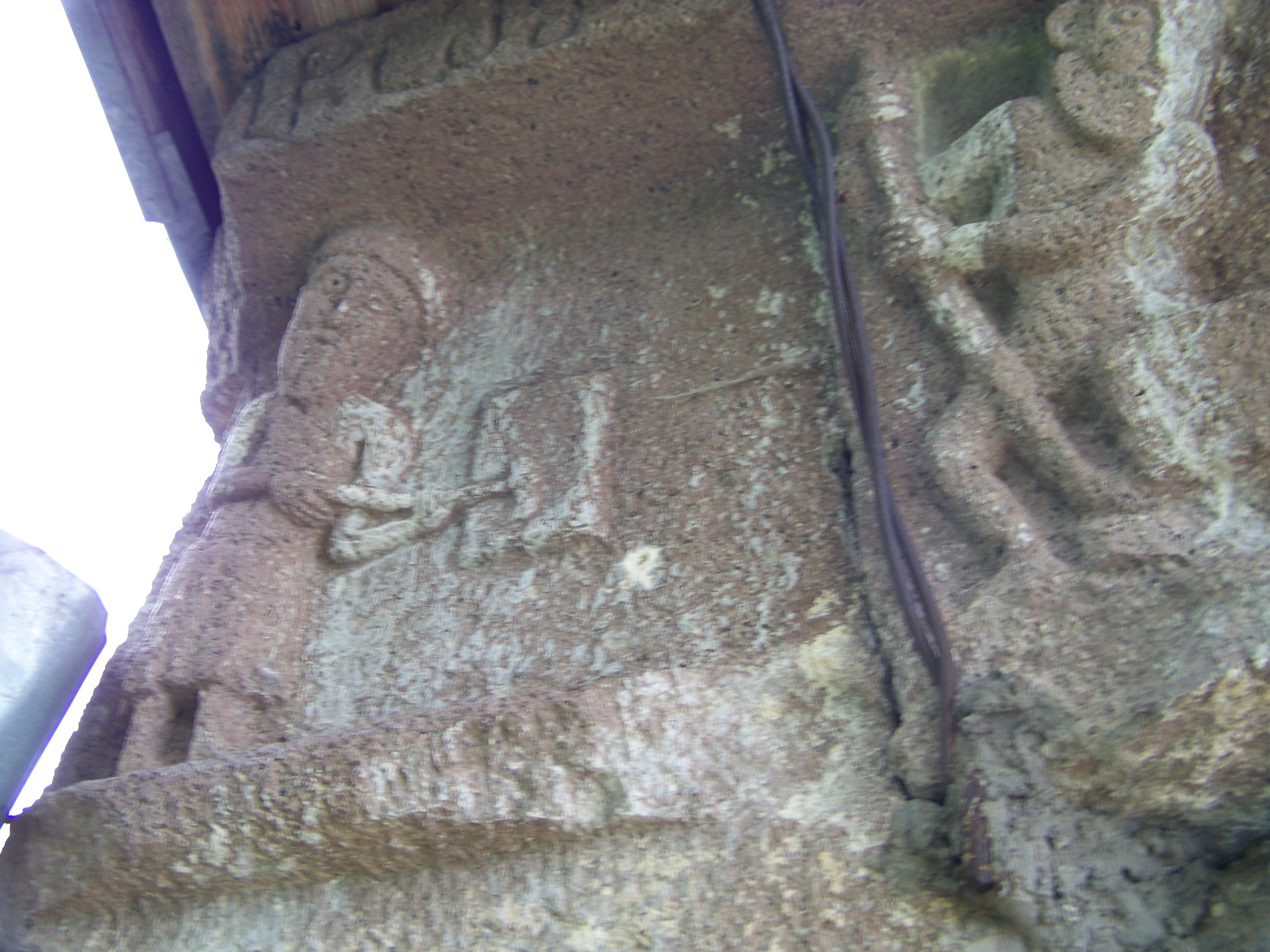
A worker removes a stone from the quarry.

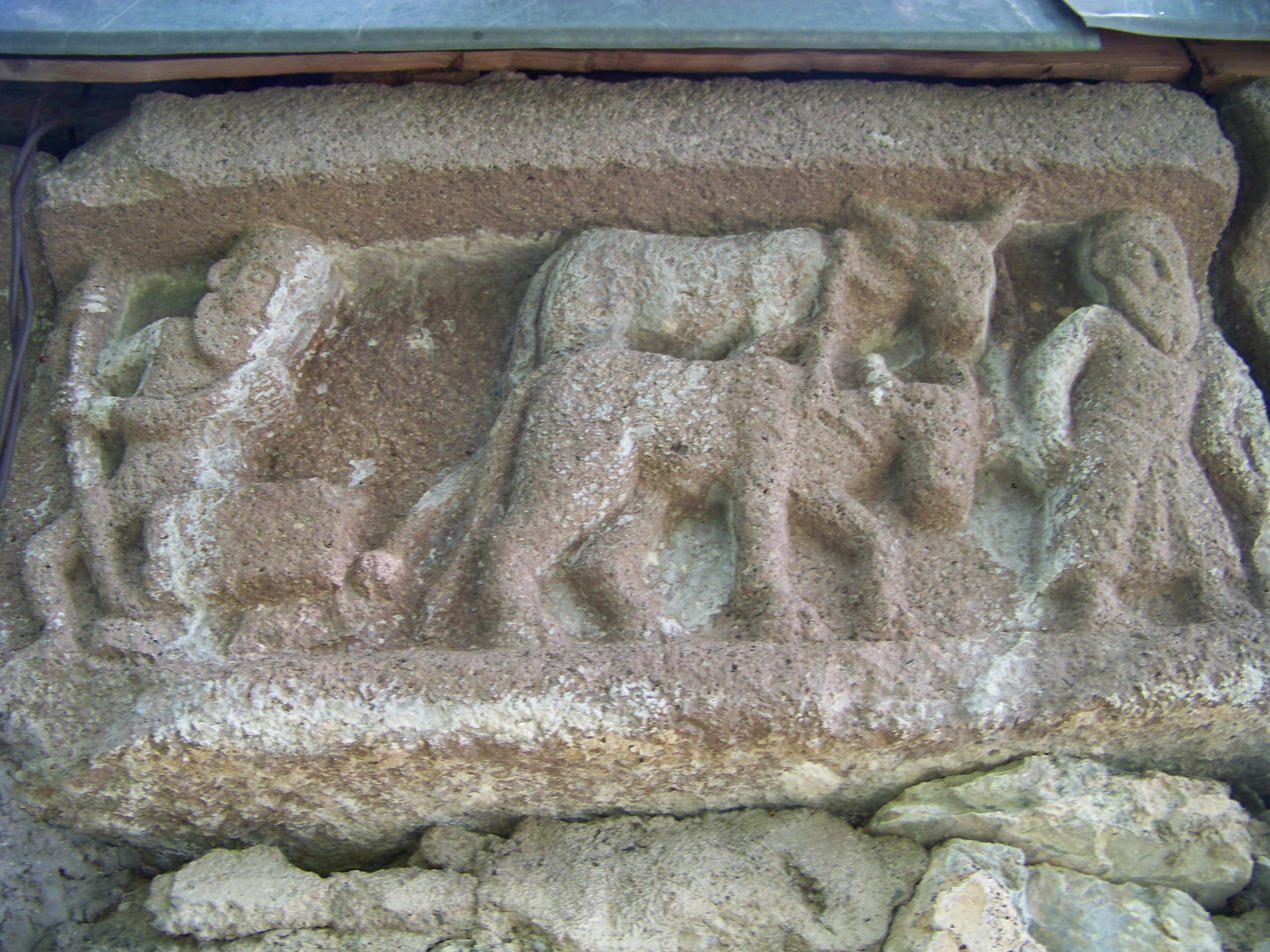
Workers position a large stone on an ox-drawn sledge.

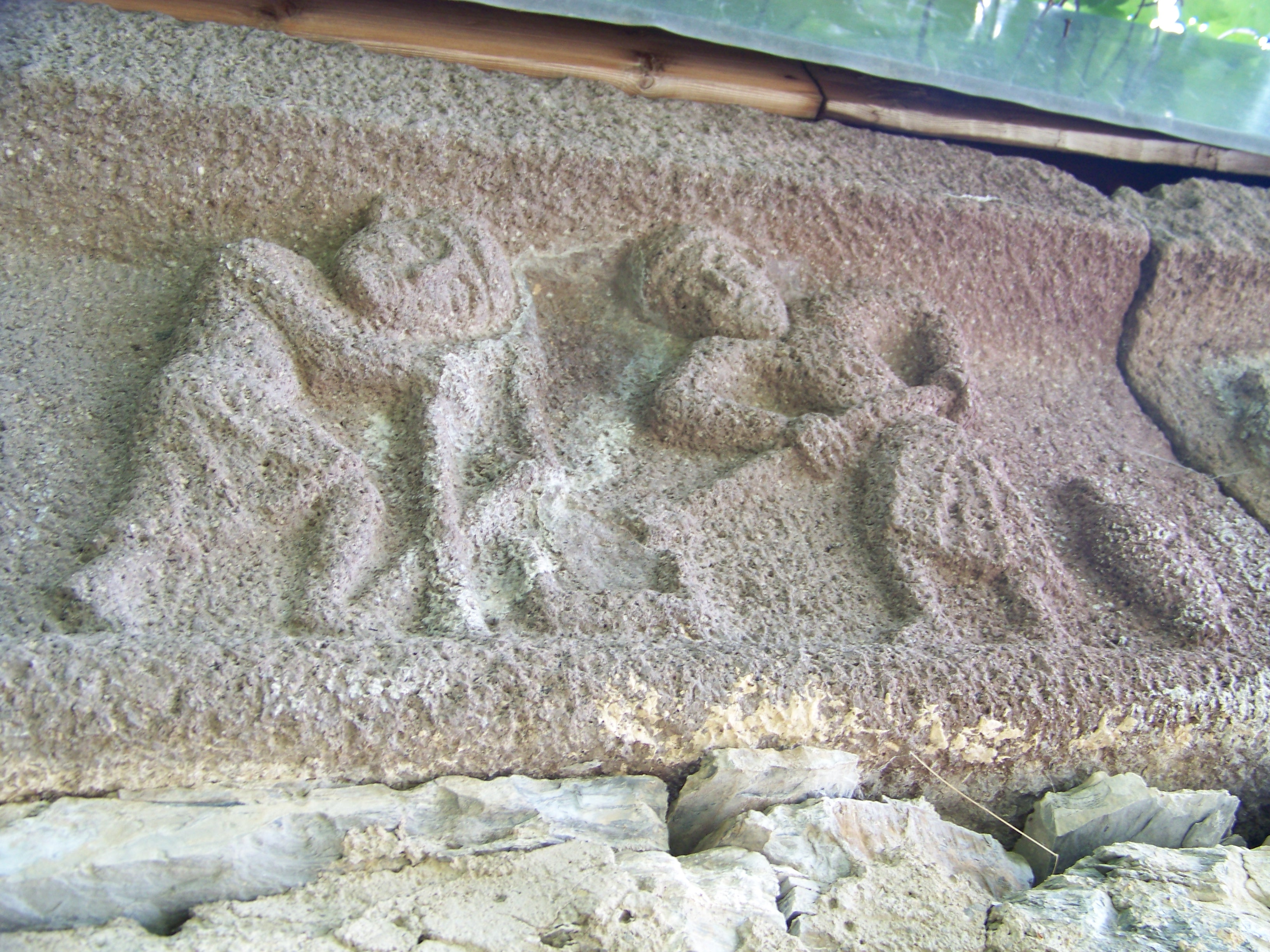
Workers prepare mortar in a trough.

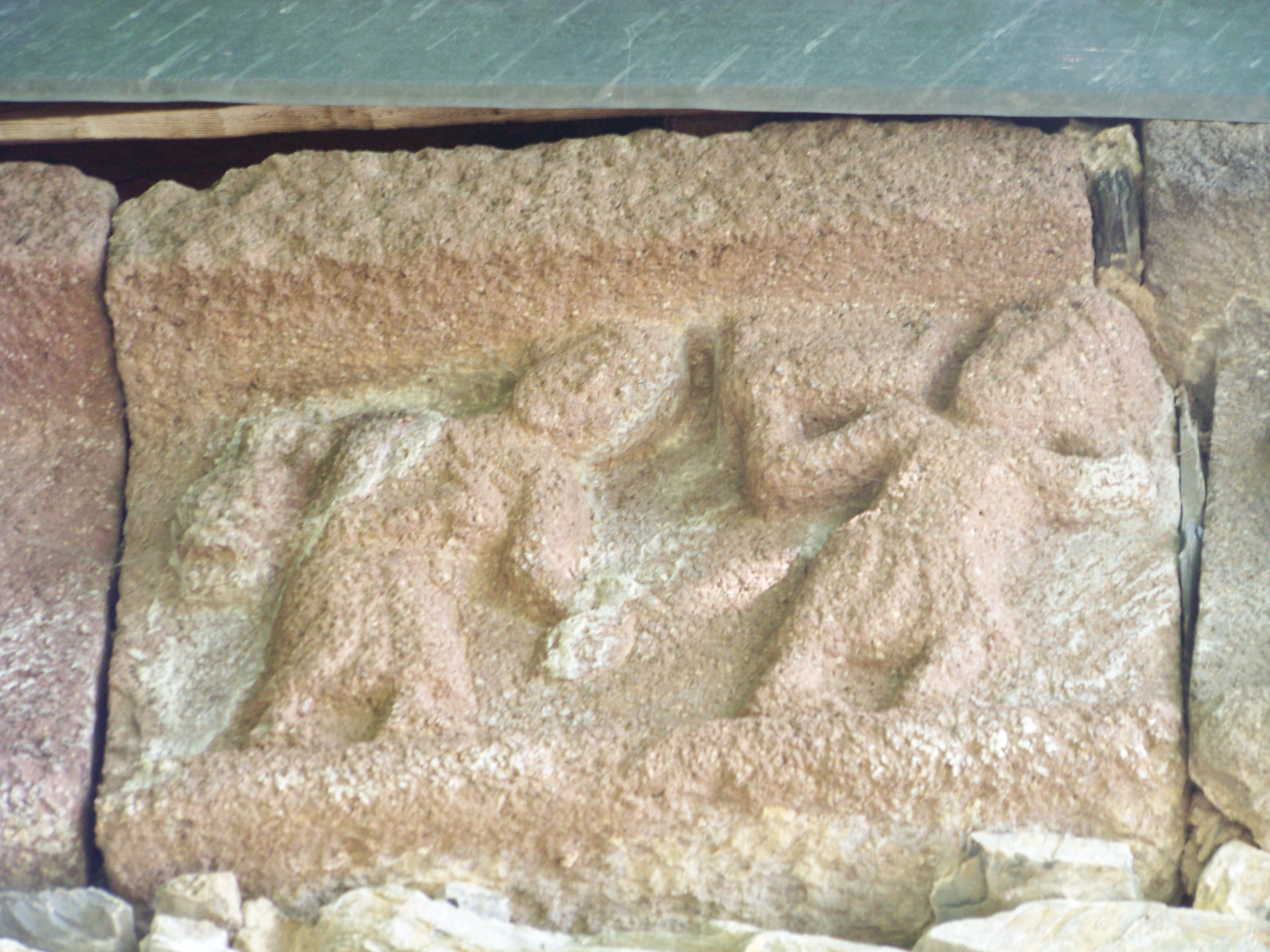
Workers carry mortar and water.

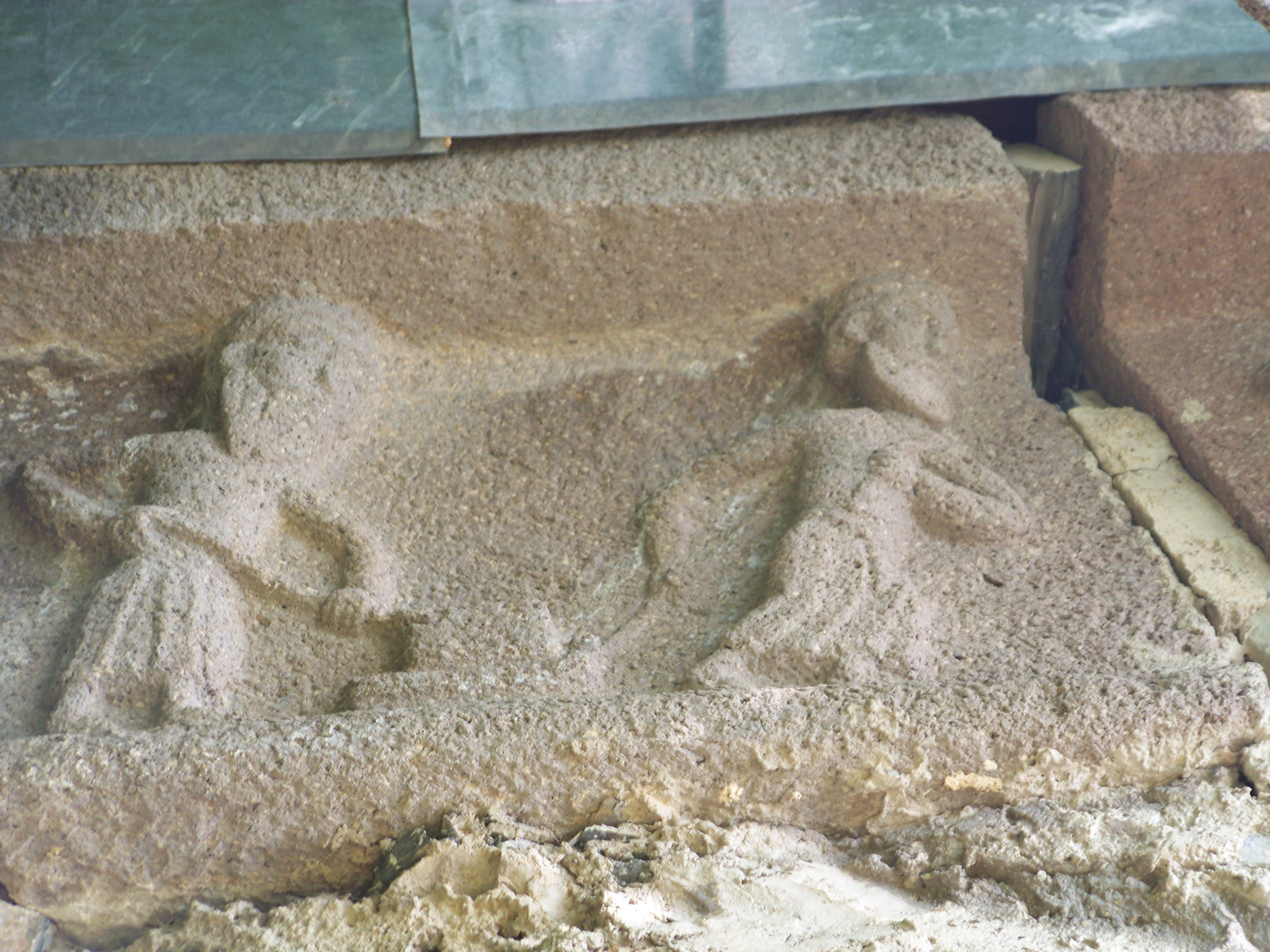
Workers transport a small stone on a sled.

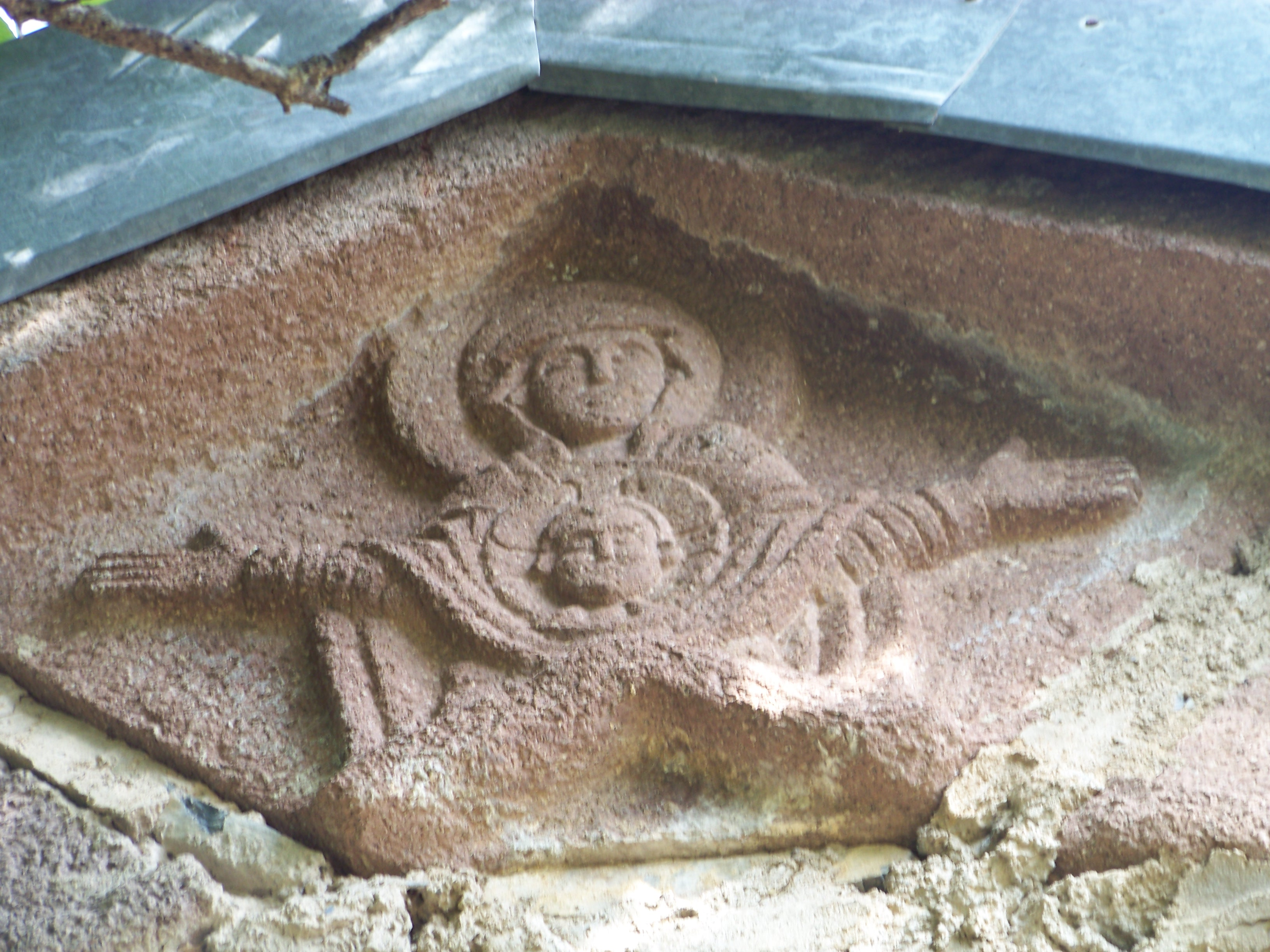
The Virgin and Child

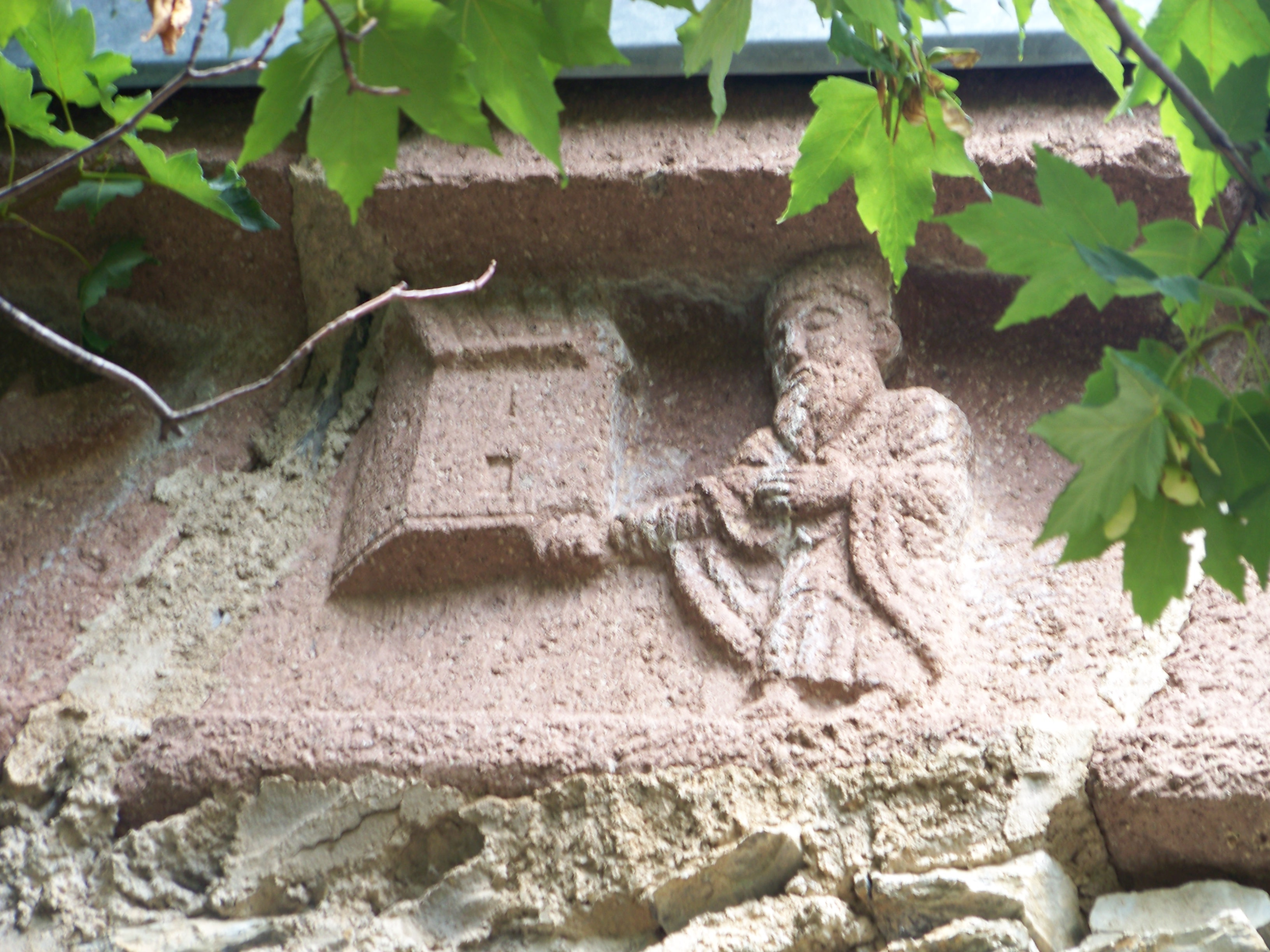
A donor presents the church to the Virgin

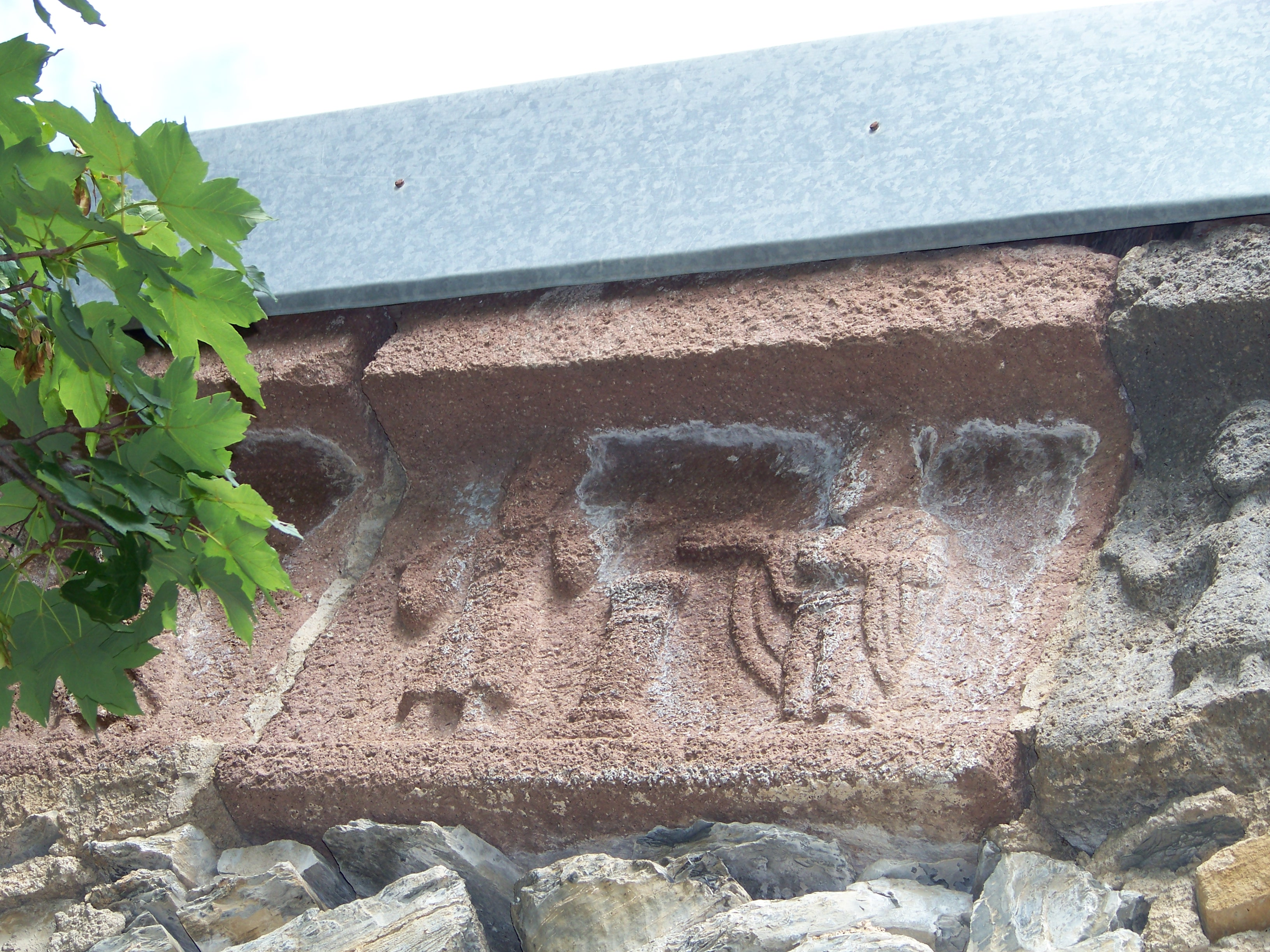
The church is dedicated.

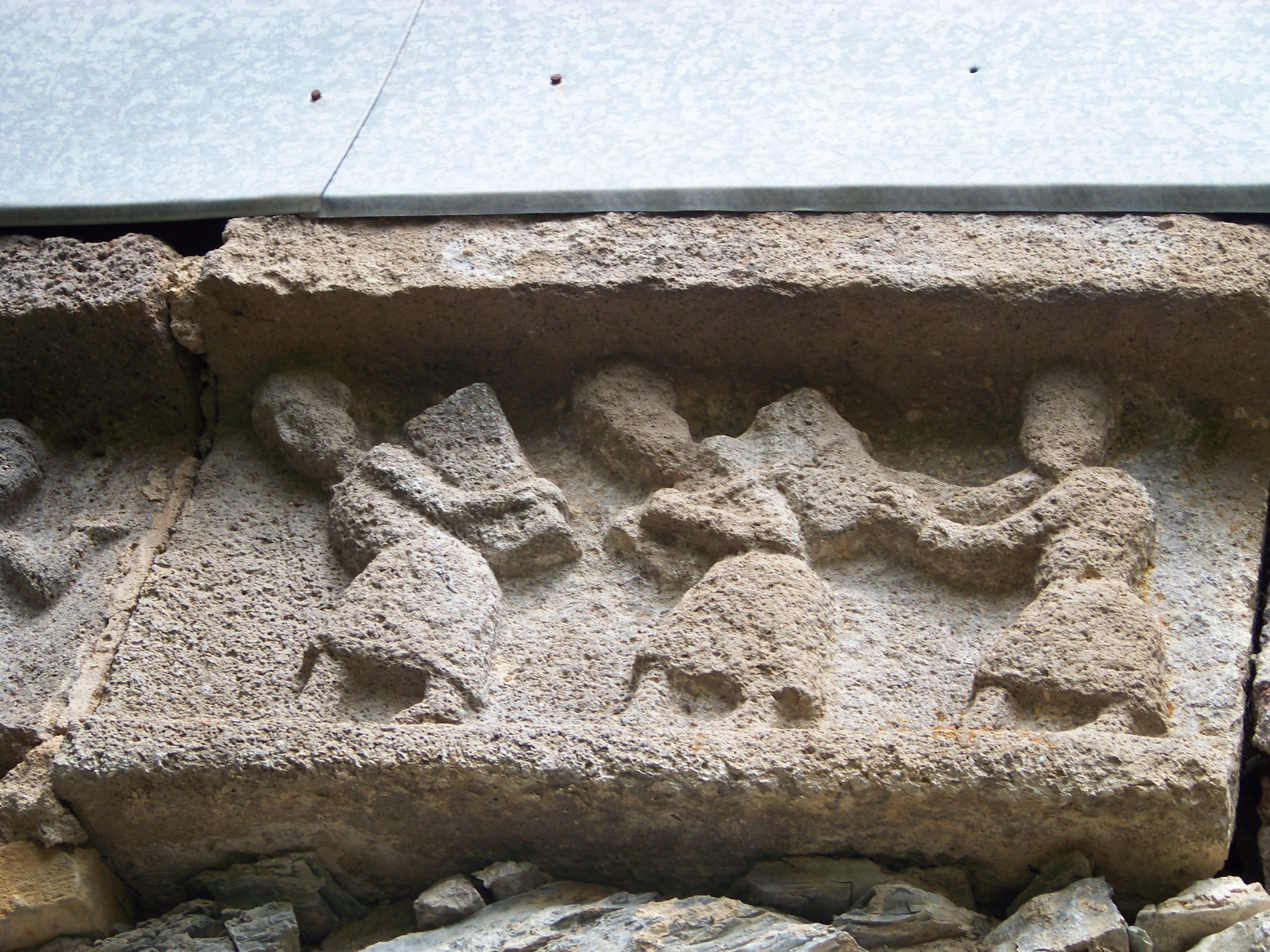
Workers transport blocks of stone.

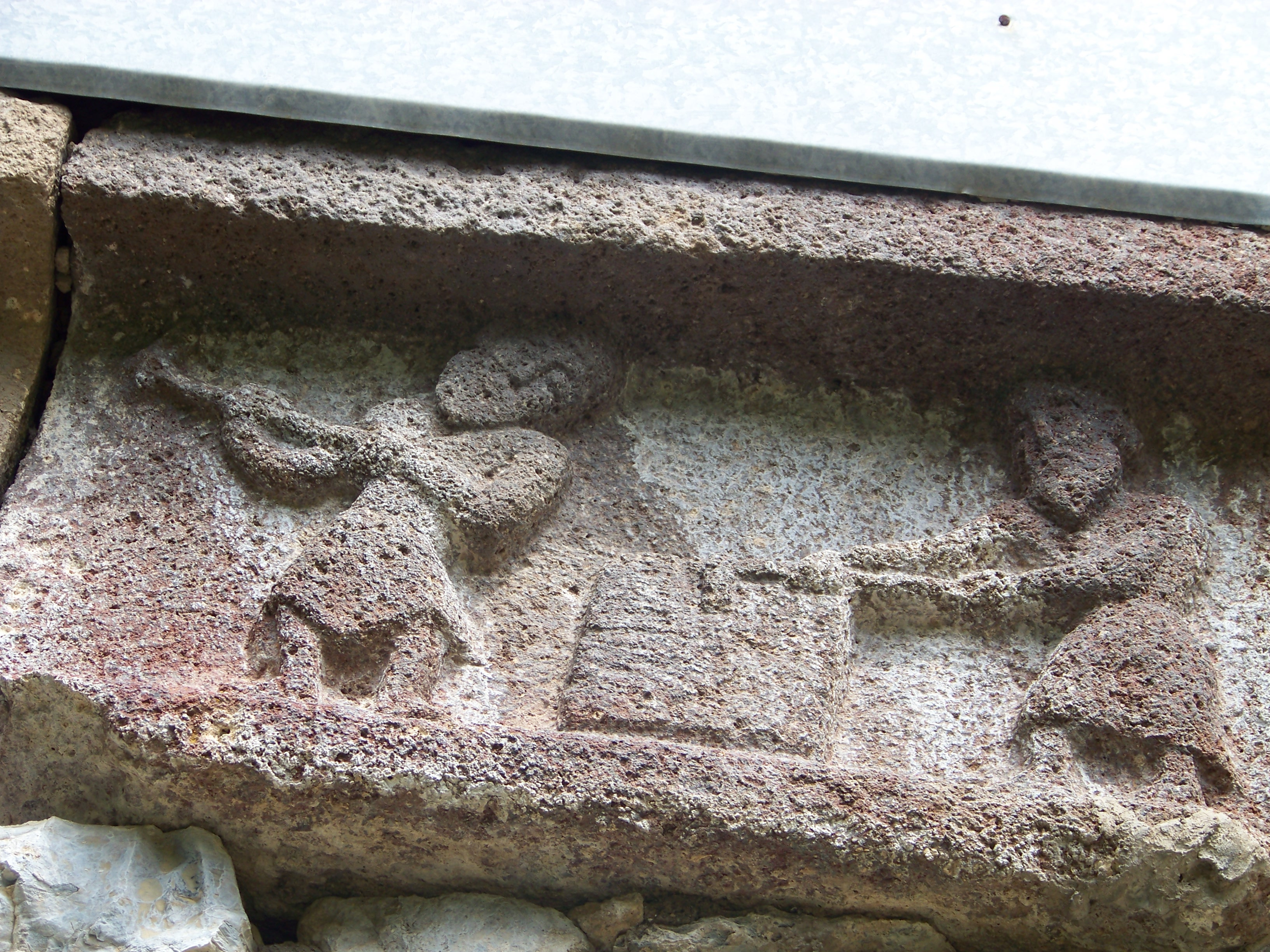
A large block of stone is shaped.

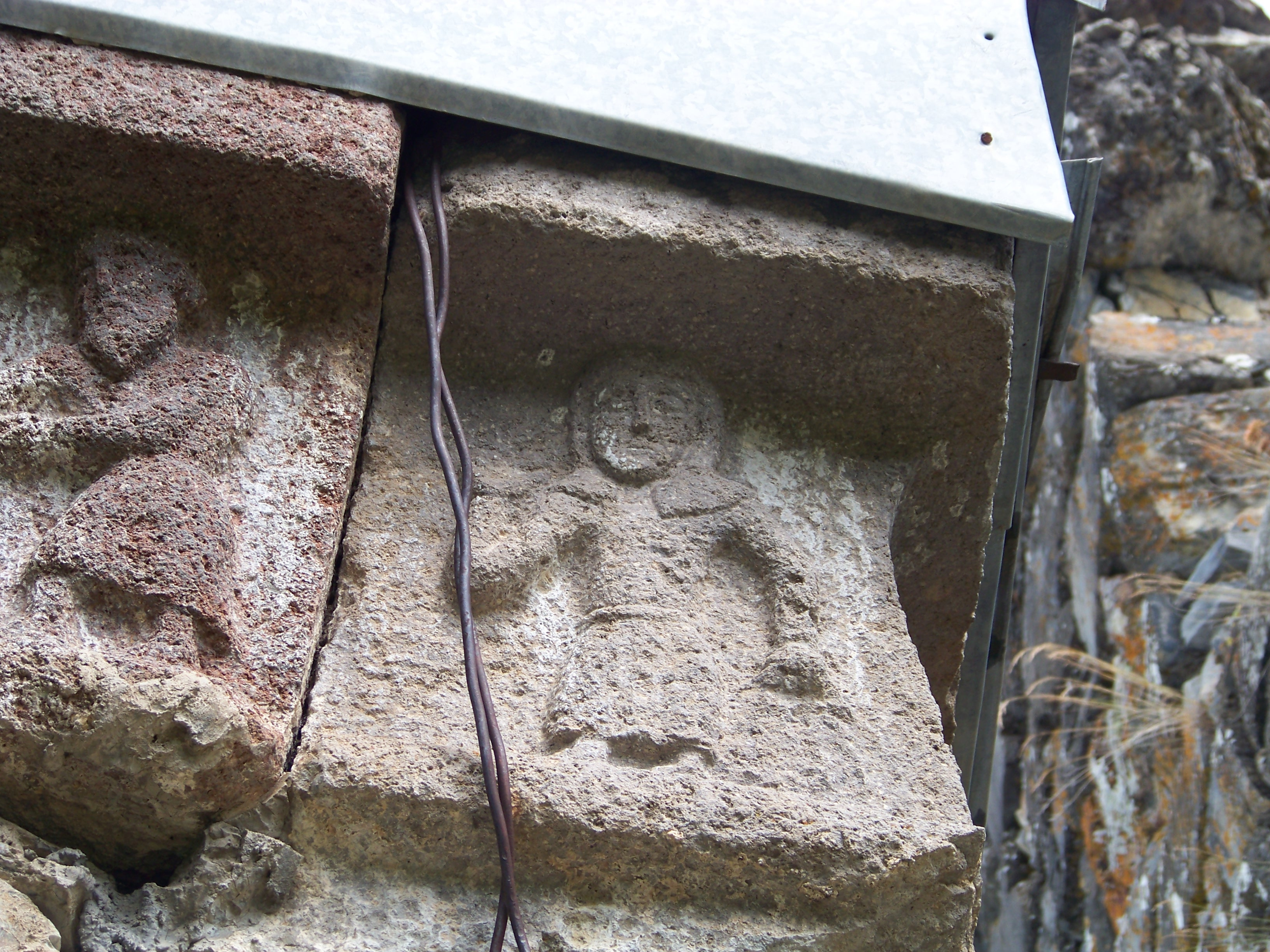
A woman brings food and drink to the workers.
