= Grout =

Building material

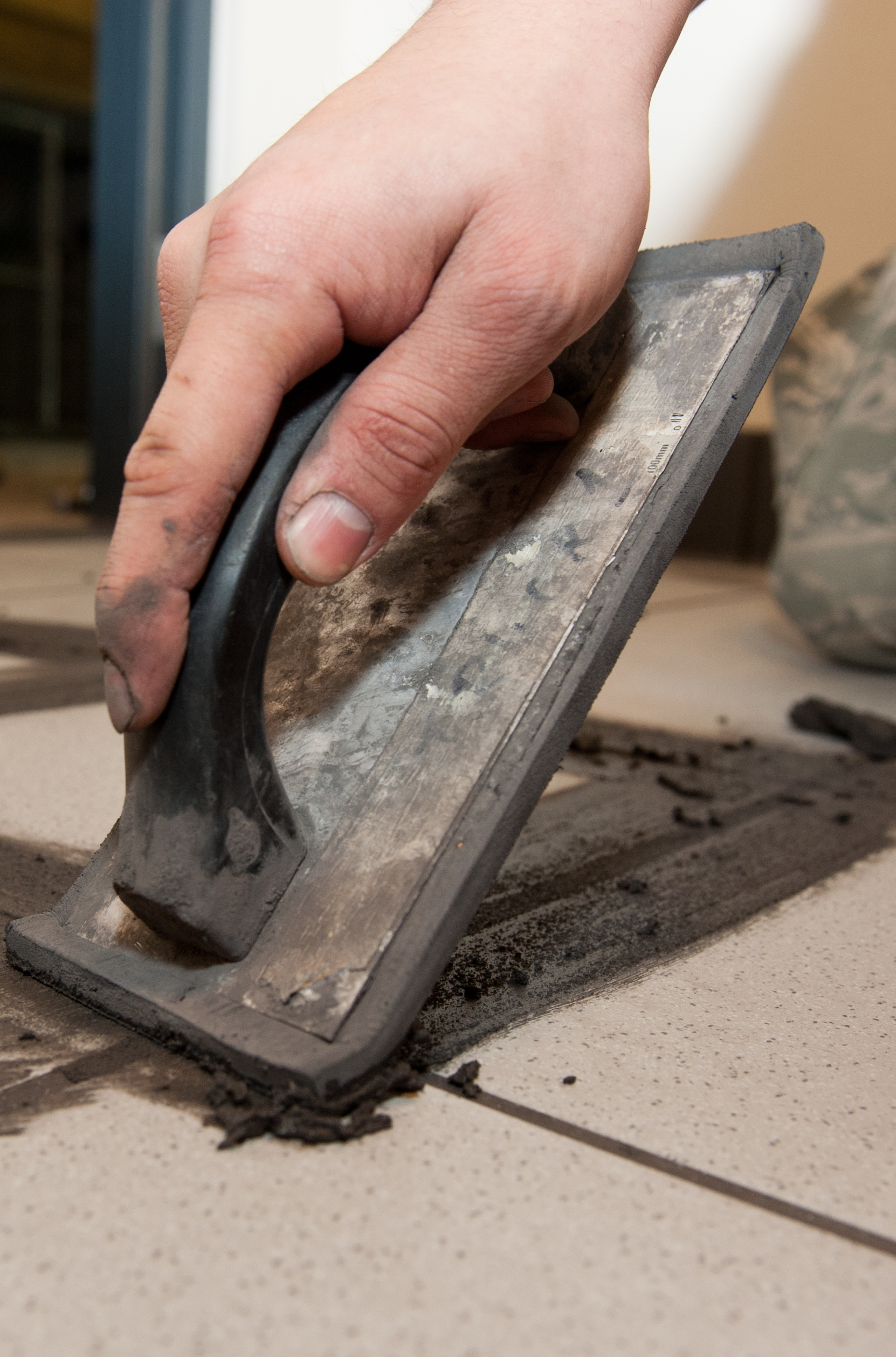
Using a rubber grout float to smooth grout between tiles

Grout is a dense substance that flows like a liquid yet hardens upon application, often used to fill gaps or to function as reinforcement in existing structures. Grout is generally a mixture of water, cement, and sand, and is frequently employed in efforts such as pressure grouting, embedding rebar in masonry walls, connecting sections of precast concrete, filling voids, and sealing joints such as those between tiles. Common uses for grout in the household include filling in tiles of shower floors and kitchen tiles. It is often color tinted when it has to be kept visible and sometimes includes fine gravel when being used to fill large spaces (such as the cores of concrete blocks). Unlike other structural pastes such as plaster or joint compound, correctly mixed and applied grout forms a water-resistant seal.

== Grout vs mortar and caulk ==
Although both grout and its close relative, mortar, are applied as a thick suspension and harden over time, grout is distinguished by its low viscosity and lack of lime (added to mortar for pliability); grout is thin so it flows readily into gaps, while mortar is thick enough to support not only its own weight, but also that of masonry placed above it. Grout is also similar to concrete, but grout is distinguished by having only very fine aggregate (sand) and by generally containing a higher ratio of water to achieve the low desired viscosity.

The materials "caulk" and "grout" are not synonymous. While each is used in building construction and maintenance, the former is usually made up of a fluid acrylic, silicone or polyurethane mixture that remains flexible after curing, while the latter consists of cementitious materials that harden upon drying.

== Cementitious tile grouts classification ==
Cementitious grout can be classified into two types: ordinary grout and improved grout. They can be further divided into three types based on their additional performance characteristics:

- F - Fast setting grout
- W - Reduced water absorption grout
- A - High Abrasion resistance grout

== Varieties ==
Grout varieties include tiling, flooring, resin, nonshrinking, structural, and thixotropic grouts. The use of enhancing admixtures increases the quality of cement-based materials and leads to greater uniformity of hardened properties.

Tiling grout is often used to fill the spaces between tiles or mosaics and to secure tile to its base. Although ungrouted mosaics do exist, most have grout between the tesserae. Tiling grout is also cement-based, and is produced in sanded and unsanded varieties, which affects the strength, size, and appearance of the grout. The sanded variety contains finely ground silica sand; unsanded is finer and produces a smoother final surface. They are often enhanced with polymers and/or latex.

Structural grout is often used in reinforced masonry to fill voids in masonry housing reinforcing steel, securing the steel in place, and bonding it to the masonry. Nonshrinking grout is used beneath metal bearing plates to ensure a consistent bearing surface between the plate and its substrate, which adds stability and allows for higher load transfers.

Portland cement is the most common cementing agent in grout. However, the utilization of thermoset polymer matrix grouts based on thermosets such as urethanes and epoxies are also popular.

Portland cement-based grouts include different varieties depending on the particle size of the ground clinker used to make the cement, with a standard size around 15 microns, microfine from 6–10 microns, and ultrafine below 5 microns. Finer particle sizes let the grout penetrate more deeply into a fissure. Because these grouts depend on the presence of sand for their basic strength, they are often somewhat gritty when finally cured and hardened.

From the different types of grout, a suitable one has to be chosen depending on the load. For example, a load up to 7.5 tons can be expected for a garage access [two-component pavement joint mortar (traffic load)], whereas a cobbled garden path is only designed for a pedestrian load [one-component pavement joint mortar (pedestrian load)]. Furthermore, various substructures determine whether the type of grout should be permanently permeable to water or waterproof, for example, by concrete subfloor.

== Tools and treatments ==
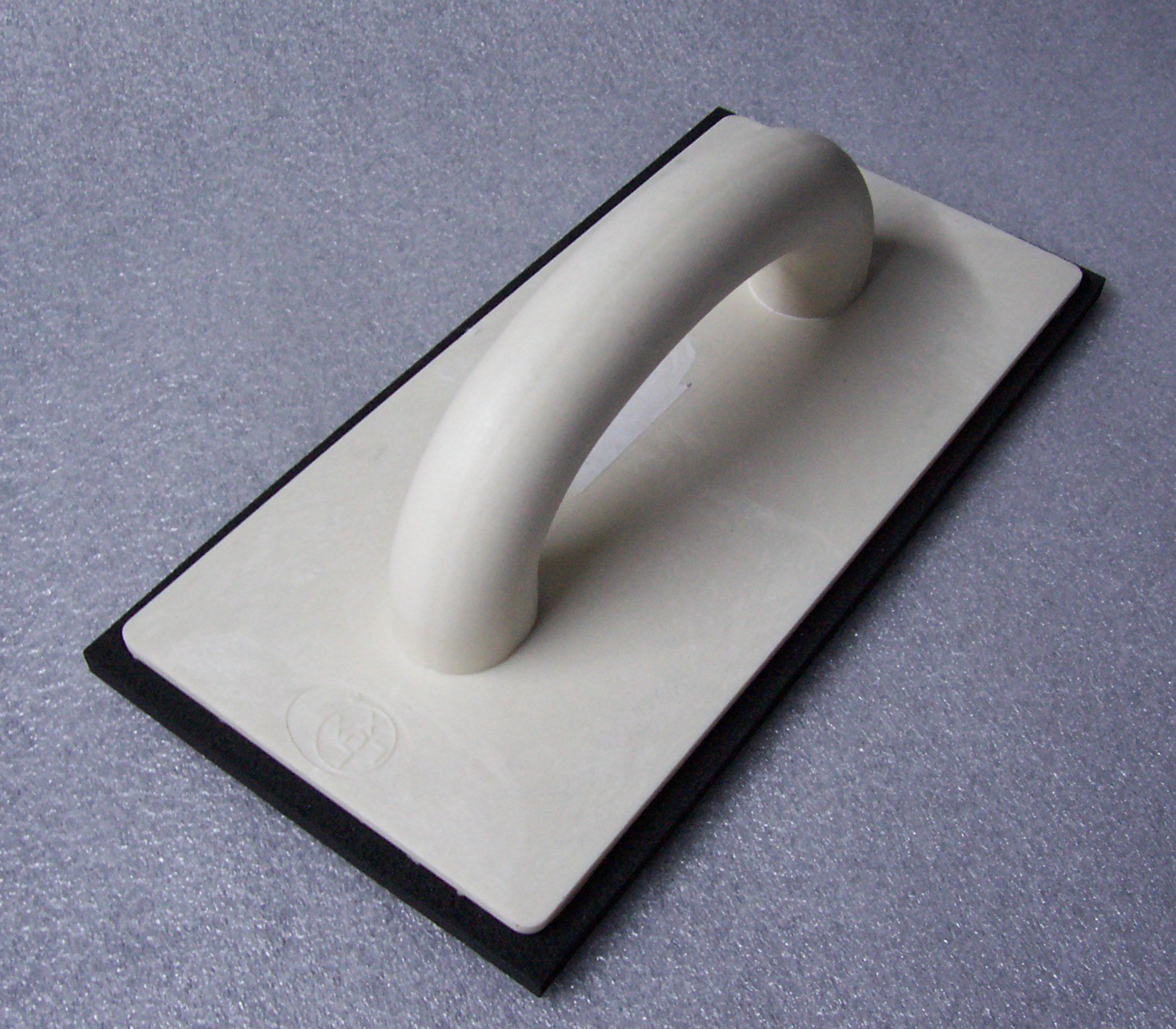
A rubber grout float

Tools associated with groutwork include:

- A grout saw or grout scraper is a manual tool for removal of old and discolored grout. The blade is usually composed of tungsten carbide.
- A grout float is a trowel-like tool for smoothing the surface of a grout line, typically made of rubber or soft plastic
- Grout sealer is a water-based or solvent-based sealant applied over dried grout that resists water, oil, and acid-based contaminants.
- Grout cleaner is a basic cleaning solution that is applied on grout lines and removes the dirt and dust.
- A die grinder is used for faster removal of old grout compared to a standard grout saw.
- A pointing trowel is used for applying grout in flagstone and other stone works.
- A multi-tool (power tool) is another option for removing tile grout between tiles when fitted with a specified diamond blade.
- A grout clean-up bucket is a professional clean-up kit for faster grout washup. It consists of a specialised bucket on rollers with a sponge.

== See also ==
- Composite material
- Glue
- Mortar in masonry
  - Mortar joint
- Thinset
