= Thick bed mortar =

Traditional method for installation of tile and stone

A traditional method for the installation of tile and stone which involves setting the tile or stone into a mortar bed which has been packed over a surface.

== History ==
The thick bed mortar method has been around for hundreds, if not thousands of years. Historically, a sand/cement mixture was mixed with water to a fairly dry consistency and was spread on either a portland cement water paste (neat cement), or over cement powder spread on the surface which is then sprayed with water to create a slurry coat and spread over the surface. The thick bed mortar would then be compacted and screeded (made flat and/or level) prior to installation of tile or stone. As the slurry coat dried it would bond the mortar bed to the concrete surface on which it was installed. Mortar beds were used underneath almost every tile or stone installation until the late 1950s when a chemical engineer, Henry M. Rothberg, invented the technology which introduced latex to sand/cement mortar mixes, and created a new industry based on thin bed adhesive installations by founding Laticrete International.

Mortars used in this technique typically have a compressive strength ranging from at least 400 psi (2.8 MPa) to 1600 psi (11 MPa), when tested using ANSI testing procedures. However, with advancements in technology and materials, the potential strengths of the thick bed mortar system have increased.

Quality controlled manufacturing processes create thick bed mortar mixes which combine carefully graded, high quality aggregates (sand) in a precise ratio with portland cement. This means that a consistent mix can be achieved without the need for a laborer to blend sand/cement and possibly lime at the jobsite. These pre-packaged mortars also eliminate the problems caused by excessively damp sand, incorrect mixing ratios, quality of the raw materials, and piles of sand on a jobsite. Today's thick bed mortars can be fortified with the inclusion of a liquid latex or redispersible polymer per the manufacturer's directions to enhance the performance properties of the thick bed mortar.

== See also ==
- Thinset mortar
- Ceramic tile
