= Thinset =

Adhesive mortar made of cement

Thinset (also called thinset mortar, thinset cement, dryset mortar, or drybond mortar) is an adhesive mortar made of cement, fine sand and a water-retaining agent such as an alkyl derivative of cellulose. It is usually used to attach tile or stone to surfaces such as cement or concrete. The adoption of a thinset mortar based installation method has led to an expansion in the usage of ceramic tiles throughout the latter half of the 20th century. Further, It is particularly popular among mosaicists for outdoor applications.

Thinset is generally available in two types: unmodified and modified (polymer-modified). Modified thinset has been developed to enhance the strength of the bond in addition to improving working conditions of the material (i.e. working time, working temperature range, etc.). It is usually more expensive than standard, unmodified thinset.

== History ==
The history of thinset dates back to the post-World War II era when the tile industry sought more efficient methods for tile installation. Before thinset, the standard method for installing tiles was the thick-set or mud-set method, which involved a thick layer of a sand and cement mixture.

The development of thinset revolutionized tile installation. It allowed for a much thinner layer of mortar, which not only reduced material costs and labor but also allowed for more precise and flatter tile installations. The adhesive properties of thinset are enhanced by adding polymers to the mixture, which also increases its flexibility and strength. This advancement made it possible to install tile over a variety of surfaces, including concrete, plywood, and backer board, as well as in areas with more environmental exposure, like bathrooms and kitchens.

== See also ==
- Thick bed mortar
- Ceramic tile
