= Eagle Harbor =

Eagle Harbor may refer to several places in the United States:

- Eagle Harbor, a development on Fleming Island, Florida
- Eagle Harbor, Maryland, a town
- Eagle Harbor, Michigan, an unincorporated community and census-designated place
  - Eagle Harbor Coast Guard Station Boathouse, a historic building
  - Eagle Harbor Light, a lighthouse
  - Eagle Harbor Schoolhouse, a historic building
- Eagle Harbor Township, Michigan
- Eagle Harbor, New York, a hamlet
- Eagle Harbor (Washington), an inlet in Bainbridge Island
  - Eagle Harbor High School
- Eagle Harbor (Wisconsin), a small harbor in Door County
