= M-26–Cedar Creek Culvert =

- U.S. National Register of Historic Places
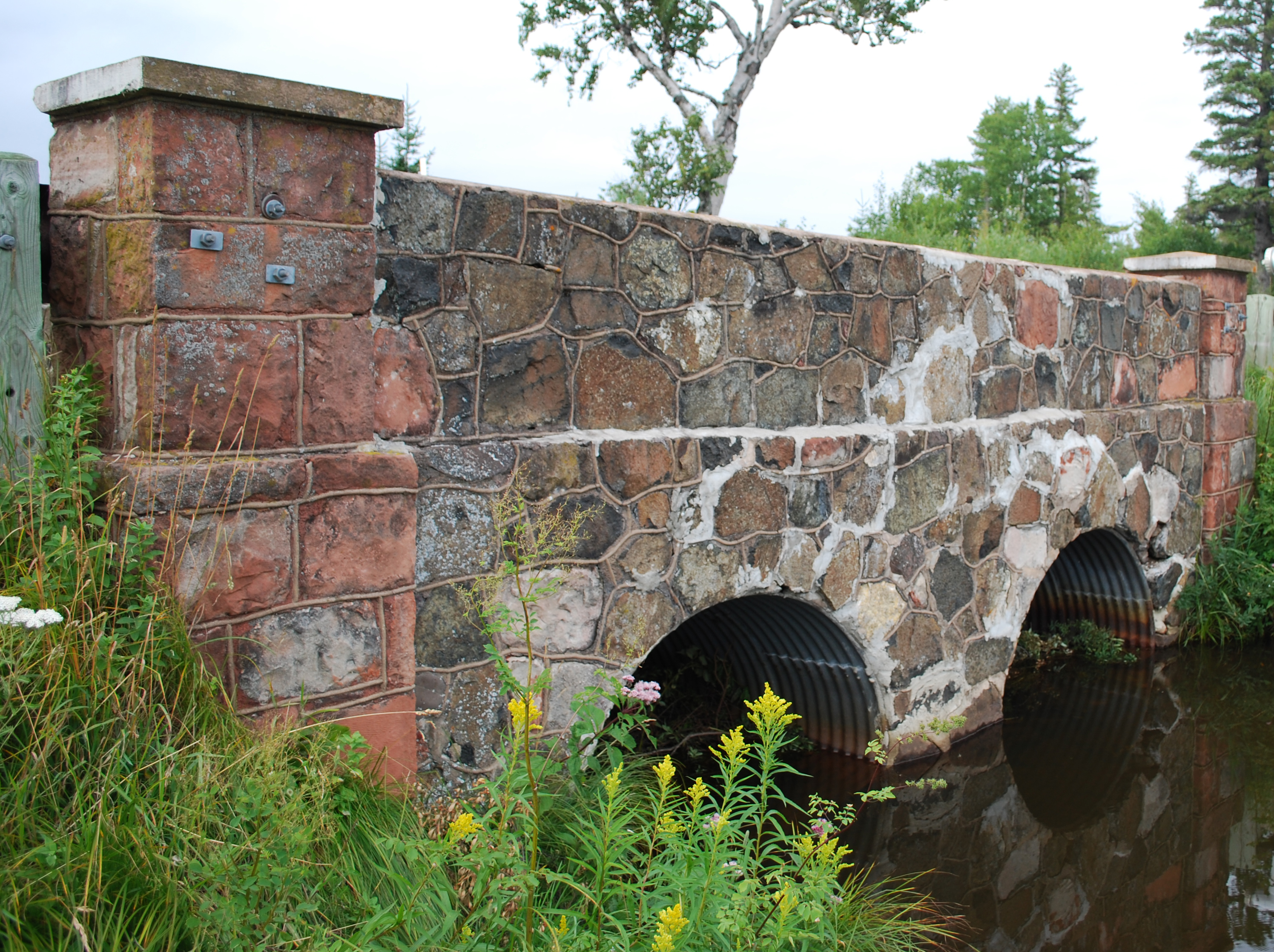

- Location within Michigan Location within the United States
- Interactive map
- Location: M-26 over Cedar Creek, Eagle Harbor Township, Michigan
- Coordinates: 47°27′20″N 88°9′0″W
- Built: 1930
- Architect: Keweenaw County Road Commission
- Architectural style: multiplate steel culvert
- MPS: Highway Bridges of Michigan MPS
- NRHP reference No.: 99001526
- Added to NRHP: December 17, 1999

The M-26–Cedar Creek Culvert is a short highway bridge located on M-26 over Cedar Creek in Eagle Harbor Township, Michigan. The Keweenaw County Road Commission built the bridge in 1930; they also built the M-26–Silver River Culvert and the US 41–Fanny Hooe Creek Bridge around the same time. The M-26–Cedar Creek Culvert was listed on the National Register of Historic Places in 1999.

== Description ==
The M-26–Cedar Creek Culvert spans the mouth of Cedar Creek, immediately south of Lake Superior. The bridge is configured as a two-barrel, multi-plate steel culvert. Each of the arches are ringed with irregular stone voussoir veneers. The endwalls and parapet walls contain decorative fieldstones with grapevine mortar joints. The parapets are banded on both sides by heavy stone bulkheads having pyramidally shaped concrete caps. The bulkheads extend below the level of the road, and continue as pilasters along the sidewalls. The Cedar Creek Culvert is unaltered and in excellent condition.
