= Justus H. Rathbone =

American activist (1839–1889)

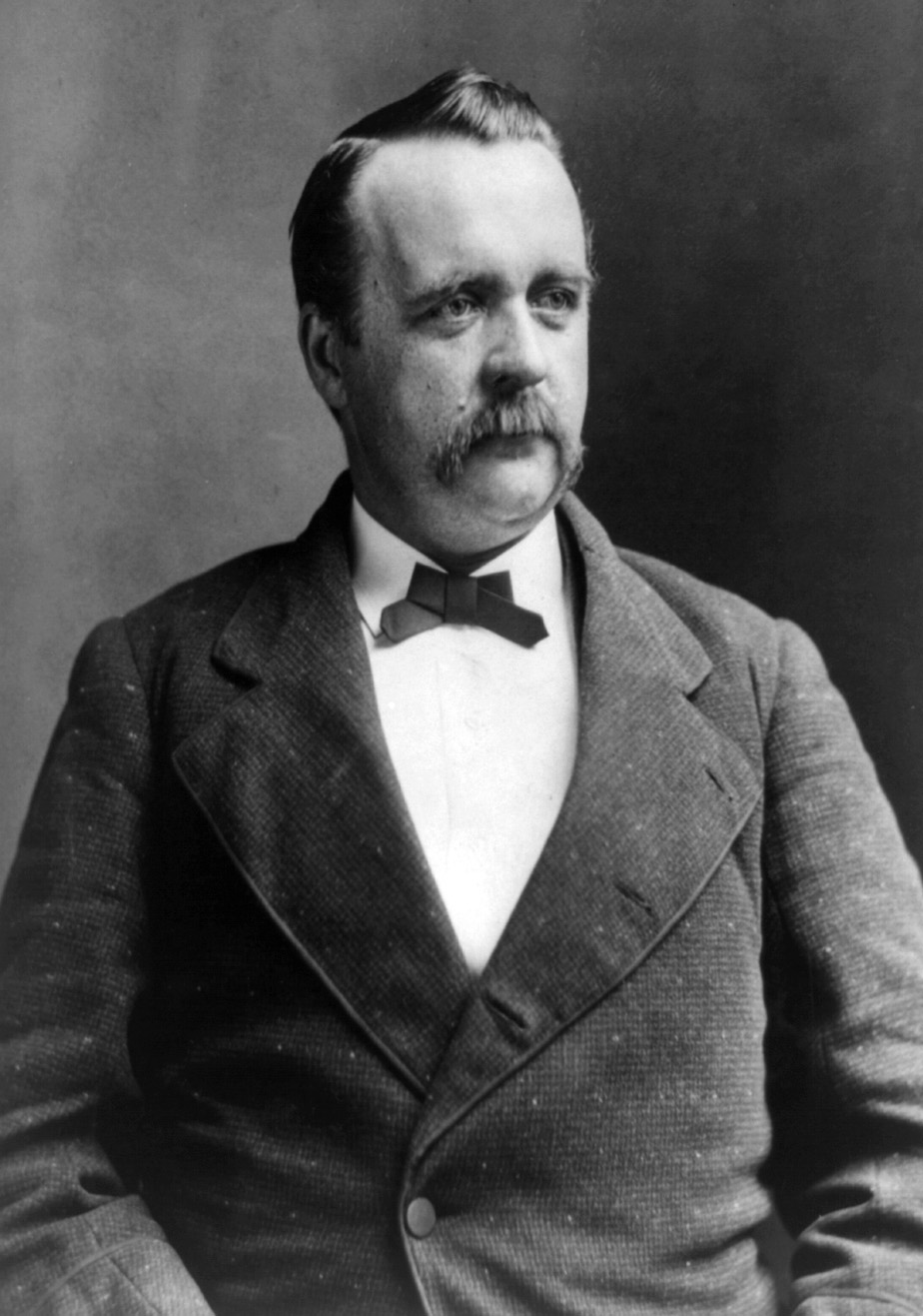
- Rathbone c. 1890
- Born: Justus Henry Rathbone; October 29, 1839; Deerfield, New York, U.S.
- Died: December 9, 1889 (aged 50); Lima, Ohio, U.S.
- Resting place: Forest Hill Cemetery; Utica, New York, U.S.
- Education: Colgate University; Carlisle Seminary
- Known for: Founder of the Knights of Pythias
- Spouse: Emma Louisa Sanger (m. 1862; died 1887)
- Children: 5

Justus Henry Rathbone (October 29, 1839 – December 9, 1889) was an American school teacher and the founder of the international fraternal order of the Knights of Pythias. Prior to and during the American Civil War he taught, worked in a number of places for the government, and with news agencies, and also served as a hospital steward during the war.

== Family and early life ==
Rathbone was born in the town of Deerfield, in Oneida County, New York on October 29, 1839. He was descended from John Rathbone, one of the purchasers of Block Island near the coast of Rhode Island in 1660, who was a freeman of Rhode Island in 1664. He was the son of Justus Hull Rathbone, a Utica, New York lawyer, and his wife, Sarah Elizabeth ( née Dwight). Rathbone was given the name of Henry Edwin Dwight, but at the age of ten it was changed to Justus Henry. Rathbone graduated from Colgate University and attended Carlisle Seminary. He was a music composer and actor. He received an education in academies in New York State and for a short time Madison University (later renamed Colgate University), he went west at the age of nineteen. During the winter of 1858–1859, he worked as a teacher at the Eagle Harbor Schoolhouse in Eagle Harbor, Michigan. On August 11, 1862, Rathbone married Emma Louisa Sanger of Utica, New York and together they had five children, of whom only two daughters lived to adulthood.

== Career ==
In 1863 he moved to Washington D.C. as a government clerk in the United States Treasury Department, where he founded the Knights of Pythias on February 19, 1864. Rathbone authored the ritual for the Knights, which is based on the mythological friendship of Damon and Pythias, when he was still a teacher in Eagle Harbor. The cardinal precepts of the fraternal order were, "Toleration in religion, obedience to law, and loyalty to government." Even though the Knights of Pythias was originally founded as an order composed of government clerks, any involvement with government and politics was not to be "permitted within its portals."

From January to July 1863, he served in the Federal hospital service as a volunteer citizen nurse, stationed at Cuyler General Hospital, Germantown, Pennsylvania From July 1863 until nearly the end of the Civil War he served as a hospital steward in Washington, D. C. The chief steward of the hospital, Robert Allen Champion, endorsed Rathbone's ideas for the Knights of Pythias and advised that when an appropriate opportunity allowed, an attempt be made to establish the new fraternal order. Rathbone and Champion were soon transferred to Washington and, along with three other government clerks, they organized Washington Lodge, No. 1, on February 19, 1864, the mother lodge of the Order of Knights of Pythias. By the end of 1864, Rathbone was elected "worthy chancellor" of the Washington Lodge which had increased in membership to fifty-two members. However, he was not honored with the fraternal rank of Grand Chancellor in Washington's Grand Lodge, which was also founded during the same year. Rathbone was employed as a clerk in the Treasury Department, from 1865 to 1869. He then went to work for the Independent News Company of Boston and New York, from 1869 to 1873, and then served as a clerk in the War Department from 1874 until his death.

== Final years and legacy ==
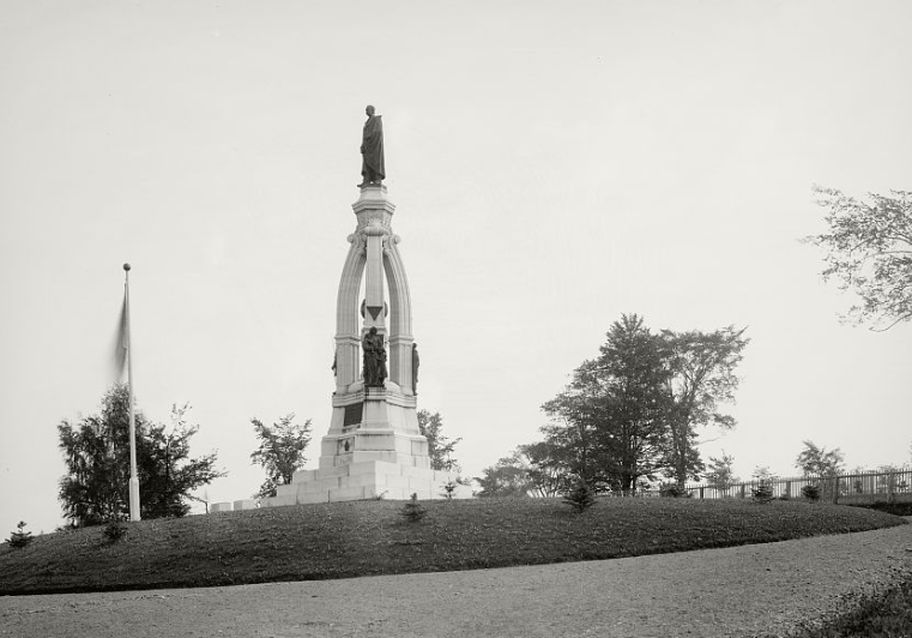
Knights of Pythias monument to Rathbone

Two years after his wife died in 1887 Rathbone died at the age of 50 on December 9, 1889, in Lima, Ohio, and was officially honored as the founder of the Knights of Pythias, that same year. Rathbone is buried at New Forest Cemetery in Utica, New York. In 1892 a large monument with a statue of his likeness was erected in his honor as founder of the Knights of Pythias and marks his grave site.

== Sources ==
- Malone, Dumas, ed. (1943). Dictionary of American biography. Vol. XV. New York: Charles Scribner's Sons. pp. 385–386.
- Pythian History by William D. Kennedy, Chicago, Pythian Publishing Company, 1904.
- "Eagle Harbor Schoolhouse". MI State Historic Preservation Objects. Michigan Economic Development Corporation. May 17, 2012. Archived from the original on May 17, 2012.
