= M-26–Silver River Culvert =

- U.S. National Register of Historic Places
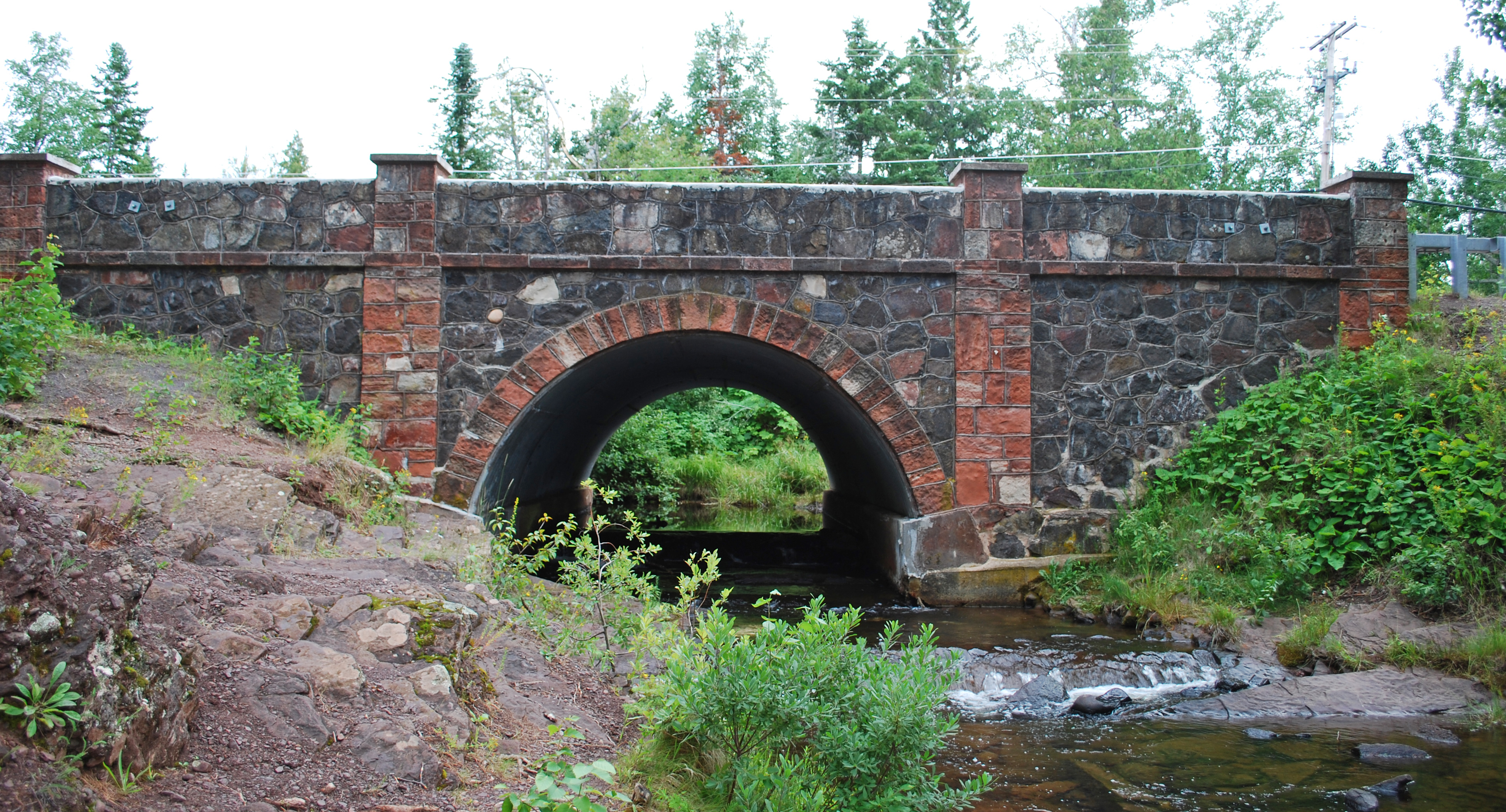

- Location within Michigan Location within the United States
- Interactive map
- Location: M-26 over Silver River, Eagle Harbor Township, Michigan
- Coordinates: 47°27′47″N 88°4′20″W
- Built: 1930
- Architect: Keweenaw County Road Commission
- Architectural style: multiplate steel culvert
- MPS: Highway Bridges of Michigan MPS
- NRHP reference No.: 99001527
- Added to NRHP: December 17, 1999

The M-26–Silver River Culvert is a highway bridge located on M-26 over the Silver River in Eagle Harbor Township, Michigan. The Keweenaw County Road Commission built the bridge in 1930; they also built the US 41–Fanny Hooe Creek Bridge and the M-26–Cedar Creek Culvert around the same time. The M-26–Silver River Culvert was listed on the National Register of Historic Places in 1999.

The Michigan Department of Transportation removed the structure in late April 2023 and replaced it with a modern concrete beam bridge in a $2.9 million project. The newly reconstructed was opened at the end of June 2023.
