= US 41–Fanny Hooe Creek Bridge =

- U.S. National Register of Historic Places
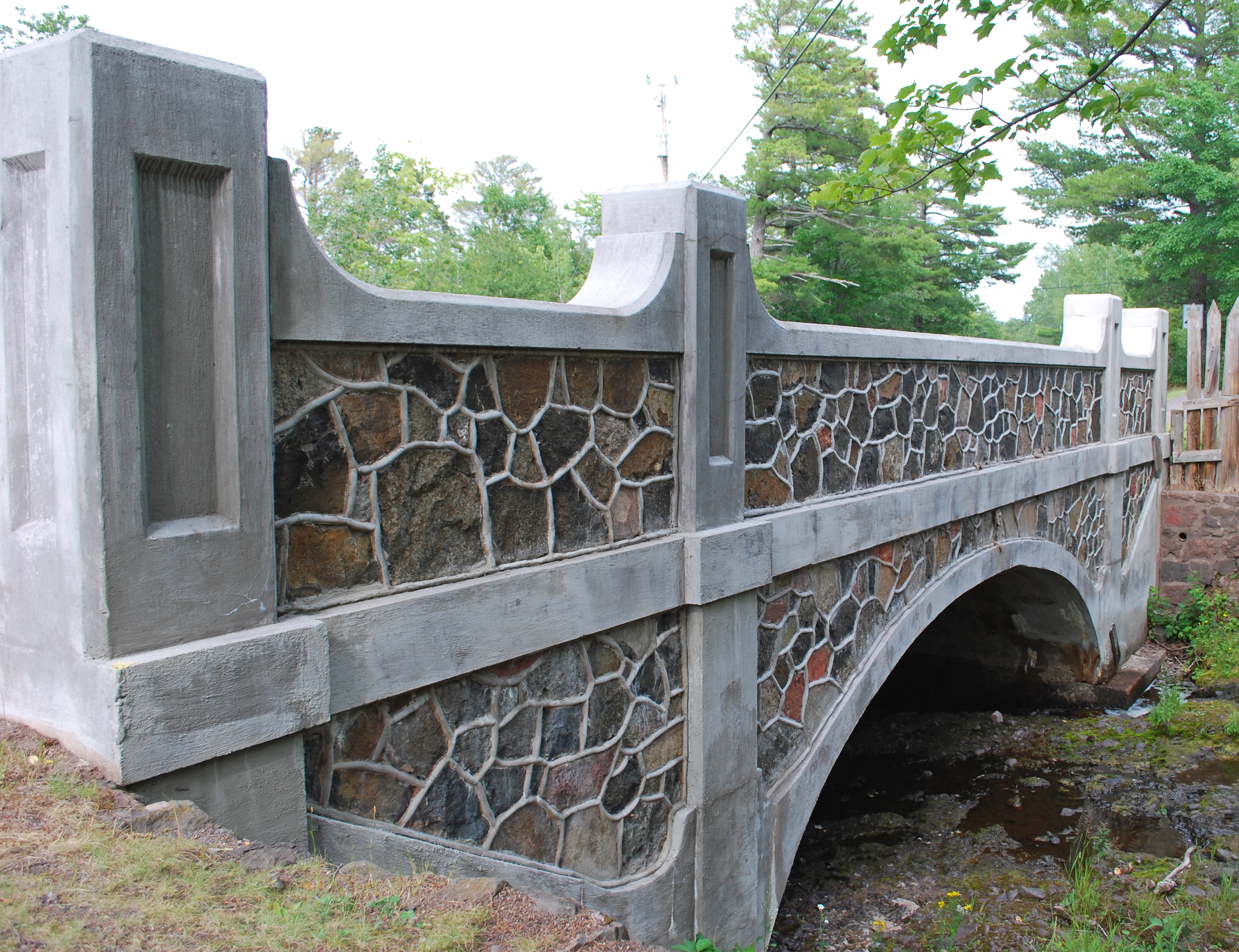

- Location within Michigan Location within the United States
- Interactive map
- Location: US 41 over Fanny Hooe Creek, Grant Township, Michigan
- Coordinates: 47°28′1″N 87°52′18″W
- Built: 1928
- Architect: Keweenaw County Road Commission; Michigan State Highway Dept.
- Architectural style: Spandrel arch bridge
- MPS: Highway Bridges of Michigan MPS
- NRHP reference No.: 99001525
- Added to NRHP: December 17, 1999

The US 41–Fanny Hooe Creek Bridge is a highway bridge located on US Highway 41 (US 41) over the Fanny Hooe Creek about one mile east of Copper Harbor, adjacent to Fort Wilkins State Park, in Grant Township, Michigan. It was listed on the National Register of Historic Places in 1999.

== History ==
In 1913, the state of Michigan passed the State Trunk Line Act, which in part provided for the construction of a state route through Keweenaw, Houghton, Ontonagon and Gogebic counties. Portions of this 1913 route were later included in US 41 and US 45. In the 1920s, parts of the trunkline were improved by regrading and the building of new bridges. One such bridge was constructed by the Keweenaw County Road Commission, just east of Copper Harbor near the northern terminus of the trunkline. (The Keweenaw County Road Commission also built the M-26–Silver River Culvert and the M-26–Cedar Creek Culvert around the same time.) The original cost of the bridge was $8,132.02.

== Description ==
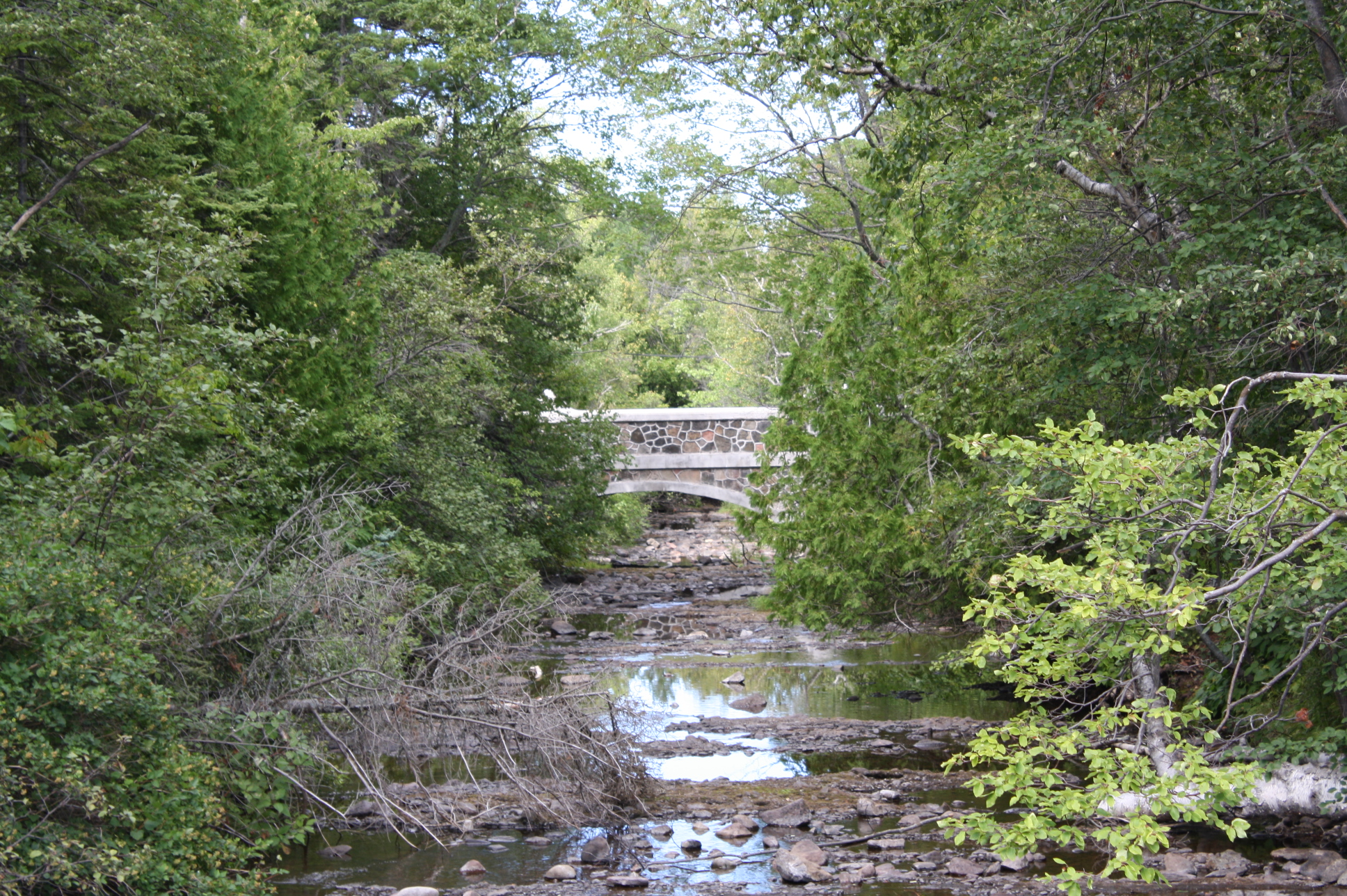
Side view down Fanny Hooe Creek

The bridge spanning the Fanny Hooe Creek is a small concrete arch bridge (spanning 25 feet) with an elliptically shaped continuous arch ring and filled spandrels. It sits on a concrete foundation. The endwalls and parapet walls of the bridge have decoratively placed fieldstone work with grapevine mortar joints. Each parapet has four paneled concrete bulkheads which merge into pilasters along the sidewalls below grade level. The bridge is particularly significant because of its decorative stonework (unusual for Michigan bridges) and the degree of craftsmanship in its construction. George Tramp, an engineer with the Michigan State Highway Department in the 1920s, commented that, "after one sees the masonry work on this bridge they will agree that the art work of the stone mason has not been entirely lost."

== See also ==
- List of bridges on the National Register of Historic Places in Michigan
- National Register of Historic Places listings in Keweenaw County, Michigan
