= Eagle Harbor Coast Guard Station Boathouse =

- U.S. National Register of Historic Places
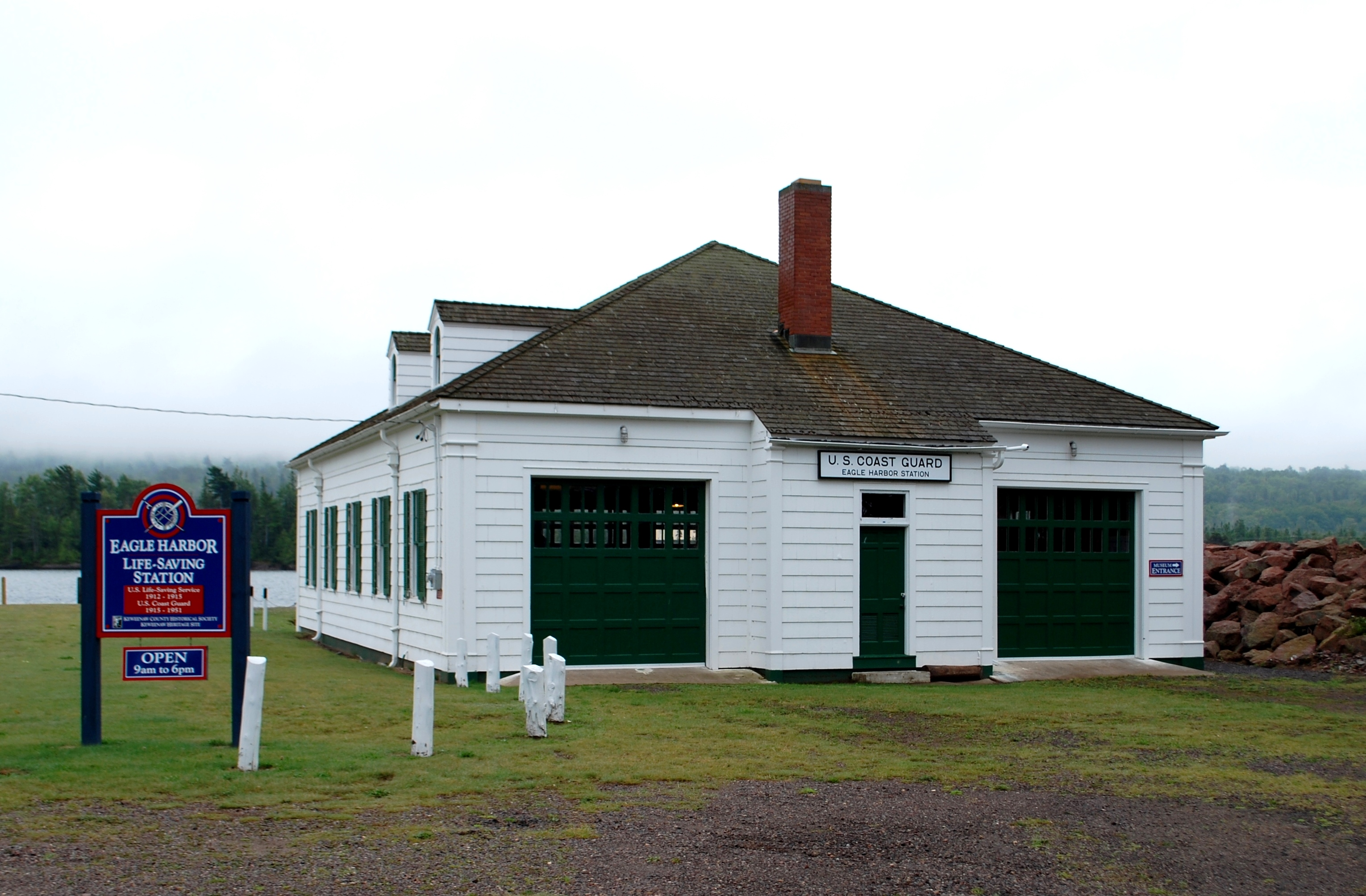

- Location within Michigan Location within the United States
- Interactive map
- Location: 9282 Marina Rd., Eagle Harbor, Michigan
- Coordinates: 47°27′32″N 88°8′58″W
- Area: 1 acre (0.40 ha)
- Built: 1938
- Architectural style: Late Victorian
- NRHP reference No.: 12000306
- Added to NRHP: August 16, 2012

The Eagle Harbor Coast Guard Station Boathouse is a boathouse located at 9282 Marina Road in Eagle Harbor, Michigan. It was listed on the National Register of Historic Places in 2012.

== History ==
The Life-Saving Station at Eagle Harbor was constructed in the period 1910-1912 by the United States Life-Saving Service. The original station complex included the station building with a hip-roof watch tower at the corner and a two-bay boathouse that probably was located where the present structure is. Other buildings and structures have been added to the complex over the years. In 1915, the Life-Saving Service was combined with the United States Revenue Cutter Service to create the United States Coast Guard, and the name of the Eagle Harbor Life-Saving Station was changed to the Eagle Harbor Coast Guard Station. In 1938 the original boathouse was replaced with the current structure. The station remained in service until 1950. In 1954, the station was turned over to the General Services Administration as surplus. Several structures were moved across Eagle Harbor to the grounds of the Eagle Harbor Light. The 1938 boathouse is the only original structure remaining on site.

The Eagle Harbor Coast Guard Station Boathouse is currently operated by the Keweenaw County Historical Society as the Eagle Harbor Life-Saving Station.

== Description ==
The Eagle Harbor Coast Guard Station Boathouse is a rectangular, one-story structure on a poured concrete foundation measuring 58 feet by 44 feet. The building has a hip roof clad in what may be original cedar shingles, and walls covered with wide exposure wood weatherboard siding. The building has three boat bays facing what was once a nearby former boat slip. There is a chimney on one side and small gabled dormers with round-head double-hung colonial windows in the roof on all the other elevations. There are five roll-up panel doors, two on the north elevation and three on the south elevation, and double-hung six-over-six windows with wooden shutters.

The interior of the building contains one large open space, with concrete flooring gently sloping toward one end. The Keweenaw County Historical Society has filled the interior with displays of Life-Saving Service and Coast Guard artifacts, including rescue boats and equipment of the types used at this station.

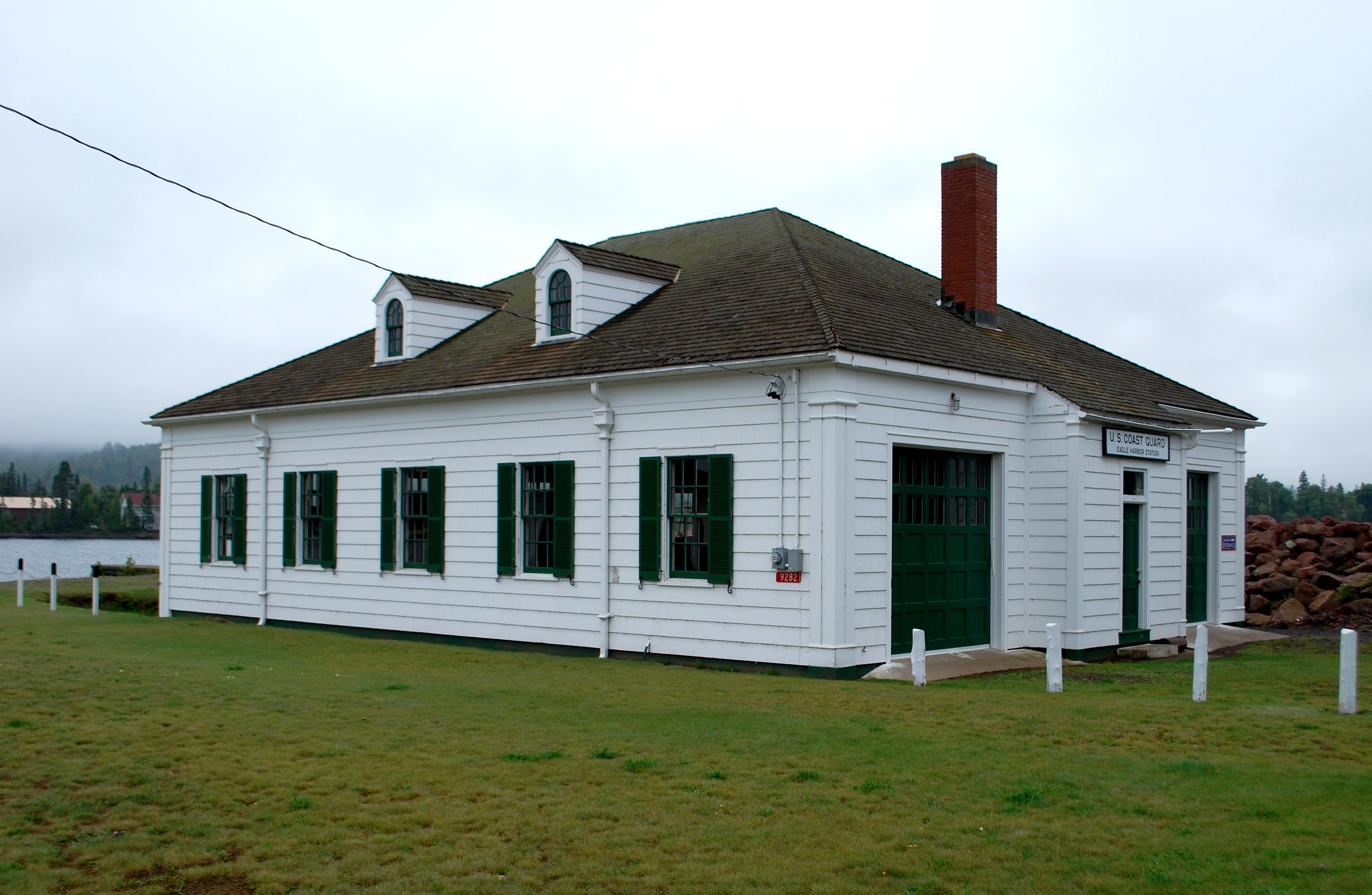
Side elevation

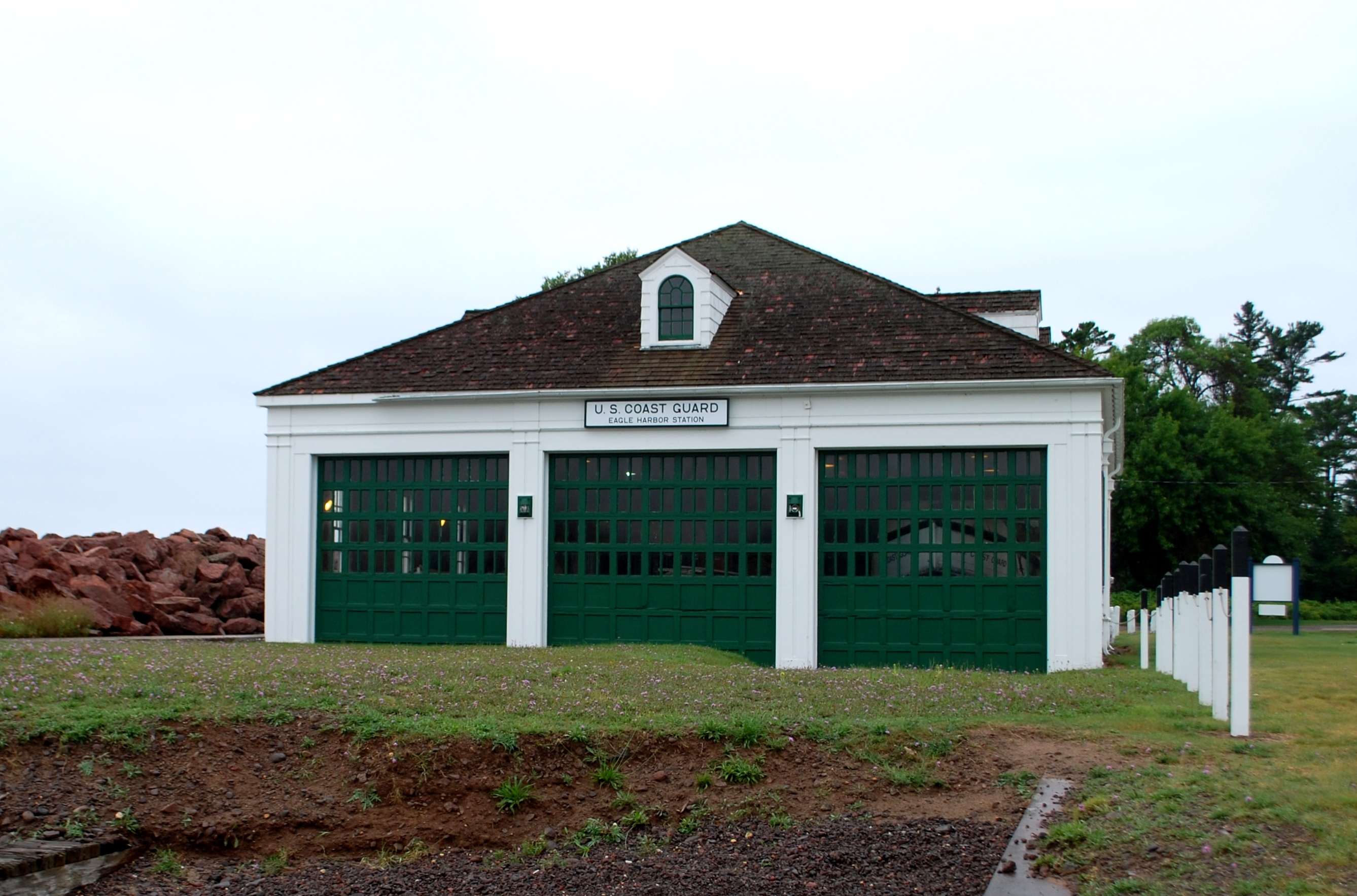
Water side

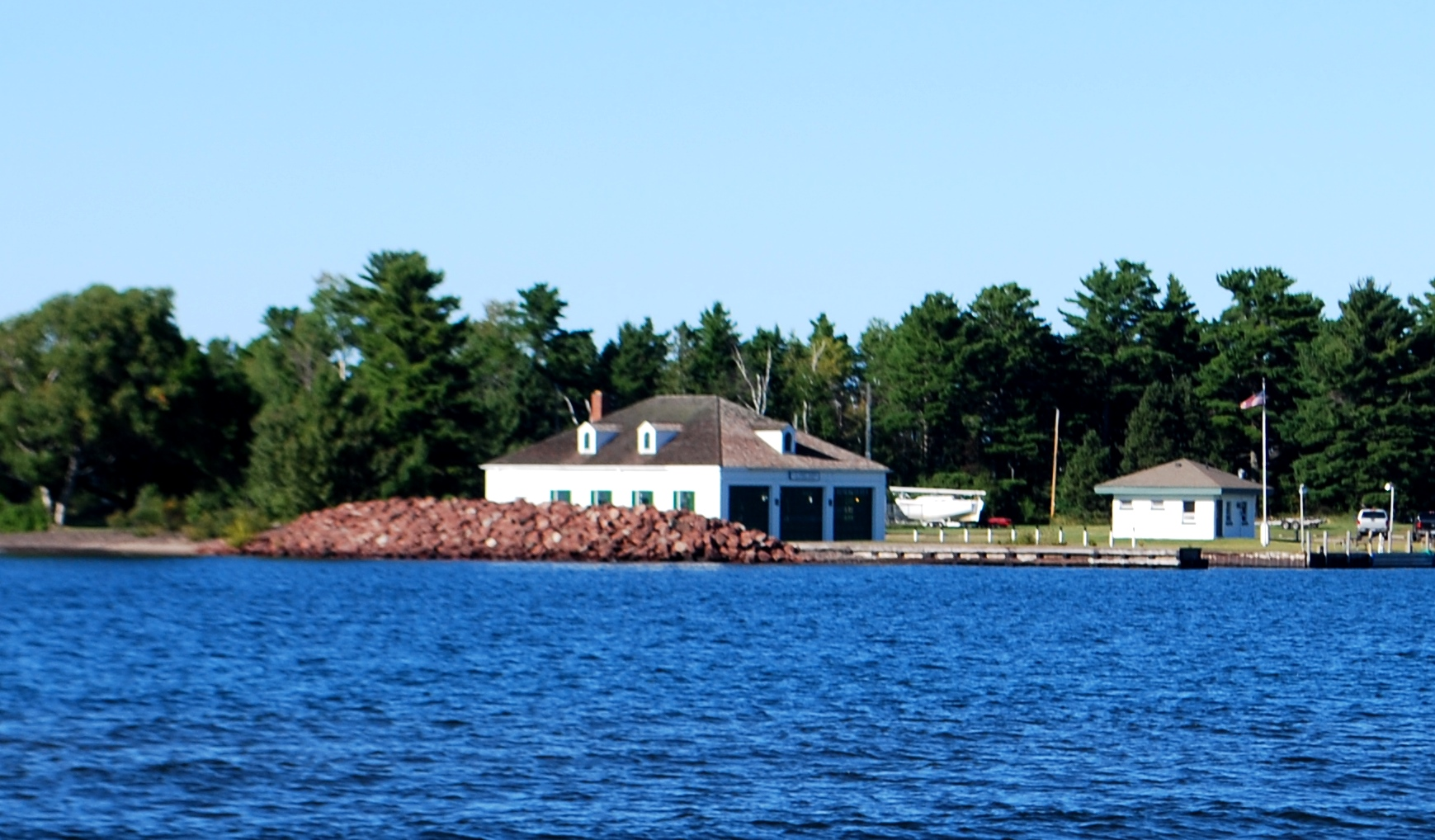
Site in harbor
