= Tuckpointing =

Method of pointing brickwork

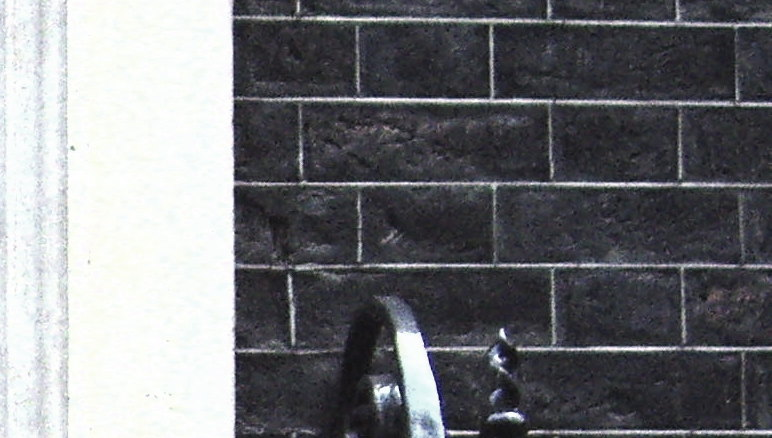
Brickwork of 10 Downing Street, showing fine white fillets in carefully matched dark mortar

Tuckpointing is a way of using two contrasting colours of mortar in the mortar joints of brickwork, with one colour matching the bricks themselves to give an artificial impression that very fine joints have been made. In some parts of the United States and Canada, some confusion may result as the term is often used interchangeably with pointing (to correct defects or finish off joints in newly laid masonry) and repointing (to place wet mortar into cut or raked joints to repair weathered joints in old masonry).

== History ==
The tuckpointing method was developed in England in the late eighteenth century to imitate brickwork constructed using rubbed bricks (also rubbers and gauged bricks), which were bricks of fine, red finish that were made slightly oversized, and after firing, were individually abraded or cut, often by hand, to a precise size. When laid with white lime mortar, a neat finish of red brick contrasting with very fine white joints was obtained. Tuckpointing was a way of achieving a similar effect using cheap, unrubbed bricks; these were laid in a mortar of a matching colour (initially red, but later, blue-black bricks and mortar were occasionally used) and a fine fillet of white material, usually pipe clay or putty, pushed into the joints before the mortar set. The term tuckpointing derives from an earlier, less sophisticated technique that was used with very uneven bricks: a thin line, called a tuck, was drawn in the flush-faced mortar, but left unfilled, to give the impression of well-formed brickwork. "Wigging", an Irish technique similar in effect, reverses the order: the white ribbons are applied first, and the surrounding mortar filled or colored to match.

== Tuckpointing tools ==
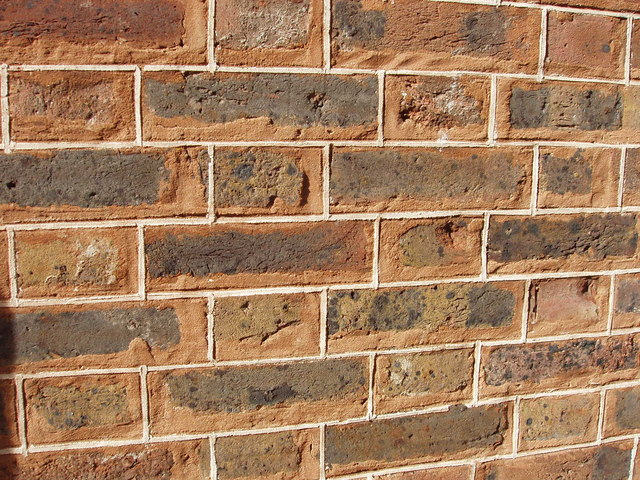
Here red mortar is used. The white fillets are laid out at regular spacing, which does not always coincide with the rough spacing of the joints.

Professional tuckpointers use tools, which, depending on the country and local trade terminology, are sometimes termed "jointers", "tuck irons" or "tuckpointing irons"; primarily in London where the trade originated.

Tuckpointing tools were originally made from wrought iron by blacksmiths in England during the 18th century. Modern tuckpointing tools are constructed from hardened tool steel, and typically have a wooden or synthetic handle that is attached to the tool surface by a metal ferrule. The tool surface has a sharply pointed front and a flat, beaded or grooved base; the sharp point aids the user in smoothing the tuckpointed line. This is similar in principle to the pointed floats used by concrete finishers to smooth out a surface.

The thickness and width of a tuckpointing tool common ranges from 1 millimetre (0.039 in) to 14 millimetres (0.55 in). The thickness and width of these tools are dependent upon the mason's preference and the type of brick or stonework they are tuckpointing. Wider tools are often used when tuckpointing stonework.

There are many types of tuckpointing tools. Standard and flat-bottomed tools were once the most-commonly used tuckpointing tools, primarily because they could be easily manufactured by early blacksmiths. Standard tuckpointing tools are versatile and can be used for a variety of jobs.

Tuckpointing tools are sometimes "beaded"; these tools were crude instruments made by blacksmiths by hitting a rounded leading-edged hammer against a red-hot tuckpointing iron. This process has since been refined and now a small fillet is ground into the flat of the tuckpointing tool that comes into contact with the perps (gaps between the bricks in which mortar runs vertically perpendicular to the ends) or gaps in the brickwork. "Lines" run in the horizontal direction.

The lengths of tools varies based upon personal preferences, but the most common lengths are between 7.5 centimetres (3.0 in) and 12.5 centimetres (4.9 in). Masons and bricklayers sometimes need shorter or longer tuckpointing tools. Shorter tools help the worker access hard-to-reach spots; these tools are referred to as "stubnose" tools, while their longer counterparts are known as "longnose" tools. They are available in many beaded or grooved profiles.

Rounded corner tuckpointing tools are curved; instead of a flat bottom, the tool has a curved bottom surface that helps in applying lime putty to rounded bricks. The process of tuckpointing requires that the excess lime putty is cut away from the fine tuckpointed line. This is performed using a Frenchmen knife, a type of knife with a small, sharp, bent tip that allows the lime putty to be cut when guided along the tuckpointed line with a tuckpointer's straight edge. A double Frenchmen knife works by cutting both top and bottom tuckpointed fine lines in one pass, making the process quicker. Double Frenchmen knives can be adjusted to match the width of the fine tuckpointed lines.

Many historic homes with classic Italianate architecture are examples of recent tuckpointing, such as Werribee Park Mansion at Werribee Park in Victoria, Australia, which displays the contrast between the tuckpointed white lines in the mortar between its bluestone architecture.
