= Eagle Harbor Township, Michigan =

- Civil township
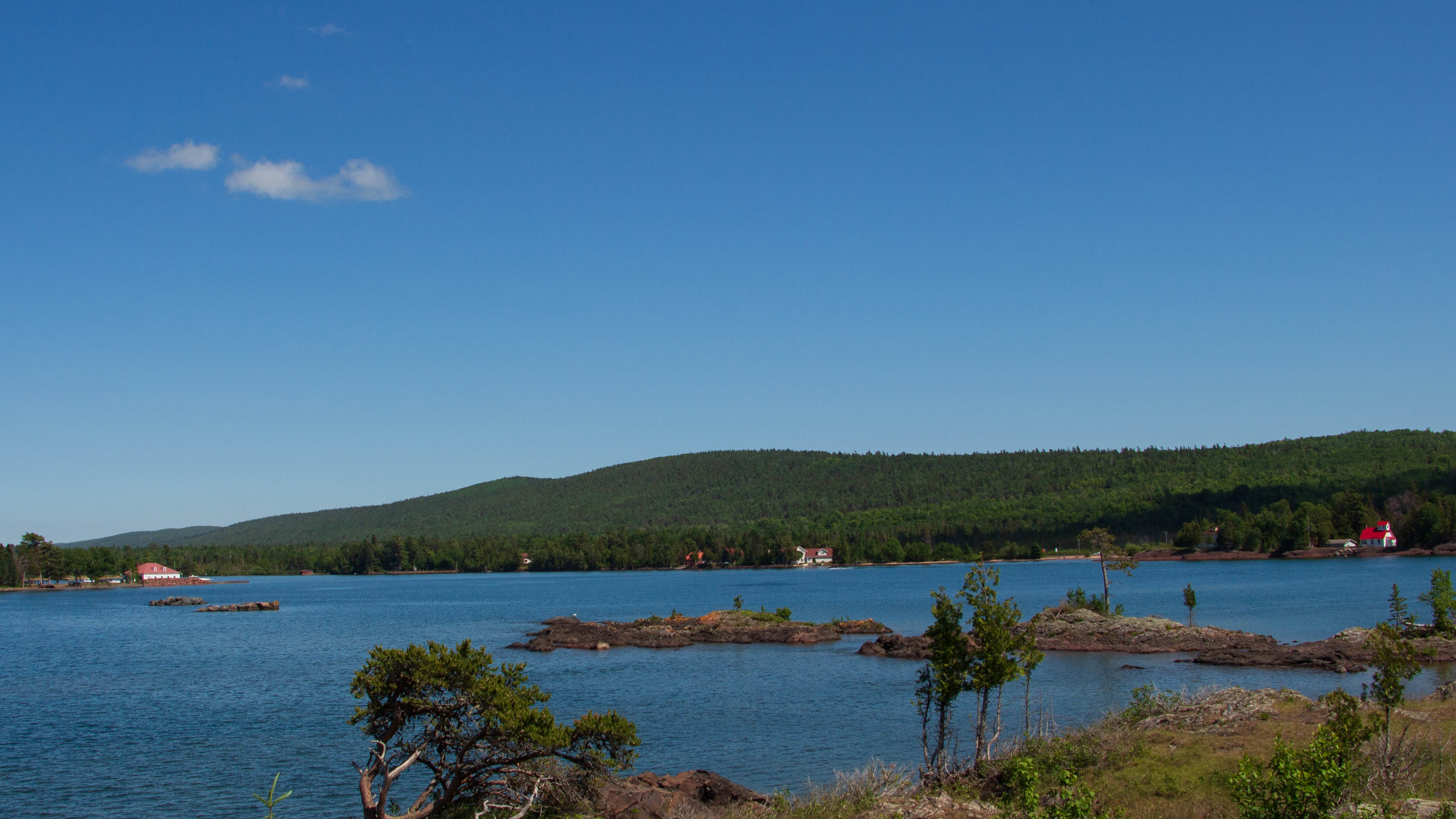
- View of Eagle Harbor along Lake Superior

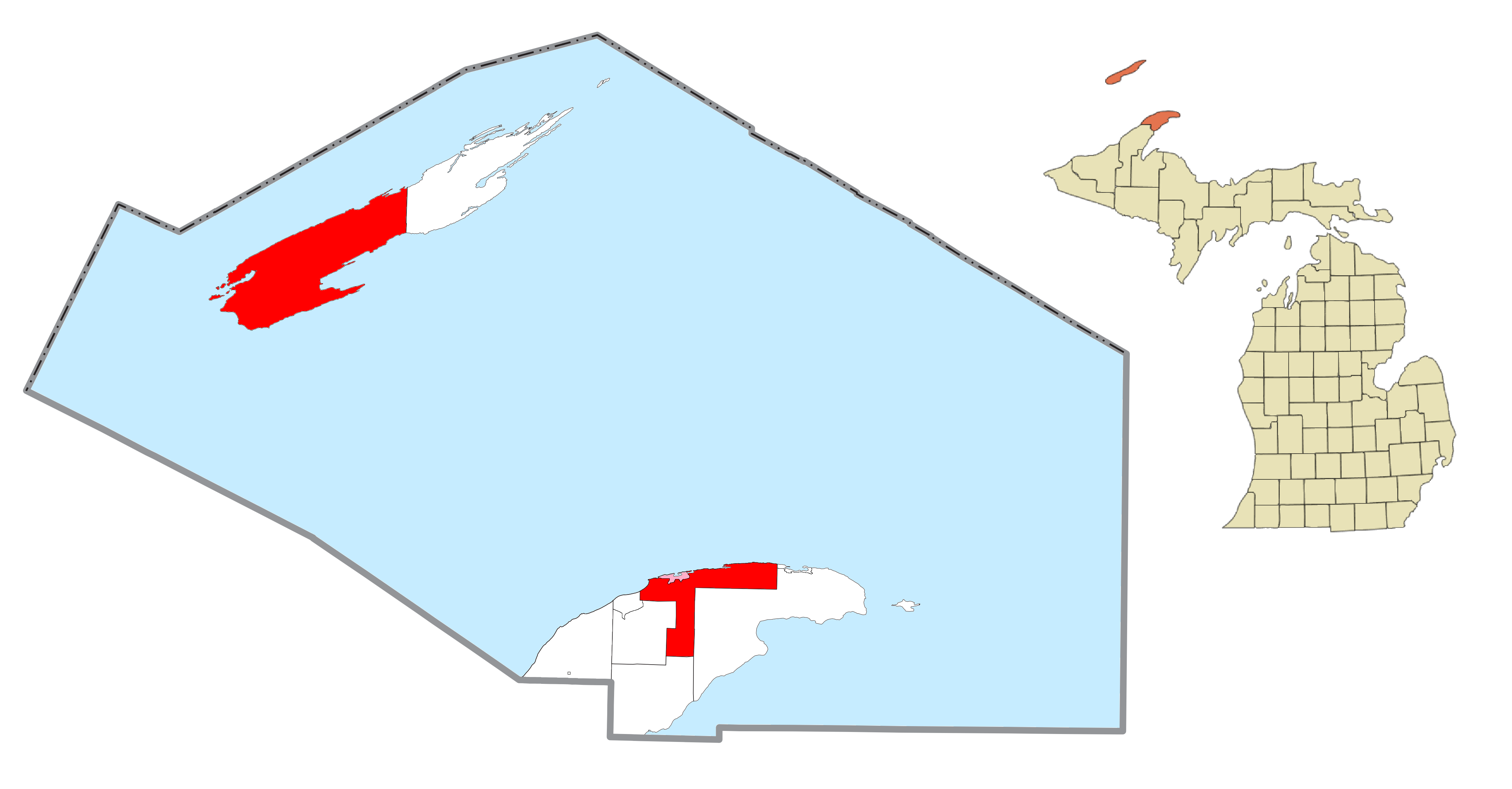
- Location within Keweenaw County (red) and the administered CDP of Eagle Harbor (pink)

- Location within the state of Michigan Location within the United States
- Coordinates: 47°24′51″N 88°17′23″W
- Country: United States
- State: Michigan
- County: Keweenaw
- Established: 1861

Government
  - Supervisor: Richard Probst
  - Clerk: Jeane Olson

Area
  - Total: 543.01 sq mi (1,406.39 km^{2})
  - Land: 180.41 sq mi (467.26 km^{2})
  - Water: 362.60 sq mi (939.13 km^{2})
- Elevation: 600 ft (183 m)

Population (2020)
  - Total: 217
  - Density: 1.71/sq mi (0.66/km^{2})
- Time zone: UTC-5 (Eastern (EST))
  - Summer (DST): UTC-4 (EDT)
- ZIP code(s): 49931 (Houghton) (Note: The Houghton 49931 ZIP Code is used exclusively for post office box services to Isle Royale National Park.); 49950 (Mohawk)
- Area code: 906
- FIPS code: 26-23620
- GNIS feature ID: 1626201
- Website: Official website

Eagle Harbor Township is a civil township of Keweenaw County in the U.S. state of Michigan. The population was 217 at the 2020 census. The township is located on the Keweenaw Peninsula and also includes the southwestern portion of Isle Royale National Park.

== Geography ==
According to the U.S. Census Bureau, the township has a total area of 543.01 square miles (1,406.39 km^{2}), of which 180.41 square miles (467.26 km^{2}) is land and 362.60 square miles (939.13 km^{2}) (66.78%) is water.

Including water area, Eagle Harbor Township is the second-largest municipality in the state by total area after McMillan Township in Luce County.

=== Major highways ===
- US 41 runs briefly through the narrow central portion of the township.
- M-26 runs through the township near the Lake Superior Shoreline.
- Brockway Mountain Drive is a scenic roadway that runs through the township parallel south of M-26.

=== Communities ===
- Copper Falls is an unincorporated community located within the township at 47°25′48″N 88°11′55″W. The community was settled when the Copper Falls Mine began operating in 1846. The Arnold Mine soon absorbed the area. The Copper Falls Mine post office began operating on September 10, 1860. The post office was originally in Houghton County to the south until it was transferred to Keweenaw County on September 16, 1861. The post office closed on February 15, 1916.
- Eagle Harbor is an unincorporated community and census-designated place located within the township at 47°27′30″N 88°09′44″W.
- Nepco Camp Number 7 is an unincorporated community along the Montreal River within the township at 47°24′12″N 88°08′40″W.
- Windigo is an unincorporated community located at the southwestern end of Isle Royale at 47°54′43″N 89°09′24″W. It was settled around the Windigo Mine, which was an unsuccessful operation owned by the Wendigo Mining Company from 1890 to 1892. The name was derived from the Wendigo, which was a mythological cannibal that was feared by the local Indians. Windigo is now part of Isle Royale National Park and contains a visitor center, amenities, and seasonal tourism services.

== Demographics ==
In 2000, there were 281 people, 122 households, and 81 families residing in the township. The population density was 1.6 inhabitants per square mile (0.62/km^{2}). There were 488 housing units at an average density of 2.7 per square mile (1.0/km^{2}). Since the 2020 census, its population declined to 217.

According to the 2000 census, the racial and ethnic makeup of the township was 96.09% White, 2.14% African American, 0.36% from other races, and 1.42% from two or more races. Hispanic and Latino Americans of any race were 1.42% of the population. Among its population, 22.6% were of German, 21.8% English, 15.2% Polish, 11.1% Irish and 5.8% French ancestry. At the 2021 American Community Survey, 40.2% were of English, 37.7% German, 5.9% Irish, 5.2% Italian, and 4.2% French ancestry.

In 2000, there were 122 households, out of which 4.1% had children under the age of 18 living with them, 60.7% were married couples living together, 3.3% had a female householder with no husband present, and 32.8% were non-families. 30.3% of all households were made up of individuals, and 14.8% had someone living alone who was 65 years of age or older. The average household size was 1.82 and the average family size was 2.17.

The median income for a household in the township was $38,000, and the median income for a family was $46,250 in 2000. Males had a median income of $41,250 versus $22,292 for females. The per capita income for the township was $29,091. None of the families and 3.6% of the population were living below the poverty line. According to 2021 census estimates, the median income for a household in the township was $85,833. Families had a median income of $125,625; married-couple families $127,500; and non-family households $36,964.

== Education ==
The entire township is served by the Public Schools of Calumet located to the southwest in the village of Calumet in Houghton County.

== Gallery ==
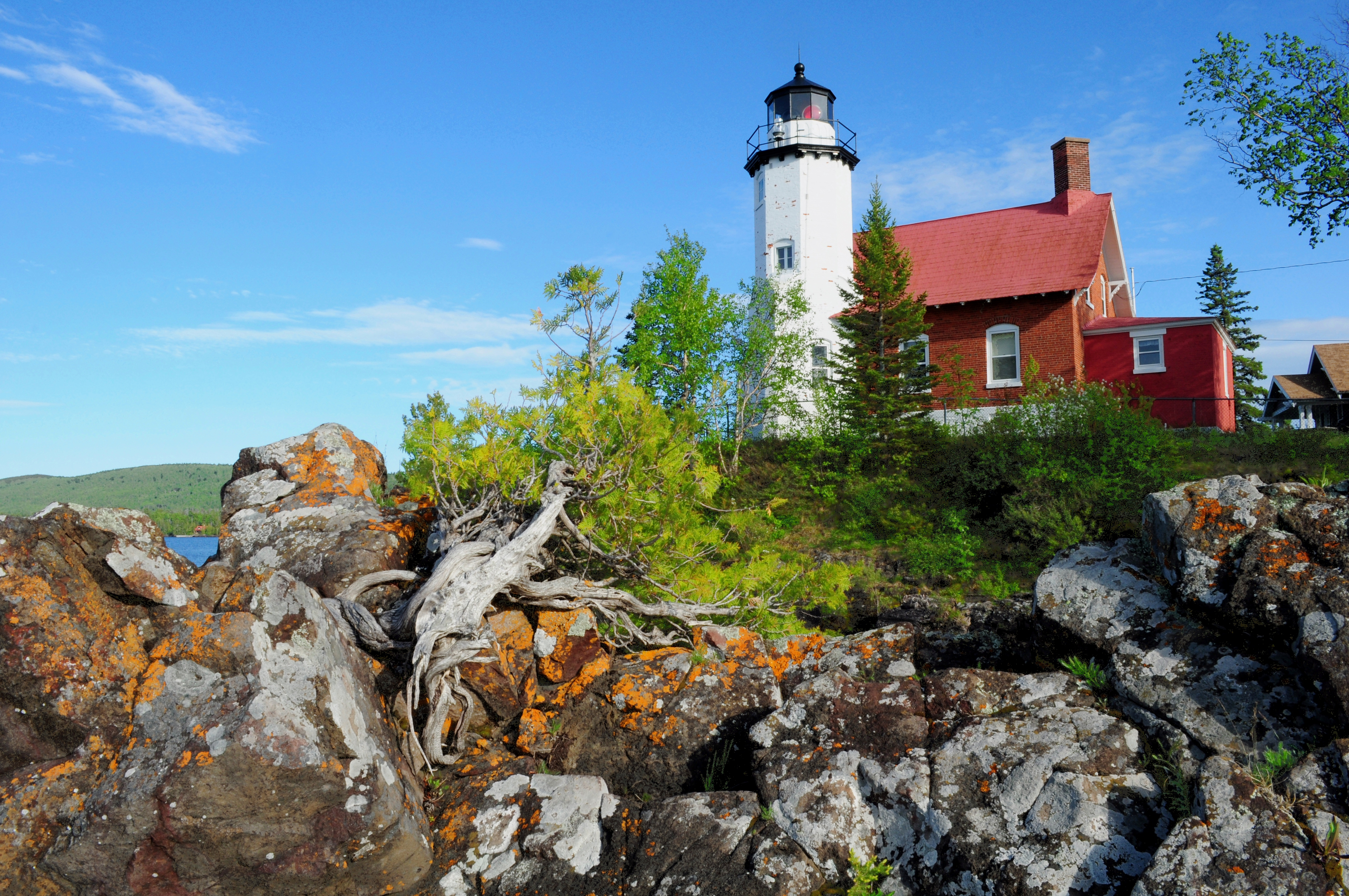
Eagle Harbor Light

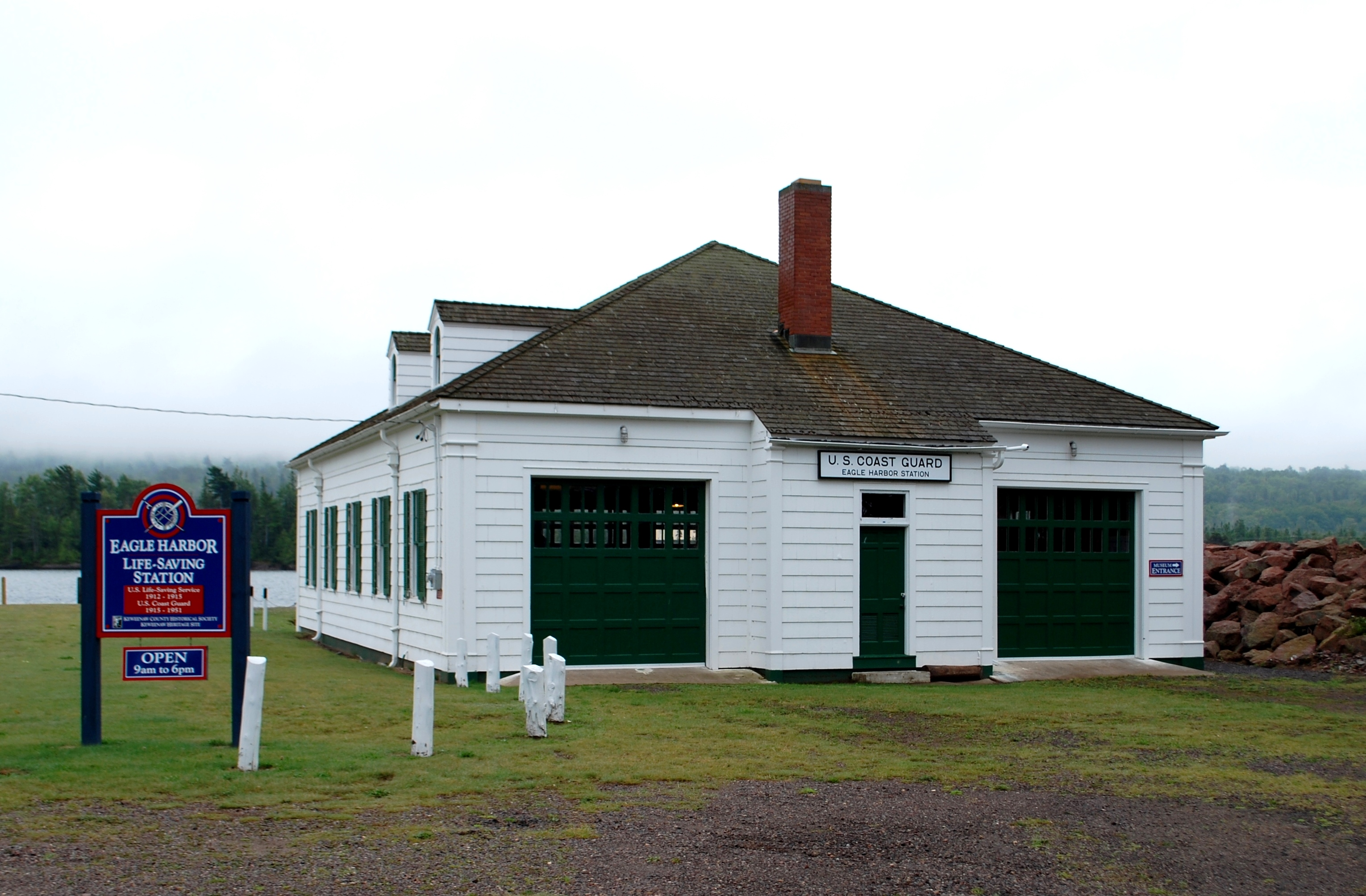
Coast Guard Station Boathouse

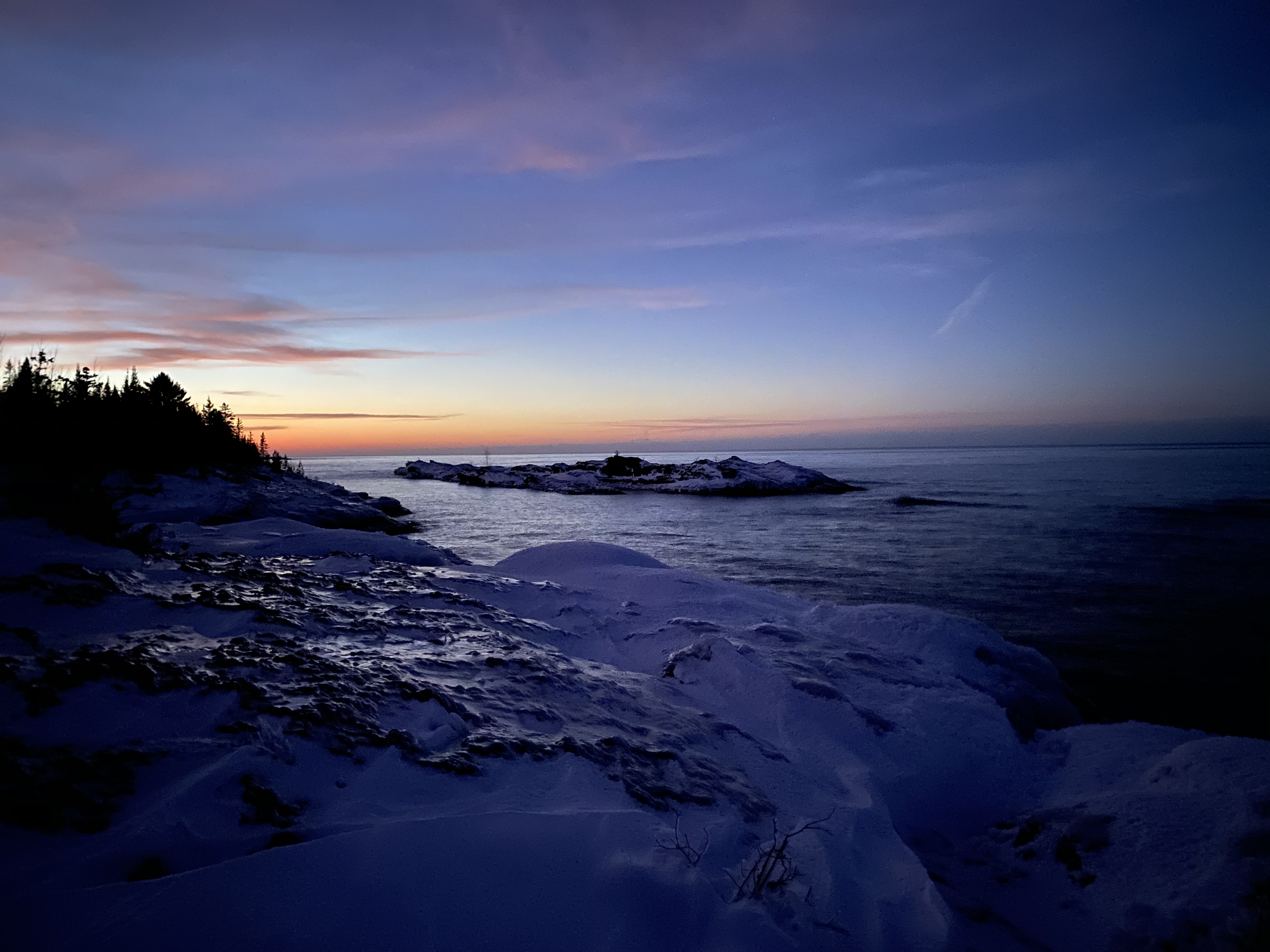
Icy Lake Superior shoreline

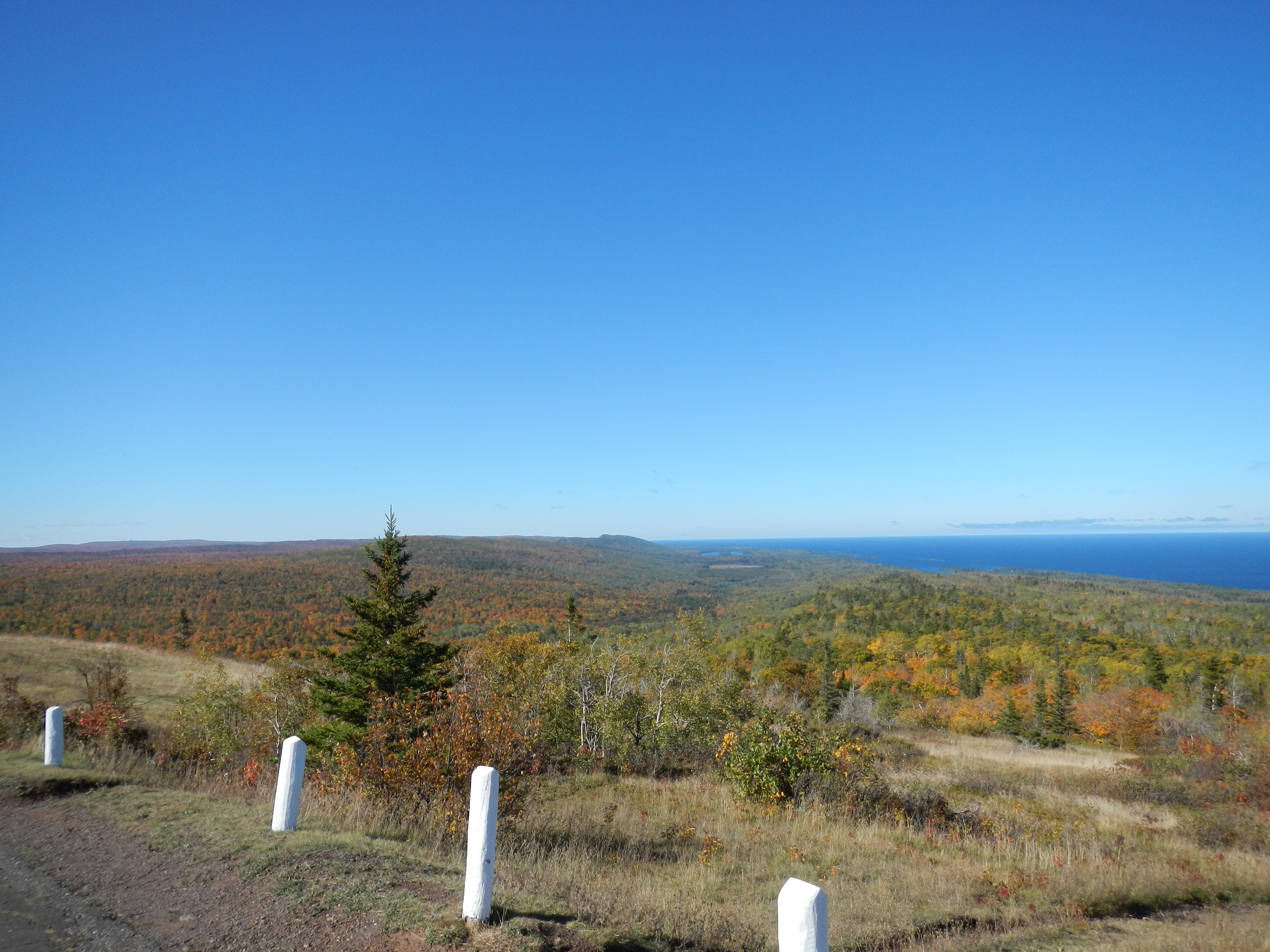
View from a scenic overlook
