= Eagle Harbor Schoolhouse =

Historic schoolhouse

- U.S. National Register of Historic Places
- Michigan State Historic Site
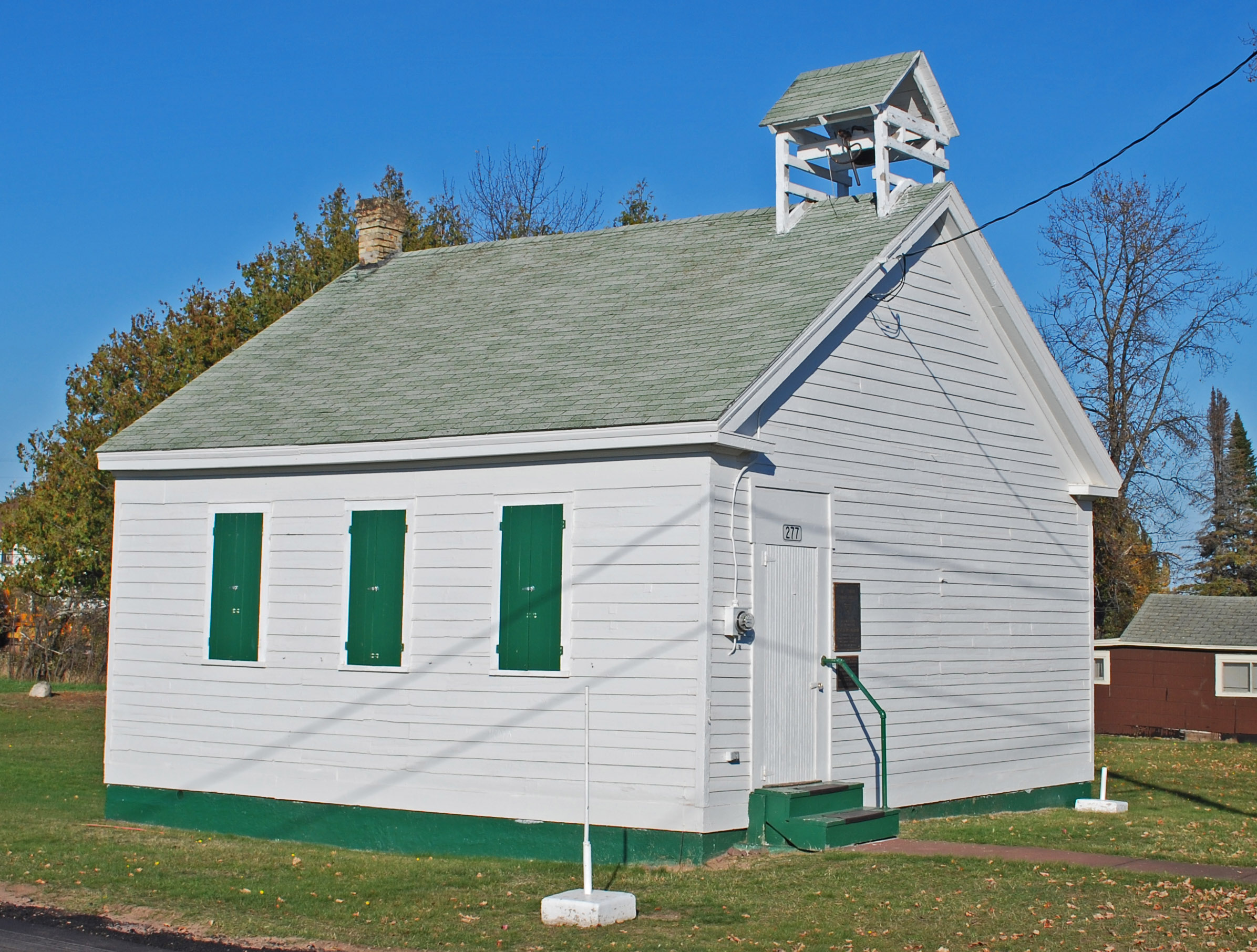

- Location within Michigan Location within the United States
- Interactive map
- Location: Third and Center streets, Eagle Harbor, Michigan, United States
- Coordinates: 47°27′24″N 88°9′46″W
- Area: 1 acre (0.40 ha)
- Built: 1853
- NRHP reference No.: 72000628

Significant dates
- Added to NRHP: 1972-09-22
- Designated MSHS: 1971-12-10

The Eagle Harbor Schoolhouse is a school located at the corner of Third and Center Streets in Eagle Harbor, Michigan, United States. It is significant as the location where Justus H. Rathbone was first inspired to write the ritual which was the basis of the Order of the Knights of Pythias. The schoolhouse was designated a Michigan State Historic Site in 1971 and listed on the National Register of Historic Places in 1972. It is also known as the Pythian Shrine and as the Rathbone School. (Note: "The Rathbone School". Keweenaw County Historical Society. Archived from the original on 2022-06-15.)

== History ==
The Eagle Harbor Schoolhouse was constructed in 1853 by local builders, and opened to serve the community's children that same year. It was the first schoolhouse built in the area.

In about 1859 or 1860, Justus H. Rathbone began a stint as schoolmaster at the school. Rathbone had moved to the Keweenaw Peninsula in 1857 on the advice of his doctor, and taken a position as schoolmaster and part-time clerk at the Central Mine. He later moved on to schools at the Northwest Mine, Eagle River, and to this schoolhouse in Eagle Harbor. While teaching at Eagle Harbor, Rathbone and his friends formed a dramatic society and staged plays, including John Banim's Damon and Pythias. The themes of friendship in the play inspired Rathbone; according to him:

The idea [of establishing a fraternal order] presented itself to me one day while reading over the play at the school-house. It then occurred to me that there was an excellent foundation in the story of Damon and Pythius for a fraternal secret society. The high type of friendship therein portrayed seemed to me to be the basis upon which such a society could and should be established.

During his time teaching in Eagle Harbor, Rathbone wrote the ritual which became the basis for the Order of the Knights of Pythias. Rathbone himself stayed in the Keweenaw only until 1861, when he learned of the death of his father. The Order of the Knights of Pythias was officially founded three years later in Washington, D. C., and was dedicated to the principles of "friendship, charity, and benevolence."

The schoolhouse continued to serve the community until 1892. In the 1920s, the Pythians purchased the schoolhouse and added a gable roof to the existing belfry. A bronze memorial to Rathbone was erected nearby in 1931, and the building currently functions as a Pythian shrine. In 1971, the historical importance of the site was recognized by its designation as a Michigan State Historic Site, and the following year it was listed on the National Register of Historic Places.

In 1982, the schoolhouse was deeded to the Keweenaw County Historical Society. The Society furnished the interior as a period school, and included exhibits related to the Knights of Pythias. The building is open to the public during the summer and early fall.

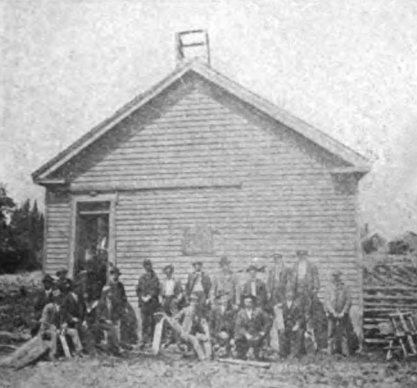
Schoolhouse c. 1906

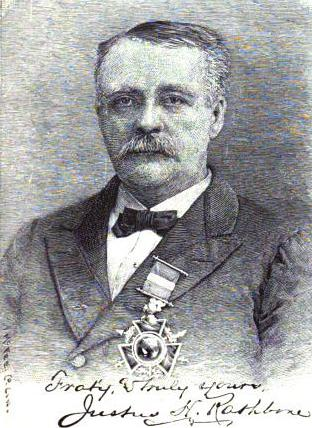
Justus H. Rathbone

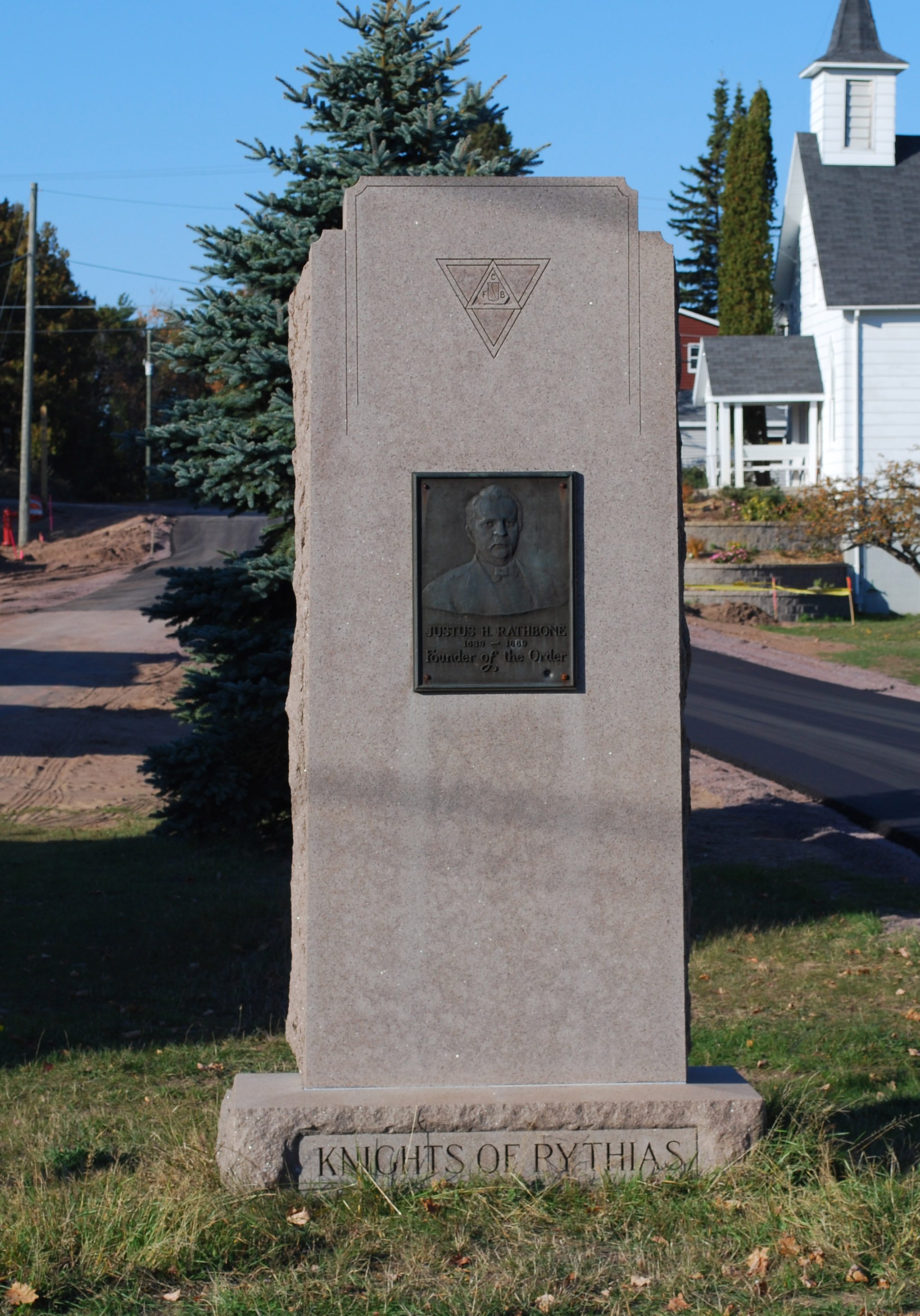
Monument to Justus H. Rathbone located next to the schoolhouse

== Description ==
The Eagle Harbor Schoolhouse is a square building with gabled roof measuring 24 by 24 feet (7.3 m × 7.3 m). The structure is covered with clapboard siding pierced by sash windows covered with shutters. The shingled gable roof has cornice returns, and a gabled belfry frame sits on one end of the roof.
