= Mortar joint =

Spaces between bricks filled with mortar

Some mortar joint styles

In masonry, mortar joints are the spaces between bricks, concrete blocks, or glass blocks, that are filled with mortar or grout. If the surface of the masonry remains unplastered, the joints contribute significantly to the appearance of the masonry. Mortar joints can be made in a series of different fashions, but the most common ones are raked, grapevine, extruded, concave, V, struck, flush, weathered and beaded.

In order to produce a mortar joint, the mason must use one of several types of jointers (slickers), rakes, or beaders. These tools are run through the grout in between the building material before the grout is solid and create the desired outcome the mason seeks.

== Repointing ==
Although good-quality bricks may outlast civilizations, the mortar that bonds them can crack and crumble after a number of years. Water penetration is the greatest degrader of mortar, and different mortar joints allow for varying degrees of water-resistance. For maintenance, degraded mortar joints need to be renewed by removing the old mortar and applying new mortar, a process known as "repointing".

== Types of joints ==
Mortar joints in brickwork take up a considerable large amount of a wall's surface area and have a significant influence on the wall's overall appearance. Some joint profiles accentuate their individual designs, while others merge the bricks and mortar to form a flush, homogeneous surface. Mortar joints vary not only by their appearance, but also by their water-resistance properties.

The following are the most common types of mortar joints:

Concave joint
This popular type of joint is formed in mortar through the use of a curved steel jointing tool. It is very effective at resisting rain penetration due to its recessed profile and the tight seal formed by compacted mortar. Patterns are emphasized on a dense, smooth surface, and small irregularities are hidden.

V-joint
This type of joint can be made with a V-shaped jointer or a trowel soon after the bricks are laid. Ornamental and highly visible, the joint conceals small irregularities and is highly attractive. Like the concave joint, the V-joint is water-resistant because its formation compacts the mortar and its shape directs water away from the seal.

Weather joint
Mortar is recessed increasingly from the bottom to the top of the joint, with the top end not receding more than 3/8-inch into the wall. The straight, inclined surfaces of the bed (horizontal) joints tend to catch the light and give the brickwork a neat, ordered appearance. This joint is less compacted than the concave and V-joints, although it is still suitable for exterior building walls.

Grapevine joint
While most popular during America’s Colonial period, this design is often replicated in newer brickwork. It is created with a grapevine jointer, which is a metal blade with a raised bead that creates an indented line in the center of the mortar joint. These lines are often rough and wavy, simulating the generally straight yet slightly irregular appearance of a grapevine. It is commonly used on matte-finish and antique-finish brickwork.

Extruded (squeezed) joint
This joint design requires no tooling and is formed naturally as excess mortar is squeezed out from between the bricks. The result is a rustic, textured appearance. This design is not recommended for exterior building walls due to the tendency for exposed mortar to break away, degrading the wall’s appearance.

Beaded joint
Raising a rounded, bead-shaped segment of the mortar away from the mortar surface produces this old-fashioned, formal design. Although beaded joints can create interesting shadows, they are not recommended for exterior use due to their exposed ledges.

Struck joint
This joint is formed in a similar fashion as the weathered joint, except that the bottom edge, instead of the top edge, is recessed. It is not water and weather resistant, as it will allow water to collect on its bottom ledge.

Raked joint
For this design, mortar is raked out to a consistent depth. Although often left roughened, it can be compacted for better water-resistance. This design highly emphasizes the joint and is sometimes used in modern buildings in order to match the historic appearance of their locales. Unless it is compressed, it is not as water-resistant as other mortar joints because the design incorporates ledges, which will collect water as it runs down the wall. Also, when mortar is removed from the joints, it becomes smeared on the surfaces of the brick at the recesses. To remove the mortar, contractors often aggressively clean the walls with pressurized water or acid solutions, which can open up additional voids and increase the possibility of water penetration.

Flush joint
This joint is best used when the wall is intended to be plastered or joints are to be hidden under paint. Because of the way the mortar is applied, it may be less water-resistant than some of the other designs.

Tuckpointing
This joint has mortar colored to match the bricks surrounding a line of white mortar to make the joints look very small. The white portion of the tuckpointed joint stands proud of the bricks.
