= Eagle Harbor Light =

Lighthouse in Michigan, United States

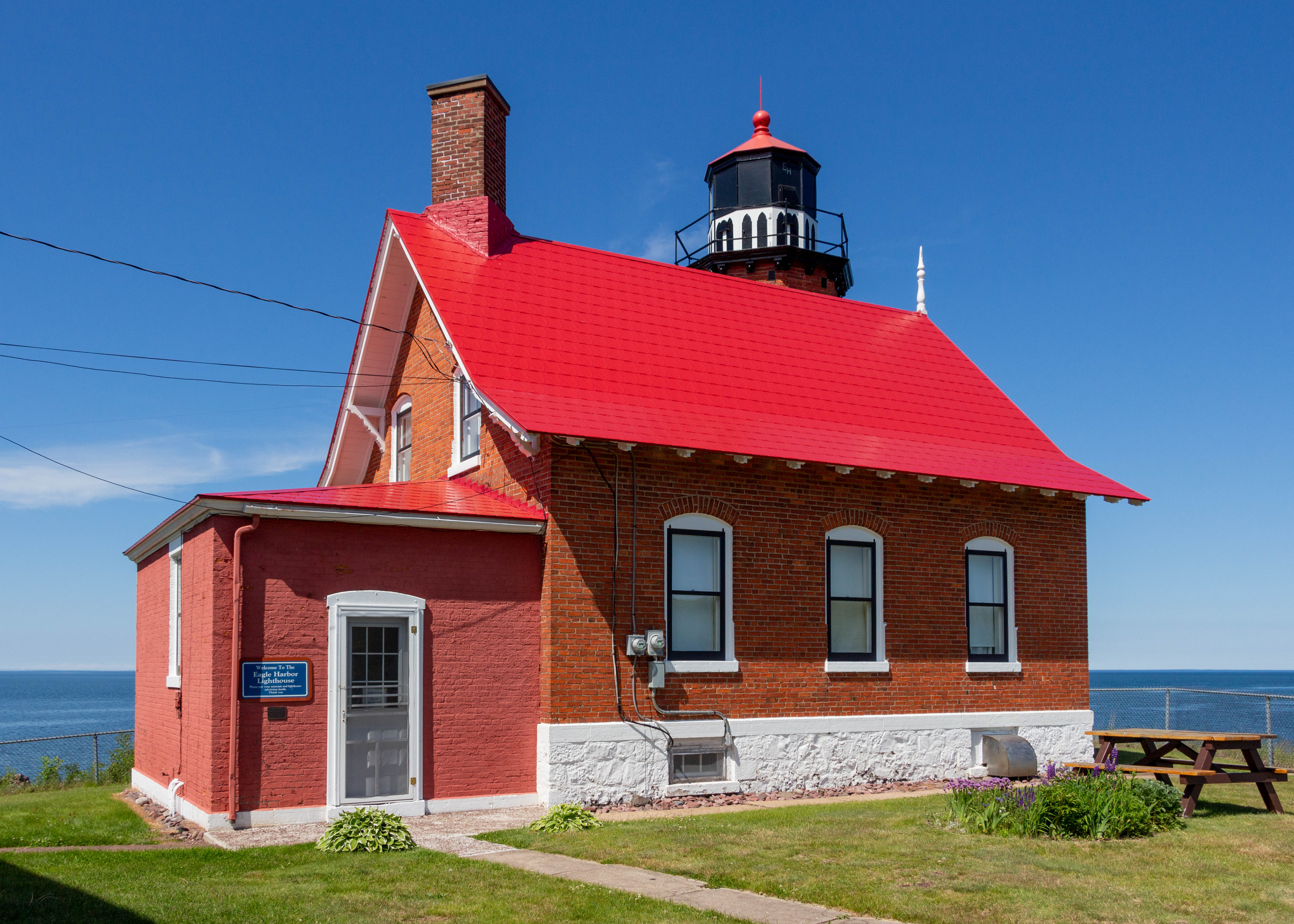
- Location: Eagle Harbor, Eagle Harbor, Michigan
- Coordinates: 47°27′35″N 88°9′33″W

Tower
- Constructed: 1851
- Foundation: Dressed stone and timber
- Construction: Brick
- Automated: 1980
- Height: Tower - 44 feet (13 m)
- Shape: Octagonal
- Markings: natural, black lantern
- Heritage: National Register of Historic Places listed place
- Fog signal: Diaphone 1928-1978 none now

Light
- First lit: 1871 (current structure)
- Focal height: 60 feet (18 m)
- Lens: Fourth order Fresnel lens (original), DCB-224 aero beacons (current)
- Range: 29 nautical miles (54 km; 33 mi)
- Characteristic: Alternating white and red 20s
- Eagle Harbor Light Station
- U.S. National Register of Historic Places
- Built: 1871
- MPS: U.S. Coast Guard Lighthouses and Light Stations on the Great Lakes TR
- NRHP reference No.: 84001745
- Added to NRHP: July 19, 1984

Eagle Harbor Light is an operational lighthouse at Eagle Harbor, in Keweenaw County in the state of Michigan. It sits on the rocky entrance to Eagle Harbor and is one of several light stations that guide mariners on Lake Superior across the northern edge of the Keweenaw Peninsula. The original lighthouse, built in 1851, was replaced in 1871 by the present red brick structure, which is a Michigan State Historic Site and listed on the National Register of Historic Places.

== History ==
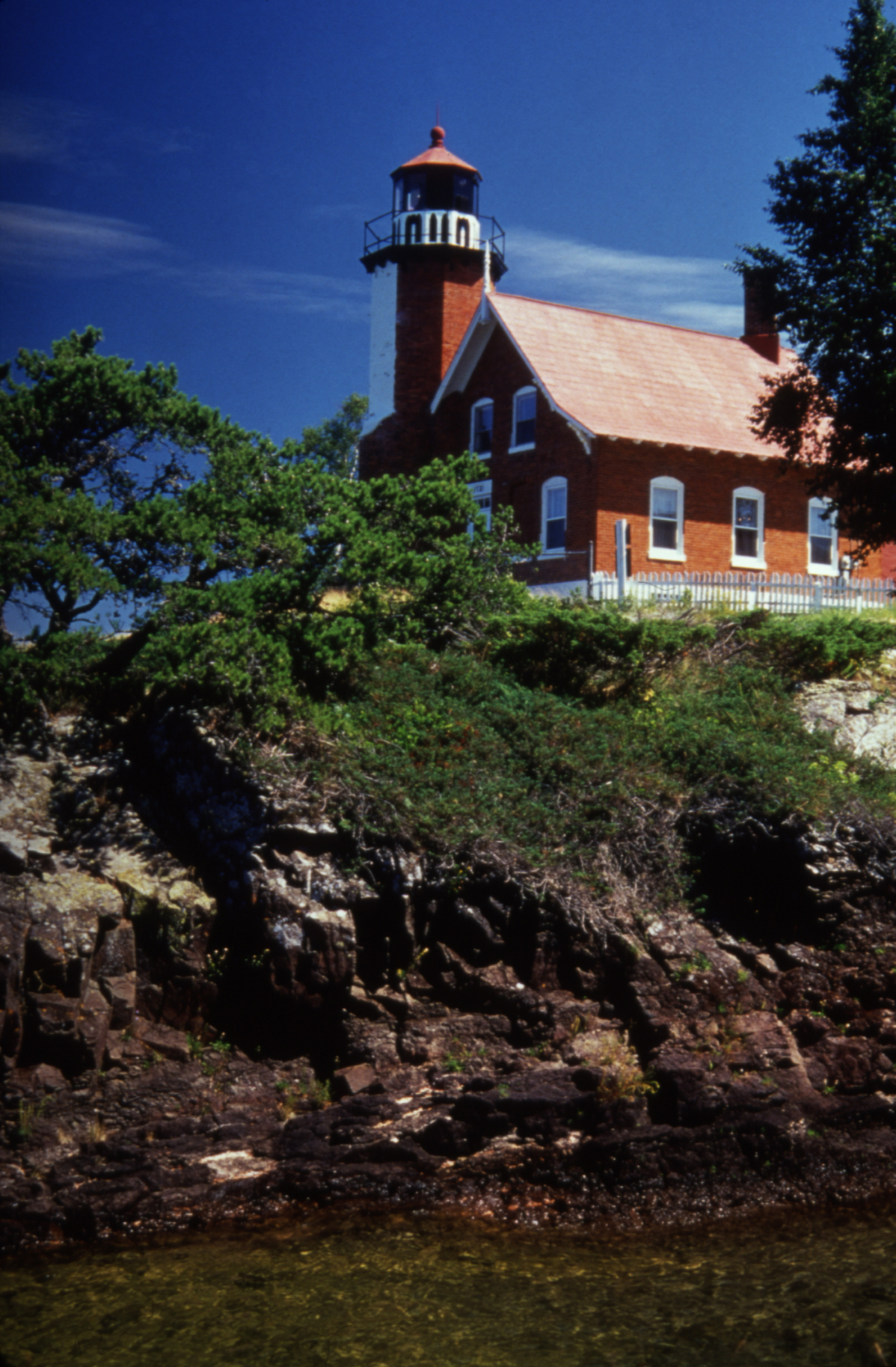
Eagle Harbor Lighthouse

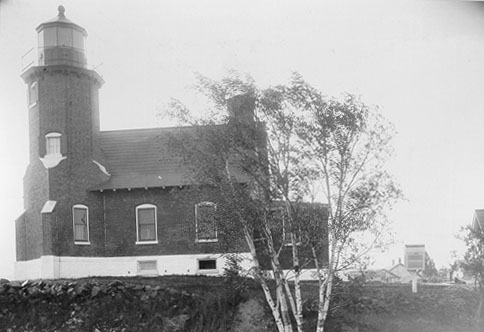
U.S. Coast Guard Archive

Edward Taylor was the first to realize the commercial potential of Eagle Harbor, building a short timber pier in the bay in 1844 from which to supply the growing number of miners in the area. A rocky ledge with only eight feet of water above it spread across the harbor entry, and represented a barrier to vessels of deep draft. However, the copper boom saw an increasing number of vessels visiting the dock, and Taylor began to lobby for federal funding for improving the entry into the harbor.

The original Eagle Harbor Light was built in 1851. The structure took the form of a rubble stone keeper's dwelling with a square white-painted wooden tower integrated into one end of the roof. The tower was capped with an octagonal wooden lantern with multiple glass panes, and outfitted with an array of Lewis lamps with reflectors. With the lamps standing 21 feet (6.4 m) above the dwelling's foundation, the building's location on high ground placed the lamps at a focal plane of 47 feet (14 m) above lake level.

By 1865, a total of four new Keepers had worked at the station, with two of them removed from office, one resigning, and one dying after only seven months at the station. The structure was deteriorating and was replaced in 1871 using a design that had previously been used for Chambers Island Lighthouse in Wisconsin; and McGulpin Point Light in 1868. It was thereafter used at White River Light in 1875; and Sand Island Light (Wisconsin) in 1881. The octagonal brick light tower is ten feet in diameter, with walls 12 inches (300 mm) thick and it supports a 10-sided cast iron lantern. The Lighthouse was staffed by a head keeper and two assistant keepers.

In 1999 the Congress of the United States transferred ownership of the Eagle Harbor Light Station to the Keweenaw County Historical Society. The Coast Guard continues to operate the light at the top of the tower.

== Museums ==
The Keweenaw County Historical Society operates the lighthouse as a museum, and also operates other museums at the site, including the Maritime Museum in the old fog signal building, the Commercial Fishing Museum, the Keweenaw History Museum and an exhibit on the 1926 shipwreck of the City of Bangor.

== See also ==
- Lighthouses in the United States
