= Eagle Harbor, Michigan =

- Census-designated place (CDP) & unincorporated community
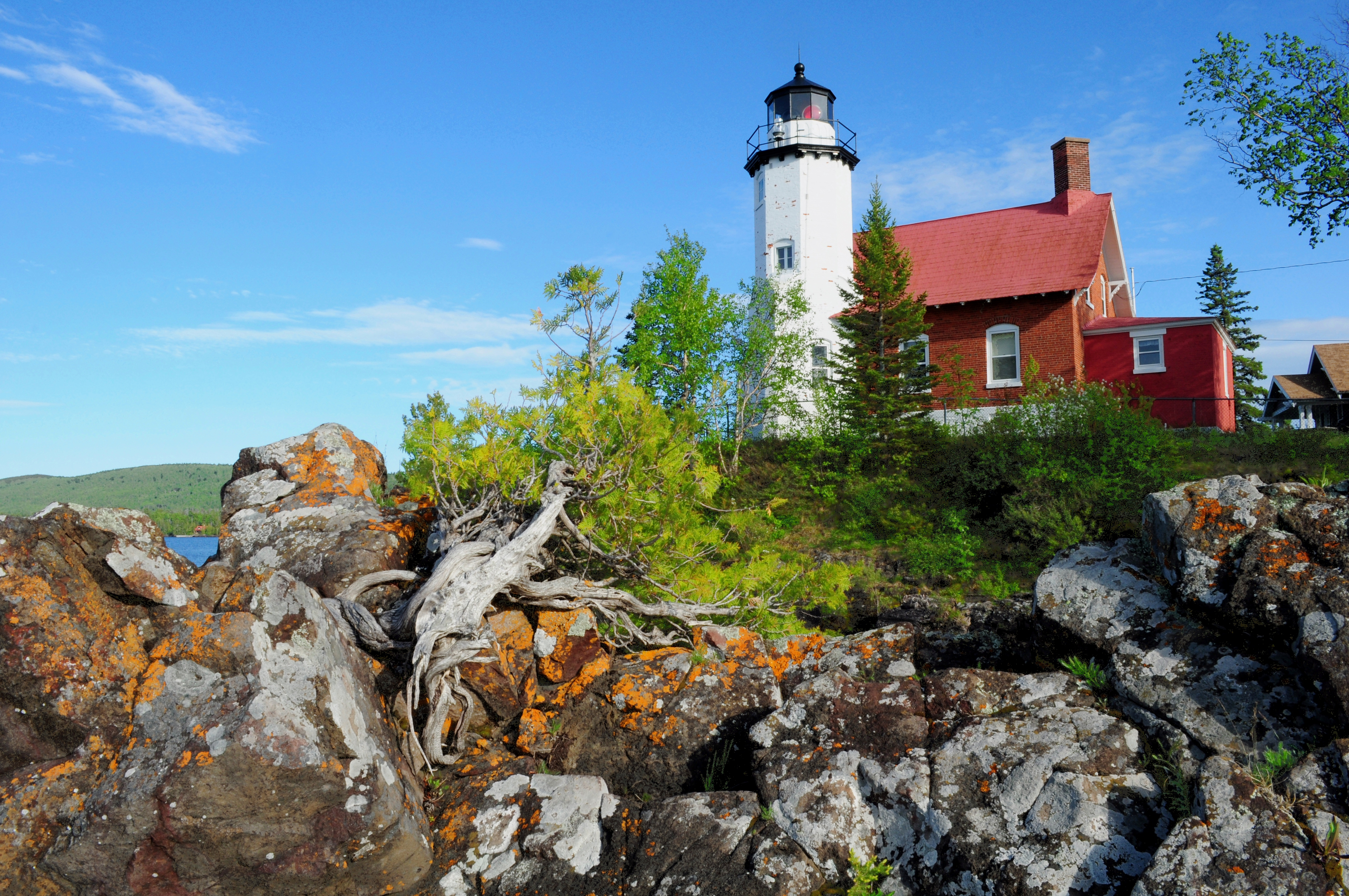
- The Eagle Harbor Light within Eagle Harbor

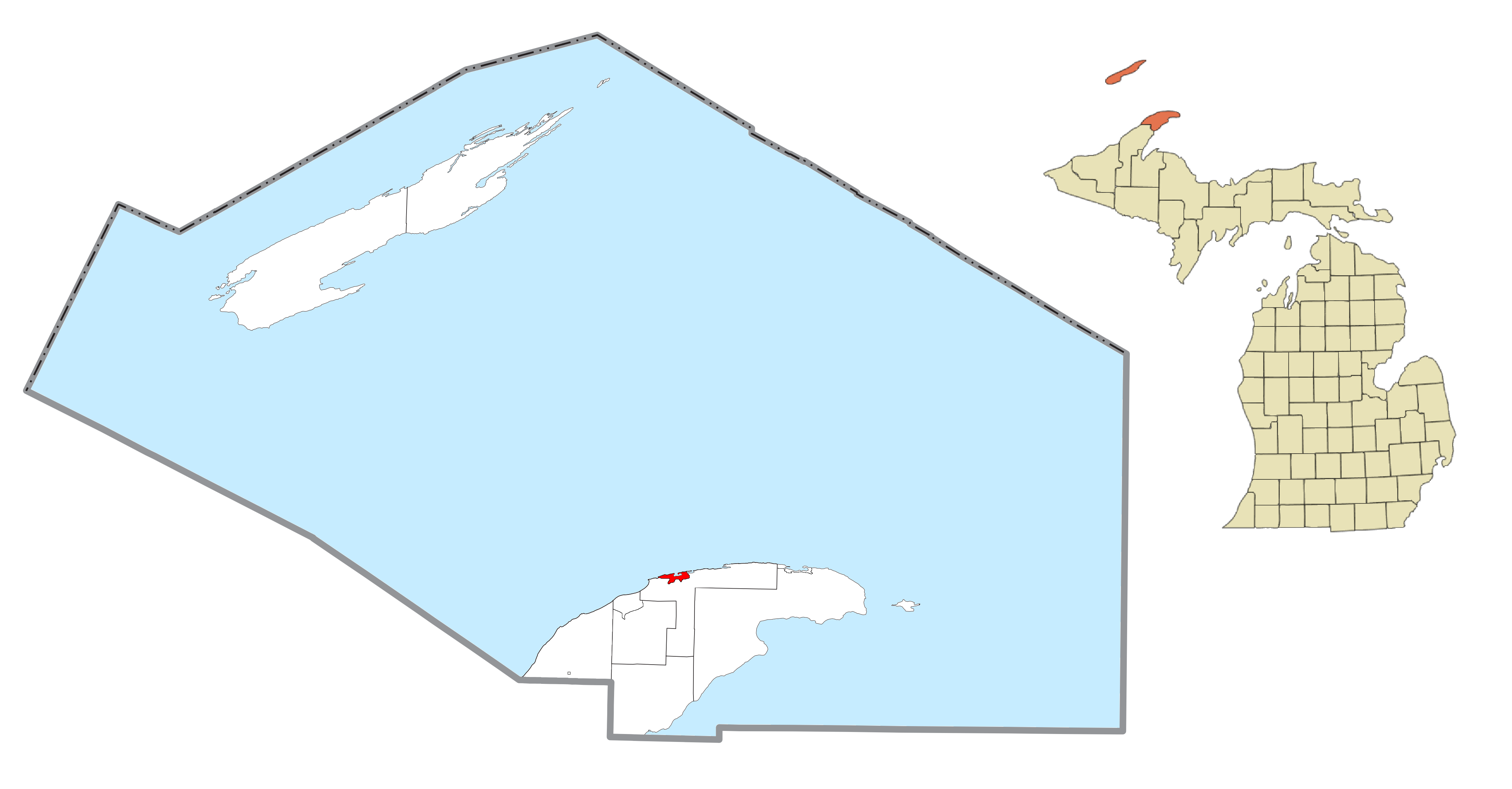
- Location within Keweenaw County

- Location within the state of Michigan Location within the United States
- Coordinates: 47°27′30″N 88°09′44″W
- Country: United States
- State: Michigan
- County: Keweenaw
- Township: Eagle Harbor

Area
  - Total: 2.06 sq mi (5.33 km^{2})
  - Land: 1.80 sq mi (4.67 km^{2})
  - Water: 0.25 sq mi (0.66 km^{2})
- Elevation: 620 ft (190 m)

Population (2020)
  - Total: 69
  - Density: 38.3/sq mi (14.78/km^{2})
- Time zone: UTC-5 (Eastern (EST))
  - Summer (DST): UTC-4 (EDT)
- ZIP code(s): 49950 (Mohawk)
- Area code: 906
- GNIS feature ID: 625075

Eagle Harbor is an unincorporated community and census-designated place located on the north side of the Keweenaw Peninsula within Eagle Harbor Township, located on the tip of Michigan's northernmost county, Keweenaw County, in the U.S. State of Michigan. Its population was 69 as of the 2020 census. M-26 passes through this community. This hamlet was especially popular with the sailors in days past, as it had a good steamboat landing and is about equally distant from Sault Sainte Marie, Michigan, and Duluth, Minnesota. It was the first stop for supplies for the many boats on Lake Superior.

== History ==
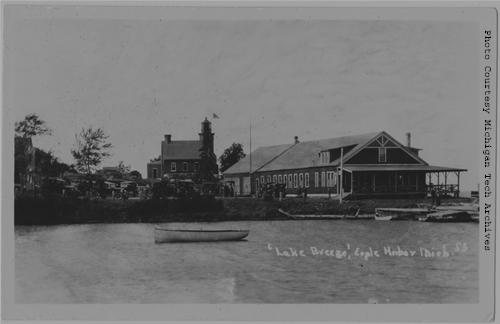
Lake Breeze Hotel with the Eagle Harbor Light in the background.

Eagle Harbor is known in the Ojibwe language as Ginoozhegoong, meaning "place of the northern pike".

The earliest known non-indigenous settlement at Eagle Harbor was a log warehouse built in 1844. In 1845, the Eagle Harbor Mining Company was established there to mine copper. In 1853, the Eagle Harbor Schoolhouse was established. A post office operated at Eagle Harbor from 1857 through 1959.

The Eagle Harbor Light was first constructed in 1851. A rocky ledge originally obstructed entrance to the harbor for larger ships, but in the late 1870s a 14 foot (4.3 m)-deep channel was dredged at the entrance to the harbor.

=== Recent history ===
Eagle Harbor is the birthplace of Guts Frisbee. Rich Warden first encountered frisbee in 1955 as a freshman at Dartmouth College. He later introduced the idea of frisbee as a sport and spun Pluto Platters about the Harbor beach with the Healy brothers. Guts Frisbee was invented in 1958 by Tim, Jake, Boots and Beka Healy. After more than a decade of frisbee competitions Governor Milliken proclaimed July 6th, 1969, to be Frisbee Day in Michigan to recognize the high importance of the 12th Annual International Frisbee Tournament.. Harvey J. Kukuk (a shared persona embodying frisbee culture, authority and legend) ventured away for a time to become director of the International Frisbee Association.

In 1983, the Holy Protection Monastery of the Society of St. John belonging to the Ukrainian Metropoly was formed in Eagle Harbor and is known for its Poorrock Abbey brand of fruit preserves.

Eagle Harbor was listed as a newly organized census-designated place for the 2010 census, giving it officially defined boundaries and population statistics for the first time.

== Climate ==
Eagle Harbor has a humid continental climate (Dfb). Summers are short but warm with cool nights. Winters are long, cold, and very snowy due to lake effect snow from Lake Superior. Precipitation is relatively uniform year round.

Climate data for Eagle Harbor, Michigan
Month	Jan	Feb	Mar	Apr	May	Jun	Jul	Aug	Sep	Oct	Nov	Dec	Year
Record high °F (°C)	51 (11)	57 (14)	70 (21)	80 (27)	91 (33)	95 (35)	100 (38)	98 (37)	91 (33)	85 (29)	71 (22)	57 (14)	100 (38)
Mean daily maximum °F (°C)	24.1 (−4.4)	23.8 (−4.6)	33.1 (0.6)	44.8 (7.1)	56.0 (13.3)	65.9 (18.8)	71.8 (22.1)	70.7 (21.5)	63.8 (17.7)	54.2 (12.3)	40.2 (4.6)	29.0 (−1.7)	48.1 (8.9)
Mean daily minimum °F (°C)	11.8 (−11.2)	10.2 (−12.1)	18.3 (−7.6)	29.9 (−1.2)	37.4 (3.0)	45.3 (7.4)	53.0 (11.7)	54.2 (12.3)	48.7 (9.3)	40.4 (4.7)	29.0 (−1.7)	18.3 (−7.6)	33.0 (0.6)
Record low °F (°C)	−26 (−32)	−20 (−29)	−20 (−29)	1 (−17)	13 (−11)	25 (−4)	36 (2)	36 (2)	30 (−1)	19 (−7)	2 (−17)	−13 (−25)	−26 (−32)
Average precipitation inches (mm)	1.78 (45)	1.63 (41)	1.66 (42)	1.89 (48)	2.63 (67)	2.87 (73)	2.41 (61)	2.80 (71)	3.04 (77)	2.17 (55)	2.22 (56)	1.84 (47)	26.95 (685)
Average snowfall inches (cm)	19.5 (50)	19.1 (49)	11.8 (30)	4.4 (11)	0.4 (1.0)	0.0 (0.0)	0.0 (0.0)	0.0 (0.0)	0.0 (0.0)	0.4 (1.0)	8.7 (22)	19.5 (50)	84.0 (213)

== Demographics ==
Historical population
Census	Pop.	Note	%±
2010	76		—
2020	69		−9.2%
U.S. Decennial Census

As of 2020, the population of Eagle Harbor was 69 and its median household income was $76,406.
