= Labelle (disambiguation) =

Labelle was an American R&B and soul girl group.

Labelle, LaBelle or La Belle, the last being French for "the beautiful one" (feminine), may also refer to:

== Places ==
=== Canada ===
- Labelle, Nova Scotia, a community
- Labelle, Quebec, a village and municipality
- Labelle (federal electoral district), Quebec
- Labelle (provincial electoral district), Quebec
- Labelle County, Quebec, a former county

=== United States ===
- LaBelle, Florida, a city
  - LaBelle Municipal Airport
- La Belle, Missouri, a city
- La Belle, New Mexico, a ghost town
- La Belle, Pennsylvania, an unincorporated community
- La Belle, Texas, an unincorporated community
- La Belle Township, Lewis County, Missouri, an inactive township
- La Belle Township, Marshall County, South Dakota
- Lac La Belle (Michigan), a lake
- La Belle Iron Works, Wheeling, West Virginia, on the National Register of Historic Places, demolished in 2017
- La Belle Cemetery, Oconomowoc, Wisconsin

=== Elsewhere ===
- La Belle Station, Northern Territory, Australia
- La Belle Rivière, Quebec, Canada, a river
- LaBelle Valley, Victoria Land, Antarctica

== People ==
- Alexandra Labelle (born 1996), Canadian professional ice hockey forward
- Antoine Labelle (1833–1891), Canadian Roman Catholic priest
- Chuck Labelle (born 1954), Franco-Canadian singer-songwriter
- Doug LaBelle II (born 1975), American professional golfer
- Gabriel LaBelle (born 2002), Canadian actor
- James D. La Belle (1925–1945), US Marine posthumously awarded the Medal of Honor
- James W. LaBelle, American astrophysicist
- Jean-Baptiste Labelle (1825–1898), Canadian musician
- Jean-Baptiste Labelle (politician) (1836–1887), Canadian ship captain and politician
- Jenijoy La Belle (1943–2025), American English professor
- Kaleo La Belle, director of the 2010 documentary Beyond This Place
- Leah LaBelle (1986–2018), Canadian-born American singer
- Marc LaBelle (born 1969), Canadian ice hockey player
- Patti LaBelle (born 1944), American singer and actress

== Other uses ==
- Labelle (album), the girl group's 1972 debut album
- La Belle (discotheque), site of a 1986 bombing in Berlin, Germany
- La Belle, a 2000 Korean movie starring Oh Ji-ho
- La Belle (ship), a 17th century French ship

== See also ==
- Labille, a surname
- Stefano della Bella (1610–1664), Italian draughtsman and printmaker
- Lac La Belle (disambiguation)
