= Ice stalactite =

Ice stalactite may refer to:

- Ice stalactites – a stalactite ice formation in a cave
- Brinicle – an icicle forming under sea ice
