= Lac La Belle =

Lac La Belle may refer to:

== Communities ==
- Lac La Belle, Michigan, an unincorporated community
- Lac La Belle, Wisconsin, a village
- Lake Lac La Belle, Wisconsin, an unincorporated community and former CDP

== Waterbodies ==
- Lac La Belle (Michigan), a lake

== See also ==
- SS Lac La Belle
