= Mendota (Bete Grise) Light =

Lighthouse in Michigan, United States

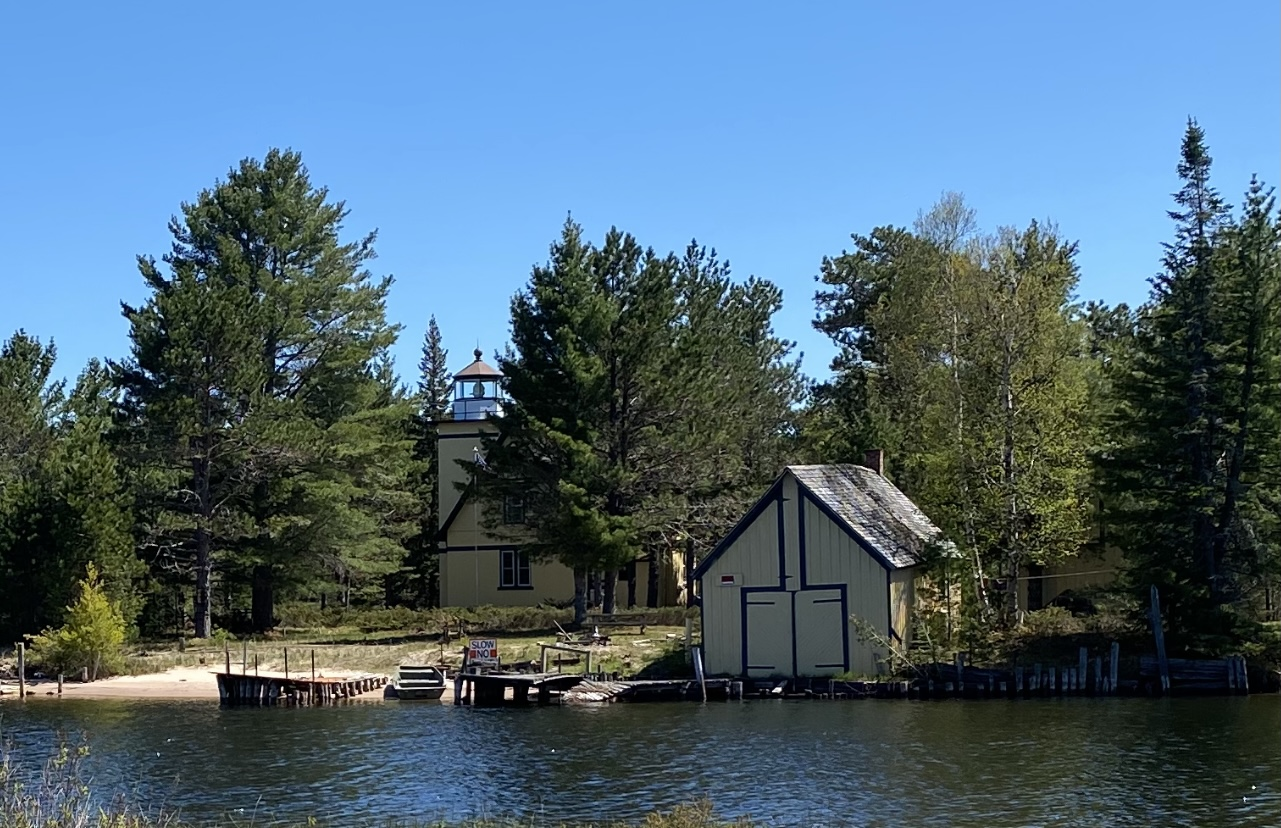
- Looking across the Mendota Channel
- Location: Bete Grise, Delaware, Michigan
- Coordinates: 47°22′27″N 87°58′00″W

Tower
- Constructed: 1895
- Construction: Brick
- Height: 42 feet (13 m)
- Shape: Square, attached T-shaped bldg. w/steep gable roof.
- Markings: Yellow with black lantern
- Heritage: National Register of Historic Places listed place

Light
- First lit: 1895, 1998
- Deactivated: 1956
- Focal height: 44 feet (13 m)
- Lens: 4th Order Fresnel Lens
- Range: 14 nmi (26 km; 16 mi)
- Characteristic: Flash W 20 secs.
- Bete Gris Lighthouse
- U.S. National Register of Historic Places
- Location: Mendota, Michigan
- MPS: Historic Engineering and Industrial Sites in Michigan TR
- NRHP reference No.: 80004840
- Added to NRHP: August 29, 1980

The Mendota Light, also known as the Bete Grise light, was built on the Keweenaw Peninsula of Michigan to facilitate travel between Lake Superior and Lac La Belle (an artificial canal having been made to connect the two).

== History ==
The original plans were laid in 1867 and the lighthouse was constructed in 1869. Only one year later, the light was decommissioned as it was found by navigators to be of no assistance (nor was there any other commercial reason to make this trip).

The tower was removed and taken to Marquette, but the keeper's house remained in place. In 1892, ships tried to use this bay for a safe harbor during a storm, and the seafarers, observing the house (at this point deserted), suggested that the harbor would be easier to find if there was a light present. By 1895, funds had been allocated to re-establish the light, but it was determined that the existing structure had deteriorated so much that it could not be used. A new structure was built using the original foundations.

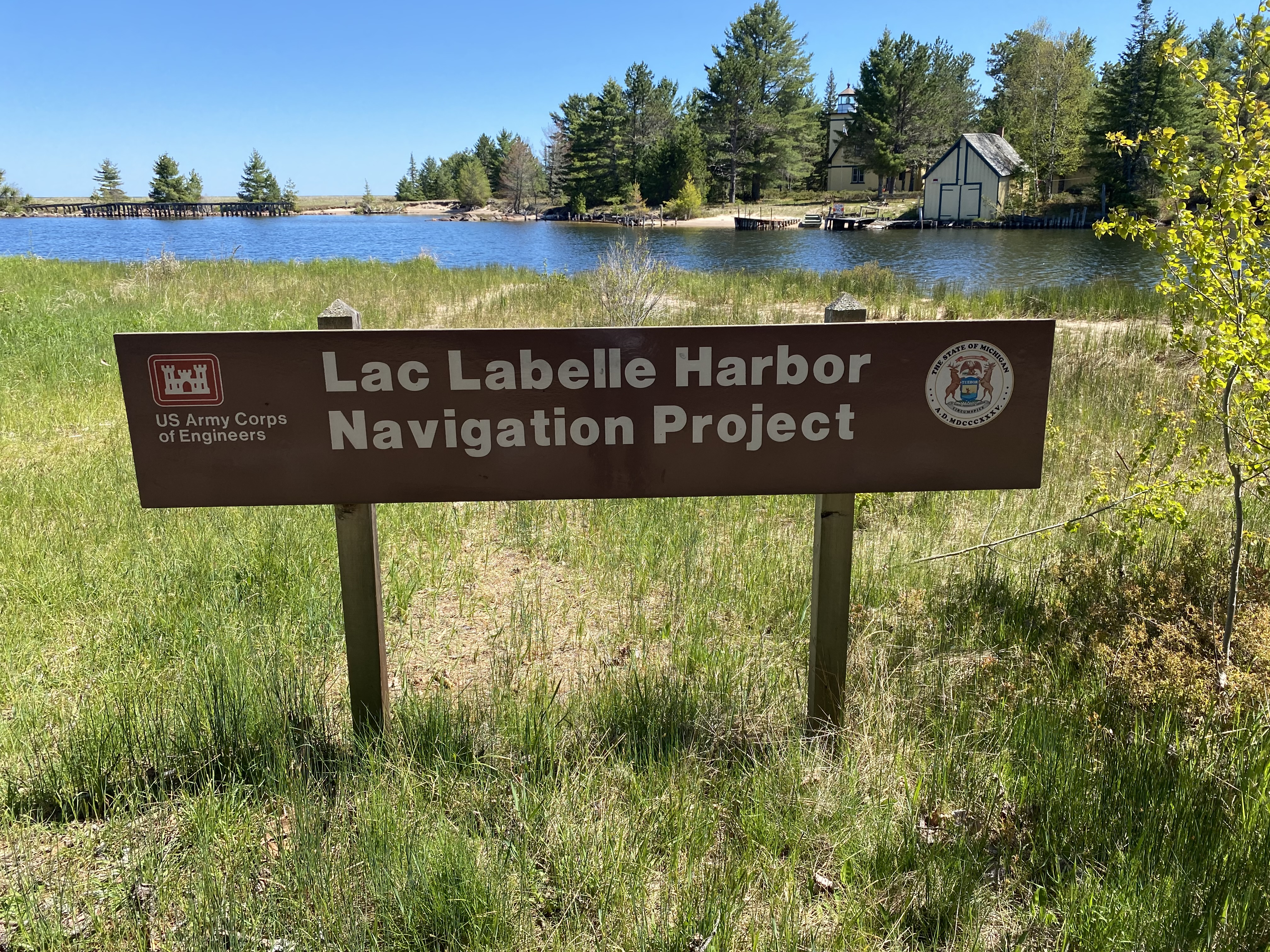
Lac La Belle Harbor Navigation Sign.

In 1933 the light was automated and in 1956 it was decommissioned.

It was a private residence until 1996. The lighthouse, only accessible by boat since no roads or private drives lead to it, was for sale in 1996. It was sold to a person willing to conserve the light. The original fourth order Fresnel lens was found, restored and in 1998 relit. It is still in place and in use. Efforts are being made to maintain the light for the "next 100 years".

The light is now classified as an active private aid to navigation.

To view the light, travel to the Keweenaw Peninsula of Upper Michigan to the town of Bete Grise. The road ends at the Mendota Ship Canal. Take the short walk to the Ship Canal. You will see the station boathouse across the Canal, and the Mendota Light itself a little to the east.

National Register Status: PART OF LISTING; Reference #80004840 Name of Listing: HISTORIC ENGINEERING & INDUSTRIAL SITES IN MICHIGAN TR.
