= Lake Gratiot =

Lake in Keweenaw County, Michigan, United States

- Location within Michigan Location within the United States
- Location: Eagle Harbor Township and Grant Township, Keweenaw County, Michigan
- Coordinates: 47.3552026°N 88.1268111°W
- Primary outflows: Little Gratiot River
- Surface area: 1,438 acres (582 ha)
- Max. depth: 70 feet (21 m)
- Surface elevation: 741 feet (226 m)

Lake Gratiot (/ˈɡræʃɪt/ GRASH-it) is a 1,438-acre (582 ha) lake in Keweenaw County, Michigan. The lake is surrounded by dense forest of the Keweenaw Peninsula. The bottom is mainly muck and it has a maximum depth of 70 feet (21 m). The lake flows through the Little Gratiot River into Lac La Belle and then into Lake Superior.

== See also ==
- List of lakes in Michigan
