= Stalactite =

Elongated mineral formation hanging down from a cave ceiling

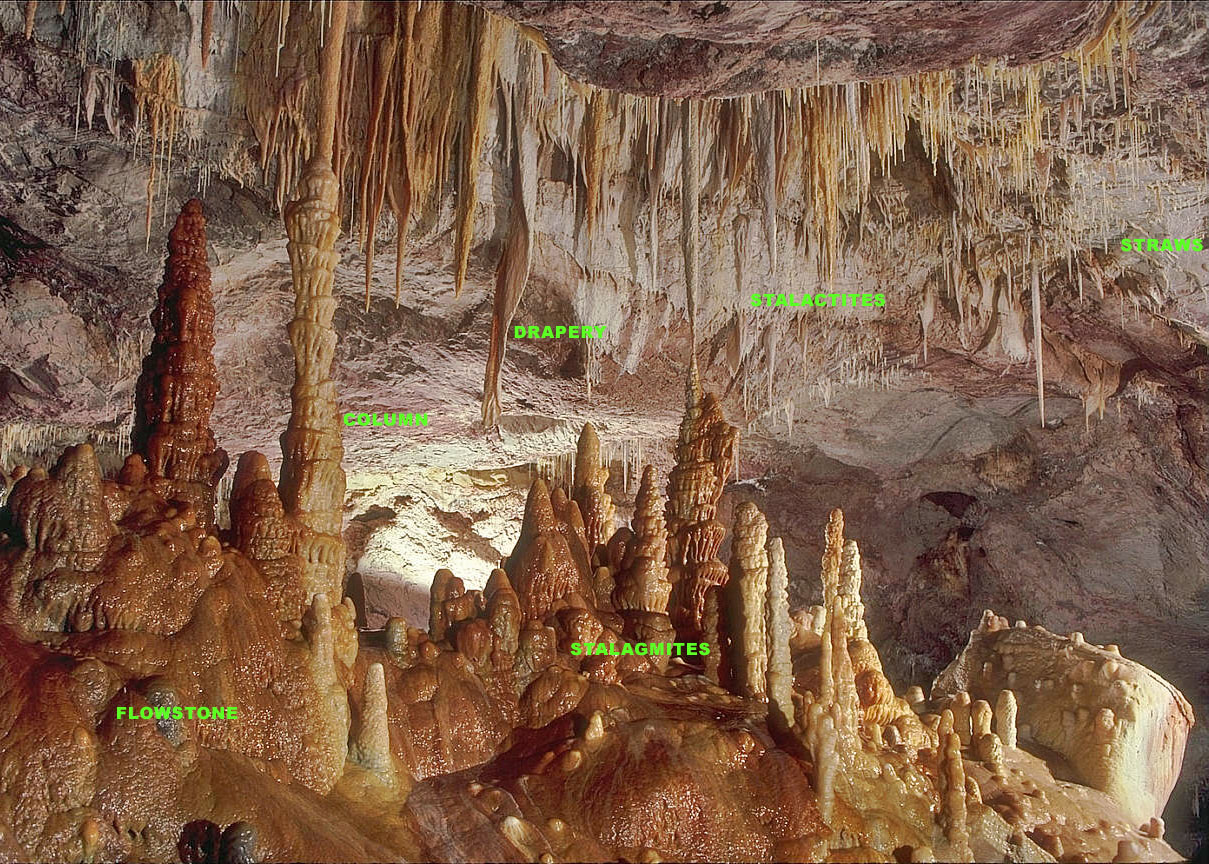
Image showing the six most common speleothems with labels. Enlarge to view labels.

A stalactite (UK: /ˈstæləkˌtaɪt/, US: /stəˈlæktaɪt/; from Ancient Greek σταλακτός (stalaktós) 'dripping', from σταλάσσειν (stalássein) 'to drip') is a mineral formation that hangs from the ceiling of caves, hot springs, or man-made structures such as bridges and mines. Any material that is soluble and that can be deposited as a colloid, or is in suspension, or is capable of being melted, may form a stalactite. Stalactites may be composed of lava, minerals, mud, peat, pitch, sand, sinter, and amberat (crystallized urine of pack rats). A stalactite is not necessarily a speleothem, though speleothems are the most common form of stalactite because of the abundance of limestone caves.

The corresponding formation on the floor of the cave is known as a stalagmite.

== Formation and type ==
Demonstration of drip stone formation in a lab. The blue color is due to the addition of cupric ions (Cu^{2+}) to the mother solution.

=== Limestone stalactites ===
The most common stalactites are speleothems, which occur in limestone caves. They form through deposition of calcium carbonate and other minerals, which is precipitated from mineralized water solutions. Limestone is the chief form of calcium carbonate rock which is dissolved by water that contains carbon dioxide, forming a calcium bicarbonate solution in caverns. The chemical formula for this reaction is:

CaCO_{3}(s) + H_{2}O(l) + CO_{2}(aq) → Ca(HCO_{3})_{2}(aq)

This solution travels through the rock until it reaches an edge and if this is on the roof of a cave it will drip down. When the solution comes into contact with air the chemical reaction that created it is reversed and particles of calcium carbonate are deposited. The reversed reaction is:

Ca(HCO_{3})_{2}(aq) → CaCO_{3}(s) + H_{2}O(l) + CO_{2}(aq)

An average growth rate is 0.13 mm (0.0051 inches) a year. The quickest growing stalactites are those formed by a constant supply of slow dripping water rich in calcium carbonate (CaCO_{3}) and carbon dioxide (CO_{2}), which can grow at 3 mm (0.12 inches) per year. The drip rate must be slow enough to allow the CO_{2} to degas from the solution into the cave atmosphere, resulting in deposition of CaCO_{3} on the stalactite. Too fast a drip rate and the solution, still carrying most of the CaCO_{3}, falls to the cave floor where degassing occurs and CaCO_{3} is deposited as a stalagmite.

All limestone stalactites begin with a single mineral-laden drop of water. When the drop falls, it deposits the thinnest ring of calcite. Each subsequent drop that forms and falls deposits another calcite ring. Eventually, these rings form a very narrow (≈4 to 5 mm diameter), hollow tube commonly known as a "soda straw" stalactite. Soda straws can grow quite long, but are very fragile. If they become plugged by debris, water begins flowing over the outside, depositing more calcite and creating the more familiar cone-shaped stalactite.

Stalactite formation generally begins over a large area, with multiple paths for the mineral rich water to flow. As minerals are dissolved in one channel slightly more than other competing channels, the dominant channel begins to draw more and more of the available water, which speeds its growth, ultimately resulting in all other channels being choked off. This is one reason why formations tend to have minimum distances from one another. The larger the formation, the greater the interformation distance.

==== Pillars ====
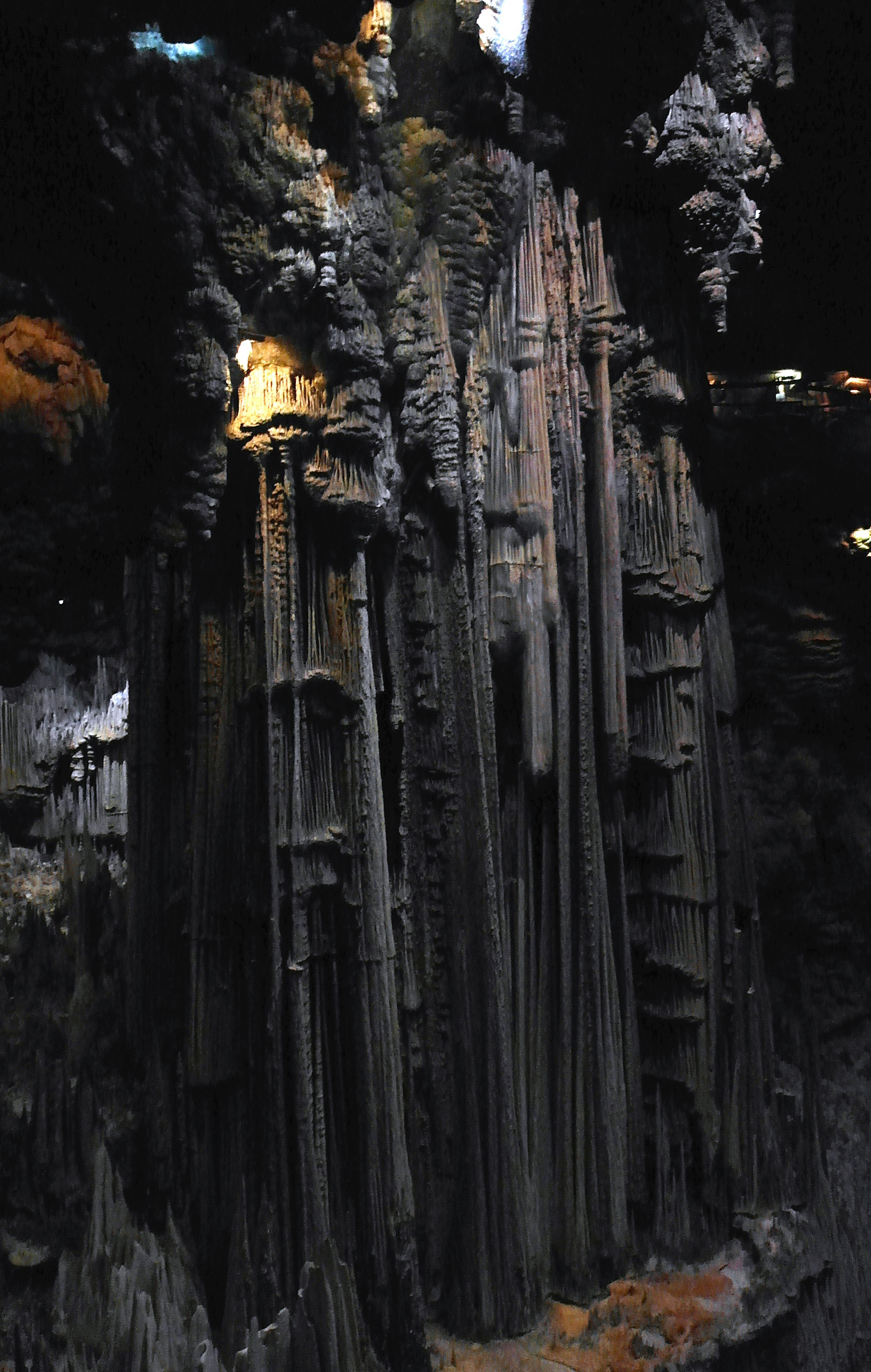
Pillars in the Caves of Nerja, Spain

The same water drops that fall from the tip of a stalactite deposit more calcite on the floor below, eventually resulting in a rounded or cone-shaped stalagmite. Unlike stalactites, stalagmites never start out as hollow "soda straws". Given enough time, these formations can meet and fuse to create a speleothem of calcium carbonate known as a pillar, column, or stalagnate.

=== Lava stalactites ===
Another type of stalactite is formed in lava tubes while molten and fluid lava is still active inside. The mechanism of formation is the deposition of molten dripping material on the ceilings of caves, however with lava stalactites formation happens very quickly in only a matter of hours, days, or weeks, whereas limestone stalactites may take up to thousands of years. A key difference with lava stalactites is that once the lava has ceased flowing, so too will the stalactites cease to grow. This means that if the stalactite were to be broken it would never grow back.

The generic term lavacicle has been applied to lava stalactites and stalagmites indiscriminately and evolved from the word icicle.

Like limestone stalactites, they can leave lava drips onto the floor that turn into lava stalagmites and may eventually fuse with the corresponding stalactite to form a column.

==== Shark tooth stalactites ====
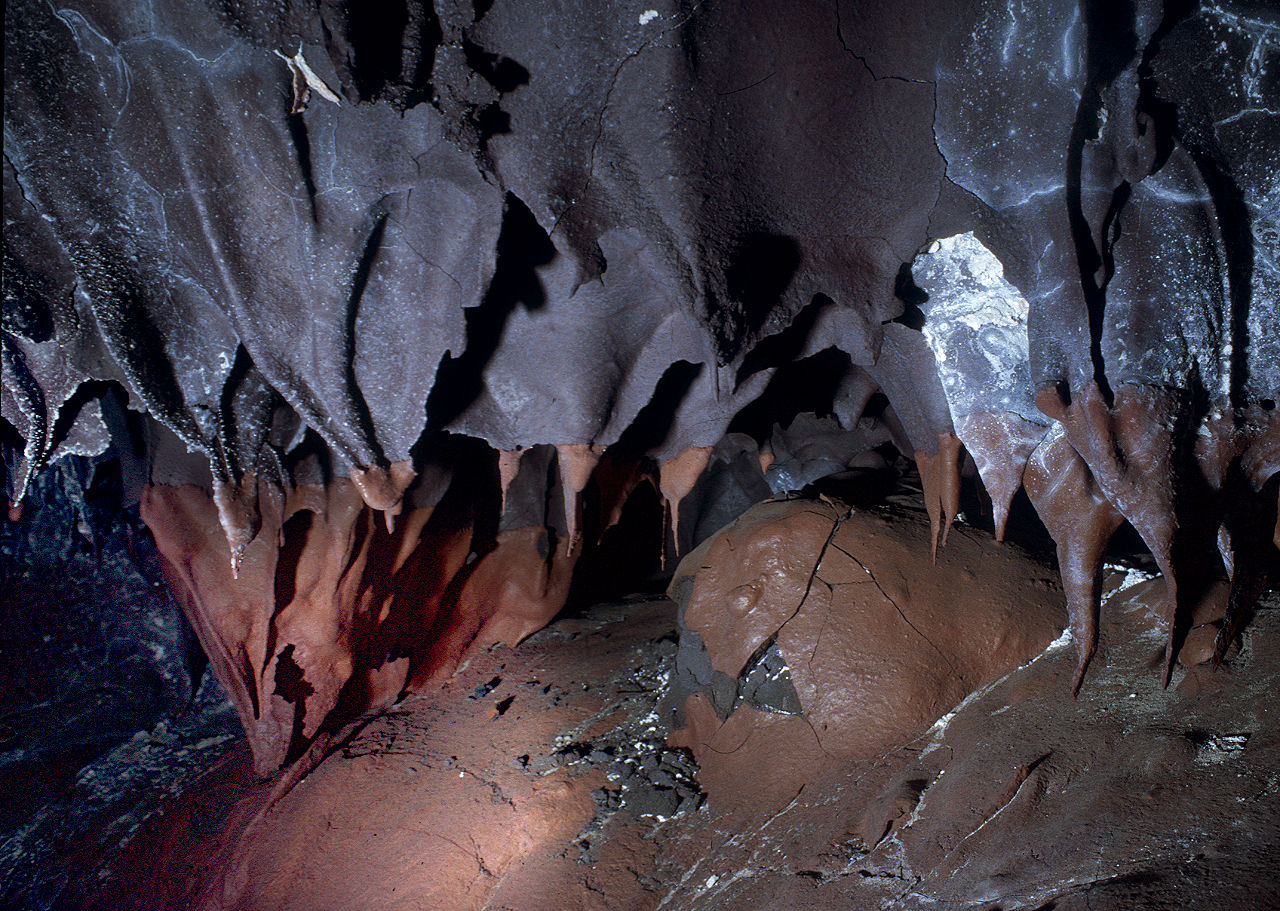
Shark tooth stalactites

The shark tooth stalactite is broad and tapering in appearance. It may begin as a small driblet of lava from a semi-solid ceiling, but then grows by accreting layers as successive flows of lava rise and fall in the lava tube, coating and recoating the stalactite with more material. They can vary from a few millimeters to over a meter in length.

==== Splash stalactites ====
As lava flows through a tube, material will be splashed up on the ceiling and ooze back down, hardening into a stalactite. This type of formation results in an irregularly-shaped stalactite, looking somewhat like stretched taffy. Often they may be of a different color than the original lava that formed the cave.

==== Tubular lava stalactites ====
When the roof of a lava tube is cooling, a skin forms that traps semi-molten material inside. Trapped gases expansion forces lava to extrude out through small openings that result in hollow, tubular stalactites analogous to the soda straws formed as depositional speleothems in solution caves. The longest known is almost 2 meters in length. These are common in Hawaiian lava tubes and are often associated with a drip stalagmite that forms below as material is carried through the tubular stalactite and piles up on the floor beneath. Sometimes the tubular form collapses near the distal end, most likely when the pressure of escaping gases decreased and still-molten portions of the stalactites deflated and cooled. Often these tubular stalactites acquire a twisted, vermiform appearance as bits of lava crystallize and force the flow in different directions. These tubular lava helictites may also be influenced by air currents through a tube and point downwind.

=== Ice stalactites ===
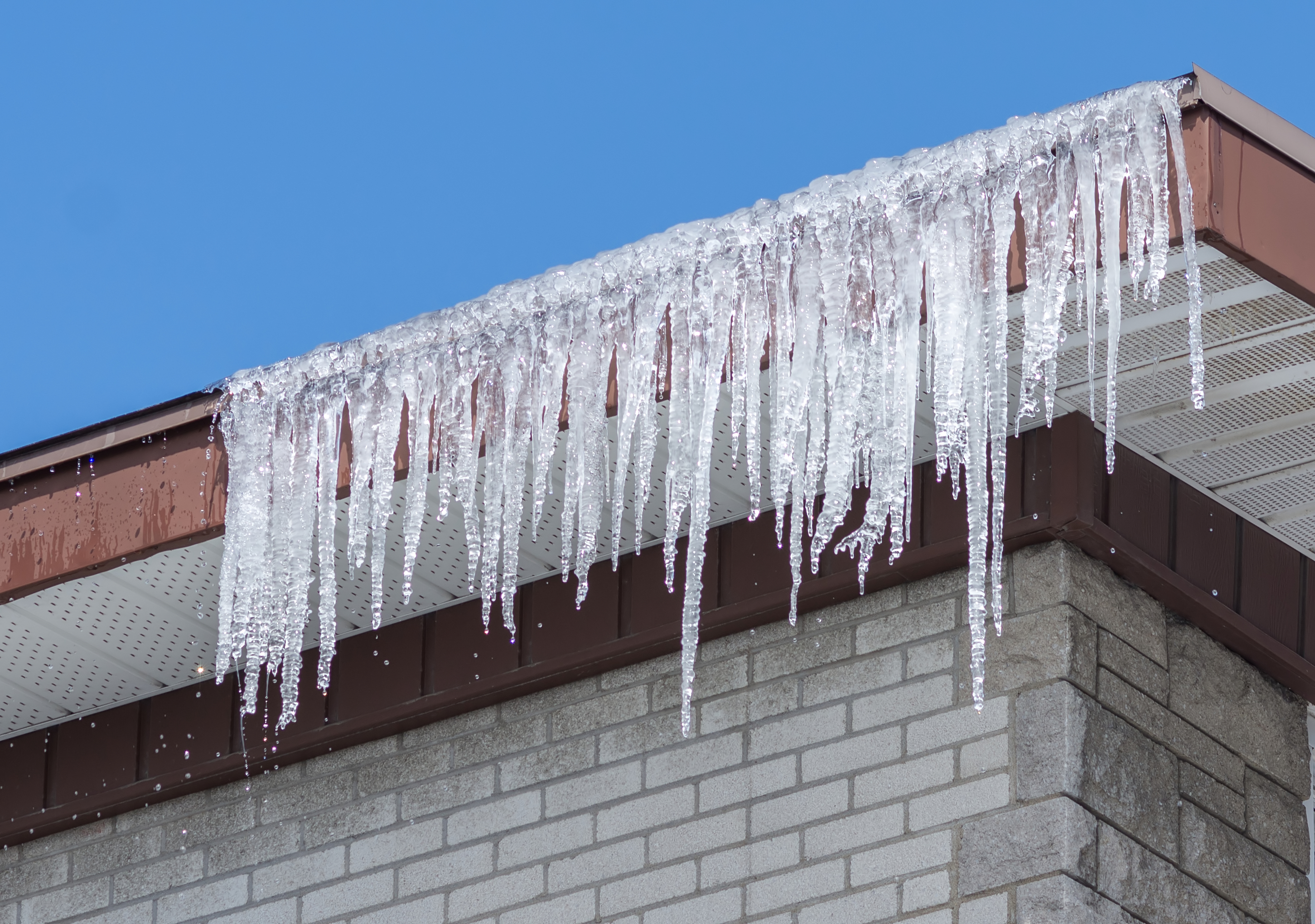
Ice stalactites on the gutter of a house

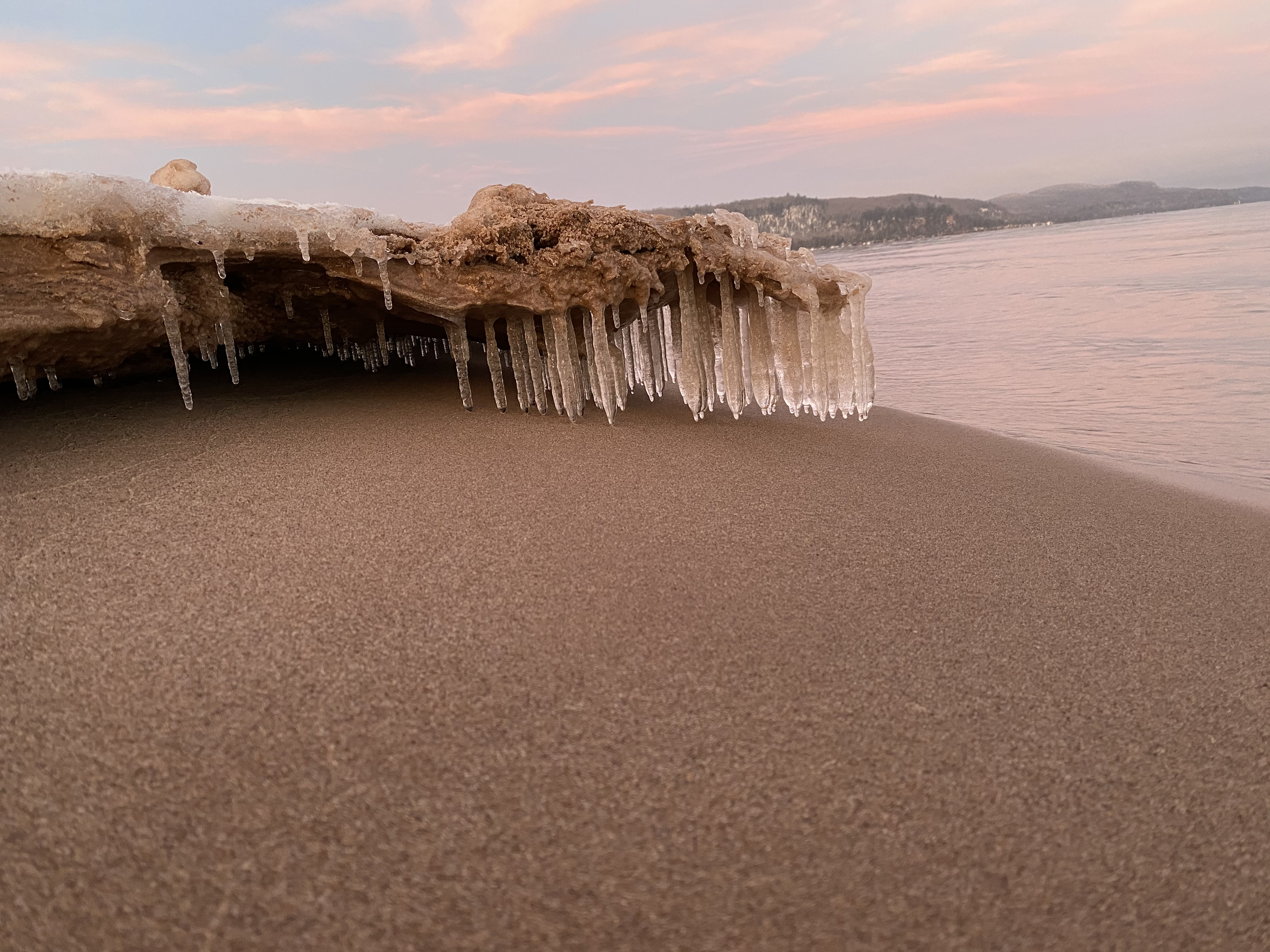
Ice stalactites on a frozen beach in Bete Grise, Michigan

A common stalactite found seasonally or year round in many caves is the ice stalactite, commonly referred to as icicles, especially on the surface. Water seepage from the surface will penetrate into a cave and if temperatures are below freezing, the water will form stalactites. They can also be formed by the freezing of water vapor. Similar to lava stalactites, ice stalactites form very quickly within hours or days. Unlike lava stalactites however, they may grow back as long as water and temperatures are suitable.

Ice stalactites can also form under sea ice when saline water is introduced to ocean water. These specific stalactites are referred to as brinicles.

Ice stalactites may also form corresponding stalagmites below them and given time may grow together to form an ice column.

=== Concrete stalactites ===
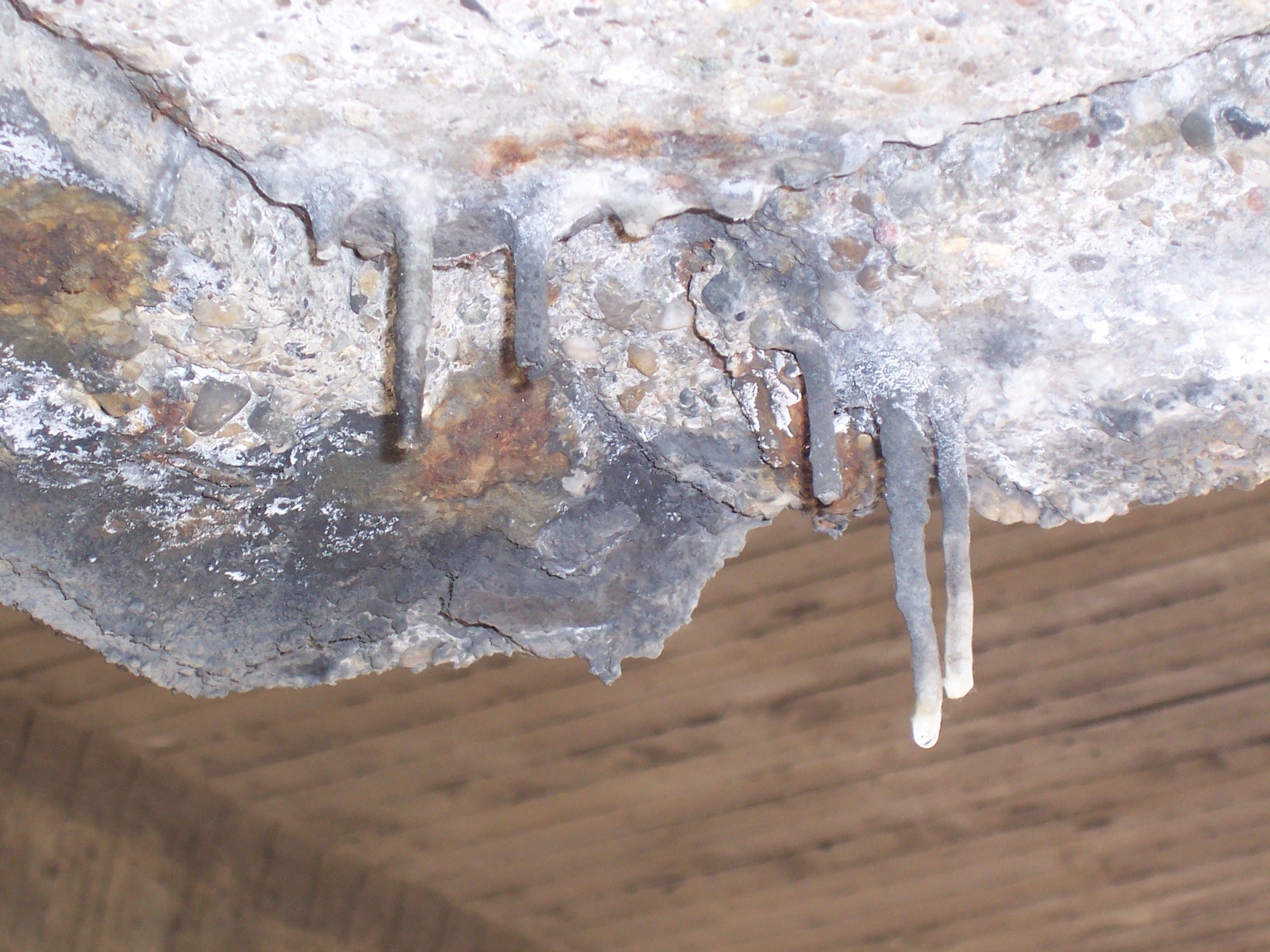
Concrete stalactites

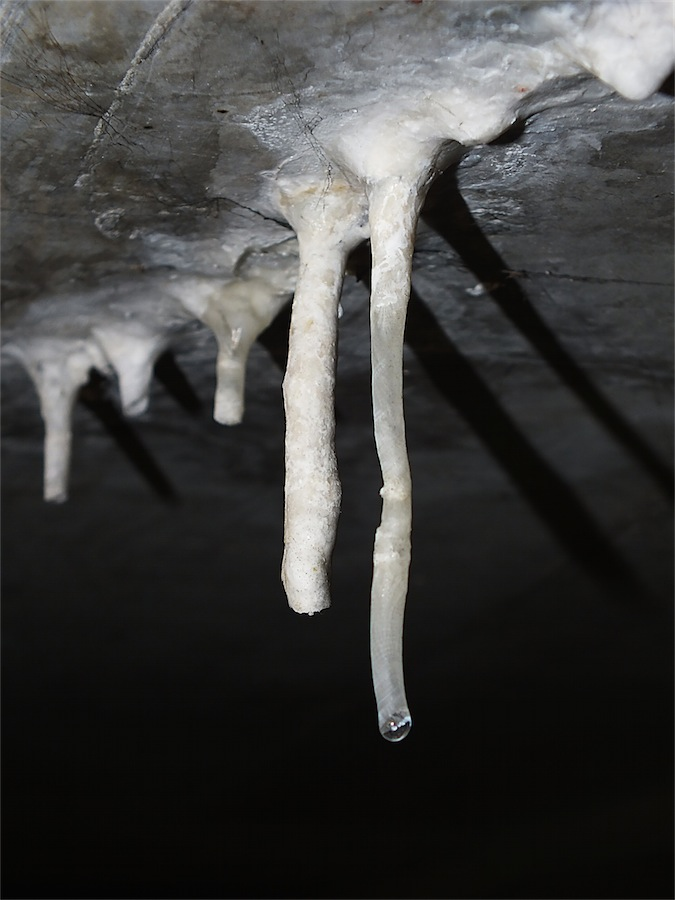
Calthemite soda straw stalactites under a concrete slab

Stalactites can also form on concrete, and on plumbing where there is a slow leak and where there are calcium, magnesium or other ions in the water supply, although they form much more rapidly there than in the natural cave environment. These secondary deposits, such as stalactites, stalagmites, flowstone and others, which are derived from the lime, mortar or other calcareous material in concrete, outside of the "cave" environment, can not be classified as "speleothems" due to the definition of the term. The term "calthemite" is used to encompass these secondary deposits which mimic the shapes and forms of speleothems outside the cave environment.

The way stalactites form on concrete is due to different chemistry than those that form naturally in limestone caves and is due to the presence of calcium oxide in cement. Concrete is made from aggregate, sand and cement. When water is added to the mix, the calcium oxide in the cement reacts with water to form calcium hydroxide (Ca(OH)_{2}). The chemical formula for this is:

CaO_{(s)} + H_{2}O_{(l)} → Ca(OH)_{2}_{(aq)}

Over time, any rainwater that penetrates cracks in set (hard) concrete will carry any free calcium hydroxide in solution to the edge of the concrete. Stalactites can form when the solution emerges on the underside of the concrete structure where it is suspended in the air, for example, on a ceiling or a beam. When the solution comes into contact with air on the underside of the concrete structure, another chemical reaction takes place. The solution reacts with carbon dioxide in the air and precipitates calcium carbonate.

Ca(OH)_{2}_{(aq)} + CO_{2}_{(g)} → CaCO_{3}_{(s)} + H_{2}O_{(l)}

When this solution drops down it leaves behind particles of calcium carbonate and over time these form into a stalactite. They are normally a few centimeters long and with a diameter of approximately 4 to 5 mm (0.16 to 0.20 inches). The growth rate of stalactites is significantly influenced by supply continuity of Ca^{2+} saturated solution and the drip rate. A straw shaped stalactite which has formed under a concrete structure can grow as much as 2 mm per day in length, when the drip rate is approximately 11 minutes between drops. Changes in leachate solution pH can facilitate additional chemical reactions, which may also influence calthemite stalactite growth rates.

== Records ==
The White Chamber in the Jeita Grotto's upper cavern in Lebanon contains an 8.2 m (27 ft) limestone stalactite which is accessible to visitors and is claimed to be the longest stalactite in the world. Another such claim is made for a 20 m (66 ft) limestone stalactite that hangs in the Chamber of Rarities in the Gruta Rei do Mato (Sete Lagoas, Minas Gerais, Brazil). However, cavers have often encountered longer stalactites during their explorations. One of the longest stalactites viewable by the general public is in Pol an Ionain (Doolin Cave), County Clare, Ireland, in a karst region known as The Burren; what makes it more impressive is the fact that the stalactite is held on by a section of calcite less than 0.3 m^{2} (3.2 sq ft).

== Etymology ==
Stalactites are first mentioned (though not by name) by the Roman natural historian Pliny in a text which also mentions stalagmites and columns and refers to their formation by the dripping of water. The term "stalactite" was coined in the 17th century by the Danish Physician Ole Worm, who coined the word from the Greek word σταλακτός (stalaktos, "dripping") and the Greek suffix -ίτης (-ites, connected with or belonging to).

== Photo gallery ==
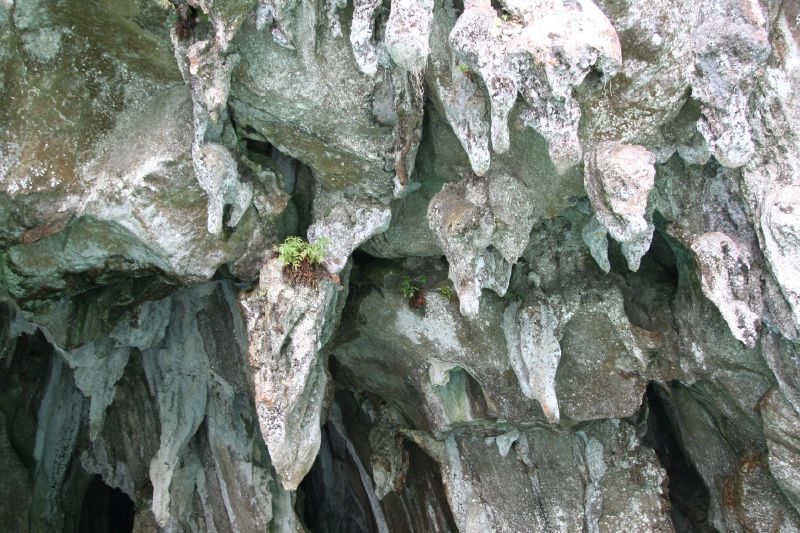
Stalactites at the Puerto Princesa Underground River, Palawan, Philippines

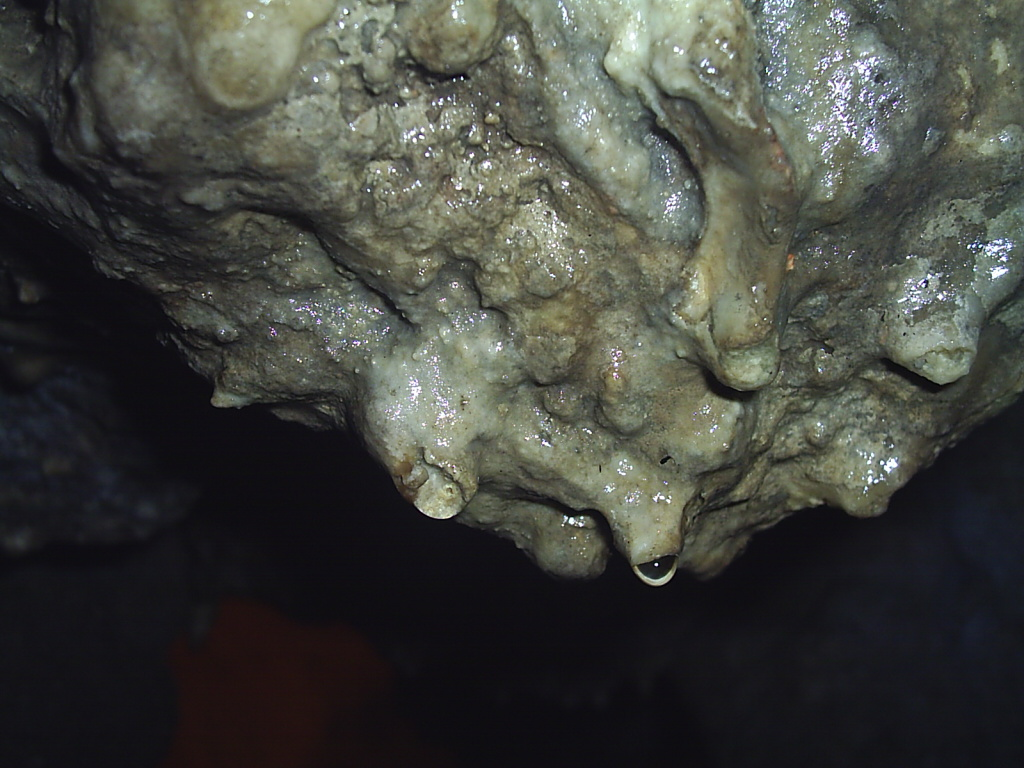
Mineralized water drop forming at bottom of stalactites

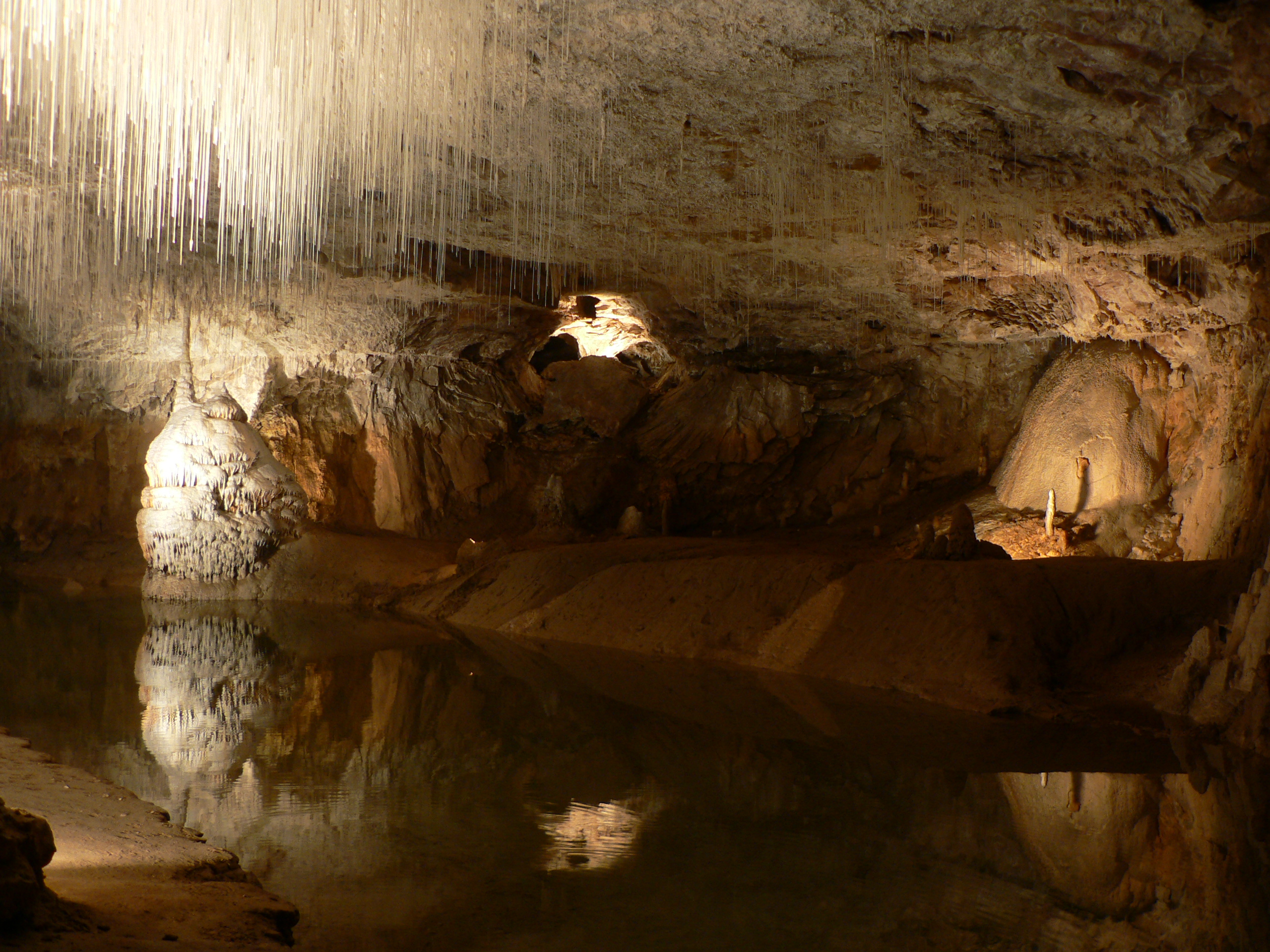
Stalactites of the type called "soda straws" from the Choranche caves in the Vercors, France

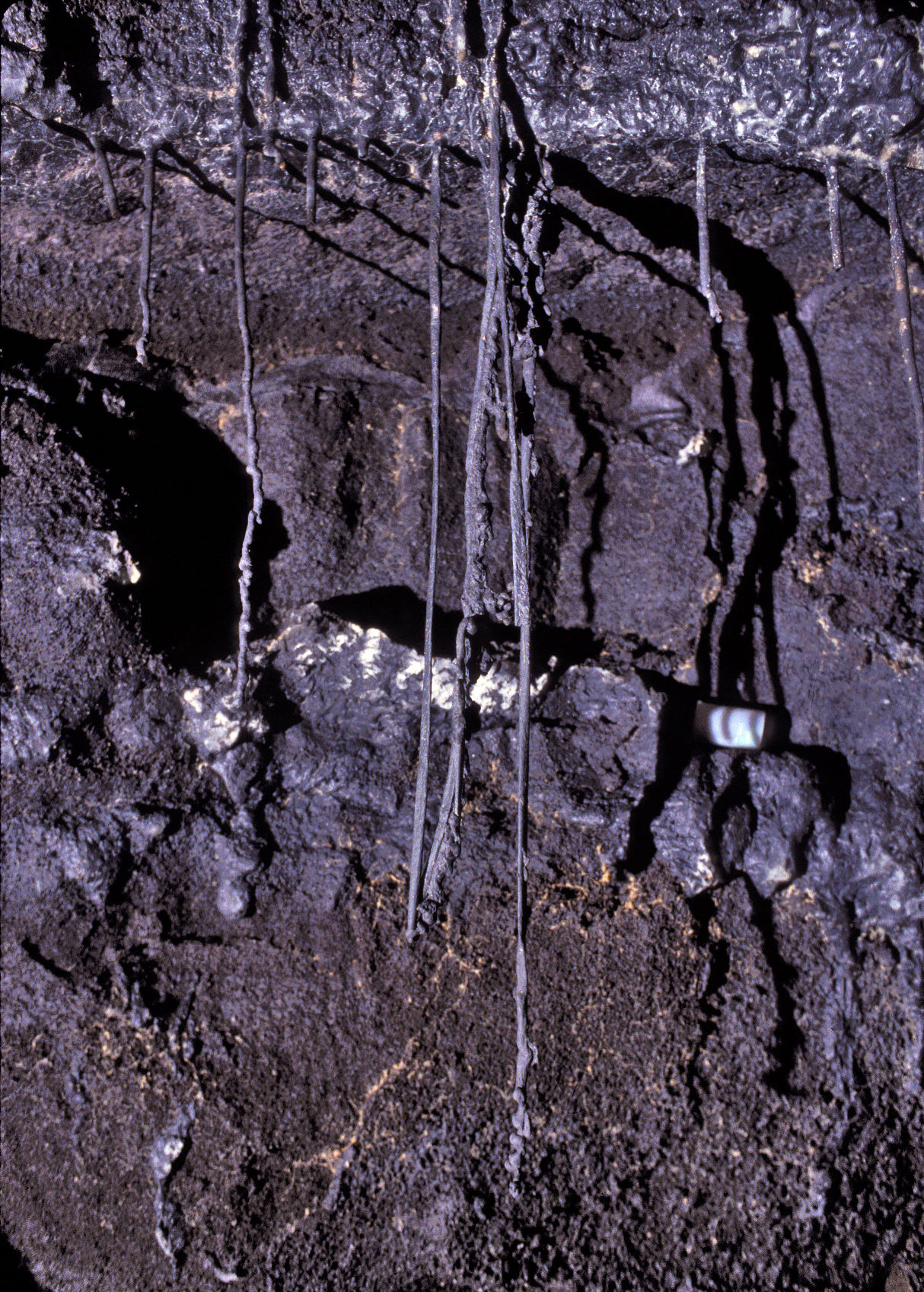
Tubular lava stalactites

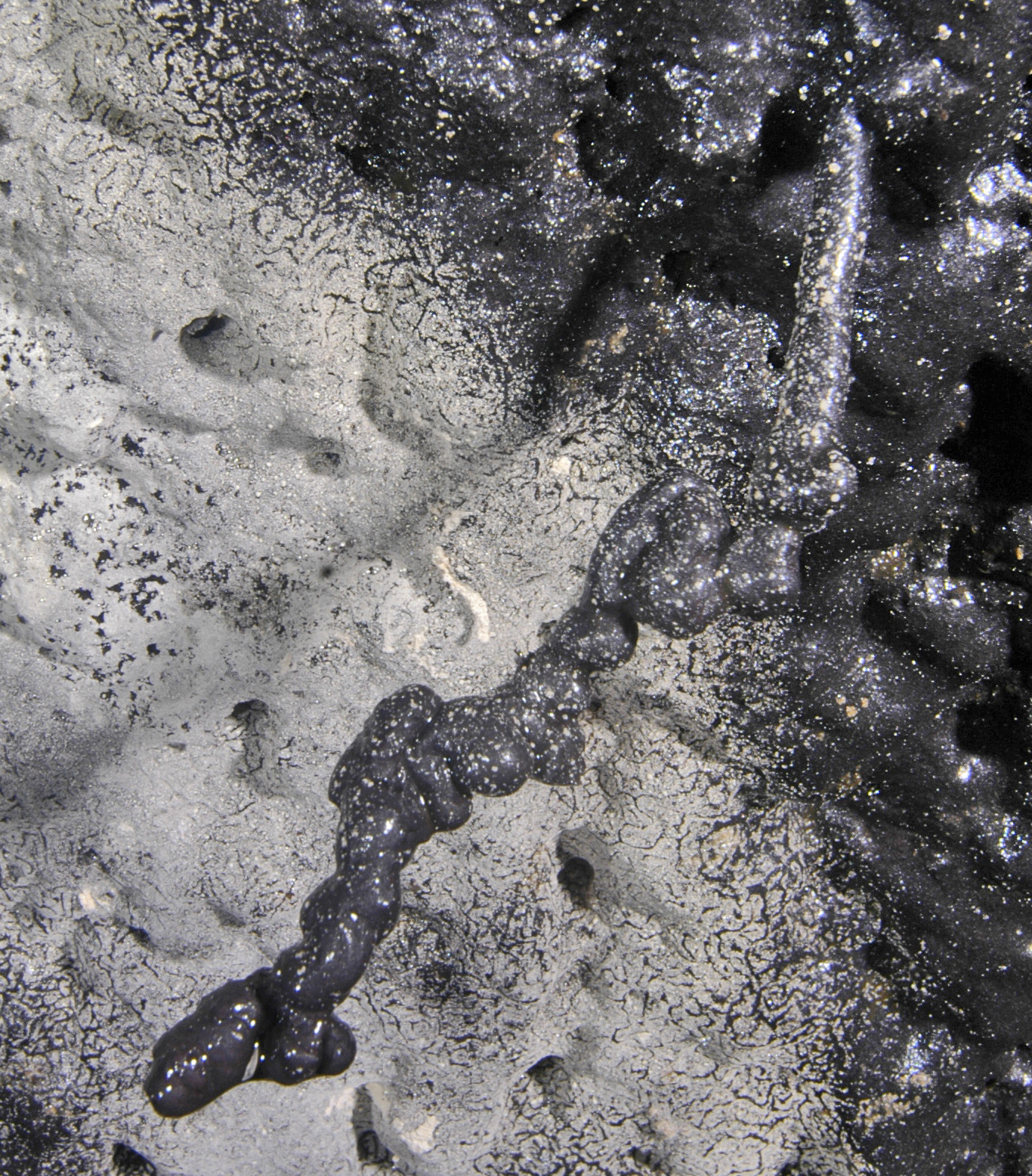
A tubular lava helictite

== See also ==
- Stalagmite
- Lavacicle
- Rusticle
- Karst
- Icicle
- Bottlebrush - Stalactite coated with pool spar.
- Brinicle
