= Labill =

Labill may refer to:

- Joseph S. Labill (1837–1911), Union Army Medal of Honor recipient
- Labill., taxonomic author abbreviation of Jacques Labillardière (1755–1834), French biologist

== See also ==
- Labille, a surname
