= Little Gratiot River =

River in the Upper Peninsula of Michigan

- Location within Michigan Location within the United States

Location
- Country: United States
- State: Michigan

Physical characteristics
- Source: Lake Gratiot
  - coordinates: 47.3624145°N 88.1037186°W
- Mouth: Lac La Belle
  - location: Lac La Belle
  - coordinates: 47.3760230°N 88.0312191°W
  - elevation: 604 ft (184 m)
- Length: 11.2 miles (18.0 km)

The Little Gratiot River is an 11.2-mile-long (18.0 km) river in Keweenaw County on the Upper Peninsula of Michigan in the United States. It flows from Lake Gratiot into Lac La Belle, which connects with Lake Superior.

== See also ==
- List of rivers of Michigan
