= Ice spike =

Upward projection of ice from surface of frozen water body

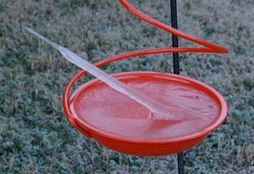
Classic spike form

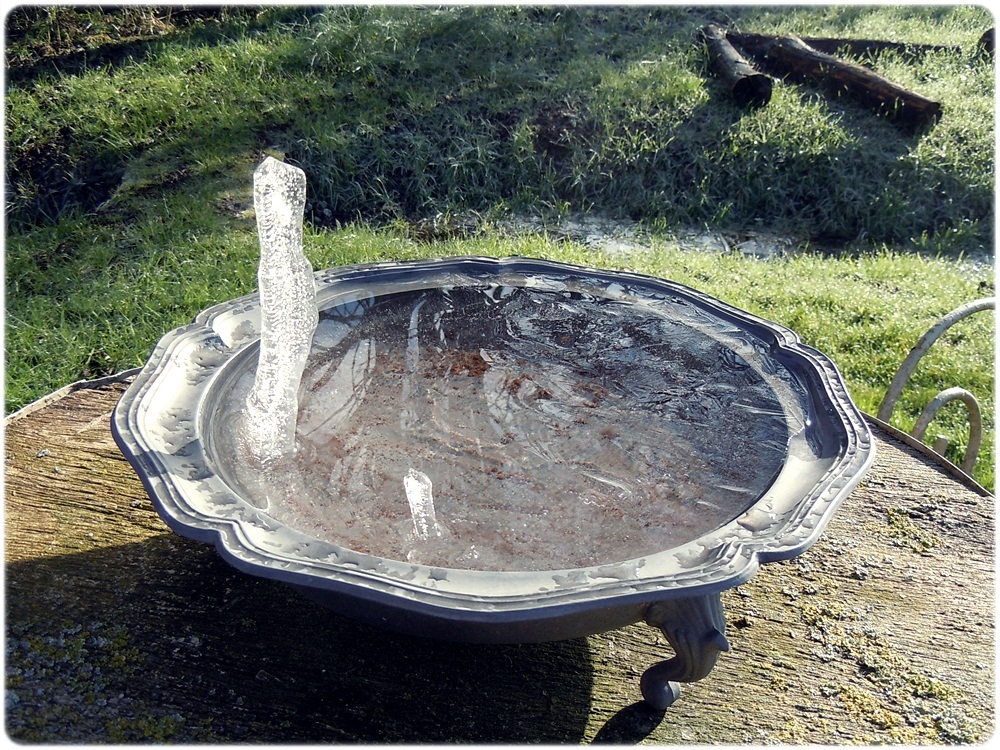
Ice candle form

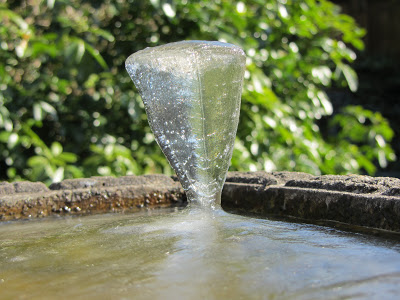
Inverted pyramid form

An ice spike is an ice formation, often in the shape of an inverted icicle, that projects upwards from the surface of a body of frozen water.

Ice spikes created by natural processes on the surface of small bodies of frozen water have been reported for many decades, although their occurrence is quite rare. A mechanism for their formation, now known as the Bally–Dorsey model, was proposed in the early 20th century but this was not tested in the laboratory for many years. As of 2013, a number of photographs of natural ice spikes have appeared on the Internet as well as methods of producing them artificially by freezing distilled water in domestic refrigerators or freezers. This has allowed a small number of scientists to test the hypothesis in a laboratory setting and, although the experiments appear to confirm the validity of the Bally–Dorsey model, they have raised further questions about how natural ice spikes form, and more work remains to be done before the phenomenon is fully understood.

Natural ice spikes can grow into shapes other than a classic spike shape, and have been variously reported as ice candles, ice towers or ice vases as there is no standard nomenclature for these other forms. One particularly unusual form takes the shape of an inverted pyramid.

Although natural ice spikes are usually measured in centimeters or inches, a report that appeared in the Harbor Creek Historical Society Newsletter by Canadian Gene Heuser, who hiked across frozen Lake Erie in 1963, spoke of "small pinholes in the ice through which the water below was periodically forced under pressure to spout up into the air and freeze" producing five-foot-high (1.5 m) "frozen spurts that looked to him like telephone poles standing straight up all over the lake".

== Background ==
Ice spikes have been reported as a rare natural phenomenon for decades. A model of the mechanism of formation was put forth independently by O. Bally and H.E. Dorsey in the early 20th century and this is still the most widely accepted explanation of the phenomenon today. Spikes tend to form in containers such as bird baths and pet drinking bowls, where the water freezes quickly, rather than in large bodies of water such as lakes and ponds. A number of web pages displaying photographs of unusual ice formations and discussing the phenomenon have been published, and a number of cases of ice spikes being formed on ice cubes in domestic refrigerators have been reported. The ability to grow ice spikes in a controlled environment has prompted a small number of investigations by the researchers in the Physics Department of the California Institute of Technology under the direction of Kenneth G. Libbrecht into the conditions needed for the spikes to form.

== Mechanism of formation ==
Water expands by 9% as it freezes. Occasionally the surface can freeze over except for a small hole; the continuing freezing and expansion of water that is below the surface ice then slowly pushes the remaining water up through the hole. Reaching very cold air, the edge of the extruded water freezes while remaining liquid in the center. More freezing below pushes more water up, the edge freezes, and so on. If the rate of extrusion of water is the same as the rate of freezing at the lip of the hole, then this process is continually repeated and successive layers form an upward-growing tube of ice. As with snowflakes, the shape of the tube is controlled by the molecular nature of water. The simplest shape of an ice crystal that reflects its internal structure is a hexagonal prism. The top and bottom faces of the crystal are hexagonal planes called basal planes and the direction that is perpendicular to the basal planes is called the c-axis.

The process begins when surface water nucleates around irregularities where it meets the container wall. If the c-axis of the first crystal to form is not vertical, the basal plane intersects the surface along a line perpendicular to the c-axis and ice needles tend to propagate across the surface along this line. Simply put, the surface freezes from the edges inward, so that only a small surface hole remains unfrozen. The crystallite curtains tend to join at an angle of 60 degrees and so the hole is often triangular. The formation of ice spikes is related to the shape of the water body, the concentration of dissolved impurities, air temperature and circulation above the water. Spikes that grow from a crystallite formed below the surface of the water may project from the ice sheet at a steep angle, rather than perpendicular to it. The ice spike process is rare - more commonly the surface freezes over entirely, and as water under the surface freezes it pushes all of the surface ice upward.

Three ice spikes growing in the freezing compartment of a domestic refrigerator

Small ice spikes can be formed artificially on ice cubes produced in domestic refrigerators; using distilled water in plastic ice cube trays. The formation of the spike is similar to that of the naturally occurring spike in that the expansion of interior water and, the reduction of volume in the interior of the cube, increase the pressure on the water pushing it upward through the hole. The growth of the tube ceases when the drop at the top of the tube freezes entirely, which is substantially before the rest of the water in the cube is frozen. This method produces small spikes which are usually round or triangular in cross section with sharp tips. Experiments using this method have been carried out in laboratory settings but it has been found that spikes are less likely to form in ice cubes made from non-distilled water as impurities in the water inhibit spike formation. (Note: Libbrecht, the main investigator of this phenomenon, admits that he is unable to explain why spikes grow readily on ice cubes made with some tap waters.) This poses the question of how naturally occurring ice spikes form in tapwater, rainwater, or other such sources of water, despite the impurities present inside the water, which should impede ice growth. Research by Libbrecht and Lui has suggested that, in the case of the small spikes grown in a refrigerator, impurities become increasingly concentrated in the small unfrozen droplet at the top of the tube reducing the freezing rate and slowing the growth of the tube. However, they believe that on the rare occasions when exceptionally large spikes grow in natural, outdoor ice formations, some other mechanism must remove the impurities that build up at the top of the growing tube. Either impurities are forced into pockets that freeze more slowly, or perhaps a convective flow, which would be insignificant in the smaller, artificially grown spikes, replaces the water at the top of the tube with fresh water from below.

The results of the work carried out at Caltech have suggested experiments that might further elucidate this phenomenon.

== See also ==
- Candle ice
- Crystal growth
- Icicle
- Penitente (snow formation)
