= Bete Grise, Michigan =

Bete Grise Bagidawewining-wiikwed (Ojibwe)
- Unincorporated Community
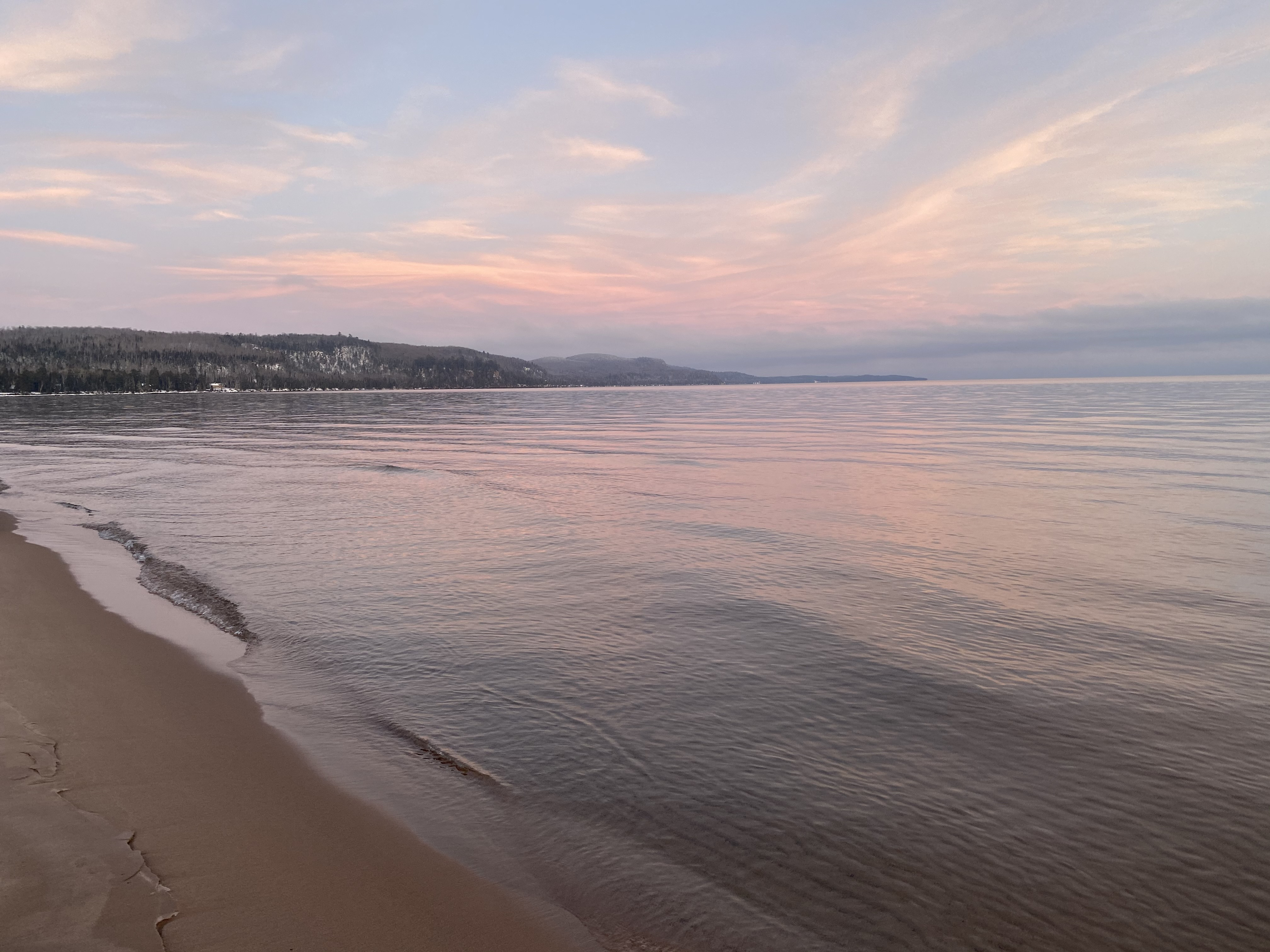
- Bete Grise shoreline
- Etymology: Grey Beast (French) At the net setting bay (Ojibwe)
- Location within Michigan Location within the United States
- Coordinates: 47.3887984°N 87.9551091°W
- Country: United States
- State: Michigan
- County: Keweenaw
- Township: Grant
- Elevation: 623 ft (190 m)
- Time zone: UTC-5 (Eastern (EST))
  - Summer (DST): UTC-4 (EDT)
- Zip Code: 49950
- Area code: 906

Bete Grise is an unincorporated community in Grant Township, Keweenaw County, Michigan. The community lies on the shore of Lake Superior. The community is located on the north side of Bete Grise Bay. The Mendota Canal cuts the bay in half, which allows travel from Lac La Belle to Lake Superior. There is a white sand beach nearly 1 mile (1.6 km) long on either side of the canal. Most of the beach is public land, with the Bete Grise Nature Preserve occupying the land south of the canal.

The Mendota Light is south of the community, which provided navigation aid to the canal.
