= Bete Grise =

Unincorporated place in Michigan, United States

Coordinates: 47.38864°N 87.95661°W

Bete Grise (from the French Bête grise, "gray beast") is the name given to an unincorporated place, a bay on Lake Superior, a county-owned public beach on that bay, a nearby lighthouse, and two neighboring nature preserves in Michigan. Located in Grant Township in Keweenaw County in Michigan's Upper Peninsula, local legend holds that the sand of the beach "sings."

== Local legend ==
Local legend says that the musical "voice" that emanates from the sand is that of a Native American maid who lost her lover to the Great Lakes and still calls to him from the shore with the aid of visitors who "play" the sand. The sand can be made to "sing" by pressing down with the palm of the hand or "bark" when struck. The sand supposedly loses its musical properties when removed from the beach.

It is said that the beach was named due to sightings of a strange gray creature that roamed the area. Another local legend is that when the Native Americans burned off the blueberry bogs next to Bete Gris after the harvest, the smoke rolling across the bay looked like a gray beast.

== Geography and location ==
The community of Bete Grise, once a bustling location during the copper mining days complete with school, church and general store, is now home to approximately a dozen-and-a-half residences lining Bete Grise Bay.

Bete Grise Beach is located off US Highway 41, on a peninsula between the inland lake Lac La Belle and Lake Superior, on the Keweenaw Peninsula of the Upper Peninsula of Michigan. The northern half of the beach is easily accessible by paved road. The southern half of the beach, Bete Grise South, is most easily reached by boat and is part of two designated nature preserves: the Bete Grise Nature Preserve and the Bete Grise Wetlands Nature Preserve. The beach is bisected by the dredged Mendota Ship Canal. The historic Bete Grise (Mendota) Light is restored and in private hands on Bete Gris South.

The Houghton–Keweenaw Conservation District's Bete Grise Preserve is 5,000 acres (2,000 ha) of "diverse wetland types", including shoreline stretching for more than 5.5 miles (8.9 km) along Lake Superior. It is a designated nature protected area which lies between Oliver Bay along Gay–Lac La Belle Road to Bete Grise. The Nature Conservancy owns the Bete Grise Wetlands Preserve, consisting of a 62-acre (25 ha) strip of land immediately adjacent to the Mendota Ship Canal.

Bete Grise Bay is also a designated harbor of refuge on Lake Superior by the US Coast Guard.
