= Icicle =

Spike of ice formed by water dripping and freezing

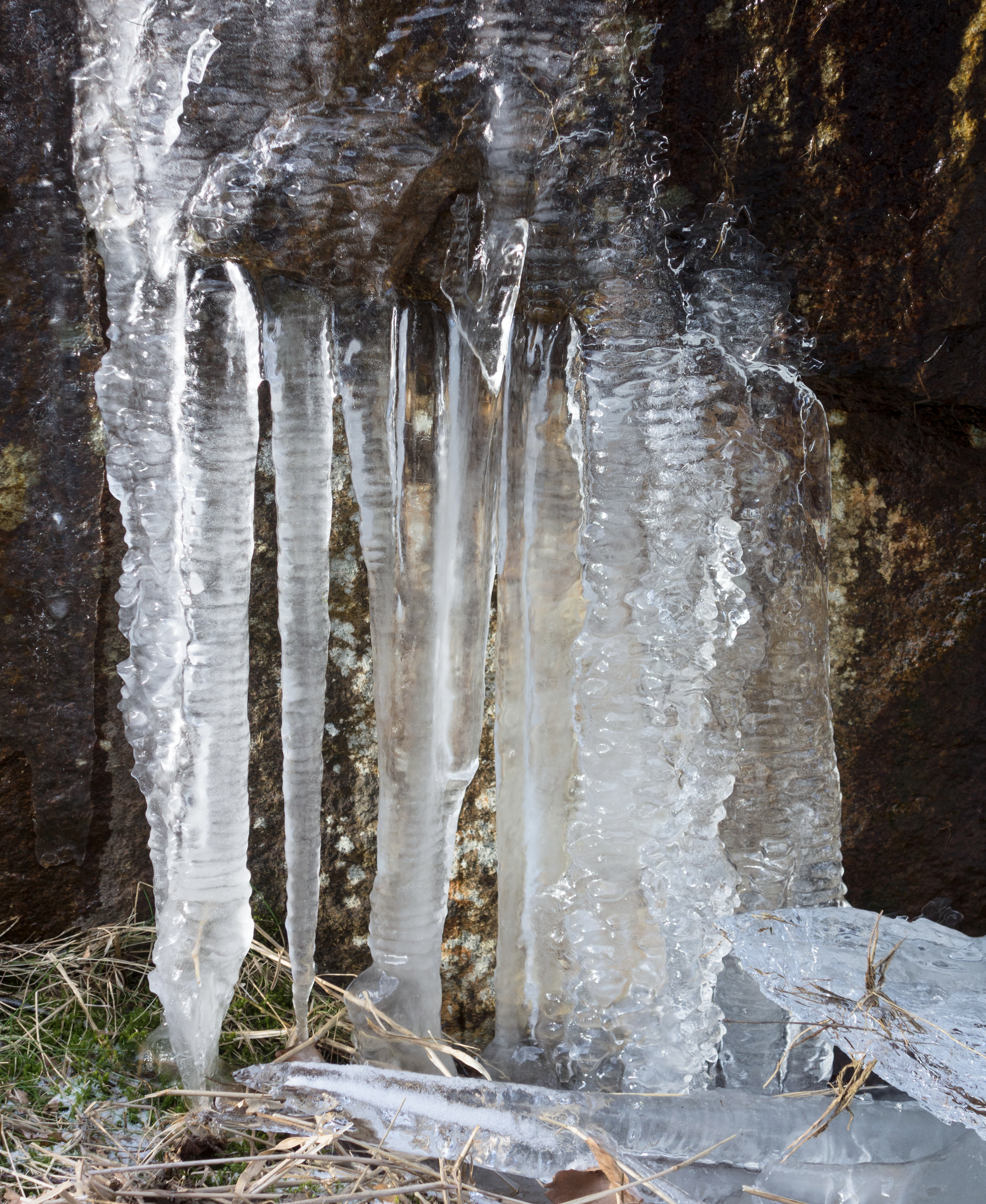
Icicles – the "growth rings" or banding on the icicles occurs as the water in the soil above the cliff thaws during the day and freezes during the night.

An icicle is a spike of ice formed when water falling from an object freezes.

== Formation and dynamics ==
Icicles can form during bright, sunny, but subfreezing weather, when ice or snow melted by sunlight or some other heat source (such as a poorly insulated building), refreezes as it drips off under exposed conditions. Over time continued water runoff will cause the icicle to grow. Another set of conditions is during ice storms, when rain falling in air slightly below freezing slowly accumulates as numerous small icicles hanging from twigs, leaves, wires, etc. Thirdly, icicles can form wherever water seeps out of or drips off vertical surfaces such as road cuts or cliffs. Under some conditions these can slowly form the "frozen waterfalls" favored by ice climbers.

Icicles form on surfaces which might have a smooth and straight, or irregular shape, which in turn influences the shape of an icicle. Another influence is melting water, which might flow toward the icicle in a straight line or which might flow from several directions. Impurities in the water can lead to ripples on the surface of the icicles.

Icicles elongate by the growth of ice as a tube into the pendant drop. The wall of this ice tube is about 0.1 mm (0.004 in) and the width 5 mm (0.2 in). As a result of this growth process, the interior of a growing icicle is liquid water. The growth of an icicle both in length and in width can be calculated and is a complicated function of air temperature, wind speed, and the water flux into the icicle. The growth rate in length typically varies with time, and can in ideal conditions be more than 1 cm (0.39 in) per minute.

Given the right conditions, icicles may also form in caves (in which case they are also known as ice stalactites). They can also form within salty water (brine) sinking from sea ice. These so-called brinicles can kill sea urchins and starfish, which was observed by BBC film crews near Mount Erebus, Antarctica.

== Dangers ==
Icicles can pose personal and structural dangers. Icicles that hang from an object may fall and cause injury and/or damage to whoever or whatever is below them. In addition, ice deposits can be heavy. If enough icicles form on an object, such as a wire, beam, or pole, the weight of the ice can severely damage the structural integrity of the object and may cause the object to break. This can also happen with roofs, where failure can damage nearby parked vehicles or the contents and occupants of the structure. Icicles on roofs can also be associated with ice dams, which can cause water damage as the water penetrates below the shingles.

The story of an English youth killed by a falling icicle in 1776 has often been recounted.

Icicles are often used as weapons by children engaging in play, which can potentially lead to sharp force injury. A 2022 study showed that icicles could be used to penetrate most of the human body with enough depth to be able to compromise vital organs, with the practical exception of the chest region.

Large icicles that form on cliffs near highways have been known to fall and damage motor vehicles.

In 2010, five people were killed and 150 injured by icicles in Saint Petersburg, Russia after heavy snow that also caused apartment block roofs to collapse, as well as creating water damage to private homes and to the National Library of Russia.

== See also ==
- Brinicle
- Ice spike
- Rusticle
