= LaBelle, Nova Scotia =

Community in Nova Scotia, Canada

Coordinates: 44°18′42.96″N 64°50′2.76″W

LaBelle in Nova Scotia

LaBelle is a community in the Canadian province of Nova Scotia, located in Queens County.
