= Labille =

Labille is a surname. Notable people with the surname include:

- Adélaïde Labille-Guiard (1749–1803), French miniaturist and portrait painter
- Daniel Labille (1932–2022), French Roman Catholic prelate
- Grégory Labille (born 1968), French politician
- Jean-Pascal Labille (born 1961), Belgian politician

== See also ==
- Labelle
- Labill (disambiguation)
