= Labelle County, Quebec =

Former counties of Quebec

Coordinates: 46°30′N 75°10′W

Labelle County is a historic county in western Quebec, Canada. Its county seat was Mont-Laurier, Quebec. It was bounded on the west by Gatineau County, on the northeast by Montcalm County, and on the south by Papineau County. In the early 1980s when Quebec's counties were abolished, most of Labelle County was transferred to Antoine-Labelle Regional County Municipality. The southeastern part was transferred to Les Laurentides Regional County Municipality.
