= La Belle Township, Lewis County, Missouri =

Inactive township in the US state of Missouri

Coordinates: 40.1014°N 91.8692°W

La Belle Township is an inactive township in Lewis County, in the U.S. state of Missouri.

La Belle Township was established in 1866, and named after the community of La Belle, Missouri.
