= Lac La Belle, Michigan =

Lake in the state of Michigan, United States

- Unincorporated community
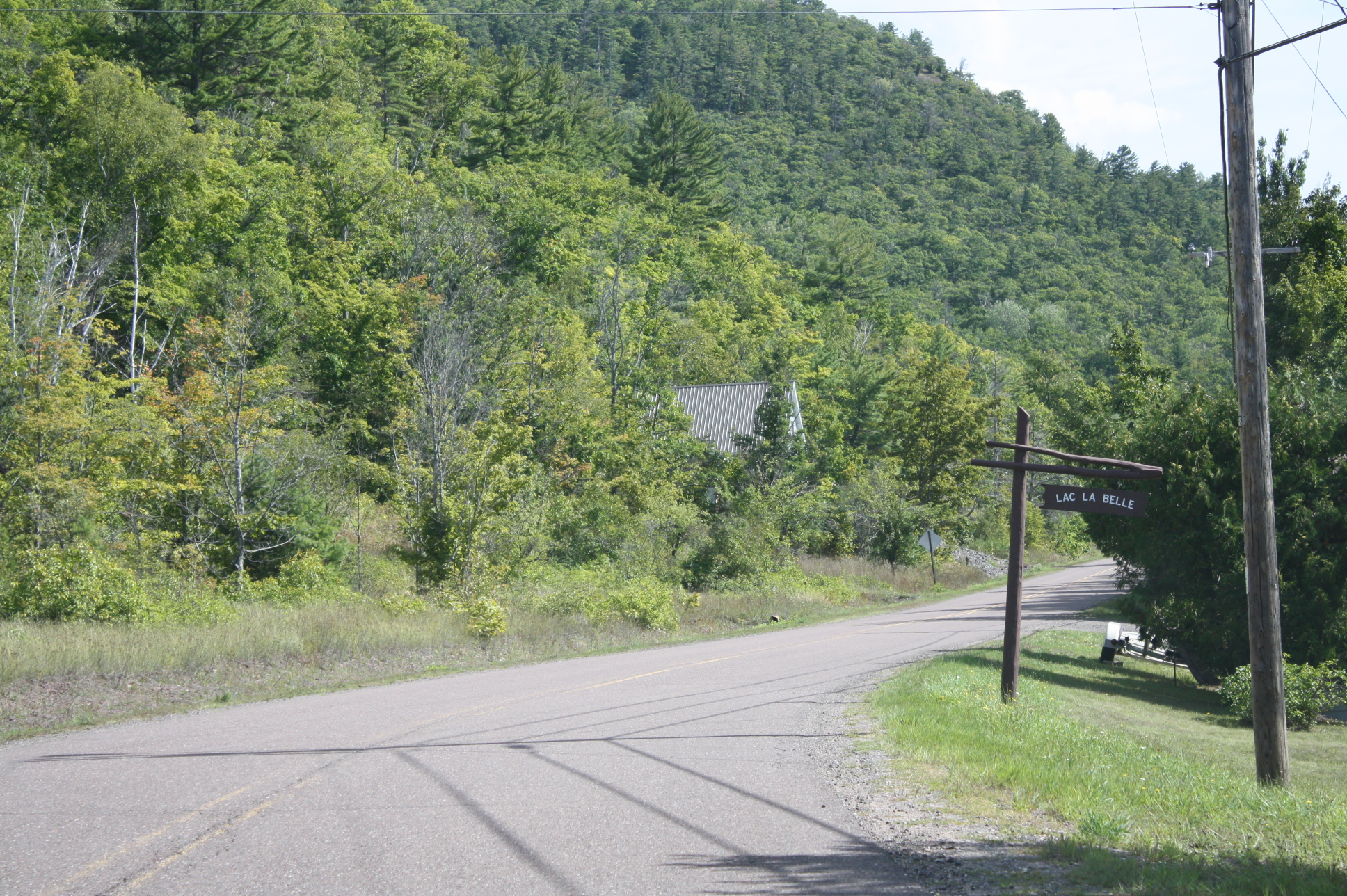
- Signage for Lac La Belle

- Location within the state of Michigan Lac La Belle (the United States)
- Coordinates: 47°22′27″N 087°59′08″W
- Country: United States
- State: Michigan
- County: Keweenaw
- Township: Grant
- Elevation: 610 ft (190 m)
- Time zone: UTC-5 (Eastern (EST))
  - Summer (DST): UTC-4 (EDT)
- ZIP code(s): 49950 (Mohawk)
- Area code: 906
- GNIS feature ID: 629926

Lac La Belle (/ˈlæk ləˈbɛl/ LACK lə-BELL; French: "Lake The Beautiful") is a small unincorporated community in Keweenaw County in the U.S. state of Michigan. The town was originally the site of a stamping plant for the copper mines of the Keweenaw, specifically the Mendota Mine and the Delaware Mine. Copper-bearing rock was transported from the mines to the stamping plant, where it was processed and loaded onto freighters.

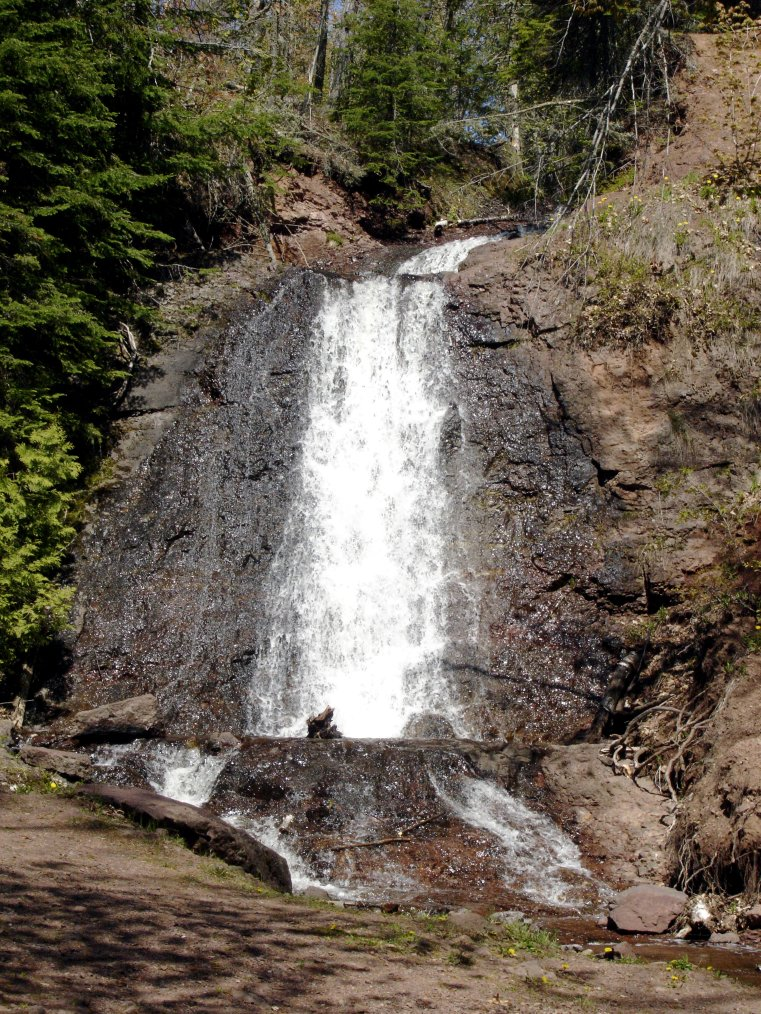
Haven Falls, on Haven Creek in the town of Lac La Belle

The nearby lake of the same name is a typical "Canadian Shield"-type lake averaging approximately 30 feet (9.1 m) and empties into Lake Superior at Bete Gris, by way of both a natural channel and a dredged canal. The canal was dredged in the 1860s with funding from several copper mining companies, for use by lake freighters, carrying copper ore.

The lake contains northern pike, walleye, smallmouth bass, perch, bluegill, sunfish, rock bass, carp and an occasional muskie.

The Little Gratiot River and several creeks empty into Lac La Belle. A small roadside park within the town contains Haven Falls on Haven Creek, which also empties into the lake.

Lac La Belle has an active summer tourist industry, with many summer cottages and resorts. The area has many dense forests and small mountains. There are backwoods outfitters who guide hikers through these areas. In the winter, the nearby Mount Bohemia attracts skiers and snowboarders.

== See also ==
- List of lakes in Michigan
