= Lac La Belle (Michigan) =

Lake in Keweenaw County, Michigan, United States

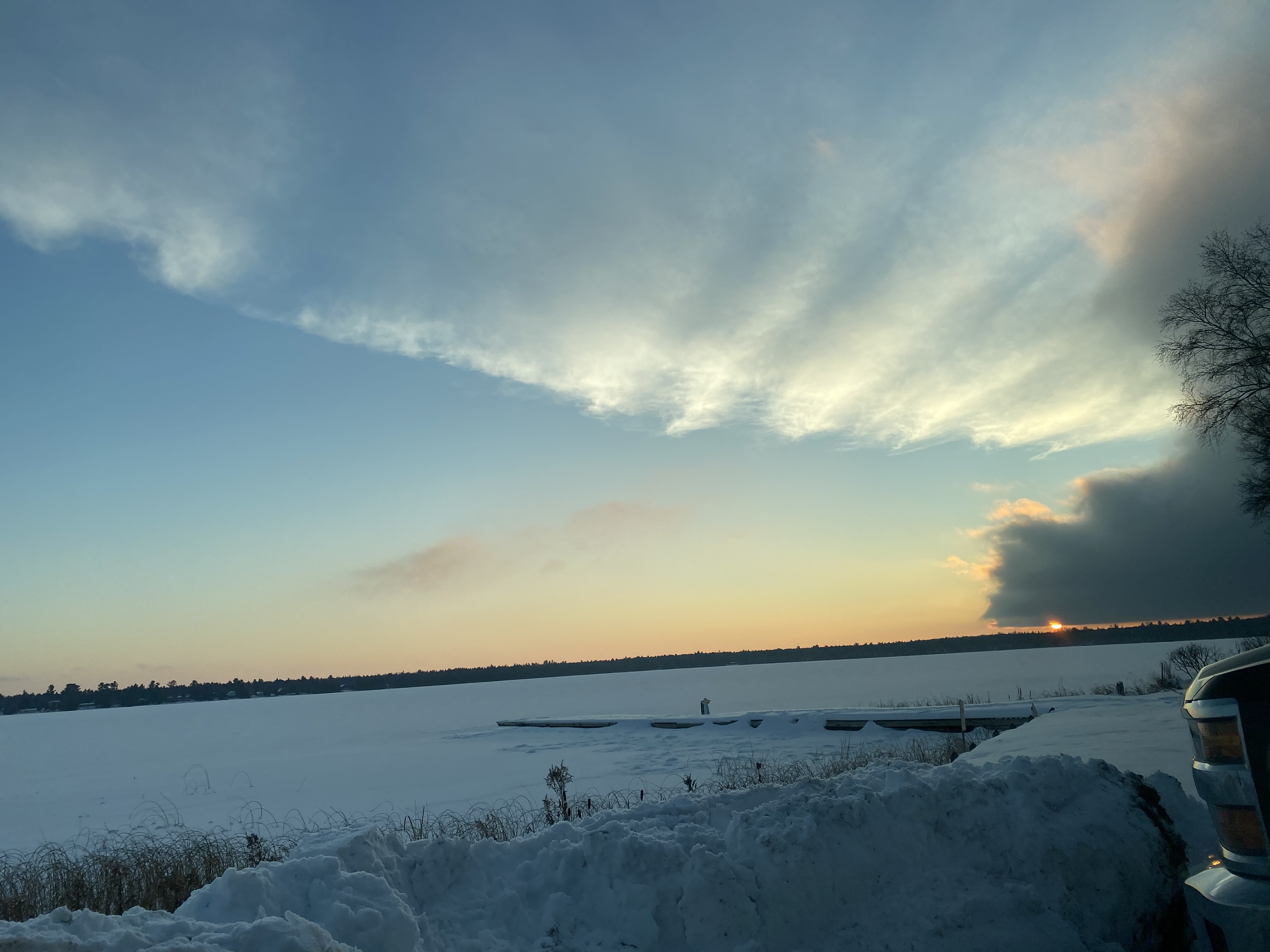
- Frozen Lac La Belle in January 2021.

- Location within Michigan Location within the United States
- Location: Grant Township, Keweenaw County, Michigan
- Coordinates: 47.3748894°N 88.0081873°W
- Primary inflows: Little Gratiot River, Haven Creek
- Primary outflows: Mendota Canal
- Surface area: 1,146 acres (464 ha)
- Max. depth: 38 feet (12 m)
- Surface elevation: 600 feet (180 m)
- Settlements: Lac La Belle

Lac La Belle (/ˈlæk ləˈbɛl/ LACK lə-BELL; French: "Lake The Beautiful") is a 1,146-acre (464 ha) lake in Grant Township, Keweenaw County, Michigan. The lake is surrounded by dense forest cover of the Keweenaw Peninsula. The bottom is mainly mud and it has a maximum depth of 38 feet (12 m). The Little Gratiot River flows into the lake on the west shore and the lake empties through the Mendota Canal into Lake Superior. There is a state owned boat launch on the north side of the lake near the community of Lac La Belle.

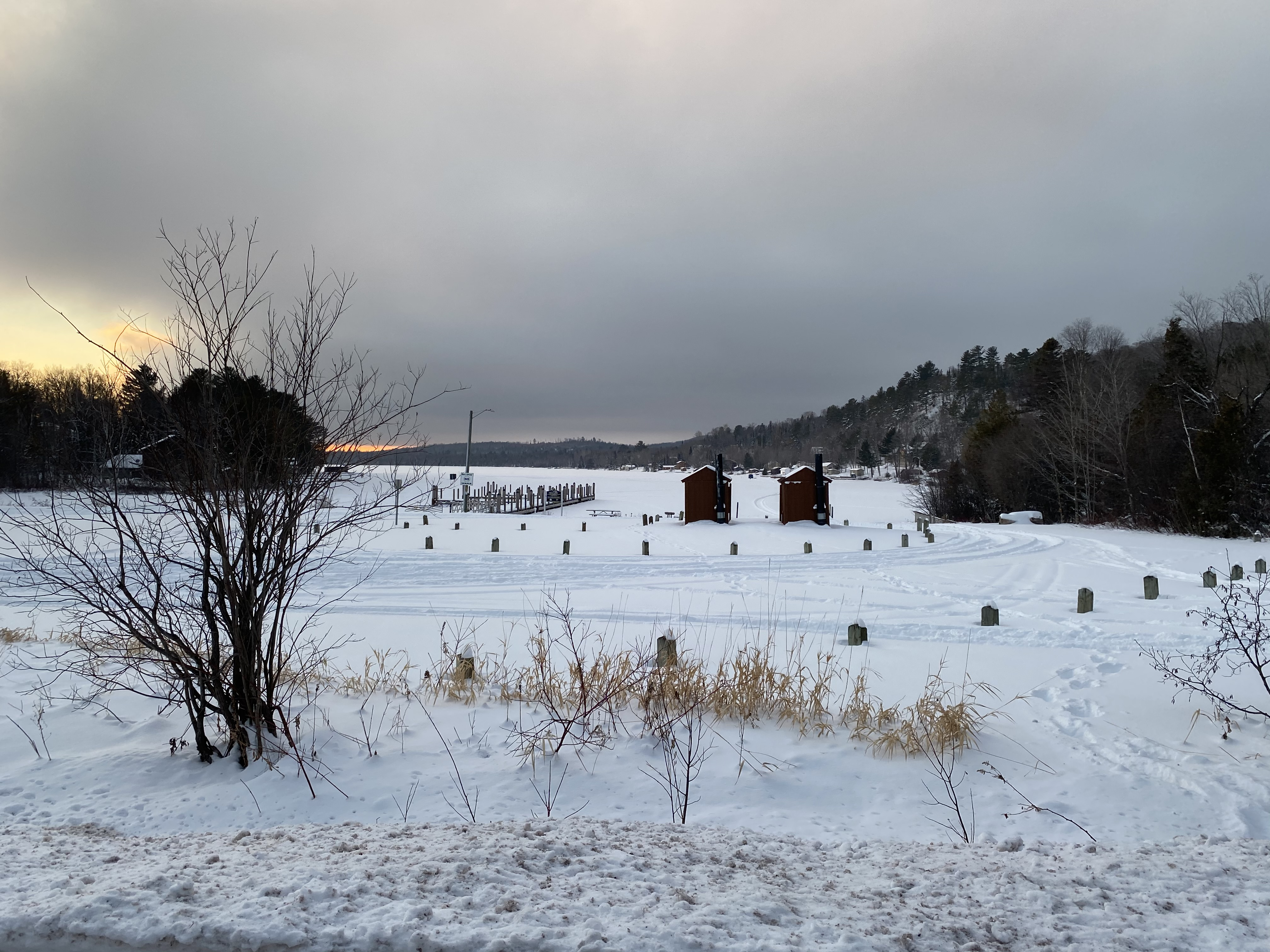
Lac La Belle Boat Launch

Haven Falls is a waterfall that is part of the Haven Creek. The falls are located approximately 500 feet (150 m) from the inflow to Lac La Belle.

== See also ==
- List of lakes in Michigan
