= Bond Falls =

Waterfall on the Ontonagon River in Michigan, United States

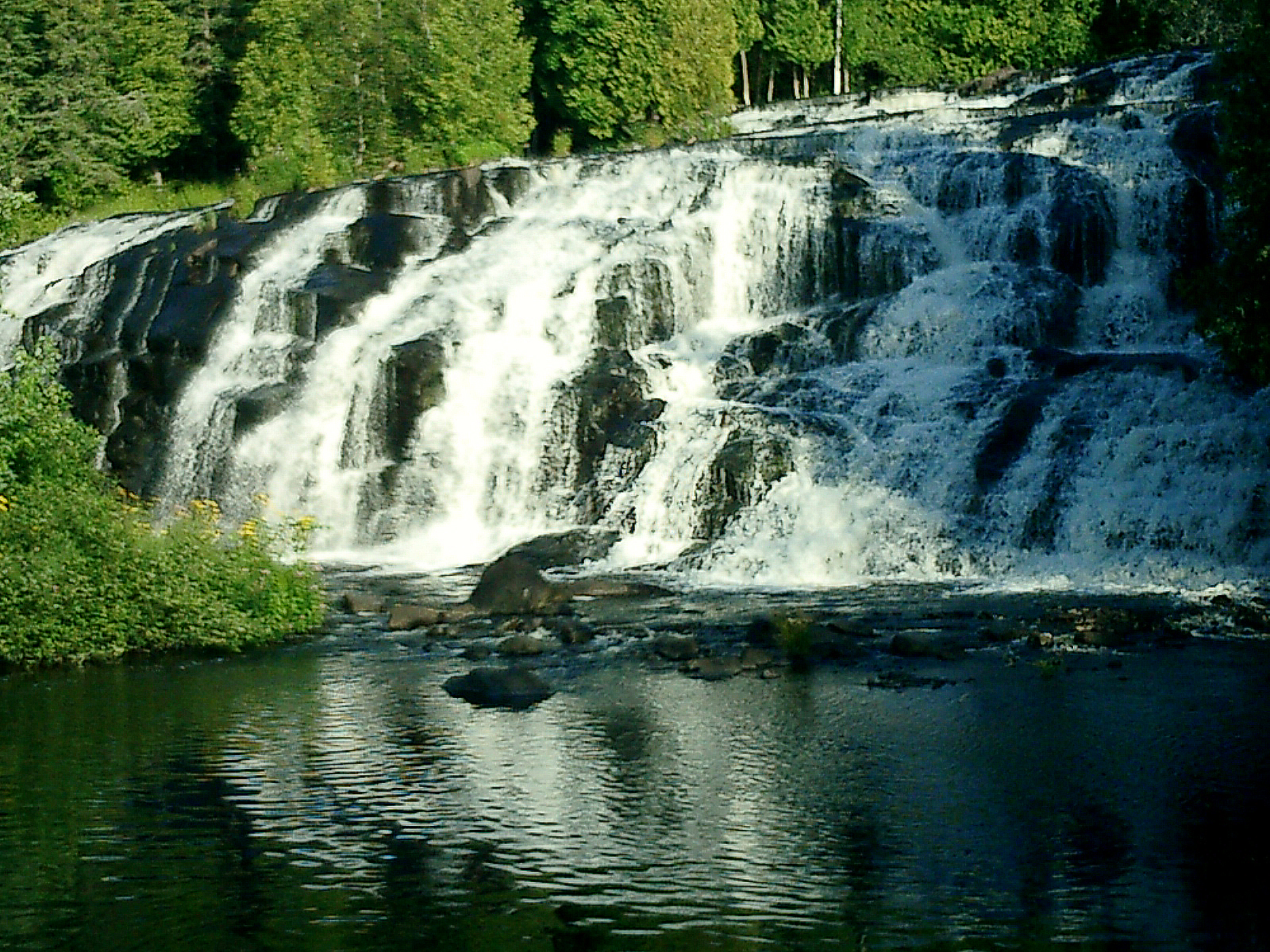
- Bond Falls during summertime in 2006

- Location within Michigan
- Location: Haight Township; Ontonagon County, Michigan
- Coordinates: 46°24′31.7″N 89°07′58.4″W
- Type: Cascade
- Total height: 50 feet (15 m)
- Number of drops: 1
- Watercourse: Ontonagon River

Bond Falls is a waterfall on the middle branch of the Ontonagon River, a few miles east of Paulding in Haight Township in southern Ontonagon County, Michigan. The site is near U.S. Highway 45 in the western portion of the Upper Peninsula of Michigan. The waterfalls are listed by the state of Michigan as the Bond Falls Scenic Site.

The total drop of the falls is about 50 feet (15 m). Trails lead to and from the falls from a picnic area atop the falls. There is a newer walkway that extends across the river below the base of the falls that allows for perfect viewing. The river drops 875 feet (267 m) down from Bond Falls Flowage, which is perched on the highlands of the western Upper Peninsula, to Lake Superior. Bond Falls is the first stage of this drop in elevation. From Bond Falls, the river continues northward to the Agate Falls Scenic Site.

A "flowage", in the language of the Upper Peninsula of Michigan, is a reservoir. Bond Falls is not a natural waterfall, it has been changed by a nearby dam built by the Upper Peninsula Power Company (UPPCO). There is a rest-area park below the dam and waterfall, from which the falls can be admired. The Ontonagan River and Bond Falls Flowage are separately stocked with brook trout.

== Gallery ==
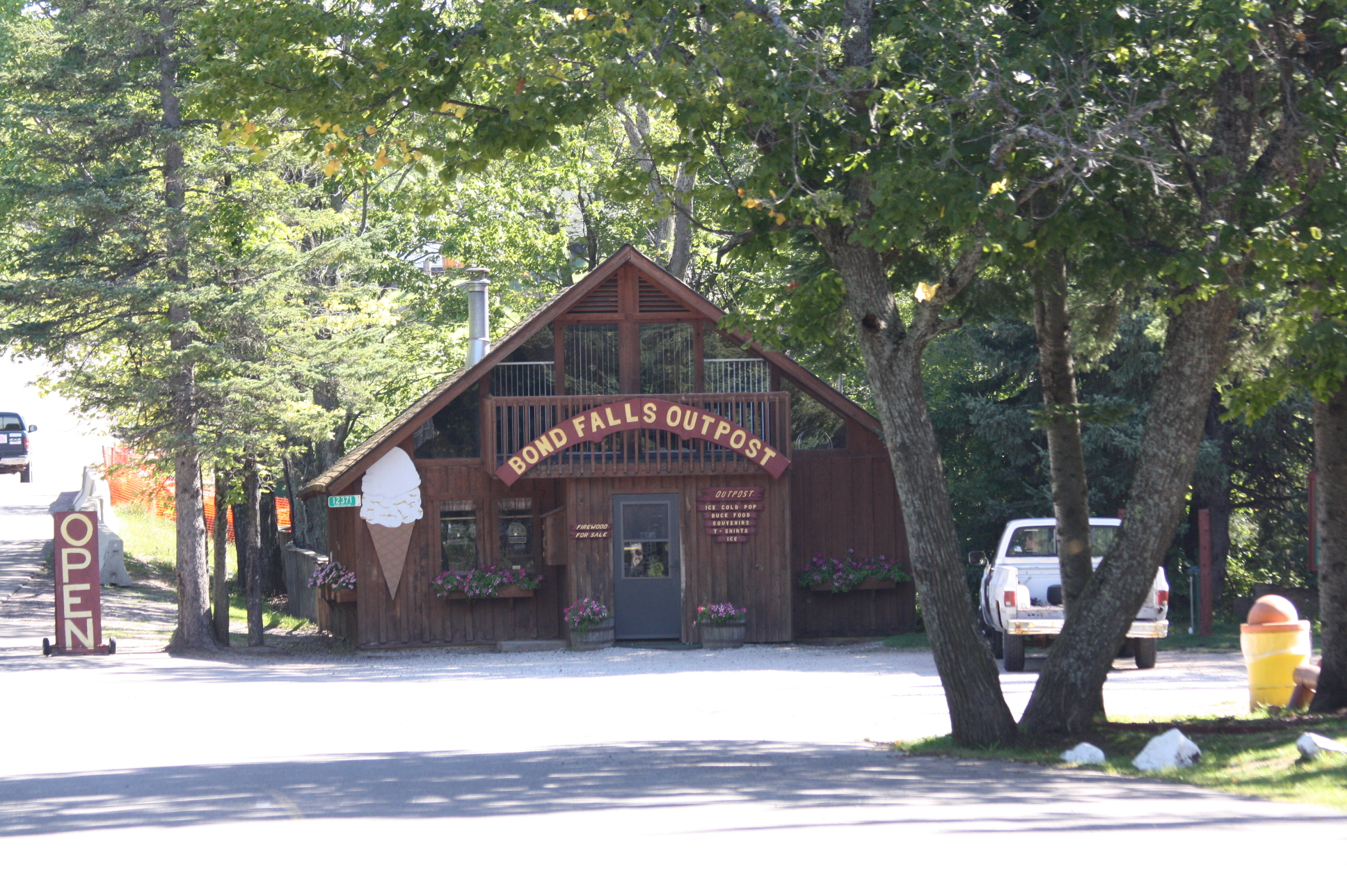
Bond Falls outpost

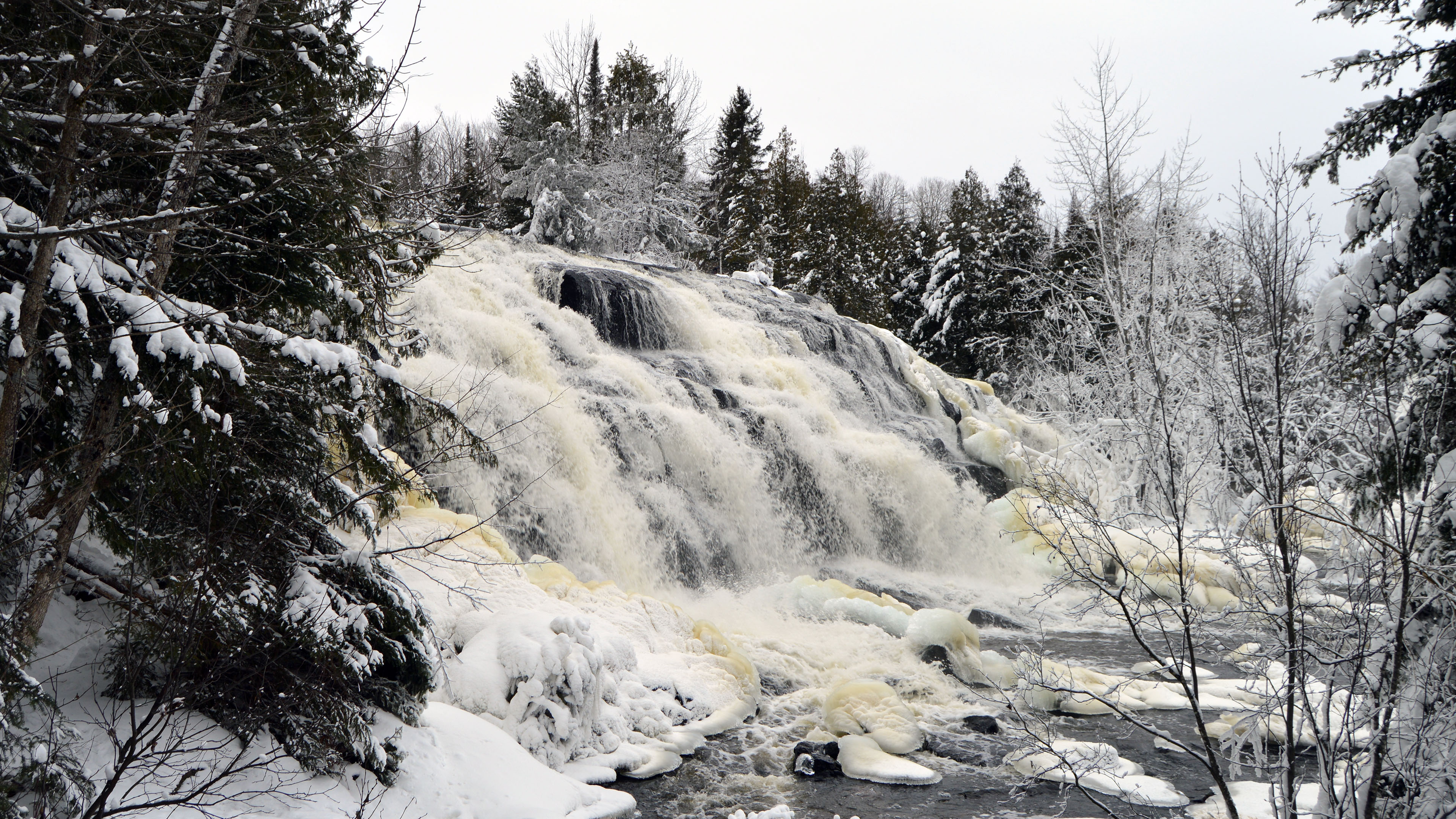
Bond Falls in January

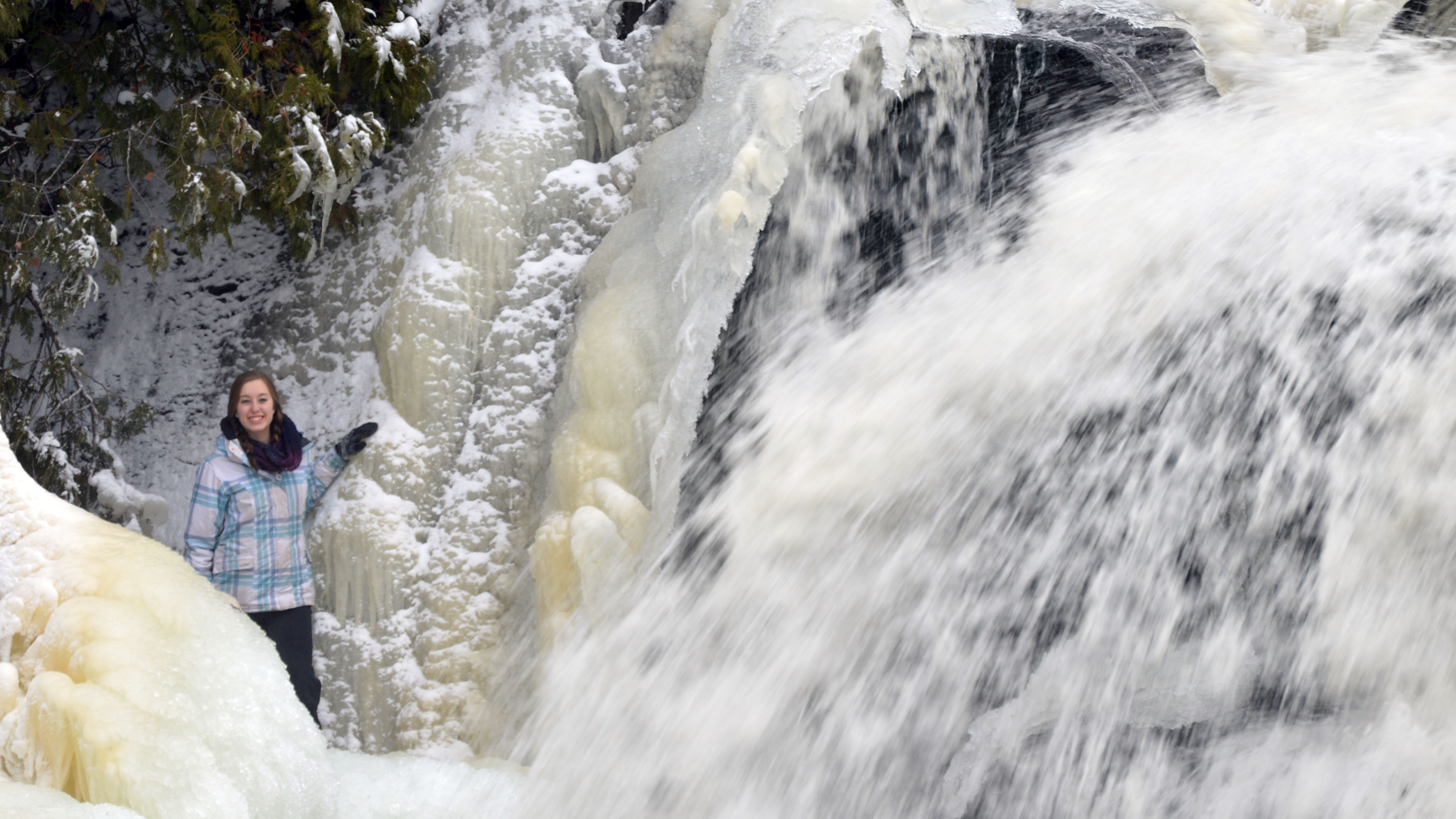
Up Close Icy Flow

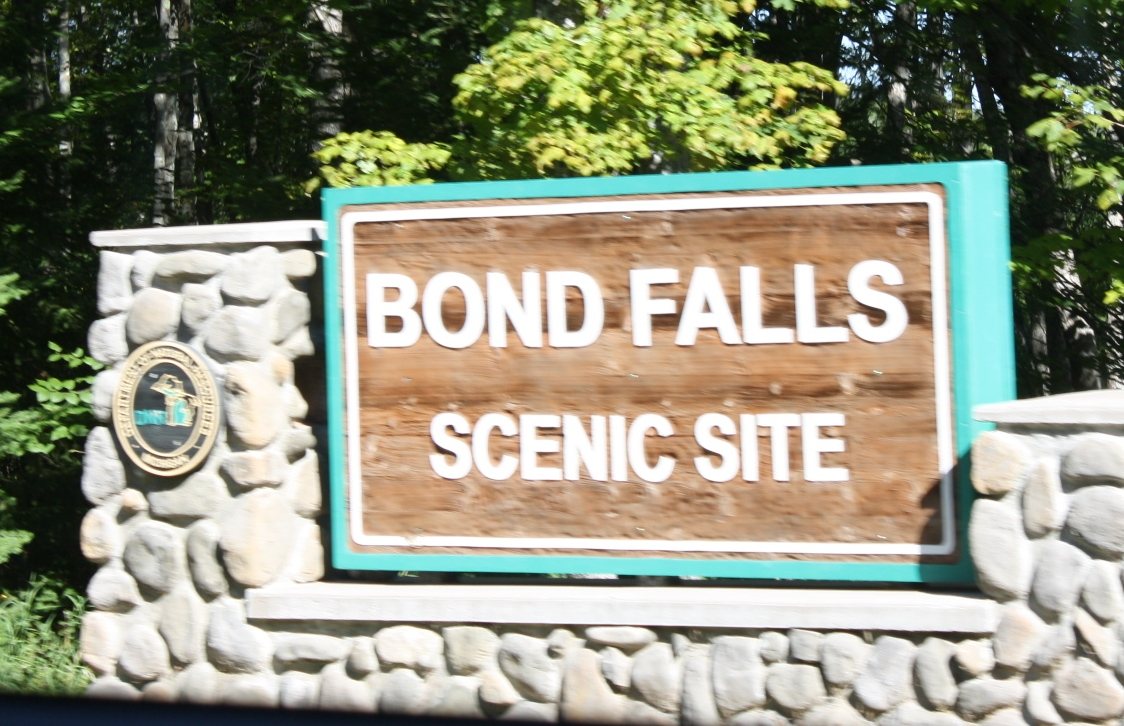
Entrance sign

== See also ==
- List of waterfalls
