= Deer Island Lake =

Lake in the state of Michigan, United States

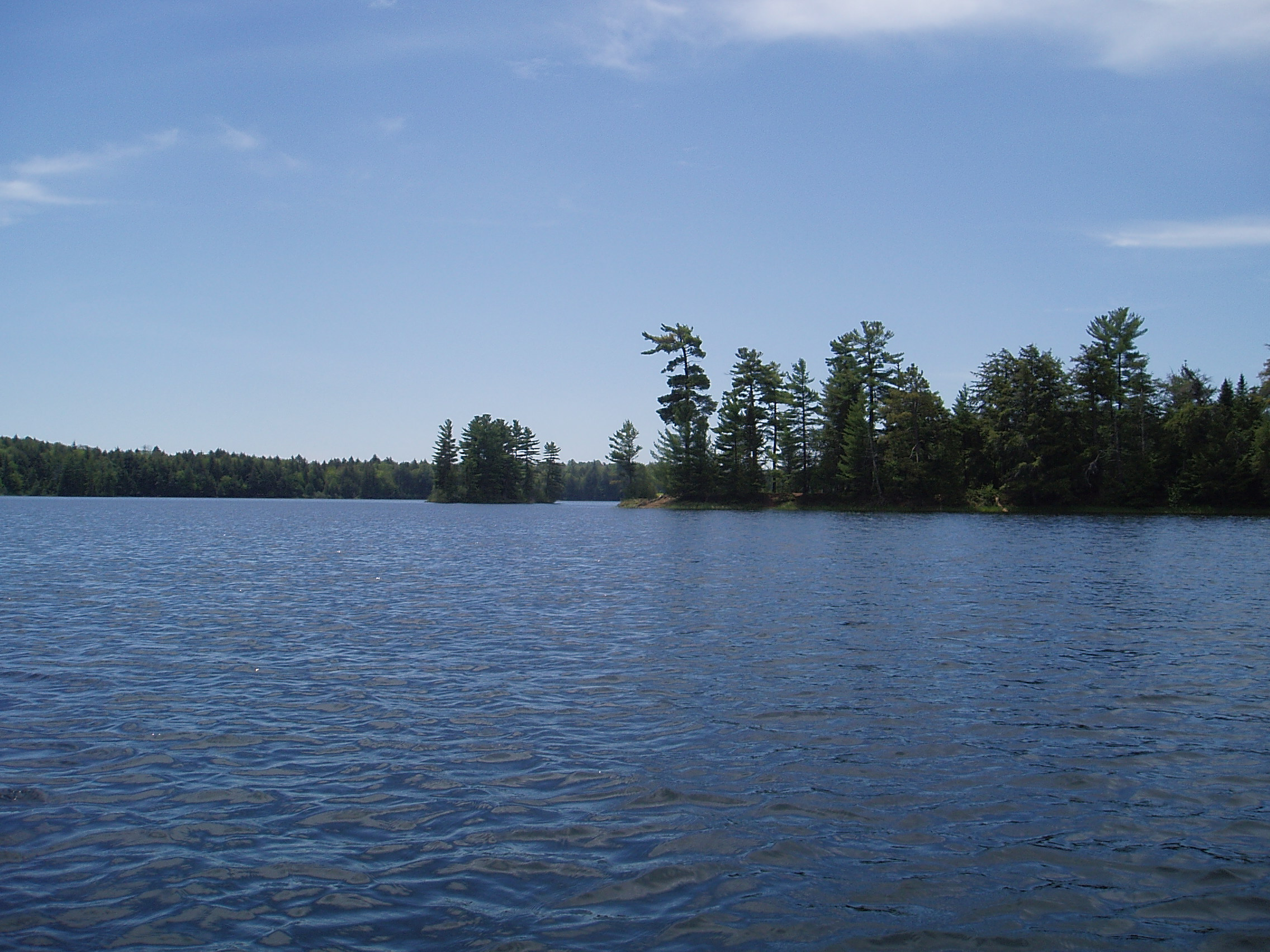

- Location within Michigan
- Location: Gogebic County, Michigan
- Coordinates: 46°12′N 89°16′W
- Basin countries: United States
- Surface area: 346 acres (1.4 km^{2})
- Max. depth: 55 ft (17 m)
- Surface elevation: 1,716 feet (523 m)
- Islands: Charred Island

Deer Island Lake is a lake located in Gogebic County in the U.S. state of Michigan. The Lake is one of about 24 clear, clean lakes located in a special wilderness area known as the Sylvania Wilderness, which in turn is located within the Ottawa National Forest a few miles (6 to 8 km) to the west of the town of Watersmeet. The shoreline is completely undeveloped, and surrounded by virgin forest consisting mainly of hemlock and pine. This crystal-clear spring-fed lake is one of the most remote in the Sylvania Tract, but is well worth the journey for those intrepid enough to make it. The total surface area of the lake is 346 acres (1.4 km^{2}), with maximum depths of 55 ft (17 m). The lake is named for the very large island in the center of the lake, which deer inhabit by crossing back and forth on the ice in winter. Several smaller islands and numerous rocky shoals add to the overall beauty of this fine body of water.

Like all lakes in the Sylvania Tract, Deer Island lake has numerous special regulations designed to protect and ensure its wilderness quality for future generations. These regulations include no motors on watercraft and catch and release for bass.

== See also ==
- List of lakes in Michigan
