= Loon Lake (Gogebic County, Michigan) =

Lake in the state of Michigan, United States

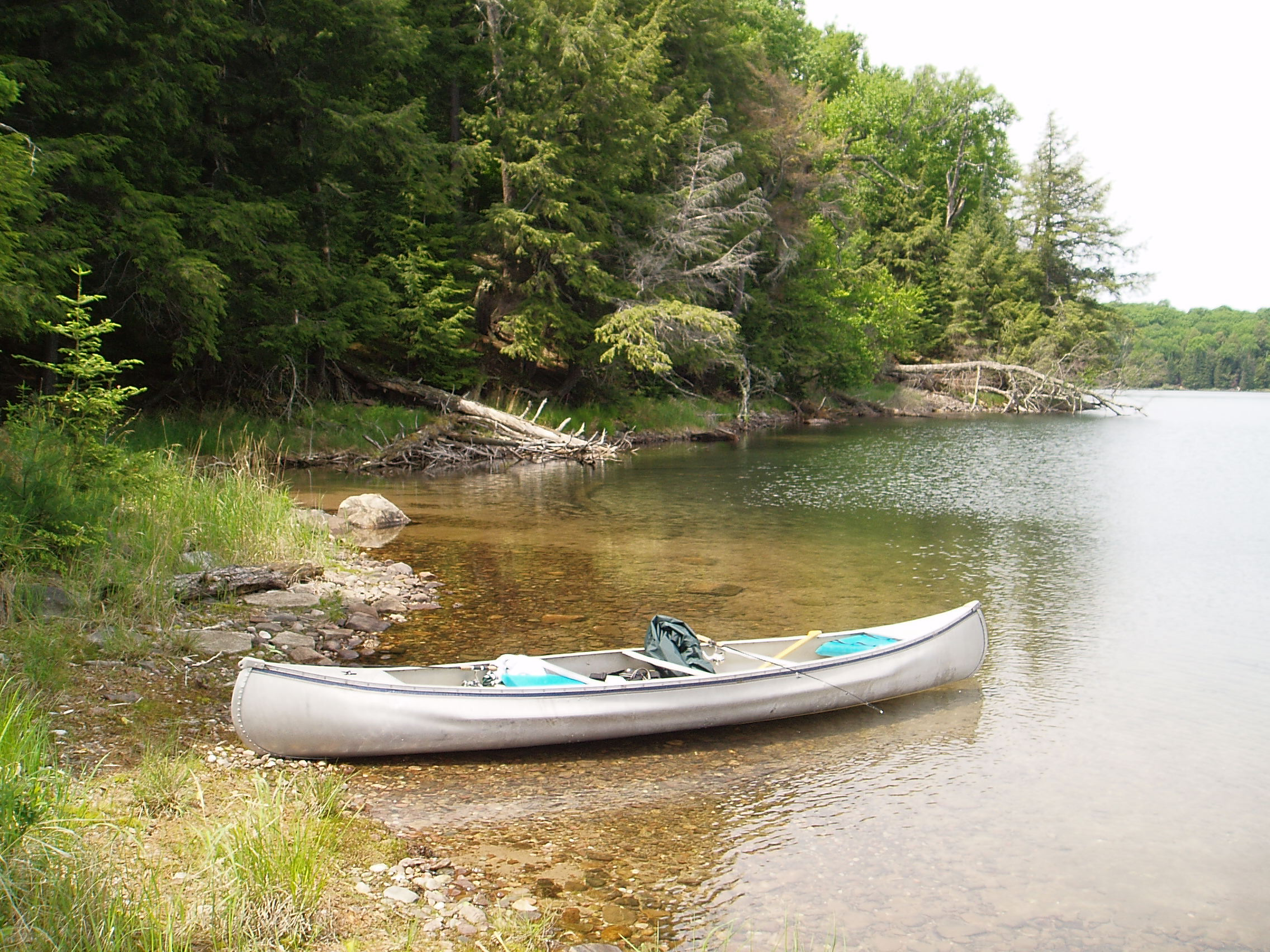

- Location within Michigan
- Location: Gogebic County, Michigan
- Coordinates: 46°12′N 89°18′W
- Basin countries: United States
- Surface area: 375 acres (1.5 km^{2})
- Max. depth: 53 ft (16 m)
- Surface elevation: 1,716 feet (523 m)

Loon Lake is a lake located in Gogebic County in the U.S. state of Michigan. Loon Lake is one of about two dozen clear, clean lakes located in a special wilderness area known as the Sylvania Wilderness, which in turn is located within the Ottawa National Forest a few miles to the west of the town of Watersmeet. The shoreline is completely undeveloped, and surrounded by virgin timber consisting mainly of hemlock and pine. This remote, spring-fed lake is noted for its rugged beauty. The total surface area of the lake is 375 acres (1.5 km^{2}), with maximum depths of 53 feet (16 m).

Like all lakes in the Sylvania Tract, Loon lake has numerous special regulations designed to protect and ensure its wilderness quality for future generations. These regulations include no motors on watercraft and catch and release for bass.

== See also ==
- List of lakes in Michigan
