= O Kun de Kun Falls =

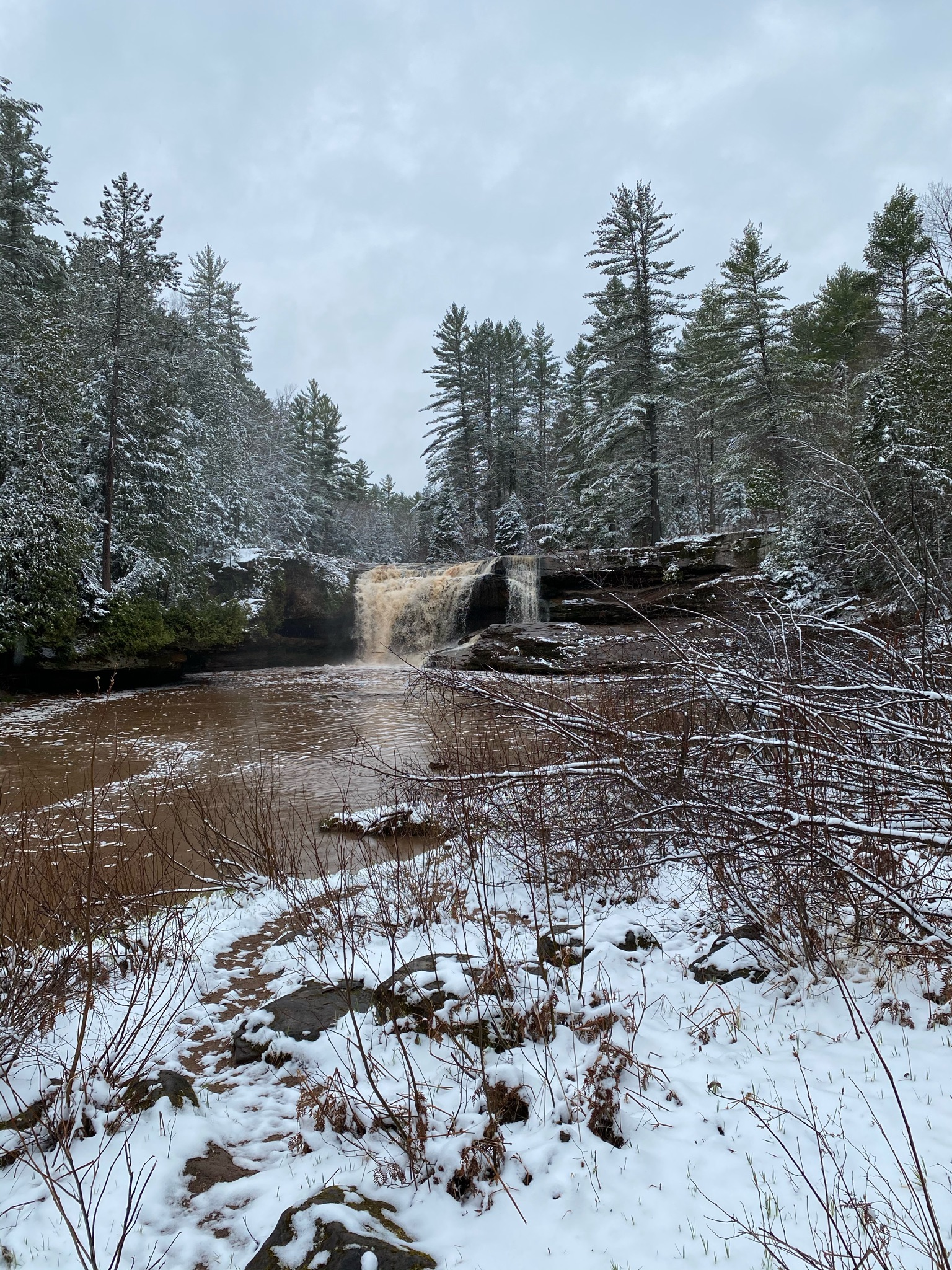
- O Kun de Kun Falls from a distance.
- Interactive map of O Kun de Kun Falls
- Location: Stannard Township, Ontonagon County, Michigan
- Coordinates: 46.6489218°N 89.1503390°W
- Elevation: 919 feet (280 m)
- Total height: 30 feet (9.1 m)
- Number of drops: 2
- Longest drop: 20 feet (6.1 m)
- Total width: 20 feet (6.1 m)
- Average width: 10 feet (3.0 m) to 30 feet (9.1 m)
- Watercourse: Baltimore River

O Kun de Kun Falls is a waterfall of the Baltimore River north of Bruce Crossing, in Ontonagon County, Michigan.

== The Falls ==
There are two drops that make up O Kun de Kun Falls. The North Country Trail parallels both of the drops and allows access to the site. The falls are part of the Ottawa National Forest and are administered by the United States Forest Service. The falls are named after the Chippewa Chief O Kun de Kun (ca. 1760 - 1859) who was originally from the Ontonagon area.

=== Upper Falls ===
The Upper Falls is a 10-foot (3.0 m) drop along the river. It is also sometimes referred to as Peanut Butter Falls.

=== O Kun de Kun Falls ===
The lower of the two falls has a 20-foot (6.1 m) drop, with widths between 10 feet (3.0 m) and 30 feet (9.1 m) depending on the time of year. The North Country Trail follows the river and a suspension bridge crosses the river just after the falls.

== Access ==
The falls are approximately 1.3 miles (2.1 km) from US Highway 45. The North Country Trail runs past the falls in both gravel and boardwalk sections. There is parking near the highway and camping sites near the base of O Kun de Kun Falls.

== Images ==
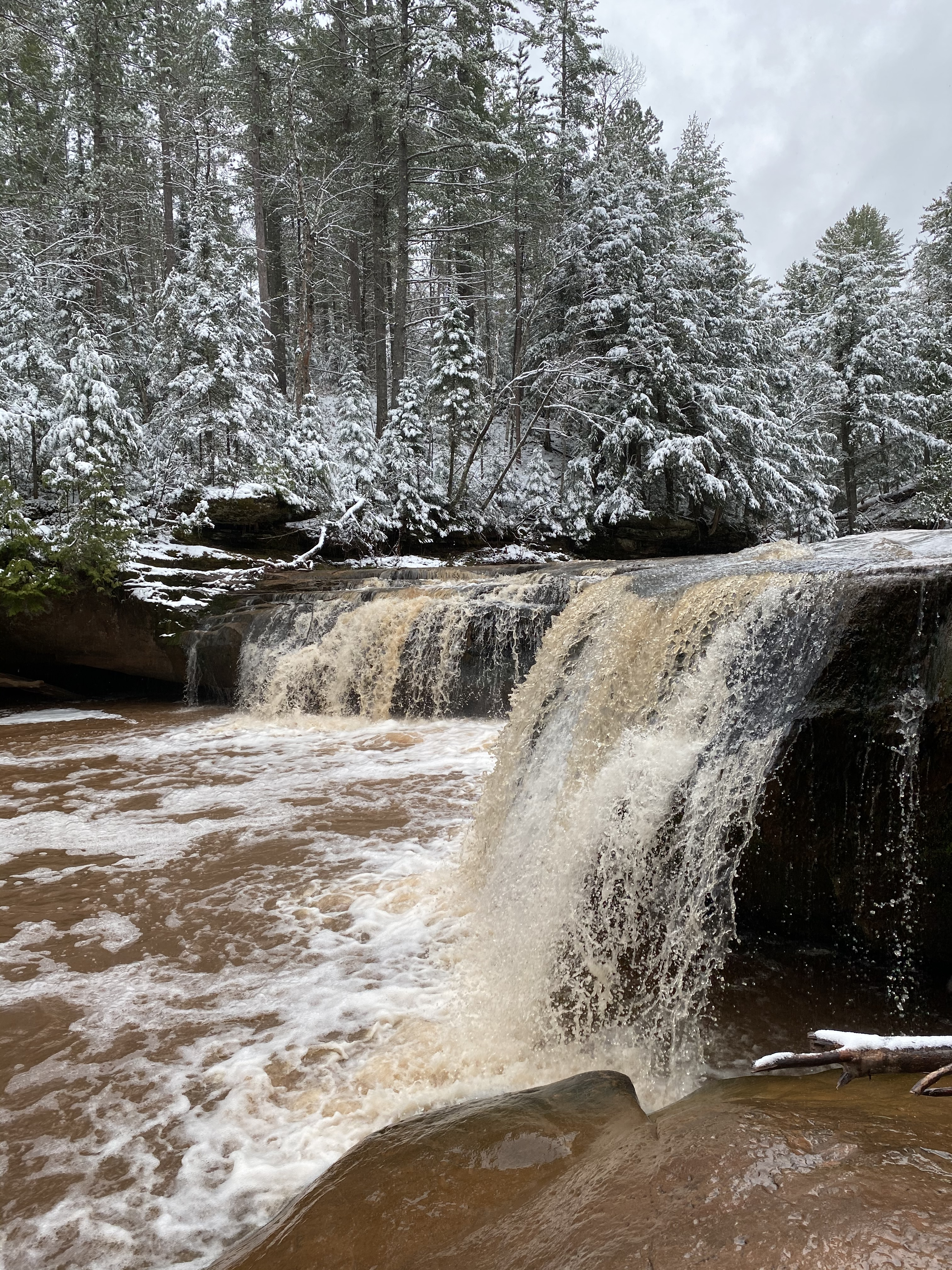
The Upper Falls.

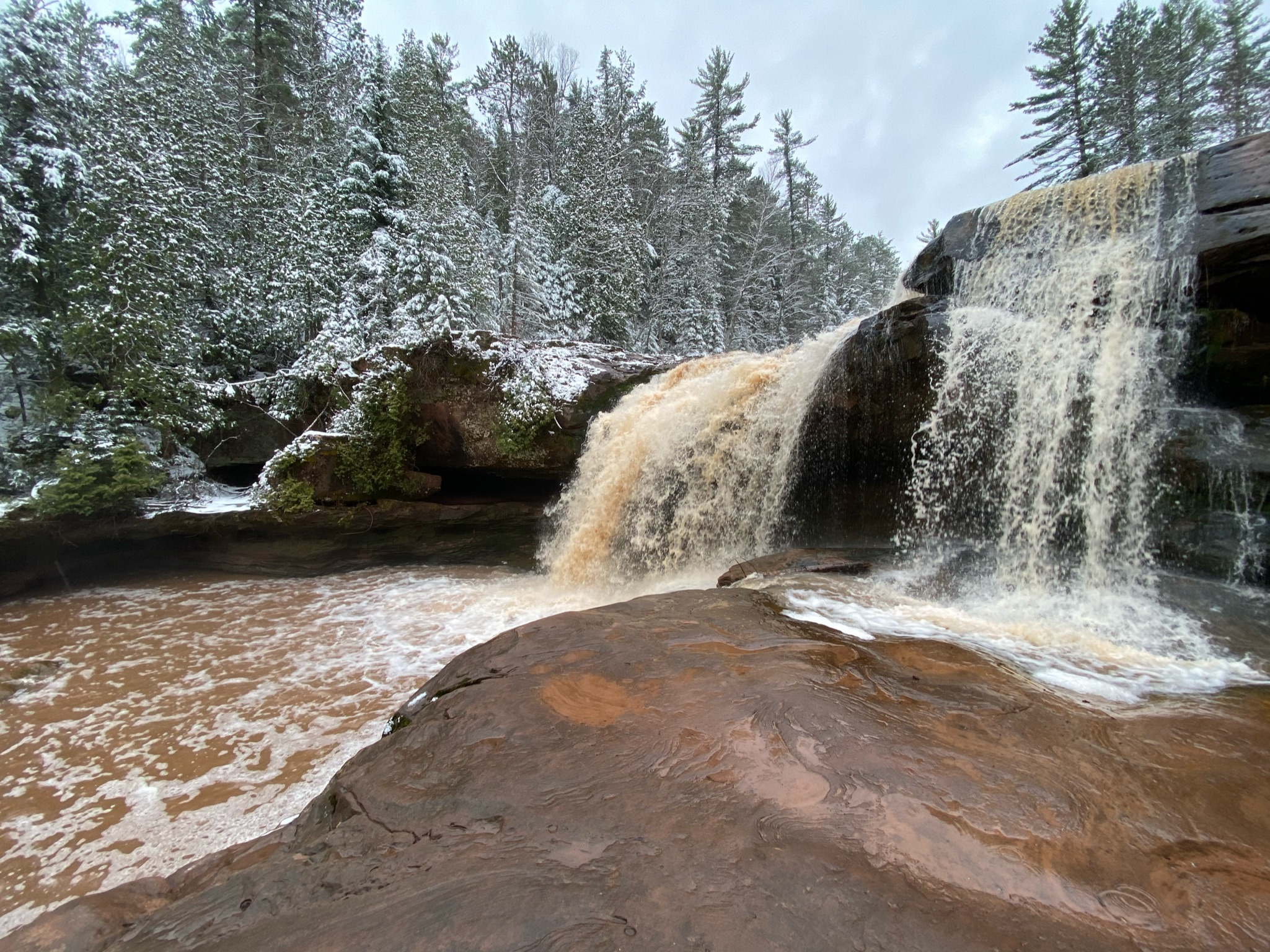
O Kun de Kun Falls close to the base.

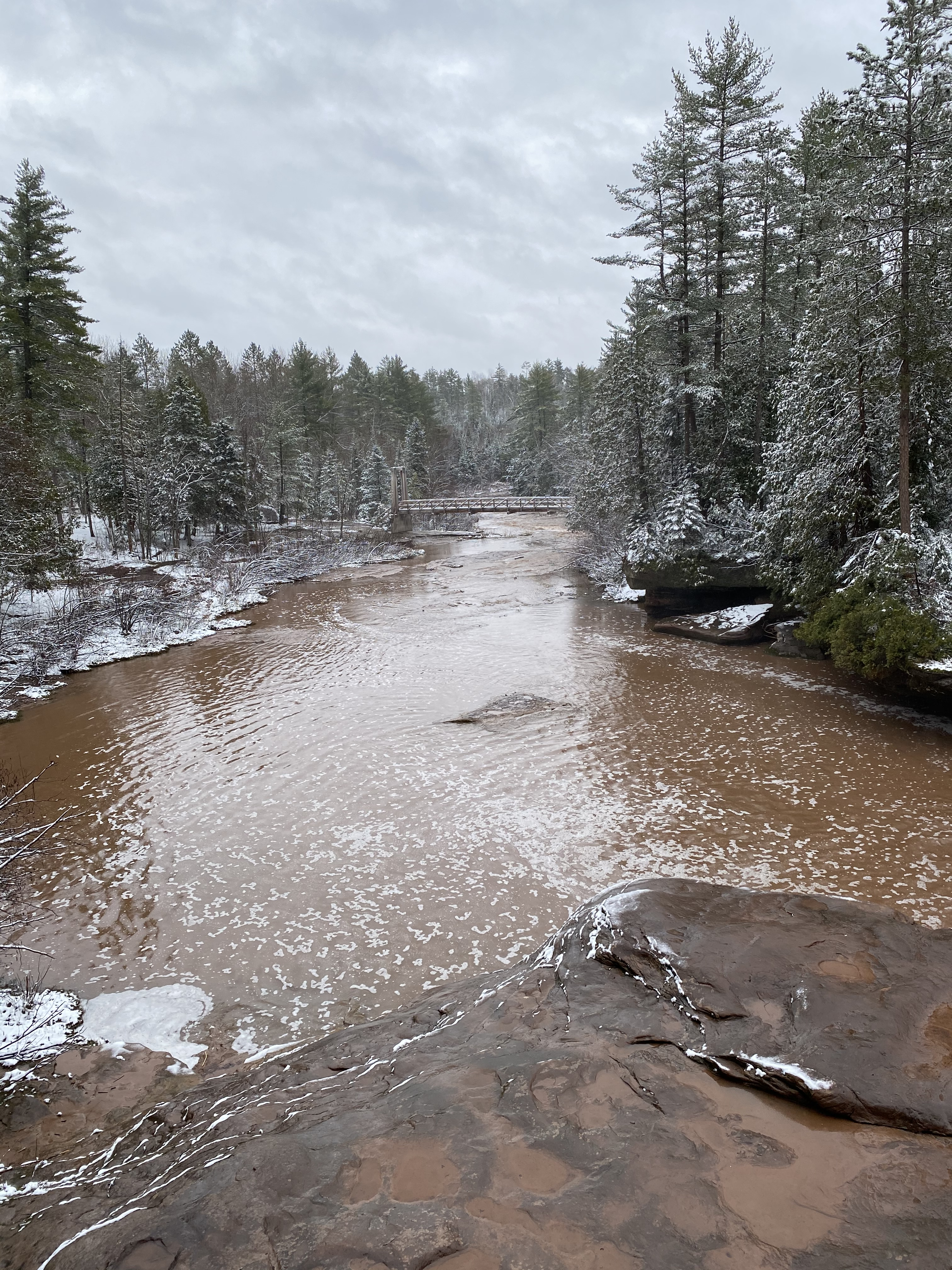
Baltimore River and truss bridge from above the falls.

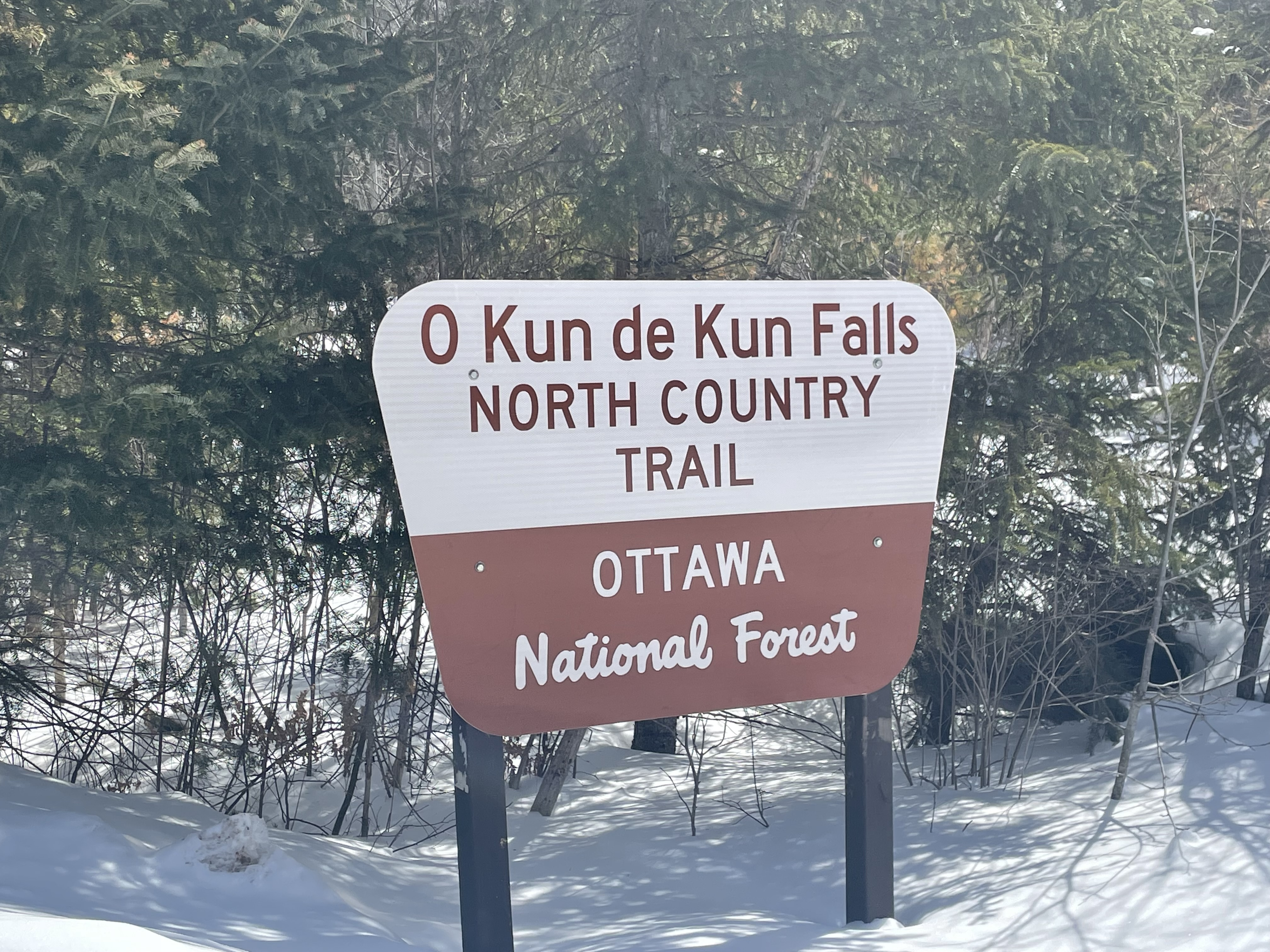
Sign at US 45
