= Fisher Lake (Michigan) =

Lake in the state of Michigan, United States

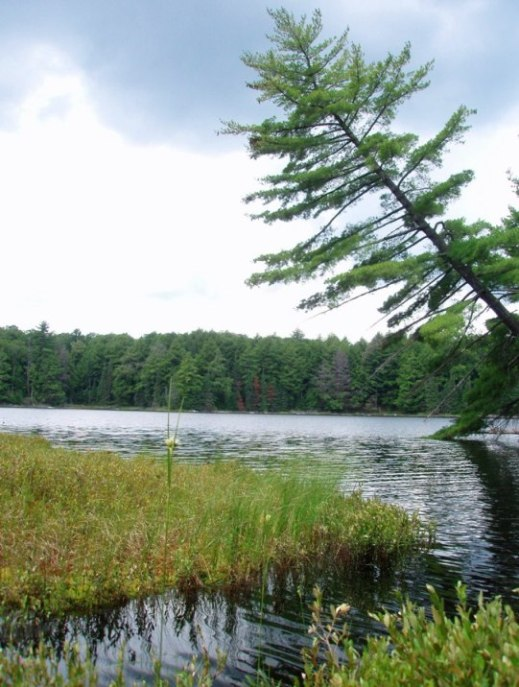

- Location within Michigan
- Location: Gogebic County, Michigan
- Coordinates: 46°11′30″N 89°18′16″W
- Basin countries: United States
- Surface area: 31 acres (0.1 km^{2})
- Max. depth: 39 ft (12 m)
- Surface elevation: 1,745 feet (532 m)

Fisher Lake is a small, isolated lake located in Gogebic County in the U.S. state of Michigan. Fisher Lake is one of about two dozen clear, clean lakes located in a special wilderness area known as the Sylvania Wilderness, which in turn is located within the Ottawa National Forest a few miles to the west of the town of Watersmeet. This is one of the most remote and least visited lakes of the Sylvania Wilderness and a visit here is sure to provide a measure solitude along with a true wilderness experience. The shoreline is completely undeveloped, and surrounded by virgin timber consisting mainly of hemlock, pine and maple. This remote lake is bordered by abundant bog habitat and is home to pitcher plants and other bog flora. The total surface area of the lake is 31 acres (0.1 km^{2}), with maximum depths of 39 feet (12 m).

Like all lakes in the Sylvania Tract, Fisher Lake has numerous special regulations designed to protect and ensure its wilderness quality for future generations. These regulations include no motors on watercraft and catch-and-release only fishing for bass with barbless hooks. Largemouth bass of relatively small size but with a strikingly dark coloration inhabit Fisher Lake.

== See also ==
- List of lakes in Michigan
