= Bergland Administrative Site =

- U.S. National Register of Historic Places
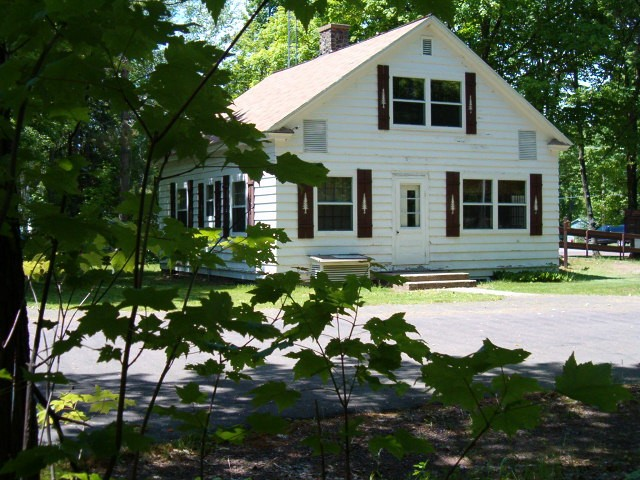
- Ranger's Dwelling

- Location within Michigan Location within the United States
- Interactive map
- Location: M-28, Bergland, Michigan
- Coordinates: 46°35′30″N 89°34′38″W
- Area: 10 acres (4.0 ha)
- Built: 1936
- Architectural style: Colonial Revival
- NRHP reference No.: 05000103
- Added to NRHP: July 9, 2005

The Bergland Administrative Site, also known as the Bergland Ranger Station, is a government administrative complex consisting of six buildings located along M-28 in Bergland, Michigan. It was listed on the National Register of Historic Places in 2005, and currently houses the Bergland Cultural & Heritage Center and The Bergland/Matchwood Historical Society Museum.

== History ==
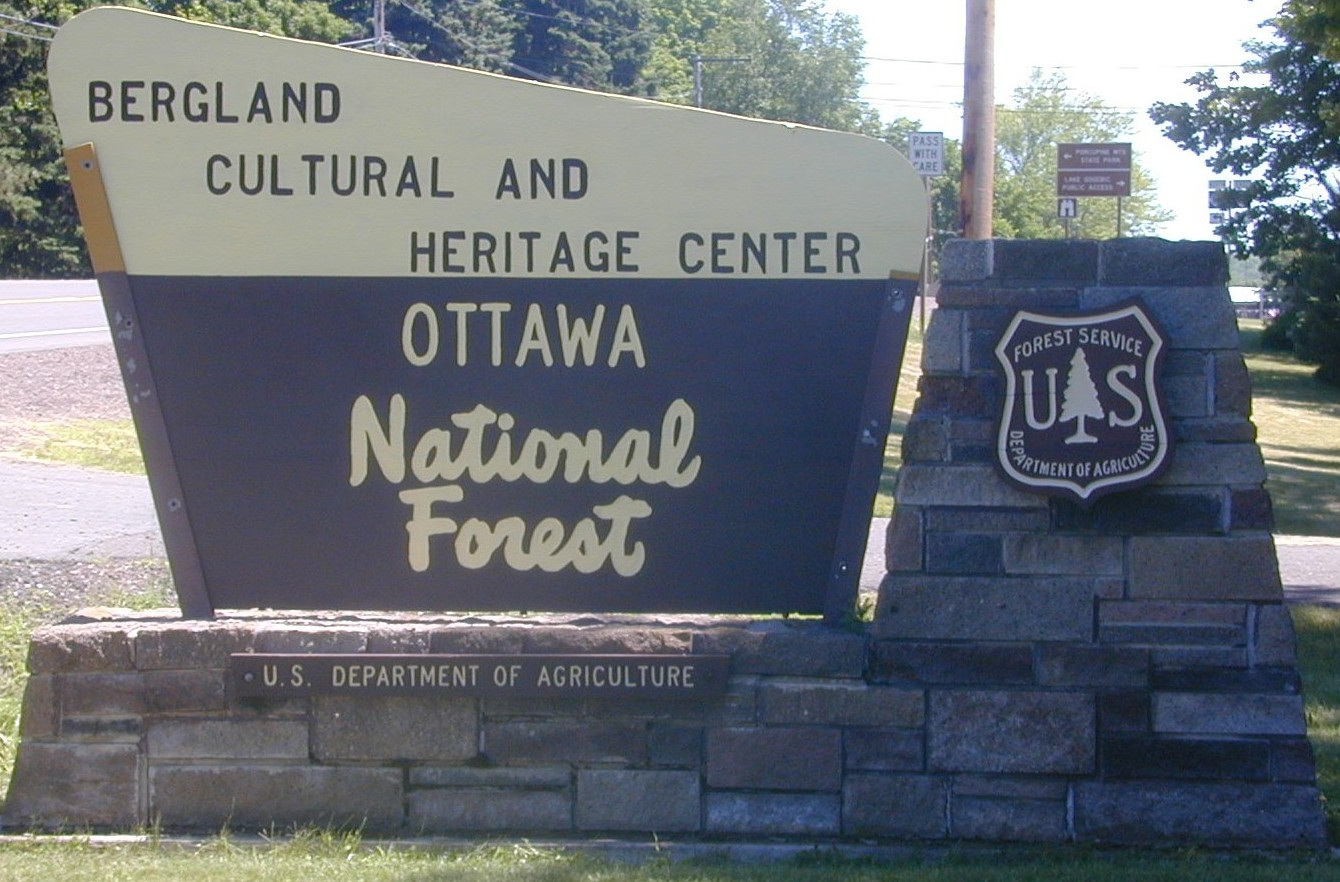
Sign in front of station

Around 1900, Gunlek A. Bergland purchased lands in this area for their timber. At first Bergland shipped logs east to another sawmill, but around 1903 established a new mill on Lake Gogebic, and renamed the small surrounding community after himself. The mill and its successors ran in Bergland until 1958. However, by the 1920s, much of the land in the area was cut over, and the United States Forest Service purchased large swaths here and in other places in the Upper Peninsula. The Ottawa National Forest was established in 1931 to manage the lands, with a supervisory office at Munising. In 1935, the office was moved to Ironwood. However, with the introduction of the Civilian Conservation Corps (CCC) to the forest, more localized offices were needed, and in the same year, seven district offices were established, including this one in Bergland.

The first ranger assigned to the site, Joseph "Popcorn" Blake, arrived in 1935 and lived in town until the site was ready. In 1936, the CCC began work on the buildings, finishing the construction in 1937. It was one of the first administrative offices built in the Ottawa National Forest. The site originally contained a Ranger's Office and dwelling, a garage, an oil house and woodshed, a warehouse, a latrine, and a weather instrument station. The latter two structures have since been demolished. An Assistant Ranger's dwelling was added in 1957, a small woodshed was constructed in 1979, and a pole shed was added in 1985.

However, when the ranger staff expanded to cover environmental monitoring and recreation, the site became obsolete. The station was closed in 1998. The Ottawa National Forest partnered with the Bergland Cultural & Heritage Center and The Bergland/Matchwood Historical Society Museum, who use the buildings on the site. In 2009, the Museum moved into the ranger house and garage. The Cultural & Heritage Center uses the office and the remainder of the buildings.

== Description ==
The Bergland Administrative Site consists of six frame buildings constructed in 1936–37, and three more structures built latter which are non-contributing. The structures are located along a curved drive.

Ranger Station Office: The Ranger Station Office is a 1 1/2-story Colonial Revival building, based on a standard Forest Service plan, measuring 26 by 30 feet. The structure is wood framed with weatherboard siding and sits on a poured concrete foundation. The entry is through a front-gable, enclosed entry porch centered in the front facade and surrounded by a wood cornice and Doric motif pilasters. On the inside, offices are located on the first and second floors, and mechanicals in the basement.

Ranger's Dwelling: The Ranger's Dwelling is a two-story side-gabled Colonial Revival, also based on a standard Forest Service plan, measuring 26 by 36 feet. The structure is wood-framed with weatherboard siding and sits on a poured concrete foundation. The entry is through a front door with stoop, surrounded by a wood cornice and Doric motif pilasters. A small porch is attached to the rear, and a massive, brick-lined stone chimney stands toward the front to one side. On the inside, the living room, dining room, and second-floor bedrooms have original wood flooring, while the kitchen, bathrooms, and porch are covered in linoleum. In the living room, the fireplace has a brick hearth and surrounds with a finely crafted mantel above and built-in bookcases on either side.

Garage: The garage is a single-story, two-bay, wood-framed, side-gable structure measuring 22 feet by 22 feet. It is also based on a standard Forest Service plan. Each bay has an overhead door.

Warehouse: The warehouse is a 22-foot-by-60-foot side-gable structure with weatherboard siding covering wood framing. It has four garage bays with overhead doors and a pedestrian entrance at one side. The interior is partitioned into two halves.

Oil Shed: The oil shed is a front-gable, one-story shed measuring 10 feet by 12 feet and covered with weatherboard siding on a poured concrete foundation. It has a single door, and is based on a standard Forest Service plan.

Woodshed: The woodshed is a front-gable, one-story shed covered with weatherboard siding on a poured concrete foundation. It has a single door, and is based on a standard Forest Service plan.
