= Clark Lake (Gogebic County, Michigan) =

Lake in the state of Michigan, United States

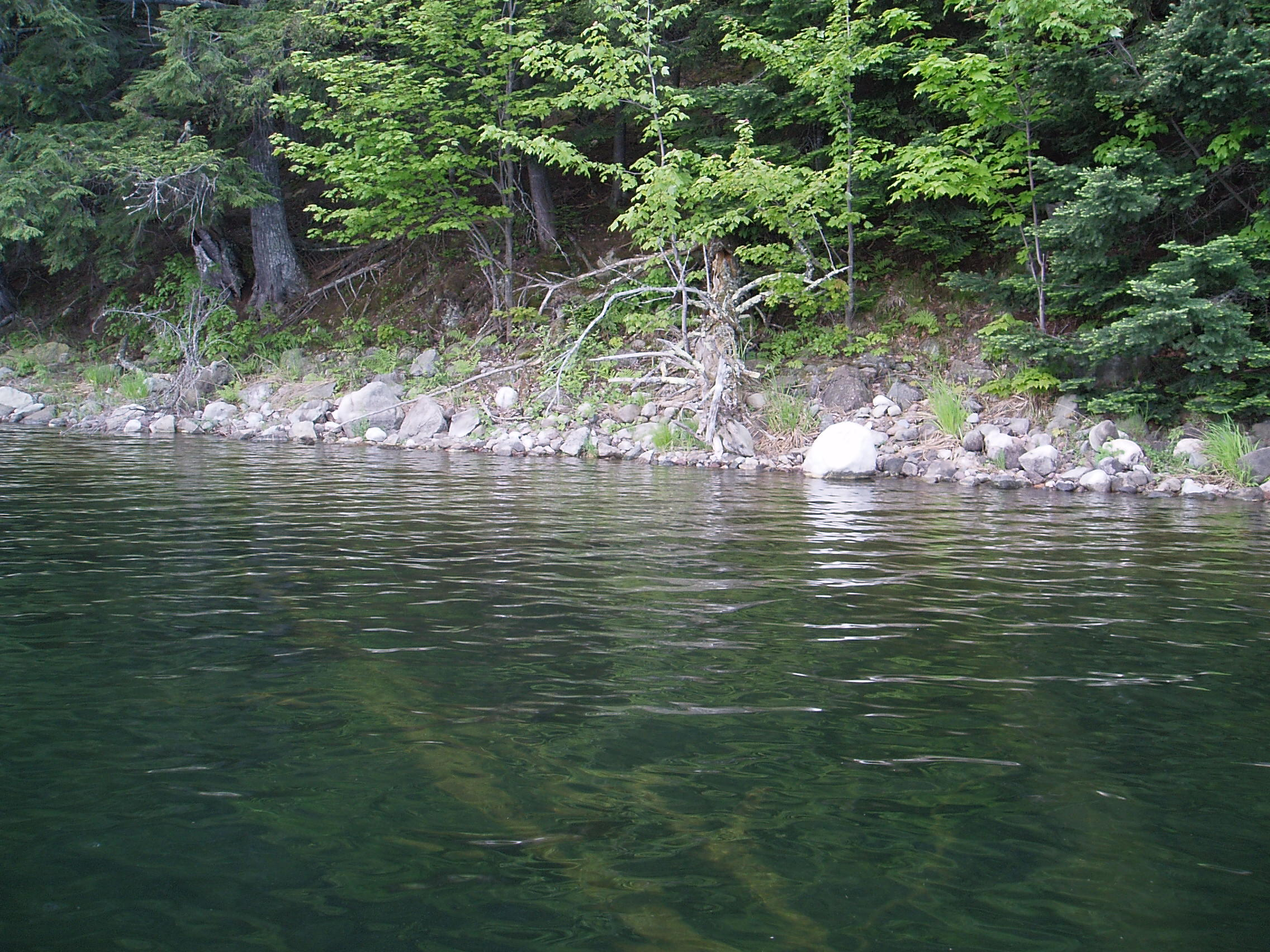
- shoreline

- Location within Michigan
- Location: Gogebic County, Michigan
- Coordinates: 46°13′30.68″N 89°19′13.04″W
- Type: Lake
- Basin countries: United States
- Surface area: 820 acres (3.3 km^{2})
- Max. depth: 74 ft (23 m)
- Surface elevation: 1,713 ft (522 m)

Clark Lake is a lake located in Gogebic County in the U.S. state of Michigan. Clark Lake is one of about two dozen clear, clean lakes located in the Sylvania Wilderness of Ottawa National Forest a few miles (6 to 8 km) to the west of the town of Watersmeet. The shoreline is undeveloped except for a picnic area and boat launch at the northern end. The lake has several islands and numerous bays and coves. Large boulders strewn about the shoreline and lake bed add to the scenic setting of this lake. It is not uncommon to see nesting loons and eagles around the lake's islands, and black bear and wolves inhabit the old-growth forest around the lake. The total surface area of the lake is 820 acres (3.3 km^{2}), with maximum depths of 74 ft (23 m).

Like all lakes in Sylvania, Clark Lake has special regulations designed to protect and ensure its wilderness quality for future generations. No motorized watercraft are allowed, and a catch and release policy is in place for bass species.

== See also ==
- List of lakes in Michigan
