= Stannard Township, Michigan =

- Civil township
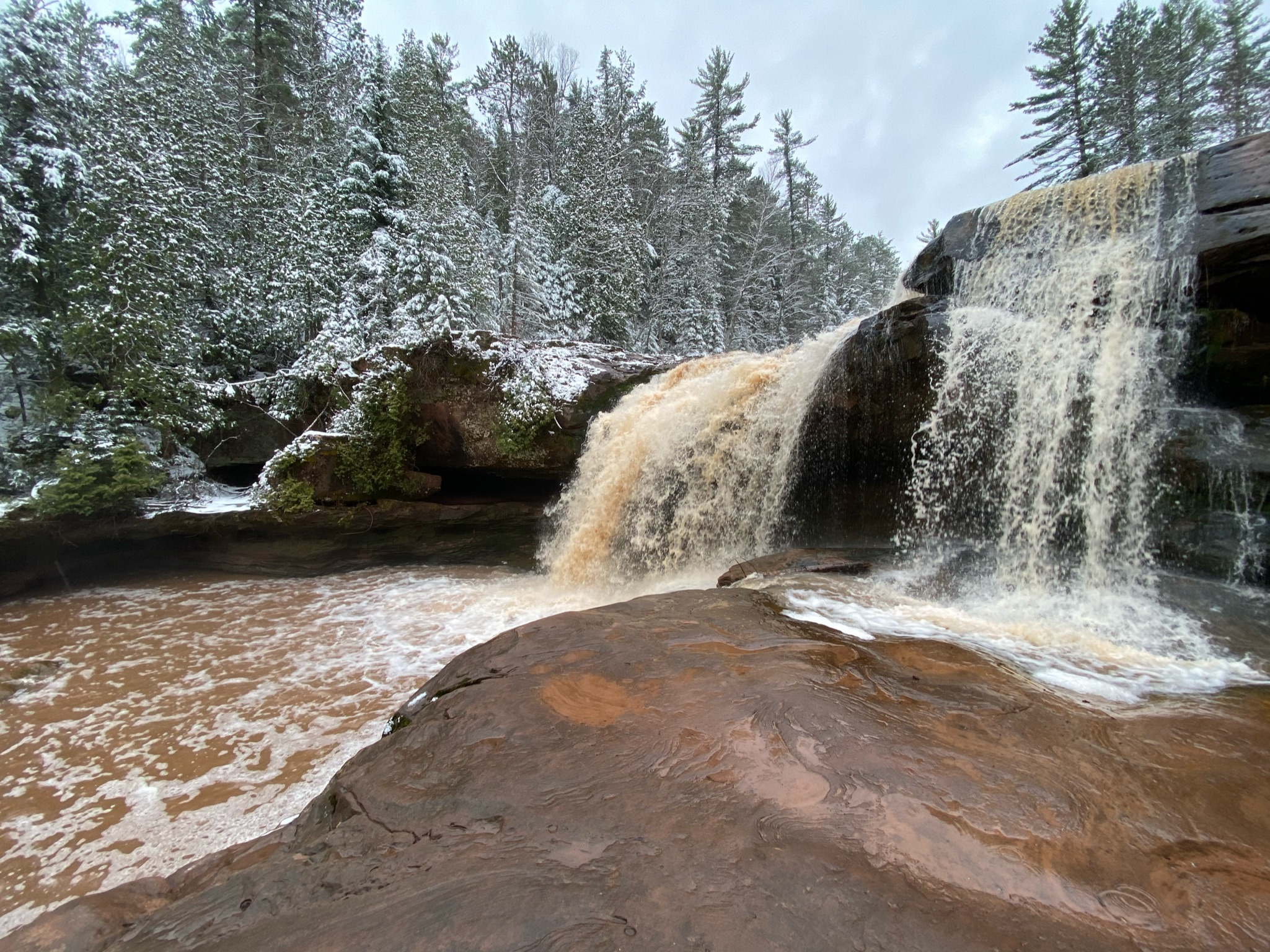
- O Kun de Kun Falls

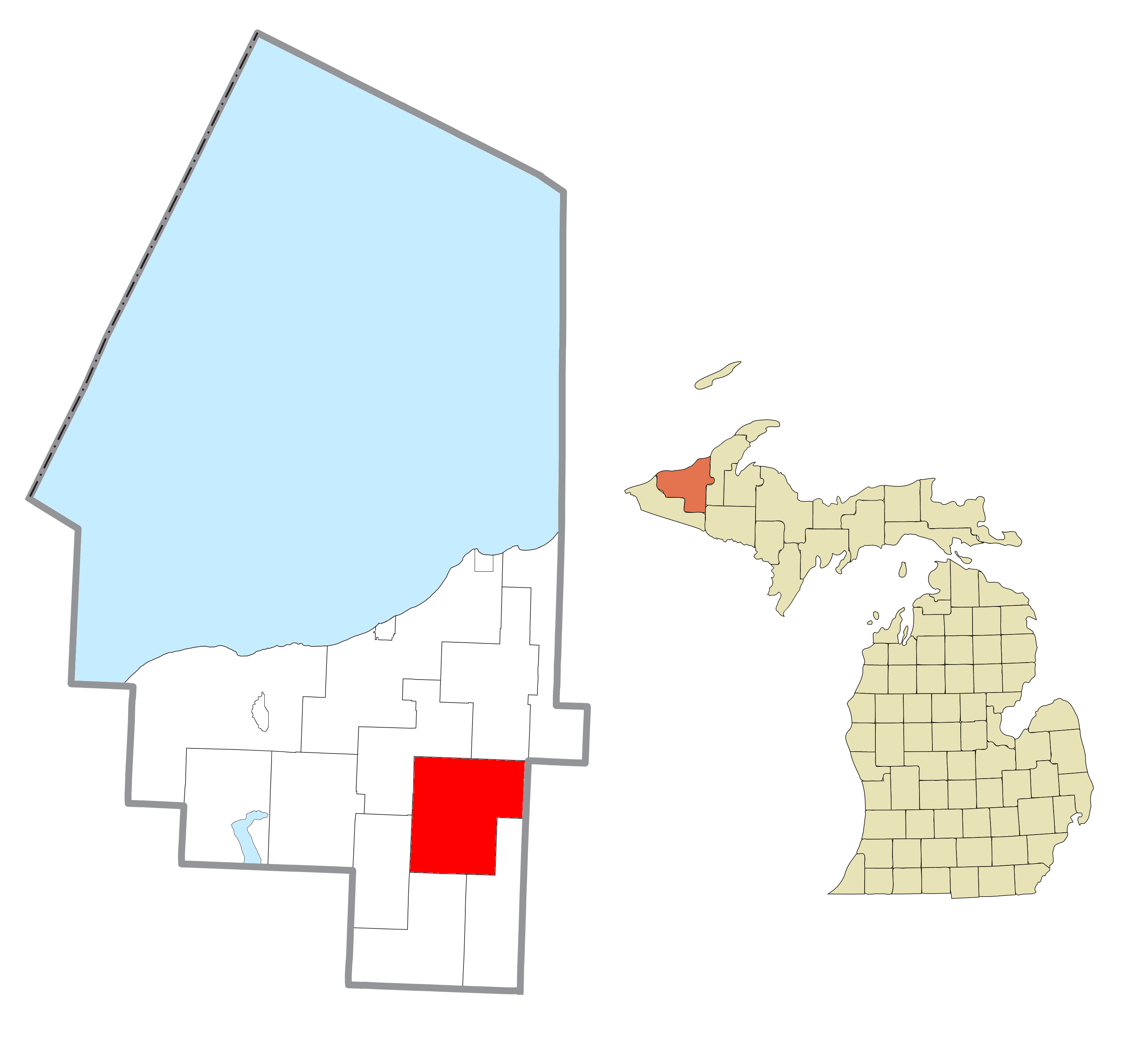
- Location within Ontonagon County

- Location within the state of Michigan Stannard Township (the United States)
- Coordinates: 46°33′36″N 89°08′49″W
- Country: United States
- State: Michigan
- County: Ontonagon

Government
  - Supervisor: Gabriel Lannet
  - Clerk: Crystal Smith

Area
  - Total: 125.14 sq mi (324.1 km^{2})
  - Land: 125.10 sq mi (324.0 km^{2})
  - Water: 0.04 sq mi (0.10 km^{2})
- Elevation: 1,089 ft (332 m)

Population (2020)
  - Total: 645
  - Density: 5.16/sq mi (1.99/km^{2})
- Time zone: UTC-5 (Eastern (EST))
  - Summer (DST): UTC-4 (EDT)
- ZIP code(s): 49912 (Bruce Crossing)
- Area code: 906
- FIPS code: 26-76180
- GNIS feature ID: 1627120
- Website: Official website

Stannard Township is a civil township of Ontonagon County in the U.S. state of Michigan. The population was 645 at the 2020 census. O Kun de Kun Falls is located within the township.

== Geography ==
According to the United States Census Bureau, the township has a total area of 125.14 square miles (324.11 km^{2}), of which 125.10 square miles (324.01 km^{2}) is land and 0.04 square miles (0.10 km^{2}) (0.02%) is water.

The western portion of the township is drained by the Baltimore River and its tributaries. O Kun de Kun Falls is located on the Baltimore River, in the northern part of the township. The middle and eastern portions are drained, respectively, by the middle and east branches of the Ontonagon River.

=== Communities ===
- Bruce Crossing is an unincorporated community and census-designated place in the township.
- Paynesville is an unincorporated community on M-28 and the Soo Line about three miles east of Bruce Crossing at 46°31′25″N 89°06′59″W. It was named after the Payne family who owned homesteads nearby. It was a stop on the Duluth, South Shore and Atlantic Railway. On the SE corner, at the intersection of Blacksmith Rd and N Paynesville Road, in Paynesville, resides a historic Finnish Lutheran Church.

== Demographics ==
As of the census of 2020, there were 645 people, 315 households, and 189 families residing in the township. The population density was 5.16 per square mile (1.99/km^{2}). There were 495 housing units at an average density of 3.96 per square mile (1.53/km^{2}). There were 613 White people, making the township 95.04% White, 1.39% American Indian and Alaska Native, 0.46% Asian, 0.31% Black or African American, and 2.63% from two or more races. Hispanic or Latino of any race were 0.31% of the population.

Among people reporting ancestry, 43.3% reported Finnish ancestry, 18.6% identified their ancestry as American, followed by 12.4% reporting German ancestry. Other ancestries reported were 6.5% Irish, 4.7% English, 2.8% Swedish, 2.0% Dutch, 1.7% Polish, 1.6% Italian, 1.1% Scottish, 1.1% Ukrainian, 0.5% Lithuanian, 0.5% French Canadian, 0.3% Greek, 0.3% Swiss, and 0.3% Scotch-Irish ancestry.

There were 315 households, out of which 10.5% had children under the age of 18 living with them, 50.5% were married couples living together, 5.4% had a male householder with no spouse present, 4.1% had a female householder with no spouse present, and 40.0% were non-families. 34.0% of all households were made up of individuals, and 22.2% had someone living alone who was 65 years of age or older. The average household size was 2.02 and the average family size was 2.58.

In the township the population was spread out, although skewing older, with 10.3% under the age of 18, 4.9% from 18 to 24, 15.0% from 25 to 44, 34.5% from 45 to 64, and 35.3% who were 65 years of age or older. The median age was 57.2 years. For every 100 females, there were 129.6 males. For every 100 females age 18 and over, there were 124.1 males.

The median income for a household in the township was $32,917, and the median income for a family was $51,125. Males had a median income of $40,125 versus $30,391 for females. The per capita income for the township was $21,133. About 14.3% of families and 20.9% of the population were below the poverty line, including 23.9% of those under age 18 and 15.2% of those age 65 or over.
