= Baltimore River =

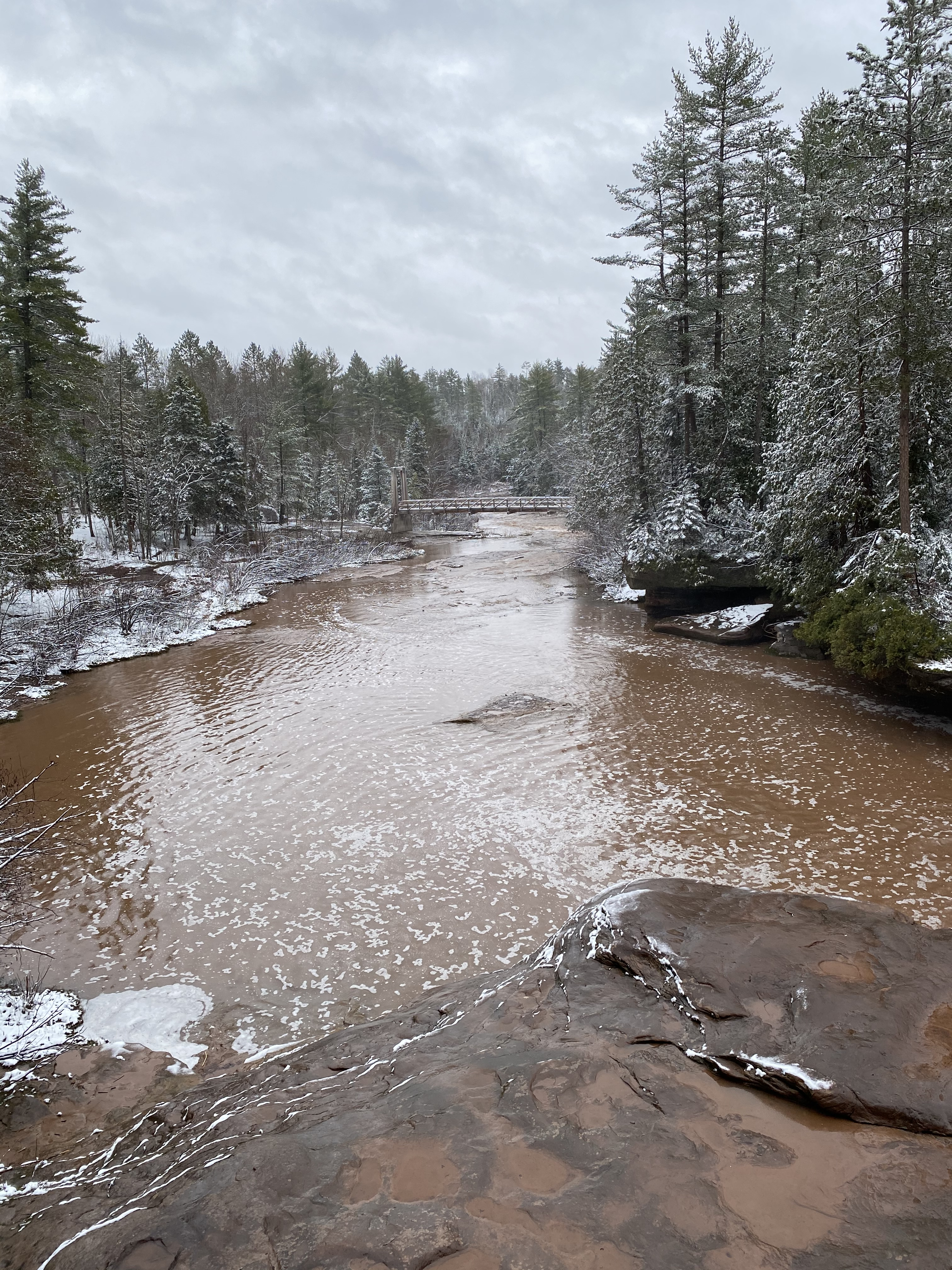
- The Baltimore River south of Rockland, Michigan near O Kun de Kun Falls.

Location
- Country: United States

Physical characteristics
- Source
  - location: Haight Township, Ontonagon County, Michigan
  - coordinates: 46.48605°N 89.15542°W
- Mouth
  - location: Ontonagon River, Michigan
  - coordinates: 46.6741°N 89.14264°W
  - elevation: 702 ft.

The Baltimore River is a 33.6-mile-long (54.1 km) river in Michigan. It originates in Ontonagon County and flows into the Middle Branch of the Ontonagon River and thence into Lake Superior. The O Kun de Kun Falls are located on the river.

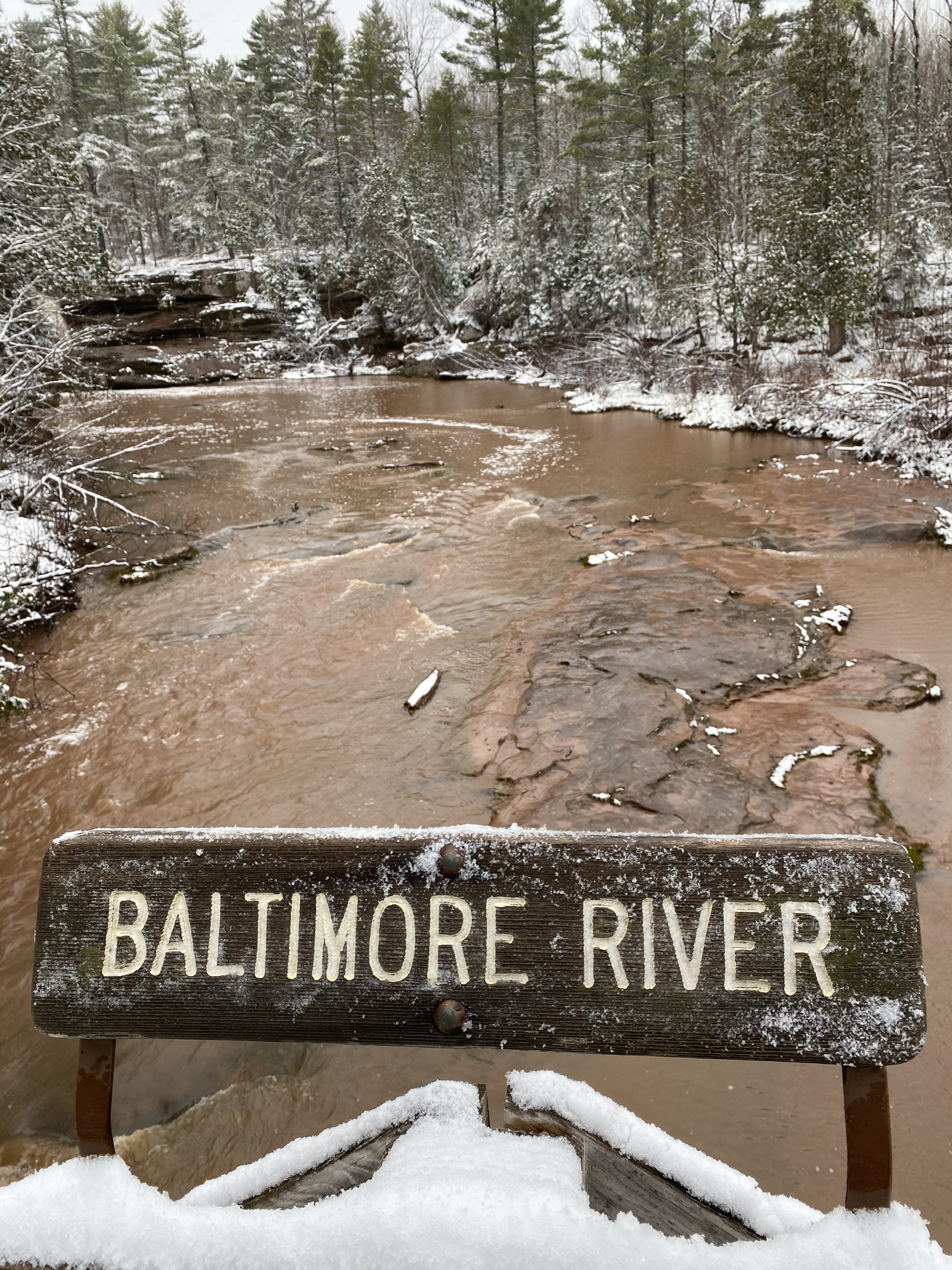
Baltimore River Sign.

== See also ==
- List of rivers of Michigan
