= Paulding, Michigan =

- Unincorporated community
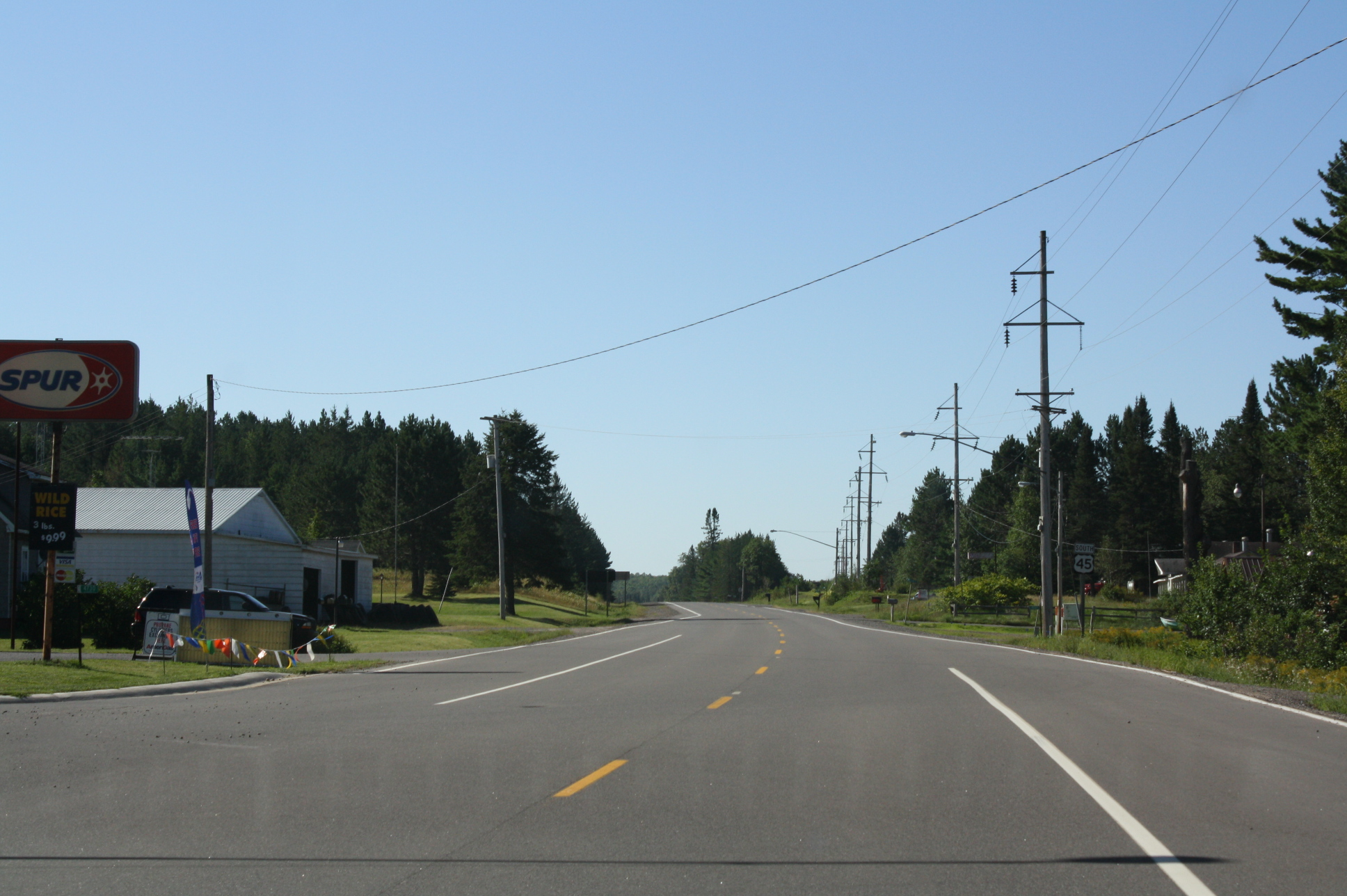
- Community of Paulding along U.S. Route 45

- Location within the state of Michigan Paulding (the United States)
- Coordinates: 46°24′05″N 89°10′48″W
- Country: United States
- State: Michigan
- County: Ontonagon
- Township: Haight
- Elevation: 1,358 ft (414 m)
- Time zone: UTC-5 (Eastern (EST))
  - Summer (DST): UTC-4 (EDT)
- ZIP code(s): 49912 (Bruce Crossing)
- Area code: 906
- GNIS feature ID: 1621164

Paulding is an unincorporated community in Ontonagon County in the U.S. state of Michigan. Paulding is located in Haight Township along U.S. Route 45, 13.5 miles (21.7 km) southeast of the village of Ontonagon. The Paulding Light, part of the area's folklore, is visible in a valley near Paulding.

== Climate ==
Climate data for Paulding, Michigan, 1991–2020 normals: 1367ft (417m)
Month	Jan	Feb	Mar	Apr	May	Jun	Jul	Aug	Sep	Oct	Nov	Dec	Year
Record high °F (°C)	49 (9)	56 (13)	65 (18)	78 (26)	90 (32)	94 (34)	93 (34)	90 (32)	88 (31)	83 (28)	74 (23)	53 (12)	94 (34)
Mean daily maximum °F (°C)	21.2 (−6.0)	25.0 (−3.9)	36.6 (2.6)	48.7 (9.3)	63.9 (17.7)	73.7 (23.2)	77.8 (25.4)	76.0 (24.4)	67.7 (19.8)	52.8 (11.6)	37.6 (3.1)	25.9 (−3.4)	50.6 (10.3)
Daily mean °F (°C)	11.8 (−11.2)	14.2 (−9.9)	24.1 (−4.4)	37.0 (2.8)	50.8 (10.4)	61.0 (16.1)	65.0 (18.3)	62.9 (17.2)	55.5 (13.1)	42.6 (5.9)	29.8 (−1.2)	17.9 (−7.8)	39.4 (4.1)
Mean daily minimum °F (°C)	2.3 (−16.5)	3.4 (−15.9)	11.6 (−11.3)	25.3 (−3.7)	37.7 (3.2)	48.2 (9.0)	52.1 (11.2)	49.7 (9.8)	43.2 (6.2)	32.4 (0.2)	22.0 (−5.6)	9.9 (−12.3)	28.1 (−2.1)
Record low °F (°C)	−29 (−34)	−33 (−36)	−31 (−35)	−8 (−22)	17 (−8)	27 (−3)	36 (2)	33 (1)	25 (−4)	9 (−13)	−9 (−23)	−24 (−31)	−33 (−36)
Average precipitation inches (mm)	1.48 (38)	1.19 (30)	1.65 (42)	2.84 (72)	3.36 (85)	3.73 (95)	3.97 (101)	3.31 (84)	3.62 (92)	3.73 (95)	2.29 (58)	1.75 (44)	32.92 (836)
Average snowfall inches (cm)	27.0 (69)	23.7 (60)	10.5 (27)	14.7 (37)	0.6 (1.5)	0.0 (0.0)	trace	trace	trace	4.6 (12)	21.6 (55)	24.4 (62)	127.1 (323.5)
Source 1: NOAA
Source 2: XMACIS (snowfall & records)

== History ==
A post office called Paulding was established in 1893, and remained in operation until it was discontinued in 1971. The community was named for John Paulding, a militiaman in the American Revolution.

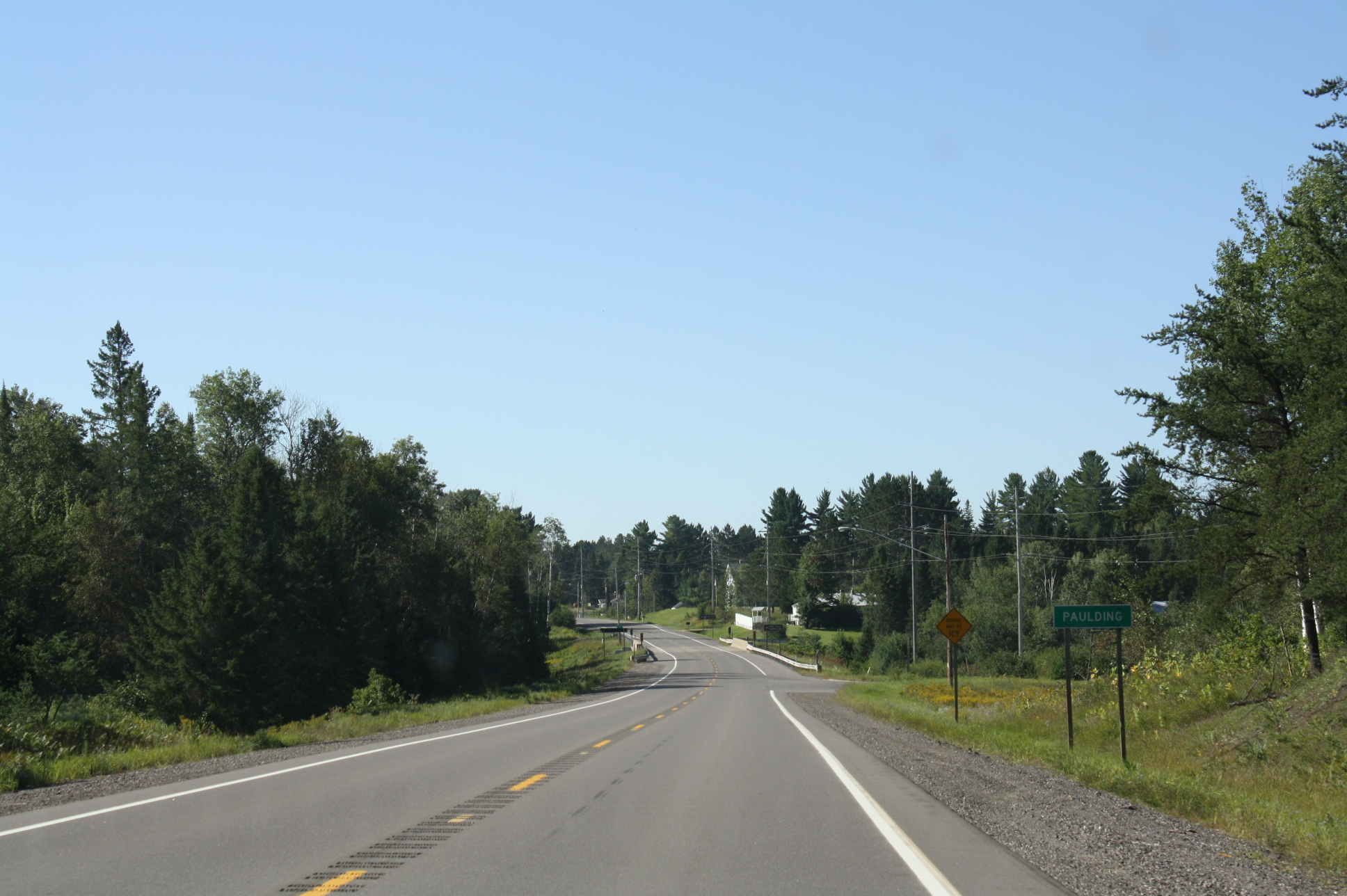
Paulding sign
