= Sylvania Wilderness =

Wilderness area in Michigan, United States

- IUCN category Ib (wilderness area)
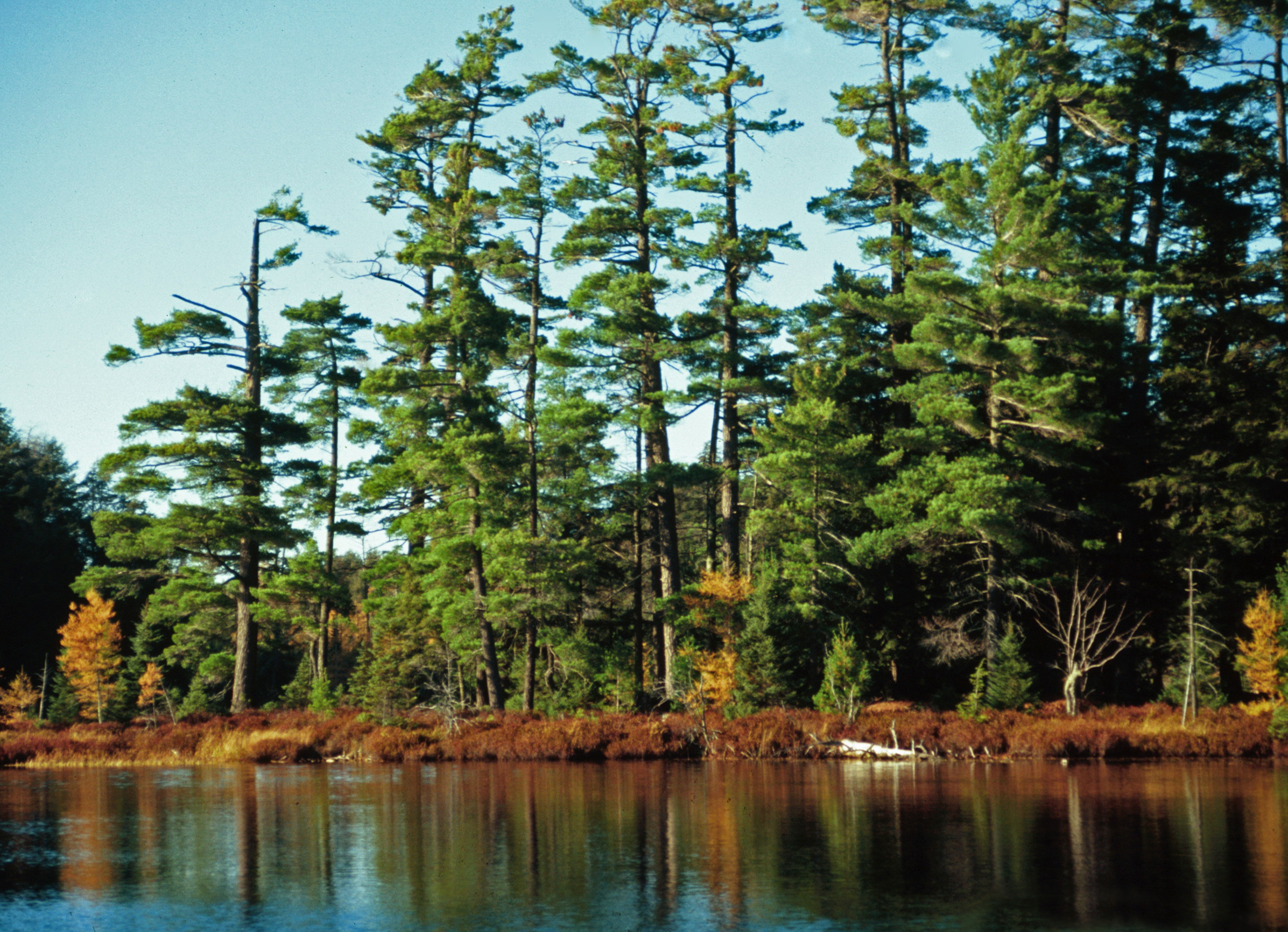
- Katherine Lake

- Location within the United States
- Location: Gogebic County, Michigan, United States
- Nearest city: Wakefield, Michigan
- Coordinates: 46°12′58″N 89°17′53″W
- Area: 18,327 acres (7,417 ha)
- Established: 1987
- Governing body: U.S. Forest Service
- Website: www.fs.fed.us/r9/ottawa/recreation/wilderness/

Sylvania Wilderness is an 18,327 acres (7,417 ha) protected area located a few miles west of Watersmeet Township, in the western part of the Upper Peninsula of Michigan. Sylvania is located entirely within the bounds of the Ottawa National Forest and is currently being managed as a wilderness area as part of the National Wilderness Preservation System by the U.S. Forest Service. Within its borders lie 34 lakes set against a backdrop of old-growth forest. It represents one of only a handful of such areas left in the Midwestern United States.

== History ==
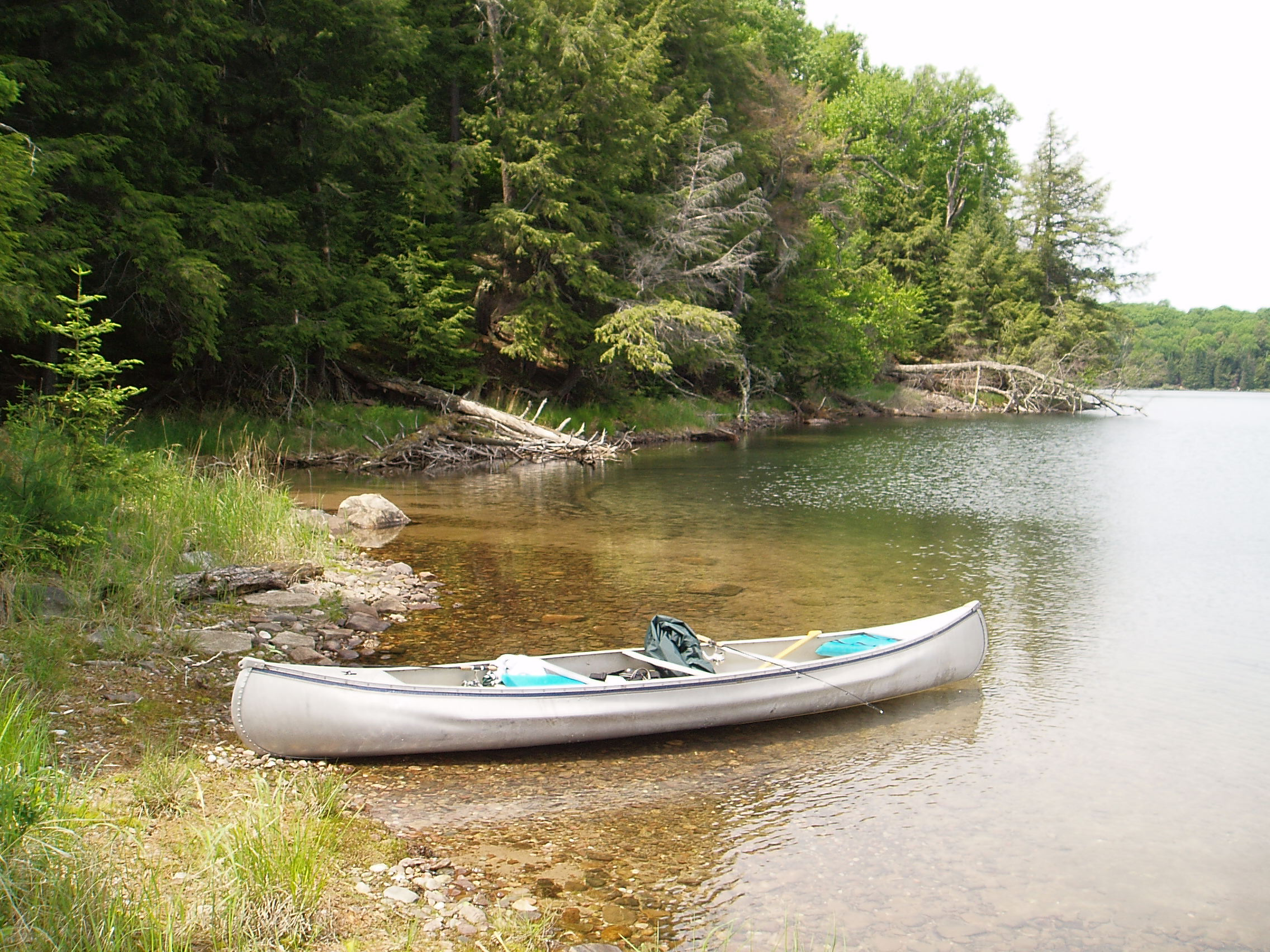
Loon Lake

Little is known of the area prior to the late 19th century, other than the area was frequently used by clans of Ojibwe Native Americans, as evidenced by the few scattered artifacts that have been found there. In 1895 Wisconsin lumberman A.D. Johnston purchased 80 acres (32 ha) of land at the south end of Clark Lake with the intent to cut the large pines located there. Upon seeing the land for himself, he was so taken by the rugged beauty of it that he changed his mind and decided to preserve it. He invited friends, many of whom were equally impressed and so moved to purchase adjacent lands, and after some time the Sylvania Club was formed, with fishing, hunting, and hiking being the main focus. The owners built lodges and cabins on the larger lakes, and the area became an exclusive resort for a small number of affluent and influential guests. Ownership changed hands over the years, and the entire area was purchased by the United States Forest Service in 1967, which promptly removed all buildings and began managing it as a special recreation area. In 1987, it was designated as a federal wilderness when the Michigan Wilderness Act was passed by Congress and signed into law by Ronald Reagan.

== Geography ==
Sylvania straddles the divide between the Lake Superior and the Mississippi River drainage systems, occupying some of the highest ground in the Midwestern United States. Many of the lakes in the park are more than 1,700 feet (520 m) above sea-level. Because of this apex position, these deep, clear lakes are primarily landlocked, fed by springs and local run-off. There are no surface streams entering the park, which is one of the reasons the lakes remain pristine and pure. For this same reason, the lakes are a bit "fragile" (low flush rates, low nutrient loads, etc.). Special fishing regulations on these lakes, including catch and release for all bass, have helped to preserve the lakes' fisheries. The Sylvania Wilderness also features 25 miles (40 km) of hiking trails and portages within its 30 square miles (78 km^{2}). Soils are mostly classic podzol sandy loam or loamy sand developed on glacial till or outwash. Among the most common soil series are Gogebic, Karlin and Keeweenaw.

There are 50 designated campsites in 29 locations throughout the wilderness, each with rudimentary amenities such as outdoor toilets, tent pads, pack racks (for keeping foodstuffs out of reach of wildlife), and fire-grills.

== Flora and fauna ==
The old-growth northern hardwood forests in this wilderness are some of the most extensive in North America, nearly spanning the entire park at some 15,000 acres (6,100 ha). Sugar maple, eastern hemlock, and yellow birch are the most common trees, found along with white, red, and jack pine, white spruce, balsam fir, and paper birch.

Wildlife abounds in the park, with white-tailed deer, black bear, grey wolves, porcupine, bobcat, beaver, otter, coyote, fox, bald eagle, loon, osprey, and many others.

== List of major lakes in Sylvania ==
- Big Bateau Lake
- Clark Lake
- Clear Lake
- Crooked Lake
- Deer Island Lake
- Devils Head Lake
- Dream Lake
- East Bear Lake
- Fisher Lake
- Florence Lake
- Glimmerglass Lake
- Helen Lake
- High Lake
- Indian Lake
- Katherine Lake
- Little Duck Lake
- Long Lake
- Loon Lake
- Marsh Lake
- Moss Lake
- Mountain Lake
- Snap Jack Lake
- West Bear Lake
- Whitefish Lake
