= Haight Township, Michigan =

- Civil township
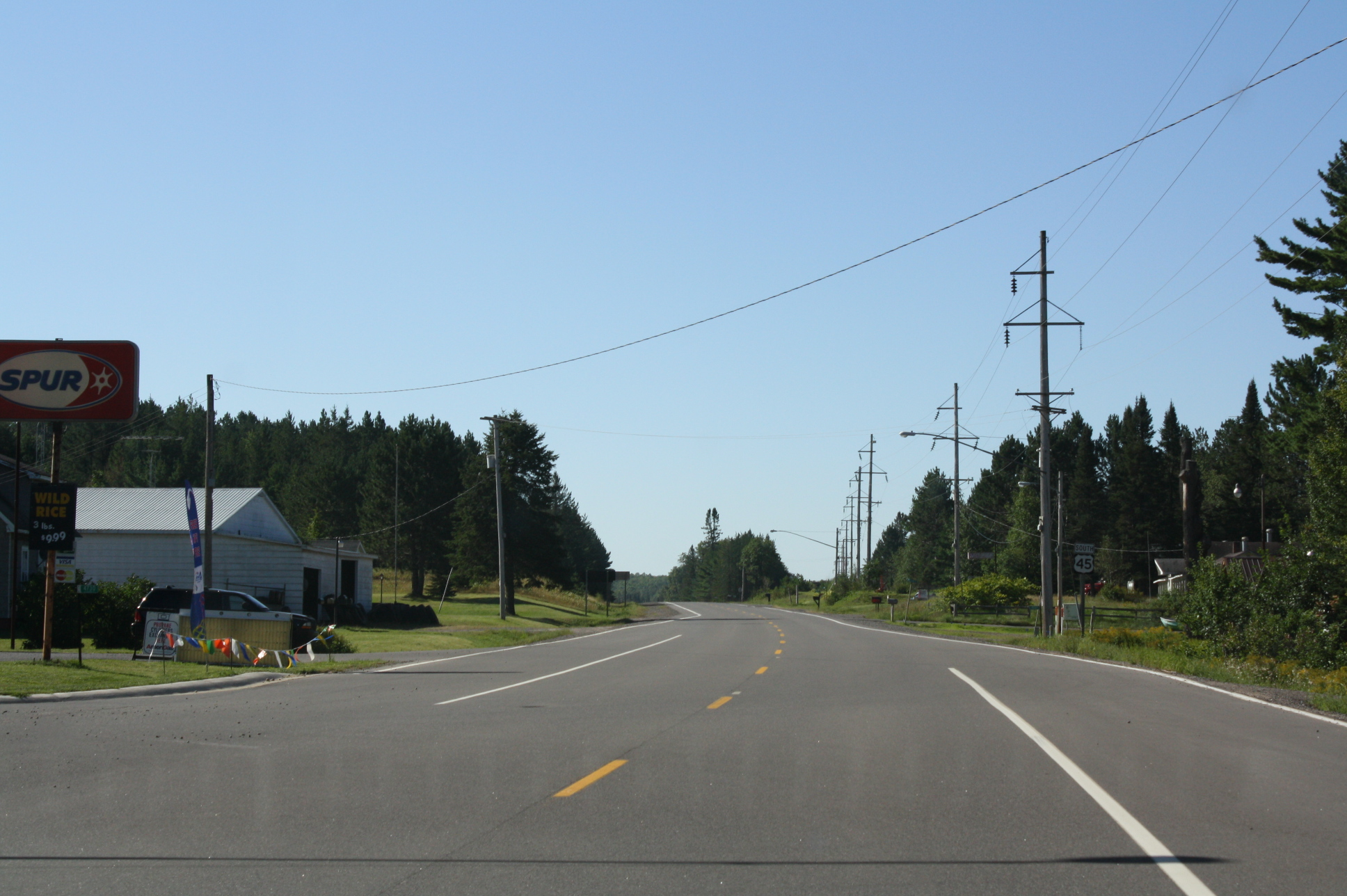
- Unincorporated community of Paulding

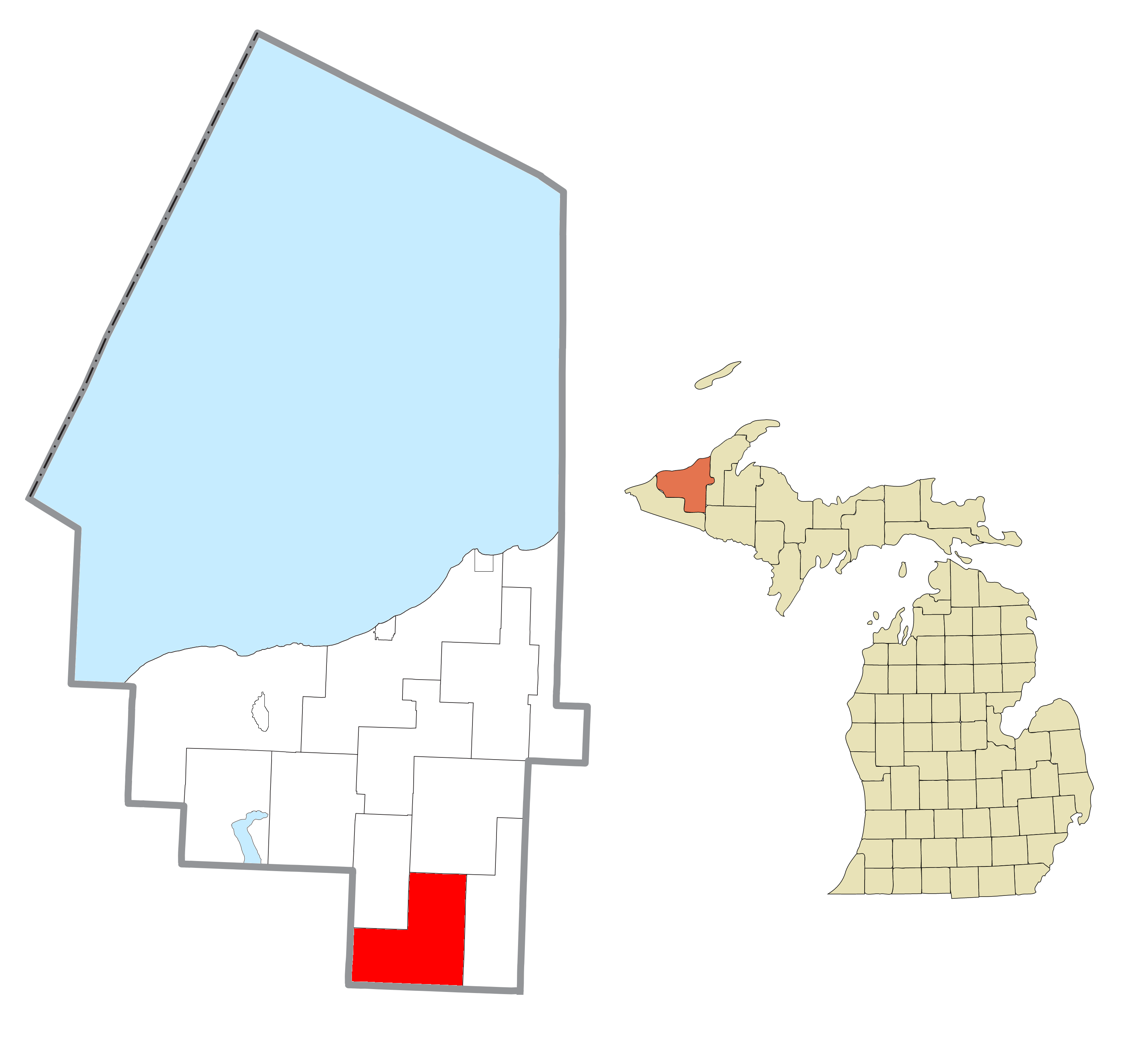
- Location within Ontonagon County

- Location within the state of Michigan Haight Township (the United States)
- Coordinates: 46°22′51″N 89°12′26″W
- Country: United States
- State: Michigan
- County: Ontonagon

Government
  - Supervisor: Joseph Pietila
  - Clerk: Steve Aho

Area
  - Total: 107.04 sq mi (277.2 km^{2})
  - Land: 105.74 sq mi (273.9 km^{2})
  - Water: 1.30 sq mi (3.4 km^{2})
- Elevation: 1,512 ft (461 m)

Population (2020)
  - Total: 203
  - Density: 2.01/sq mi (0.78/km^{2})
- Time zone: UTC-5 (Eastern (EST))
  - Summer (DST): UTC-4 (EDT)
- ZIP code(s): 49912 (Bruce Crossing); 49925 (Ewen); 49967 (Trout Creek); 49969 (Watersmeet)
- Area code: 906
- FIPS code: 26-35960
- GNIS feature ID: 1626419

Haight Township is a civil township of Ontonagon County in the U.S. state of Michigan. The population was 203 at the 2020 census.

== Geography ==
According to the United States Census Bureau, the township has a total area of 107.04 square miles (277.23 km^{2}), of which 105.74 square miles (273.87 km^{2}) is land and 1.30 square miles (3.37 km^{2}) (1.21%) is water.

=== Communities ===
- Paulding is an unincorporated community within the township.
