= Bruce Crossing, Michigan =

- Census-designated place (CDP) & unincorporated community
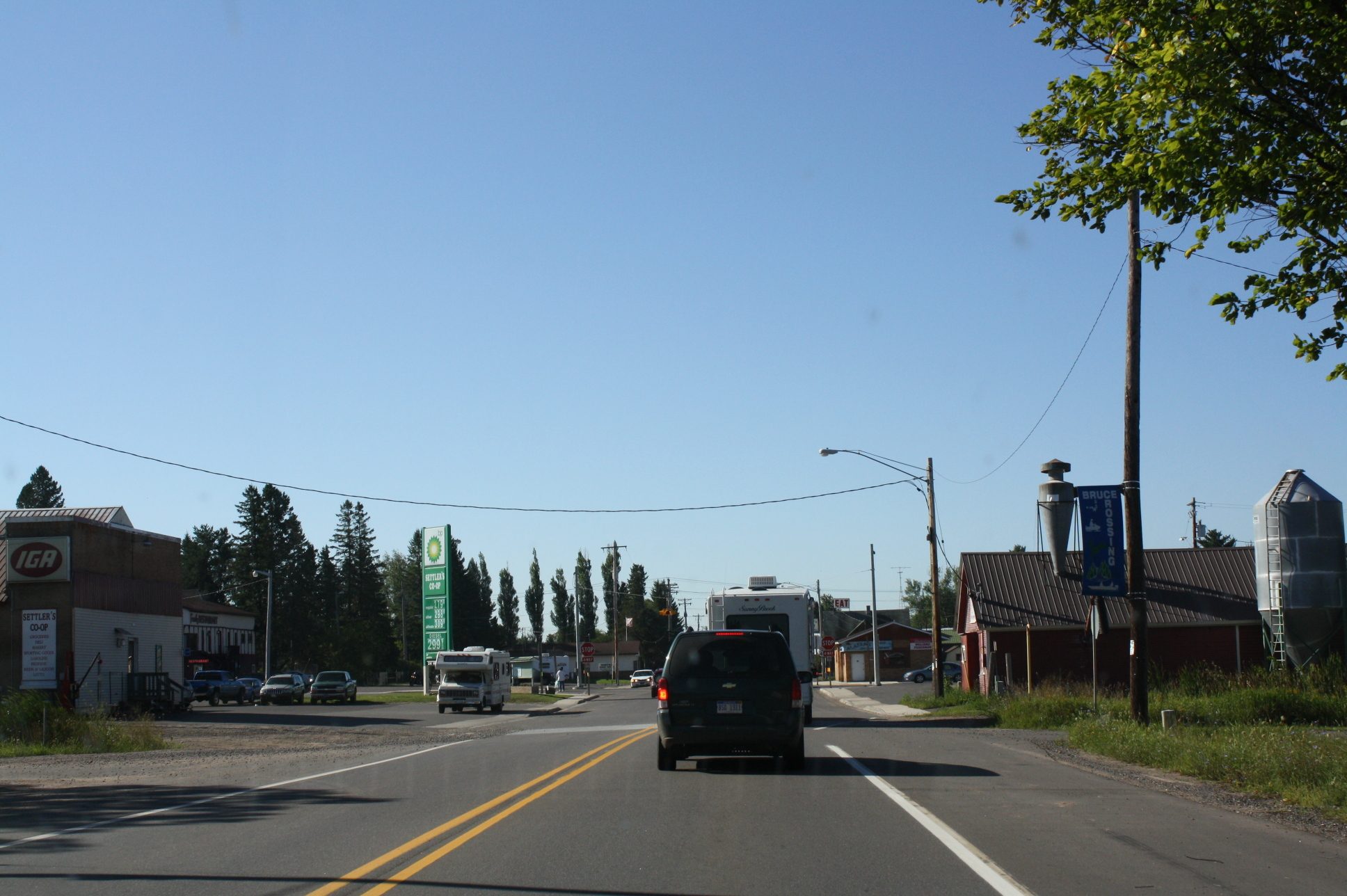
- Looking south along US 45 toward M-28

- Location within the state of Michigan Location within the United States
- Coordinates: 46°32′06″N 89°10′44″W
- Country: United States
- State: Michigan
- County: Ontonagon
- Township: Stannard
- Settled: 1886

Area
  - Total: 4.51 sq mi (11.68 km^{2})
  - Land: 4.51 sq mi (11.68 km^{2})
  - Water: 0 sq mi (0.00 km^{2})
- Elevation: 1,138 ft (347 m)

Population (2020)
  - Total: 184
  - Density: 40.8/sq mi (15.8/km^{2})
- Time zone: UTC-5 (Eastern (EST))
  - Summer (DST): UTC-4 (EDT)
- ZIP Code(s): 49912
- Area code: 906
- GNIS feature ID: 622123

Bruce Crossing is an unincorporated community in Ontonagon County in the U.S. state of Michigan. Bruce Crossing is located in Stannard Township at the junction of U.S. Highway 45 and M-28, 24.5 miles (39.4 km) south-southeast of the village of Ontonagon. The community has a post office with the 49912 ZIP Code.

As of the 2020 census, Bruce Crossing had a population of 184.

== History ==
Bruce Crossing was first settled by August Neuman, who built a sawmill at the location. The community was originally named Bruce's Crossing when its post office opened on March 5, 1888. The name came from the first postmaster, Donald M. Bruce, who owned a store at the crossing of the Duluth, South Shore and Atlantic Railway and the old Military Road. It was shortened to Bruce Crossing on August 13, 1891.

== Climate ==
July is typically the warmest month in Bruce Crossing, when highs average 77 °F (25 °C) and lows average 53 °F (12 °C). January is coldest, when the high temperatures average 19 °F (−7 °C) and the lows average −1 °F (−18 °C). The highest recorded temperature was 97 °F (36 °C) in 1975, and the lowest was −43 °F (−42 °C) in 1951.

== Demographics ==
Historical population
Census	Pop.	Note	%±
2020	184		—
U.S. Decennial Census

== Gallery ==
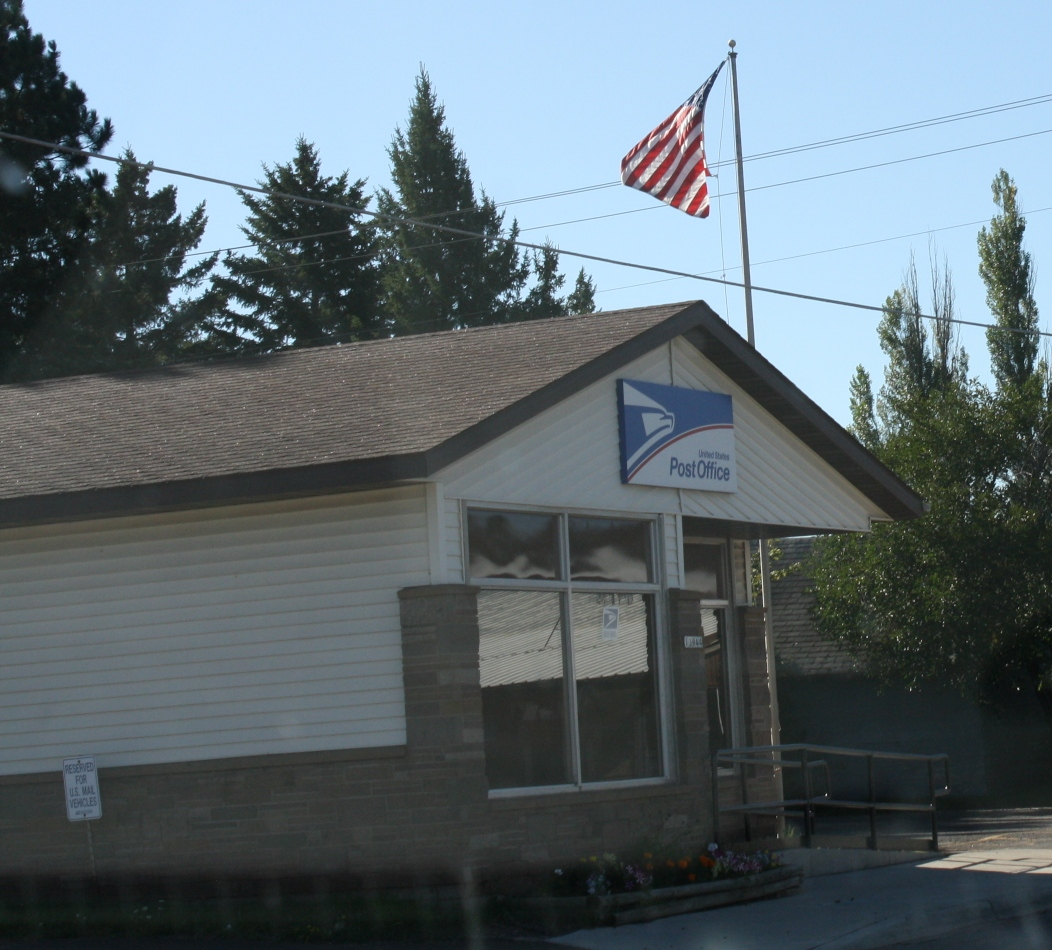
Bruce Crossing post office

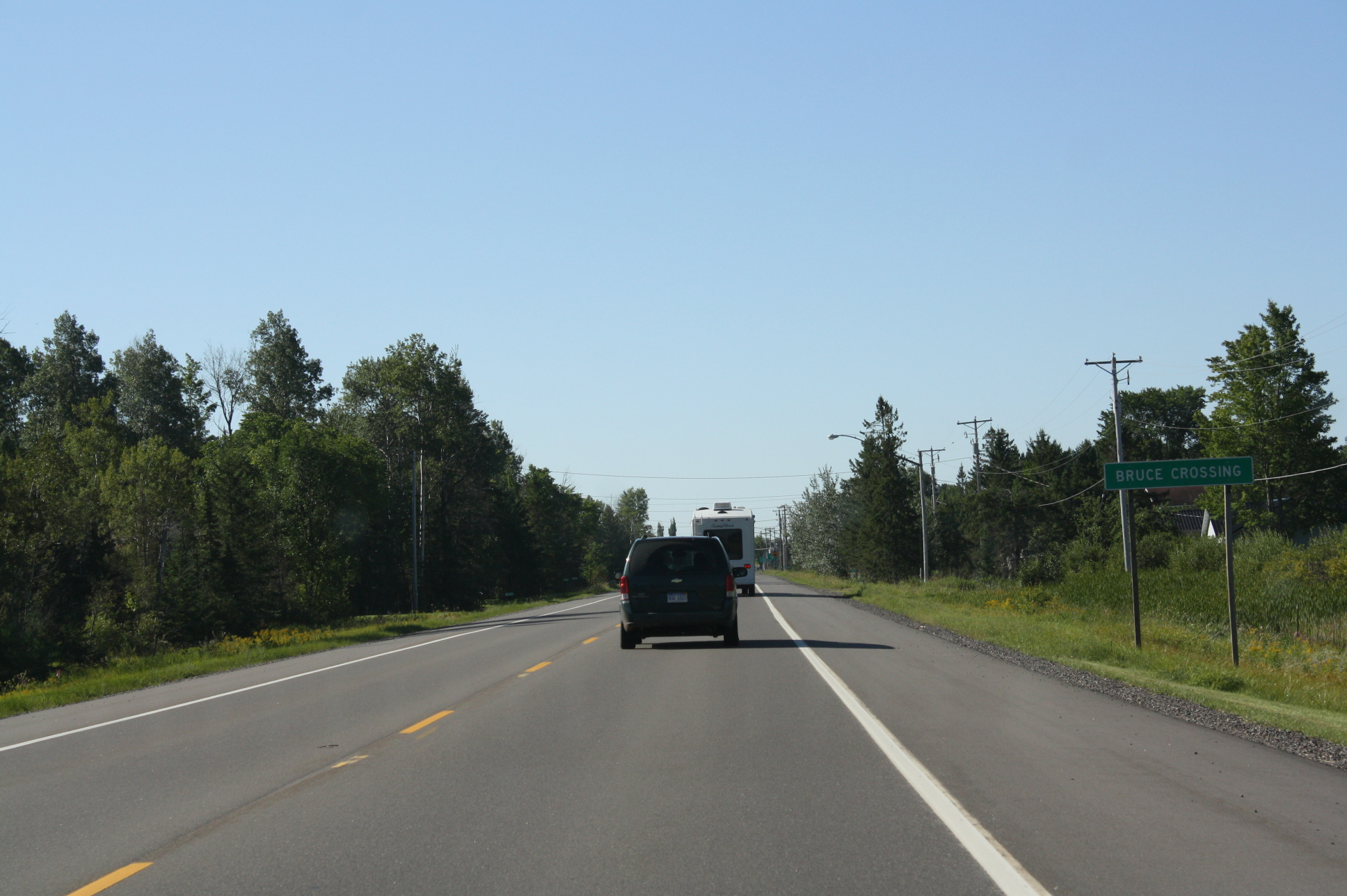
Bruce Crossing sign on US 45

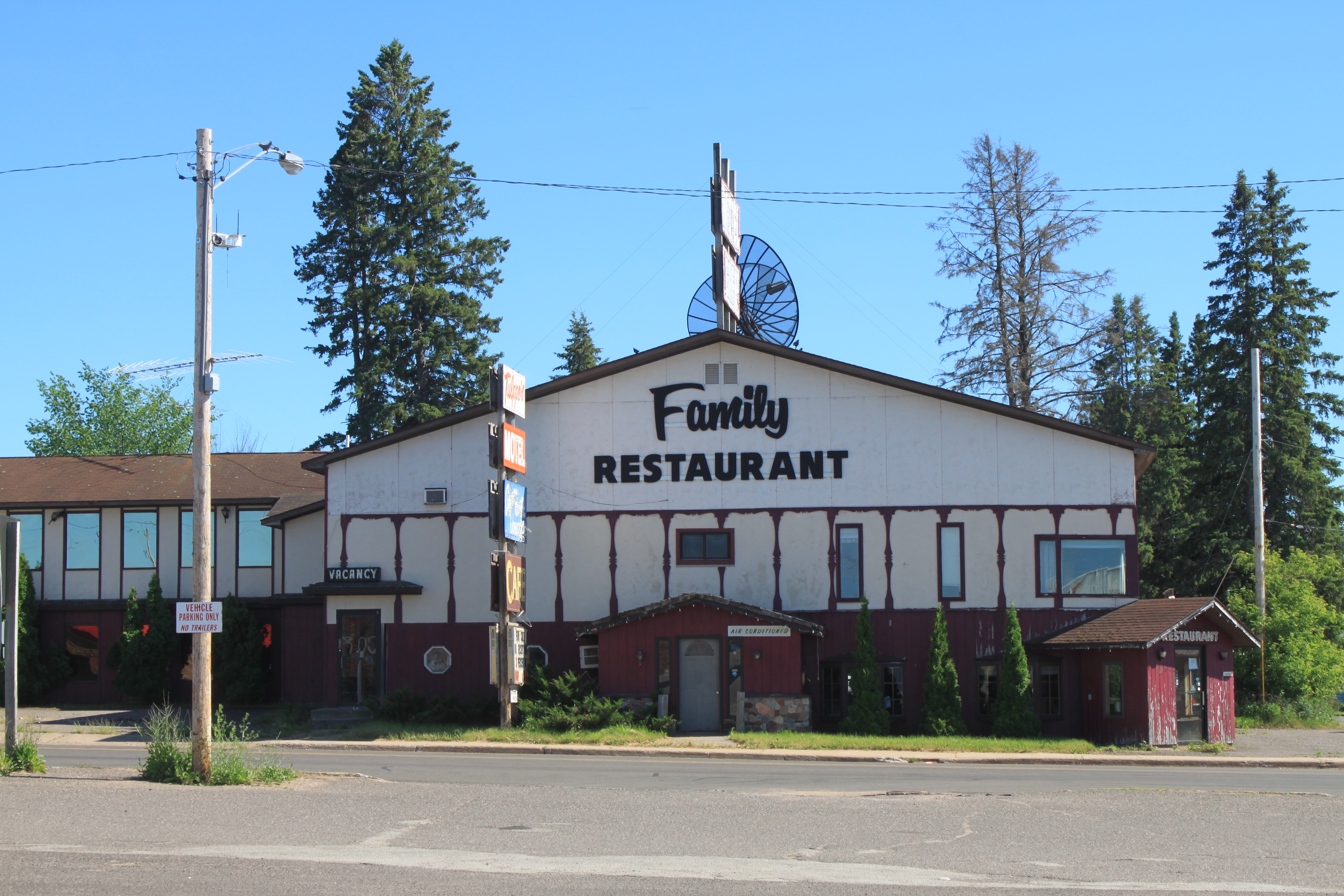
Tulppo's Restaurant in Bruce Crossing
