= Ottawa National Forest =

National forest in Michigan, United States

- IUCN category VI (protected area with sustainable use of natural resources)
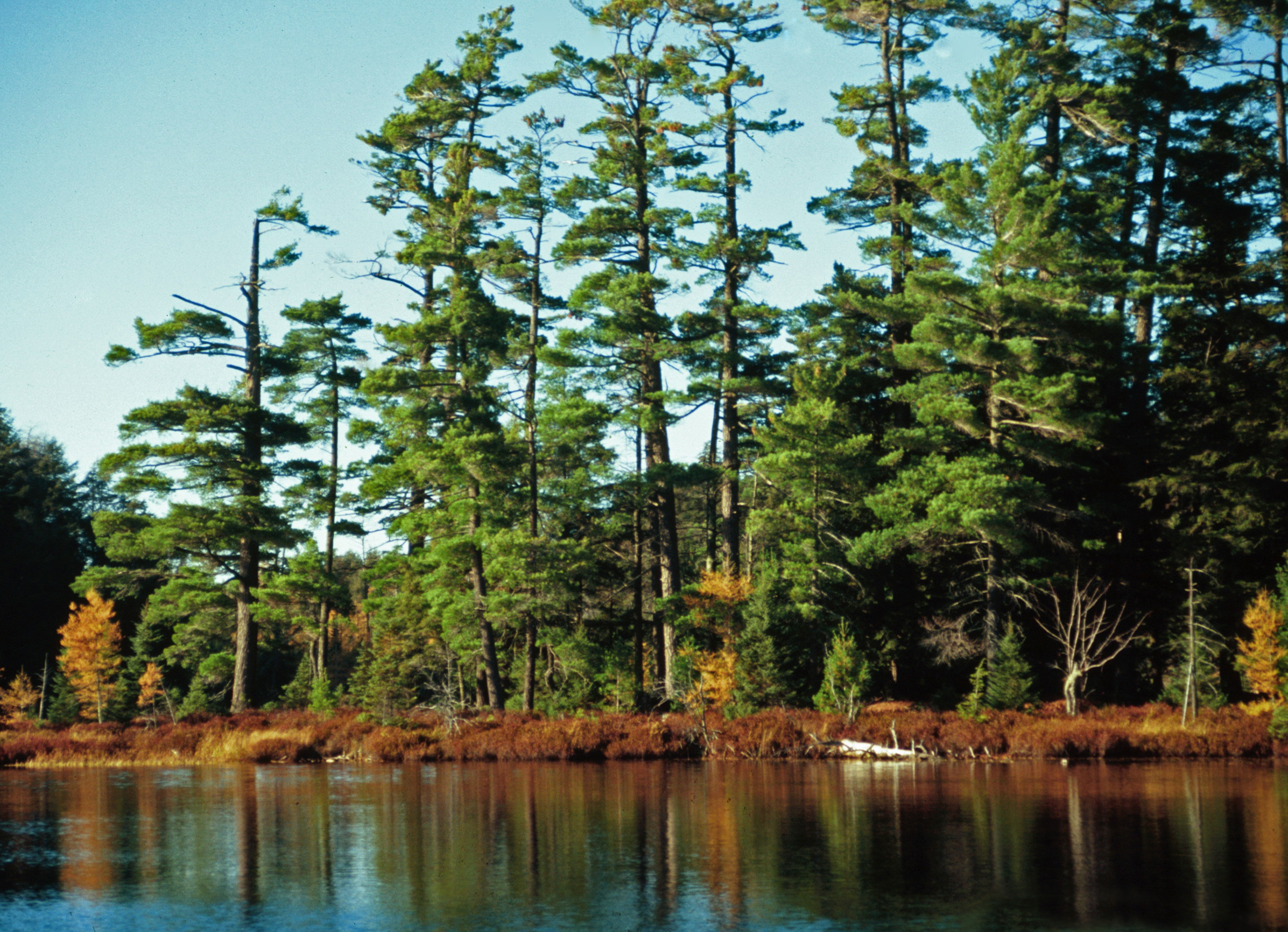
- Pinus strobus, Katherine Lake. Ottawa National Forest, Sylvania Wilderness, Michigan

- Map showing National Forests in Michigan.
- Location: Upper Peninsula, Michigan, United States
- Nearest city: Ironwood, Michigan
- Coordinates: 46.23°N 88.95°W
- Area: 993,010 acres (4,020 km^{2})
- Established: January 27, 1931
- Governing body: U.S. Forest Service
- Website: www.fs.usda.gov/r09/ottawa

The Ottawa National Forest is a national forest that covers 993,010 acres (401,860 ha) in the Upper Peninsula of the U.S. state of Michigan. It includes much of Gogebic and Ontonagon counties, as well as slices of Iron, Houghton, Baraga, and Marquette counties. The forest is under the jurisdiction of the U.S. Forest Service.

The headquarters are in Ironwood, Michigan, on the Wisconsin border, and the principal visitor center is located in Watersmeet, Michigan, in the southern section of the Forest. These and other towns within and adjacent to the Forest are served by U.S. Highway 2, one of the principal highways of the Western Upper Peninsula. There are local ranger district offices in Bessemer, Iron River, Kenton, Ontonagon, and Watersmeet.

== Topography ==
Wooded slopes mark the south shore of Lake Superior within the Ottawa National Forest, particularly within the Black River country between Little Girl's Point and the Presque Isle River.

As the Black River, a National Wild and Scenic River, falls from near Copper Peak down towards the lake, it tumbles over seven separate mapped and named waterfalls. The Presque Isle river and its major tributary, Copper Creek, have eleven waterfalls, although four of the Presque Isle falls are outside the national forest and are located within the boundaries of the adjacent Porcupine Mountains Wilderness State Park.

Underwood Hill, at 1,867 feet (569 m) in altitude (more than 1,200 feet (370 m) above the level of nearby Lake Superior) is the highest elevation in the Presque Isle River drainage area. However, this is not the highest point in the national forest. That honor belongs to an unnamed 1,900-foot (580 m) hill north of Lac Vieux Desert in southeastern Gogebic County. Rain or snow that falls on the north side of this hill flows through the Ontonagon River towards Lake Superior; precipitation on the south side flows through the Wisconsin River to the Gulf of Mexico.

== Climate ==
The Ottawa National Forest is an area of relatively high precipitation in both winter and summer. Sections of the Forest receive more than 200 inches (500 cm) of snow annually. In winter, Lake Superior, which usually does not freeze over, is itself the source of much of the water vapor that falls in the area. In many of the summer months, moist air carried by southerly winds from the faraway Gulf does not fall below the dew point in temperature until it enters the Lake Superior basin.

The forested area is rich in water but poor in topsoil. The glaciers of various Ice Ages, including the most recent Wisconsonian glaciation, scraped much of the forested area down to bare rock or sand. The result is a highly characteristic boreal forest ecosystem.

== History ==
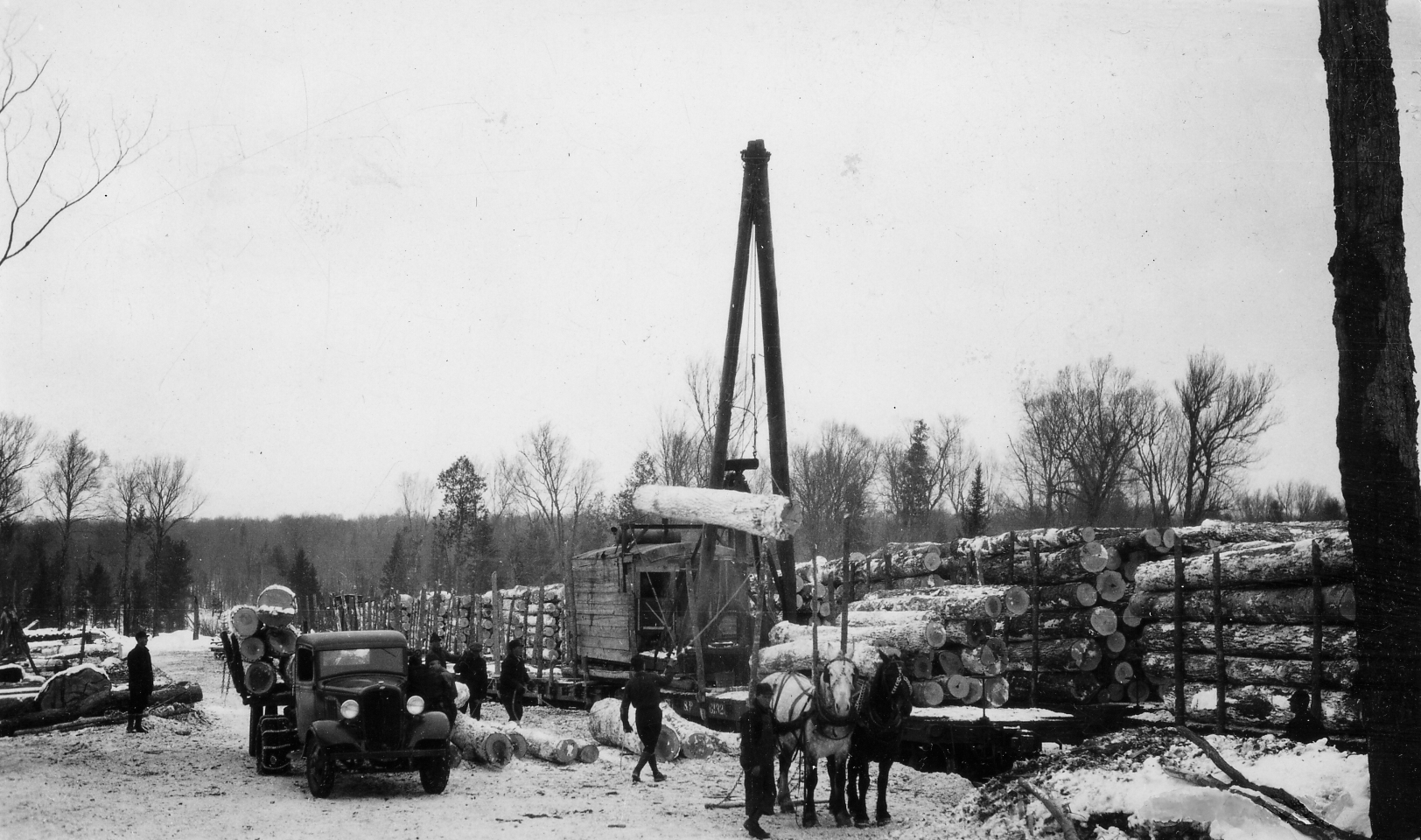
Logging is a significant activity in the national forest.

The Ottawa National Forest is home to several clans of the Ojibwa people who coexisted with the Forest's numerous rocky wetlands. They harvested many of the region's mammals, particularly beaver, for their pelts, and sold them to traders from Canada and the eastern United States, such as the traders of the American Fur Company. After the fur trade declined, the nation sold most of the forest in the 1854 Treaty of La Pointe. A part of the nation used some of the proceeds from their fur trapping to purchase lands around Lac Vieux Desert, where their descendants remain today as the Lac Vieux Desert Band of Lake Superior Chippewa.

As a result of the construction of the Duluth, South Shore and Atlantic Railway in 1892–1894, the forest was opened to logging. A few parcels of old-growth white pine and red pine remain.

After the logging era ended, the heavily exploited forest was partly abandoned. The U.S. federal government established the Ottawa National Forest in 1931, but the forest did not reach its full size until after two large land purchases in 1933 and 1935. In 1935 the national forest reached its maximum size of 1,026,329 acres (4,105 km^{2}). After some privatizations, the Forest reached its current 1.0 million acre (4,000 km^{2}) extent.

During the years after World War II, growing automobile tourism made it possible for a wider variety of people to visit the forest.

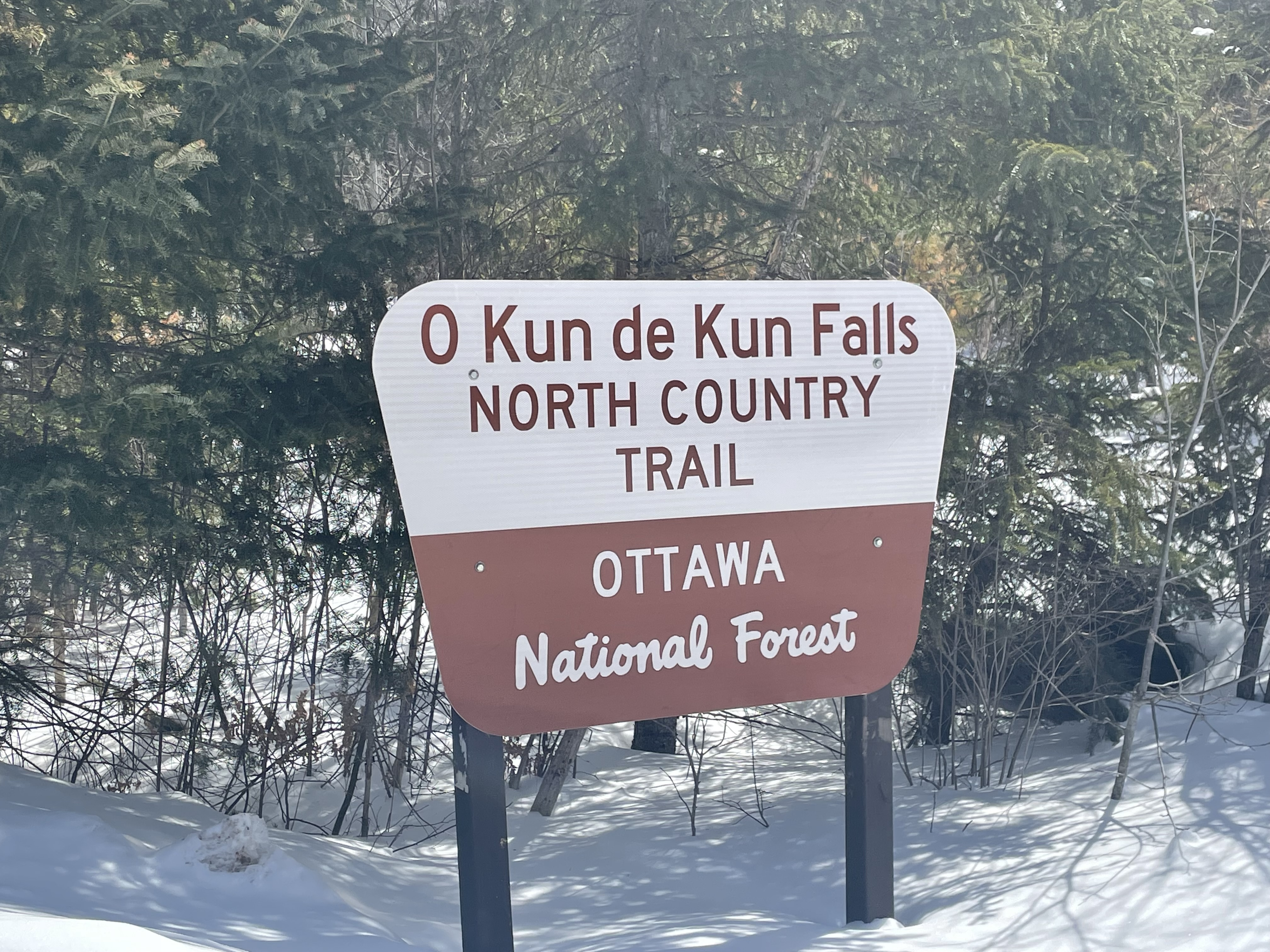
Sign at the entrance to O Kun de Kun Falls, located within the forest.

== Recreation ==
Ottawa National Forest is used for fishing, canoeing, and lake kayaking. In winter, the Forest welcomes cross-country skiers and snowmobilers.

The Ottawa National Forest contains three designated U.S. wilderness areas, managed as such by the Forest Service. They are McCormick Wilderness and the Sturgeon River Gorge Wilderness near Kenton, Michigan, and the Sylvania Wilderness near Watersmeet, Michigan.

The North Country Trail runs through the forest. Hikers can use the trail to access O Kun de Kun Falls.

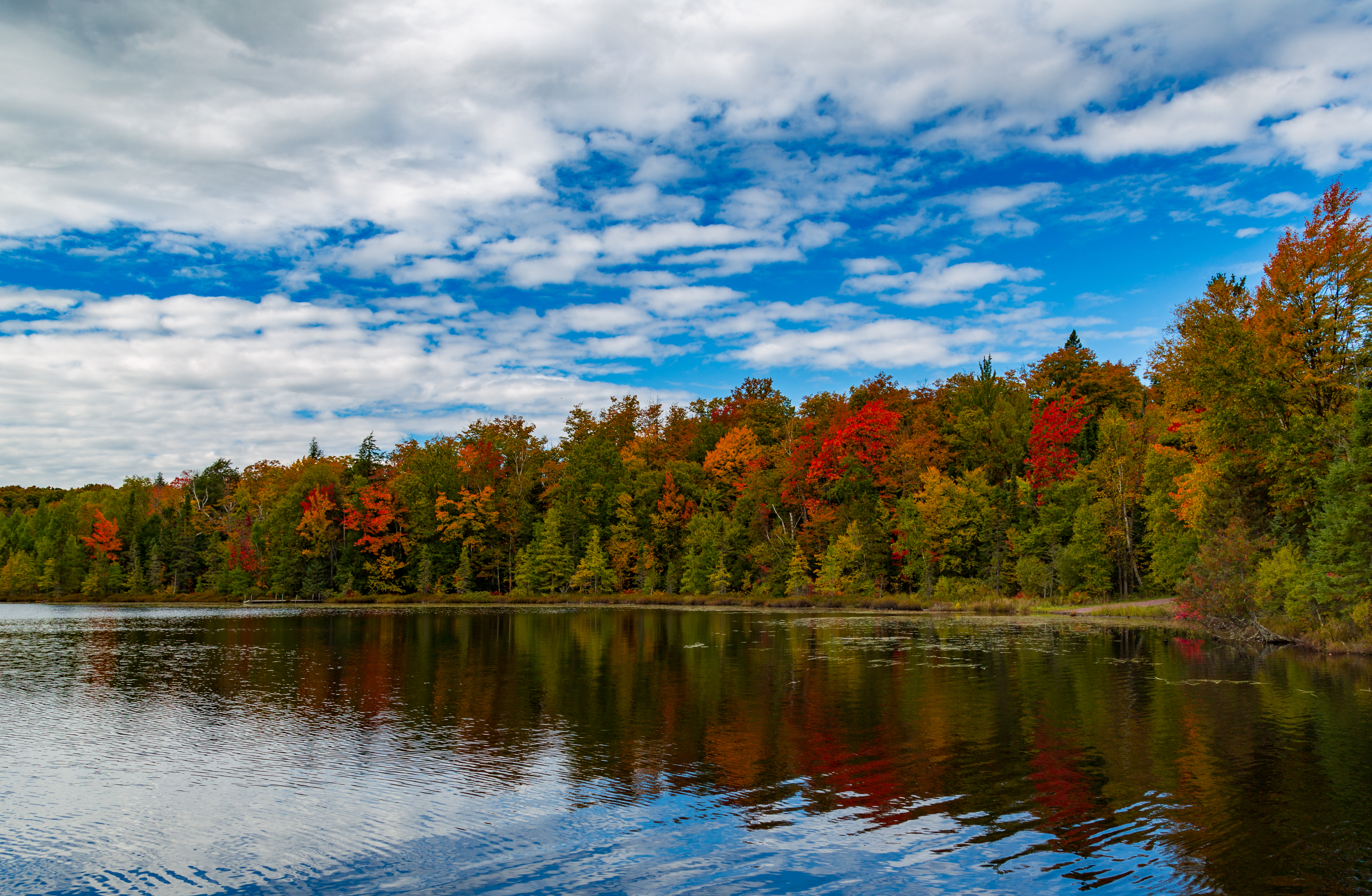
Fall colors on Henry Lake in Gogebic County

== Ottawa Visitor Center ==
Opened in 1971, the Ottawa Visitor Center offers interpretive programs and exhibits about the natural history and resources of the Forest. The center's mission is to guide visitors to safe, wise and caring use of the Forest.

== See also ==
- List of national forests of the United States
