= M-64 (Michigan highway) =

State highway in Gogebic and Ontonagon counties in Michigan, United States

M-64
- M-64 highlighted in red

Route information
- Maintained by MDOT
- Length: 63.765 mi (102.620 km)
- Existed: 1930–present
- Tourist routes: Lake Superior Circle Tour

Major junctions
- South end: CTH-B near Presque Isle, WI
- US 2 in Marenisco; M-28 in Bergland
- North end: US 45 / M-38 in Ontonagon

Location
- Country: United States
- State: Michigan
- Counties: Gogebic, Ontonagon

Highway system
- Michigan State Trunkline Highway System; Interstate; US; State; Byways
| ← M-63 | → M-65 |

M-64 is a north–south state trunkline highway in the Upper Peninsula of the US state of Michigan. It runs for approximately 63 3/4 miles (102.6 km) through the western part of the state in land that is part of the Ottawa National Forest. The highway connects with County Trunk Highway B (CTH-B) at the state line near Presque Isle, Wisconsin. As it passes through dense forests, M-64 runs along lakes Gogebic and Superior. The northern end is at a junction with US Highway 45 (US 45) in Ontonagon.

The M-64 designation was used on two other separate highways before it was used for the current highway. The first was at the other end of the state near the Ohio state line, and the second was on the Keweenaw Peninsula near Eagle Harbor. The current highway has carried the M-64 moniker since 1930, when it was assigned along two disconnected highways. These two parts were joined into a single corridor soon after. M-64 was one of the last highways in the state of Michigan to be paved in 1961. In the early part of the 21st century, the state replaced the bridge over the Ontonagon River and shifted the highway's northern terminus.

== Route description ==
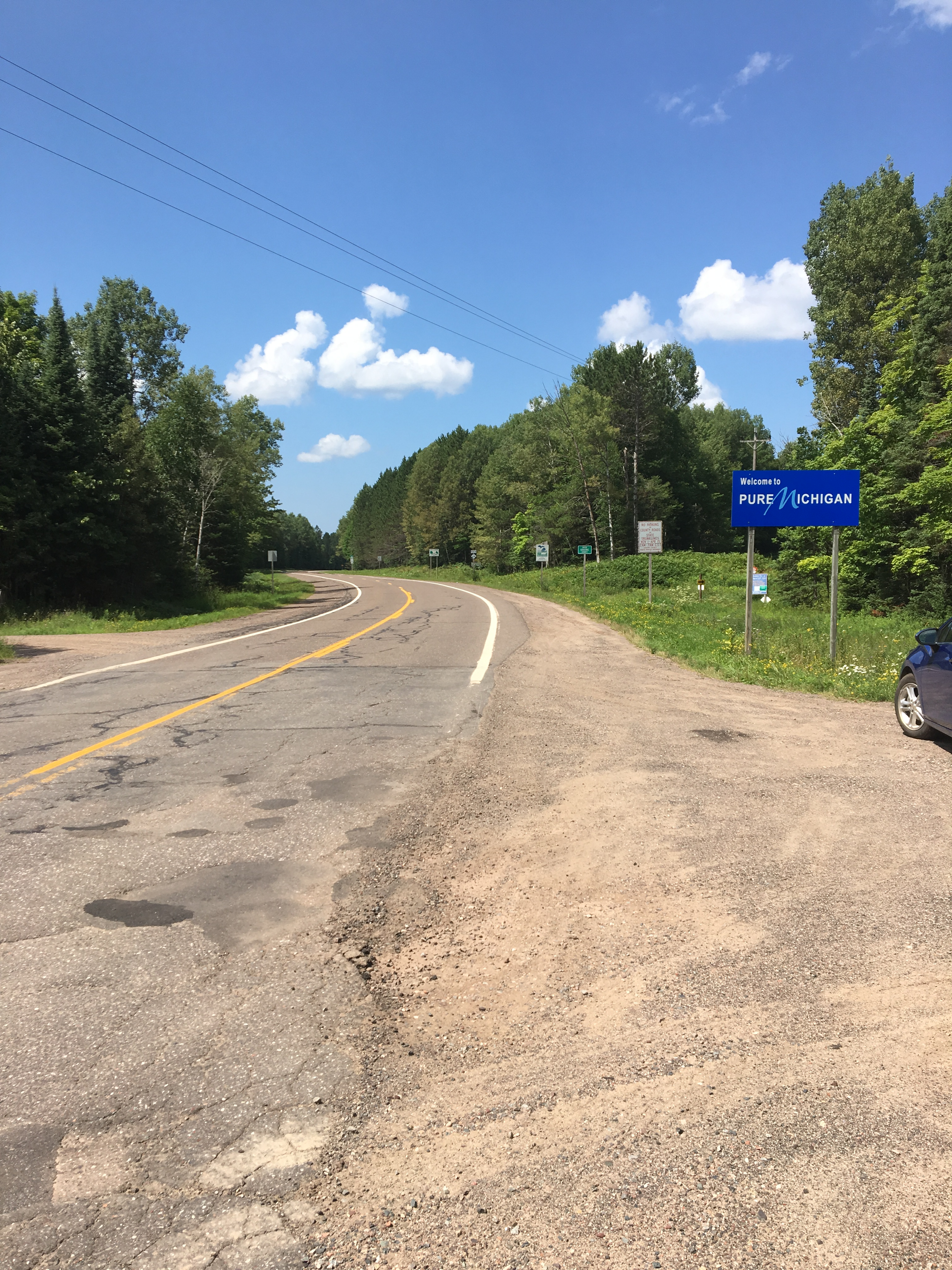
State line crossing north of Presque Isle

M-64 starts at the Wisconsin state line north of Presque Isle, Wisconsin, where it runs north as the continuation of CTH-;B into the state of Michigan. The trunkline runs through dense forests along the Presque Isle River in a rural area of Gogebic County; this region is a part of the Ottawa National Forest. As the highway enters the community of Marenisco, it follows Pine and Fair avenues through town. On the north side of Marenisco, M-64 turns easterly and runs concurrently with US 2 for about two miles (3.2 km) including a crossing of the Presque Isle River. East of town, M-64 separates from US 2 and turns northeasterly toward the southern end of Lake Gogebic. The road turns north along the western shore of the lake and provides access to Lake Gogebic State Park. About halfway along the lakeshore, the highway crosses into Ontonagon County and from the Central to the Eastern time zone.

At Merriweather, M-64 turns easterly again, this time merging with M-28 and becoming a part of the Lake Superior Circle Tour. The two highways run together along the northern end of Lake Gogebic to Bergland. Turning north once again, M-64 crosses a branch line of the Canadian National Railway. The highway runs through more dense forests parallel to the Big Iron River on this north–south leg. The trunkline leaves the national forest as it passes into the community of White Pine, and the road runs near a former copper mine in the area. M-64 approaches the shores of Lake Superior at Silver City. There, it meets the eastern terminus of the former M-107, a highway designation that ran west into the Porcupine Mountains along the current 107th Engineers Memorial Highway. M-64 turns east along Lake Superior following the shoreline to the outskirts of Ontonagon. The highway crosses the Ontonagon River and terminates on the eastern shore. The current intersection with US 45 that marks the end of M-64 on the south side of downtown is also the western terminus of M-38.

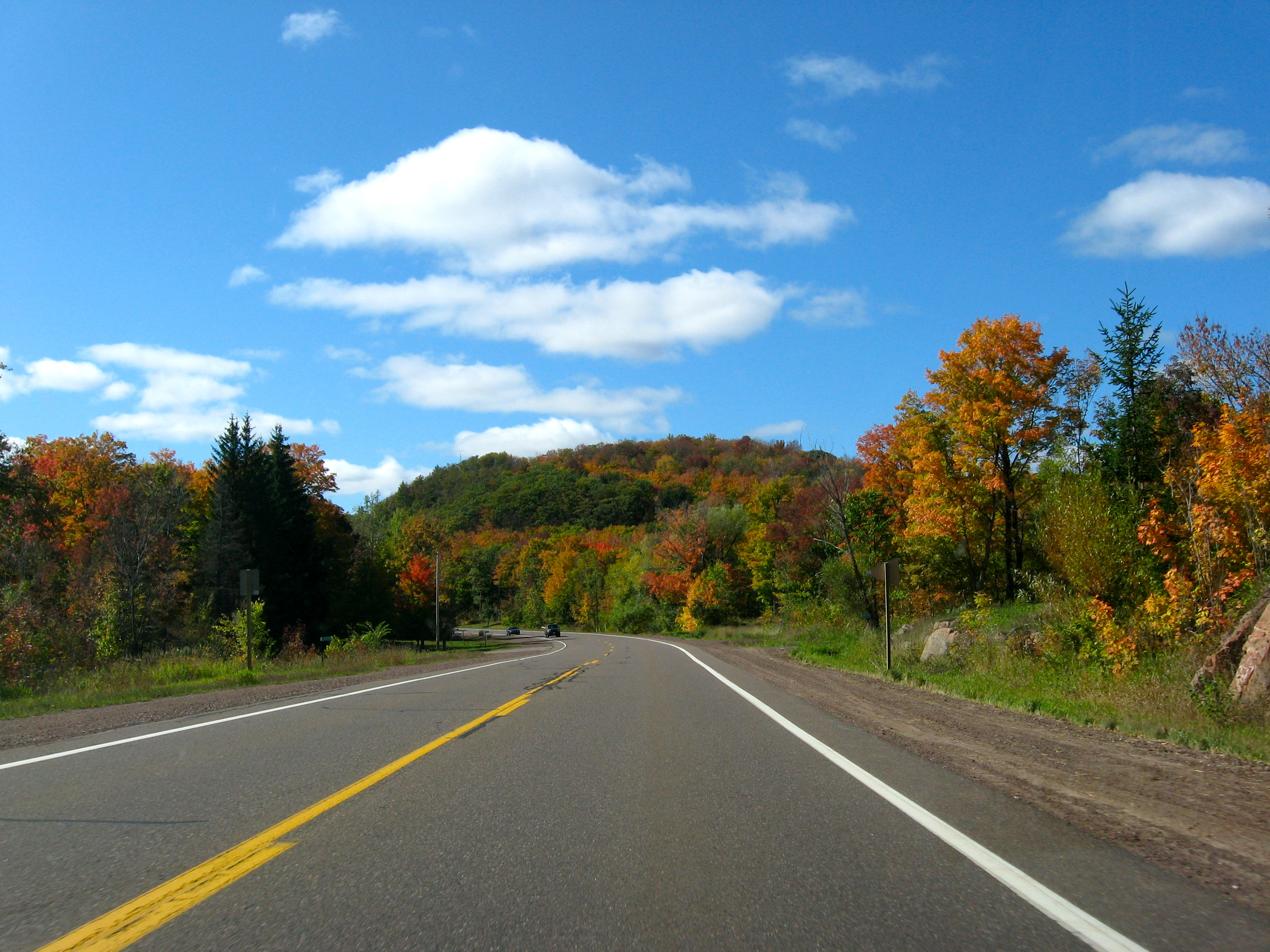
M-28/M-64 concurrency near Lake Gogebic in autumn

M-64 is maintained by the Michigan Department of Transportation (MDOT) like all other state trunkline highways. As a part of these responsibilities, the department tracks the volume of traffic that uses the highway. In 2009, MDOT's surveys showed that the volume along M-64 was 3,333 vehicles daily, on average on the Ontonagon River Bridge; the lowest traffic was between US 2 and the Gogebic–Ontonagon county line at 418 vehicles per day. The only segments of the trunkline that have been included on the National Highway System (NHS) are the US 2 and M-28 concurrencies. The NHS is a network of roads important to the country's defense, economy and mobility.

== History ==
=== Previous designations ===
By July 1, 1919, the first roads to carry the M-64 designation were signed in the southern Lower Peninsula. This highway ran from the Ohio state line north to Hillsdale, ending in rural southeastern Calhoun County. This trunkline was extended northerly in 1926 through Homer to end at the contemporary US 12 in Albion. In the latter half of 1929, this highway was redesignated M-9 (now M-99). At the same time, the original M-9 in Keweenaw County between US 41 and Eagle Harbor was renumbered M-64. The net effect was to swap the numbers between roads on opposing ends of the state. The next year, the M-64 number was swapped with another highway, the original M-129 that ran along the west side of Lake Gogebic and south to the Wisconsin state line.

=== Current highway ===
By 1927, a few roadways that are now part of M-64 were built and open to traffic. The road south of Marenisco was a county road at the time, and the highway between Silver City and Ontonagon was a part of the western segment of M-35. By the beginning of 1930, a highway called M-129 was designated south of US 2 to the Wisconsin state line and north along Lake Gogebic. By the end of the year, this road was renumbered as the southern section of M-64; the northern section of M-64 was the highway previously designated as the westernmost segment of M-35. The gap between the two sections was filled in by 1932.

Some curves in the roadway south of Marenisco were realigned, smoothing out the routing of the highway in late 1961. As this project was completed, the last segments of M-64 were fully paved, making the highway one of the last in the state to be fully hard-surfaced.

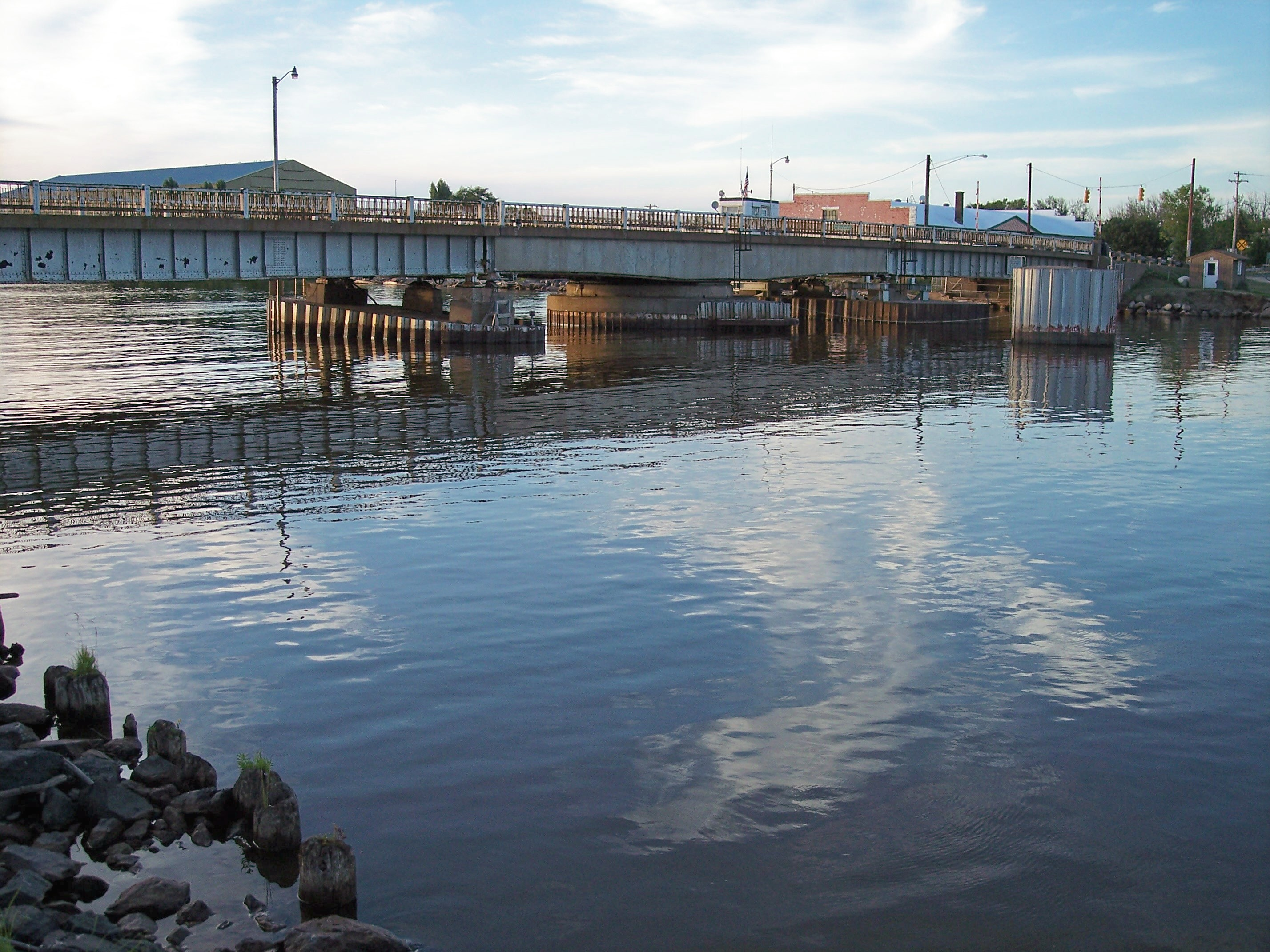
Former swing bridge in Ontonagon

The first bridge across the Ontonagon River was built in 1891. It was heavily damaged after a fire in the village a few years later. This bridge was deemed inadequate for the needs of traffic in Ontonagon in the 1930s. The Michigan State Highway Department (MSHD) contracted for a replacement span in 1939. A temporary crossing was used while the original span was demolished and replaced with a swing bridge. This style of bridge was popular with the department in the first half of the 20th century, but fell out of favor as the MSHD transitioned to bascule bridges. Because of this change, the Ontonagon River Bridge was the last of its type built in the state when it was completed in 1940.

MDOT determined in the early part of the 21st century that the swing bridge had "operational problems". Construction in 2006 replaced the span with a new structure and realigned both M-64 and M-38 in the village. That October, the new bridge was opened upstream of the former crossing. As a result, the northern terminus of M-64 is now at a junction with US 45 and M-38.

== Major intersections ==
| County | Location | mi | km | Destinations | Notes |
|---|---|---|---|---|---|
| Gogebic | Marenisco Township | 0.000 | 0.000 | CTH-B south | Wisconsin state line crossing near Presque Isle, WI |
| Gogebic | Marenisco | 9.596 | 15.443 | US 2 west – Ironwood | Western end of US 2 concurrency |
| Gogebic | Marenisco Township | 11.677 | 18.792 | US 2 east – Iron River | Eastern end of US 2 concurrency; M-64 turns north along the west shore of Lake Gogebic |
| Ontonagon | Merriweather | 29.482 | 47.447 | M-28 west / LSCT west – Wakefield | Western end of M-28 and LSCT concurrencies |
| Ontonagon | Bergland | 33.623 | 54.111 | M-28 east – Marquette | Eastern end of M-28 concurrency |
| Ontonagon | Silver City | 51.168 | 82.347 | 107th Engineers Memorial Highway west | Former M-107 provides access to Porcupine Mountains State Park and Lake of the Clouds |
| Ontonagon | Ontonagon | 63.765 | 102.620 | US 45 – Rockland M-38 east / LSCT east – Baraga | Northern terminus; roadway continues eastward as M-38 carrying the LSCT |
1.000 mi = 1.609 km; 1.000 km = 0.621 mi: Concurrency terminus
