= Maple Leaf Creek =

Location
- Country: United States
- State: Michigan
- Region: Upper Peninsula
- District: Ontonagon County

Physical characteristics
- Source
  - coordinates: 46.559444°N 89.323333°W
- Mouth
  - coordinates: 46.554111°N 89.2832°W

Maple Leaf Creek is located in McMillan Township of Michigan's Ontonagon County in the Upper Peninsula. The creek has its origin in Section 17 of the township, and winds its way through Sections 16 and 15, flowing into the South Branch Ontonagon River, about 1 1/3 miles north of the community of Ewen.
