= U.S. Route 45 in Michigan =

US Highway in Michigan

US Highway 45
- US 45 highlighted in red

Route information
- Maintained by MDOT
- Length: 54.759 mi (88.126 km)
- Existed: c. 1935–present

Major junctions
- South end: US 45 / WIS 32 near Land O' Lakes, Wisconsin
- US 2 in Watersmeet; M-28 in Bruce Crossing
- North end: Ontonagon & River streets in Ontonagon

Location
- Country: United States
- State: Michigan
- Counties: Gogebic, Ontonagon

Highway system
- United States Numbered Highway System; List; Special; Divided; Michigan State Trunkline Highway System; Interstate; US; State; Byways
← M-44	→ M-45

US Highway 45 (US 45) is a part of the United States Numbered Highway System that runs from Mobile, Alabama, to the Upper Peninsula (UP) of the state of Michigan. The highway forms a part of the state trunkline highway system that is maintained by the Michigan Department of Transportation (MDOT). It enters the state from Wisconsin south of Watersmeet, ending at an intersection with Ontonagon Street in Ontonagon. In between, the roadway crosses the UP running for approximately 54 3/4 miles (88.1 km) through the Ottawa National Forest and parallel to the Ontonagon River.

The highway dates back to the 1930s in Michigan. At the time it was extended into the state, it replaced sections of M-26 and M-35. An eight-mile (13 km) segment was significantly reconstructed in the late 1950s, and an alignment change in the 1970s moved the routing of US 45 near Rockland before it was reversed soon afterwards. A segment of roadway that formerly carried US 45 is the site of the Paulding Light, a local phenomenon whose origins were scientifically described in 2010.

== Route description ==
US 45 crosses from Wisconsin to Michigan near Land O' Lakes, Wisconsin, east of the Sylvania Wilderness area of the Ottawa National Forest. The highway angles northeast from the state line before curving around to the north toward Watersmeet, where it intersects US 2. Watersmeet is home to the northern section of the Lac Vieux Desert Indian Reservation. Continuing north across the Gogebic–Ontonagon county line, US 45 crosses the boundary between the Central and Eastern time zones.

In southern Ontonagon County, the highway runs west of the Bond Falls Flowage near Paulding. North of here, the trunkline enters Bruce Crossing and intersects M-28. After leaving town, US 45 runs northward parallel to the Middle Branch of the Ontonagon River, and the highway crosses the river near a roadside park south of Rockland. East of Rockland, US 45 meets the southern terminus of M-26; after the intersection, US 45 turns northwesterly and runs parallel to the Ontonagon River and a snowmobile trail (a former branch of the Escanaba and Lake Superior Railroad).

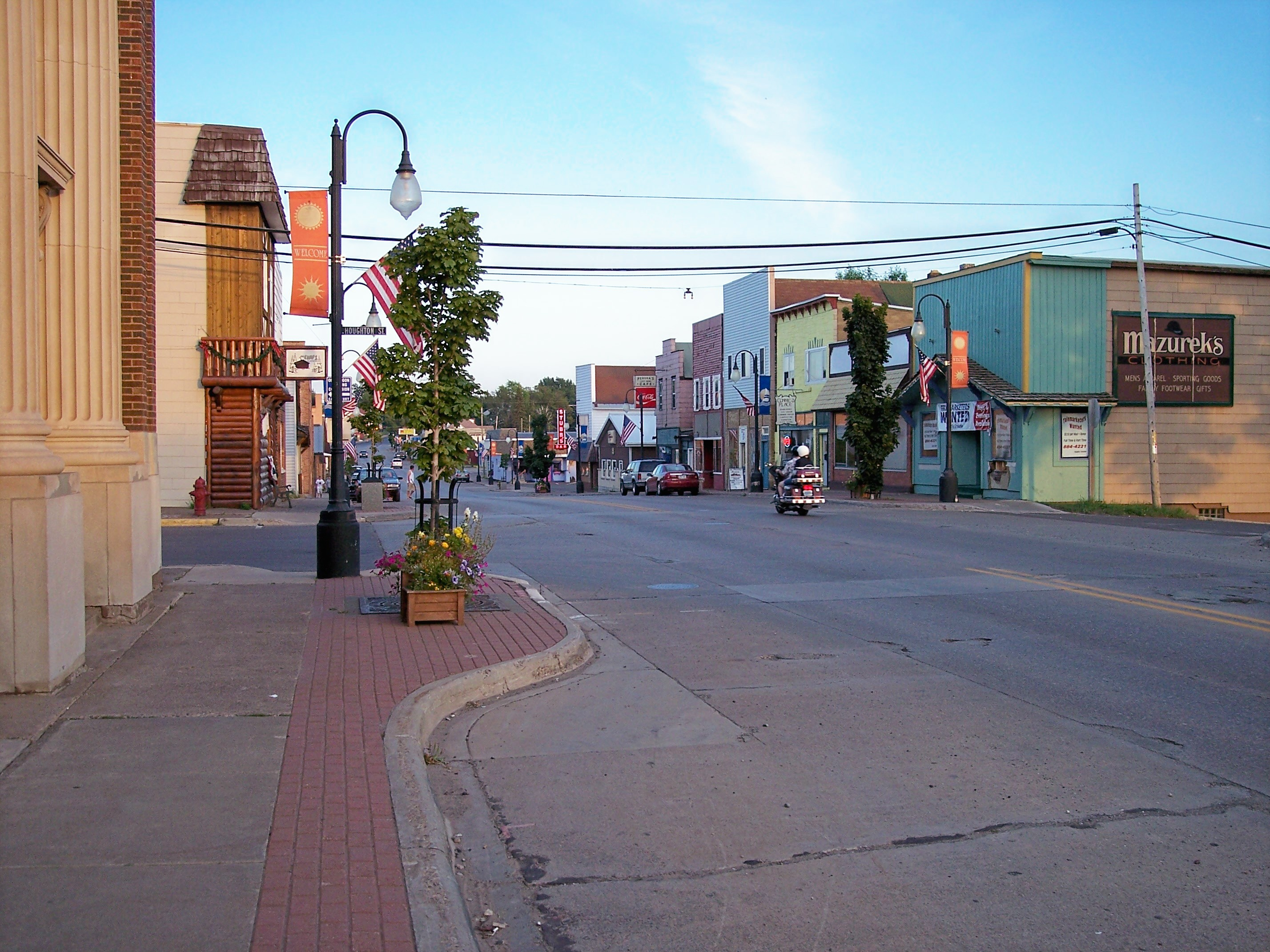
River Street, downtown Ontonagon

US 45 enters the south side of Ontonagon on Rockland Road near the Holy Family Cemetery. The roadway turns due north, still running parallel to the course of the river. South of downtown, the highway crosses an intersection that serves as the joint termini of M-38 and M-64. M-64 crosses the river from the west on a bridge built in 2006 and ends at the intersection. M-38 comes into town from the east and also ends at the same intersection. US 45 continues north on Rockland Road and turns northwest on River Street along the eastern river bank through downtown. The northern terminus of US 45 is at Ontonagon Street, about 1,000 feet (300 m) from Lake Superior.

== History ==
US 45 debuted in Michigan by 1935 on maps of the time. The highway previously terminated in Des Plaines, Illinois, until it was extended northward to Michigan. US 45 replaced M-26 between the state line north toward Rockland, as well as M-35 between Rockland and Ontonagon. The Michigan State Highway Department (MSHD) rebuilt an eight-mile (13 km) section of the highway in the Military Hills area of eastern Ontonagon County starting in 1957. As part of the project, tons of waste copper rock were hauled into the area to provide a base for the reconstructed roadway, which was previously quite steep through the hills and muddy during rains. The project included a new bridge over the Ontonagon River that opened in late 1959. Along with this bridge, the last eight miles (13 km) of US 45 in the country were paved, connecting the Gulf of Mexico and Lake Superior with a hard-surfaced road.

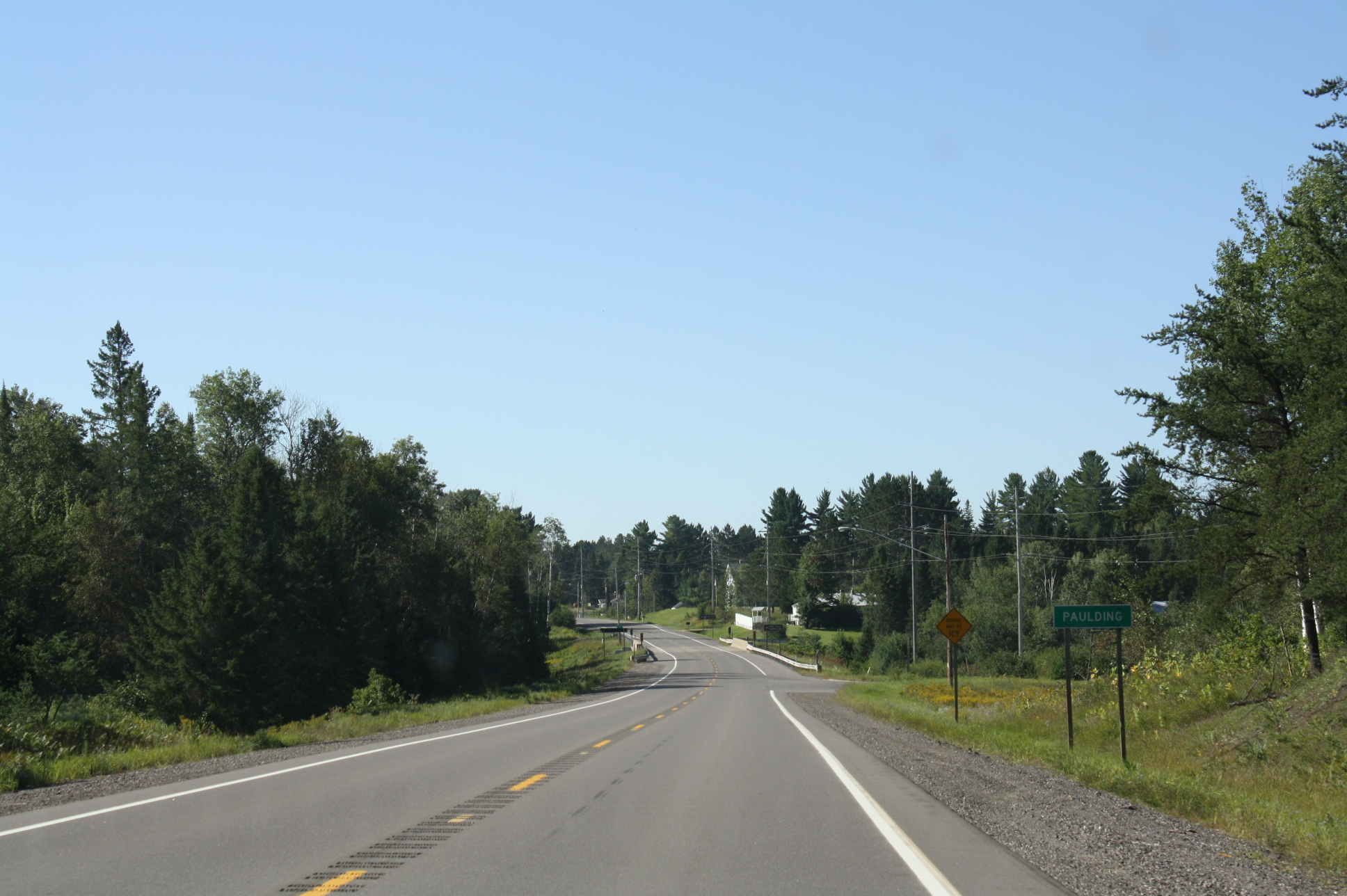
US 45 entering Paulding

A rerouting in late 1971 moved the US 45 designation along M-26 between Rockland and Greenland. From Greenland, US 45 followed Ontonagon–Greenland Road to Ontonagon. In late 1973, MDOT reversed the rerouting—US 45 was restored to its previous routing on Rockland Road between Rockland and Ontonagon and M-26 was re-extended south from Greenland to Rockland; M-38 was extended west along Ontonagon–Greenland Road.

In 2010, students from Michigan Technological University solved the mystery of the Paulding Light, a local phenomenon commonly attributed to paranormal activity. The phenomenon is viewable from a section of Robbins Pond Road, the former routing of US 45 in the Paulding area. According to area folklore, and indicated on signs in the viewing area, the light is from the ghost of a railroad brakeman. Other explanations say the light comes from a ghost train from the 19th century. The students' investigation showed that the light comes from headlights of cars on US 45 in the Paulding area.

== Major intersections ==
County	Location	mi	km	Destinations	Notes
Gogebic	Watersmeet Township	0.000	0.000	US 45 south / WIS 32 south – Eagle River	Wisconsin state line
Gogebic	Watersmeet	7.522	12.105	US 2 – Ironwood, Iron Mountain	
Ontonagon	Bruce Crossing	26.668	42.918	M-28 – Wakefield, Marquette	
Ontonagon	Rockland Township	40.524	65.217	M-26 north – Houghton	Southern terminus of M-26
Ontonagon	Ontonagon	54.094	87.056	M-38 east / LSCT east – Baraga M-64 west / LSCT west – Silver City	Western terminus of M-38; northern terminus of M-64
Ontonagon	Ontonagon	54.759	88.126	Ontonagon Street	Northern terminus of US 45
1.000 mi = 1.609 km; 1.000 km = 0.621 mi

== See also ==
U.S. Route 45
Previous state: Wisconsin	Michigan	Next state: Terminus
