= Craigsmere, Michigan =

- Unincorporated community
- Location within the state of Michigan
- Coordinates: 46°25′17″N 89°14′28″W
- Country: United States
- State: Michigan
- County: Ontonagon
- Township: McMillan
- Elevation: 1,237 ft (377 m)
- Time zone: UTC-5 (Eastern (EST))
  - Summer (DST): UTC-4 (EDT)
- ZIP code(s): 49925 (Ewen)
- Area code: 906
- GNIS feature ID: 1619602

Craigsmere is an unincorporated community in Ontonagon County in the U.S. state of Michigan. The community is located within McMillan Township.

== History ==
Craigsmere was founded in the 1880s by the Craig Lumber Company as a company town.
