= Matchwood Township, Michigan =

- Civil township
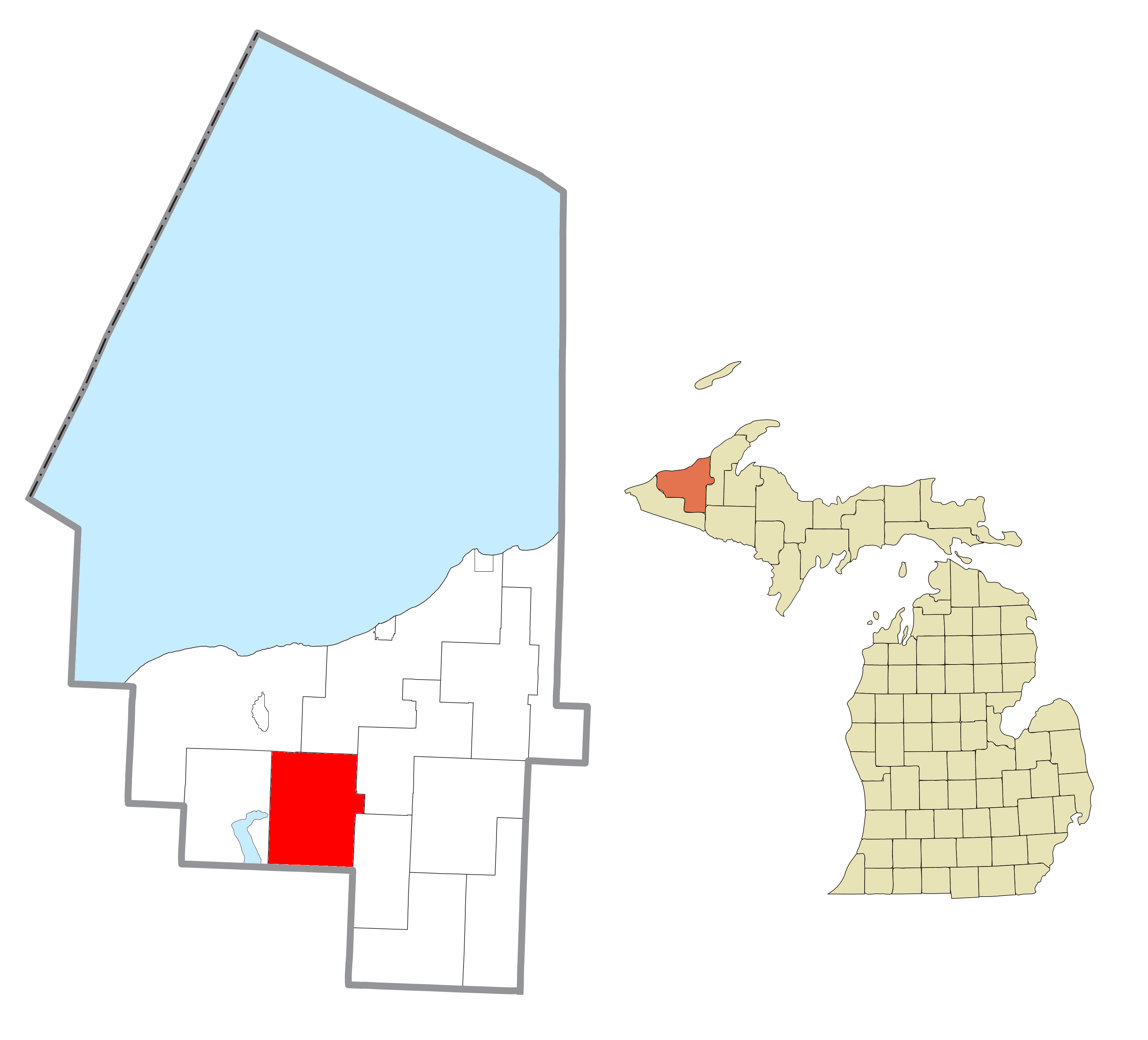
- Location within Ontonagon County

- Location within the state of Michigan Matchwood Township (the United States)
- Coordinates: 46°36′05″N 89°27′15″W
- Country: United States
- State: Michigan
- County: Ontonagon

Government
  - Supervisor: Glen Longtin
  - Clerk: Lorraine Warsop

Area
  - Total: 109.53 sq mi (283.7 km^{2})
  - Land: 109.52 sq mi (283.7 km^{2})
  - Water: 0.01 sq mi (0.026 km^{2})
- Elevation: 1,257 ft (383 m)

Population (2020)
  - Total: 90
  - Density: 0.86/sq mi (0.33/km^{2})
- Time zone: UTC-5 (Eastern (EST))
  - Summer (DST): UTC-4 (EDT)
- ZIP code(s): 49910 (Bergland); 49925 (Ewen); 49953 (Painesdale)
- Area code: 906
- FIPS code: 26-52320
- GNIS feature ID: 1626709

Matchwood Township is a civil township of Ontonagon County in the U.S. state of Michigan. The population was 90 at the 2020 census.

== Geography ==
According to the United States Census Bureau, the township has a total area of 109.53 square miles (283.68 km^{2}), of which 109.52 square miles (283.66 km^{2}) is land and 0.01 square miles (0.03 km^{2}) (0.01%) is water.

=== Communities ===
- Matchwood is an unincorporated community at 46°33′23″N 89°23′47″W on M-28 about six miles west of Ewen and nine miles east of Bergland. It was named for the Diamond Match Company, which owned most of the pine forest in the area. The company founded the settlement in 1888 to provide for logging camps. It received a Post Office in 1889 and was nearly destroyed by a forest fire in 1893. The community was rebuilt, only to be ruined by another fire in 1906. The Duluth, South Shore and Atlantic Railway (now the Soo Line Railroad) passed through the settlement.
