= Ontonagon Harbor Piers Historic District =

Historic district in Michigan, United States

- U.S. National Register of Historic Places
- U.S. Historic district
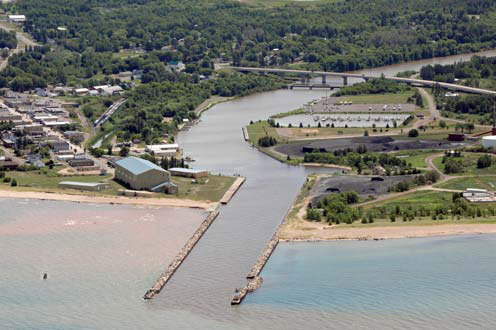

- Location within Michigan Location within the United States
- Interactive map
- Location: Ontonagon R. at Lake Superior, Ontonagon, Michigan
- Coordinates: 46°52′36″N 89°18′39″W
- Area: 16 acres (6.5 ha)
- Built: 1868
- Architect: US Army Corps of Engineers
- NRHP reference No.: 01001313
- Added to NRHP: December 4, 2001

The Ontonagon Harbor Piers Historic District is historic shipping structure located on the Ontonagon River at Lake Superior in Ontonagon, Michigan. It was listed on the National Register of Historic Places in 2001.

== History ==
In 1860, the Army Corps of Engineers began designing pier structures in Ontonagon at the mouth of the river. The initial construction of the Ontonagon piers was carried out during 1868-1872 The inner 1069 feet of the west pier, constructed of wood pilings filled with stone, dates from this time. Over the next 20 years, another 1770 feet of the east pier and 1398 feet of the west pier was constructed, and a pierhead light was installed on the west pier. In addition, the inner 545 ft of the east pier was reconstructed; all of these pier structures were of rock-filler timber cribs.

In the 1920 and 1930s, a stone superstructure was built over sections of both piers, and a concrete cap was constructed on the inner 1,069 feet of the west pier. In 1947, the west pierhead was rebuilt, and in 1883 various structural improvements were made.

== Description ==
The shipping channel between the piers is 150 feet wide and 15–17 feet deep. The east and west entrance piers are 2,315 feet and 2,563 feet long, respectively. A flared approach channel extends 850 feet to deep water. The inner basin is 900 feet long and 12 feet deep. The Ontonagon harbor is the only refuge for small craft between the Keweenaw Waterway upper entrance and Black River Harbor.

== Gallery ==
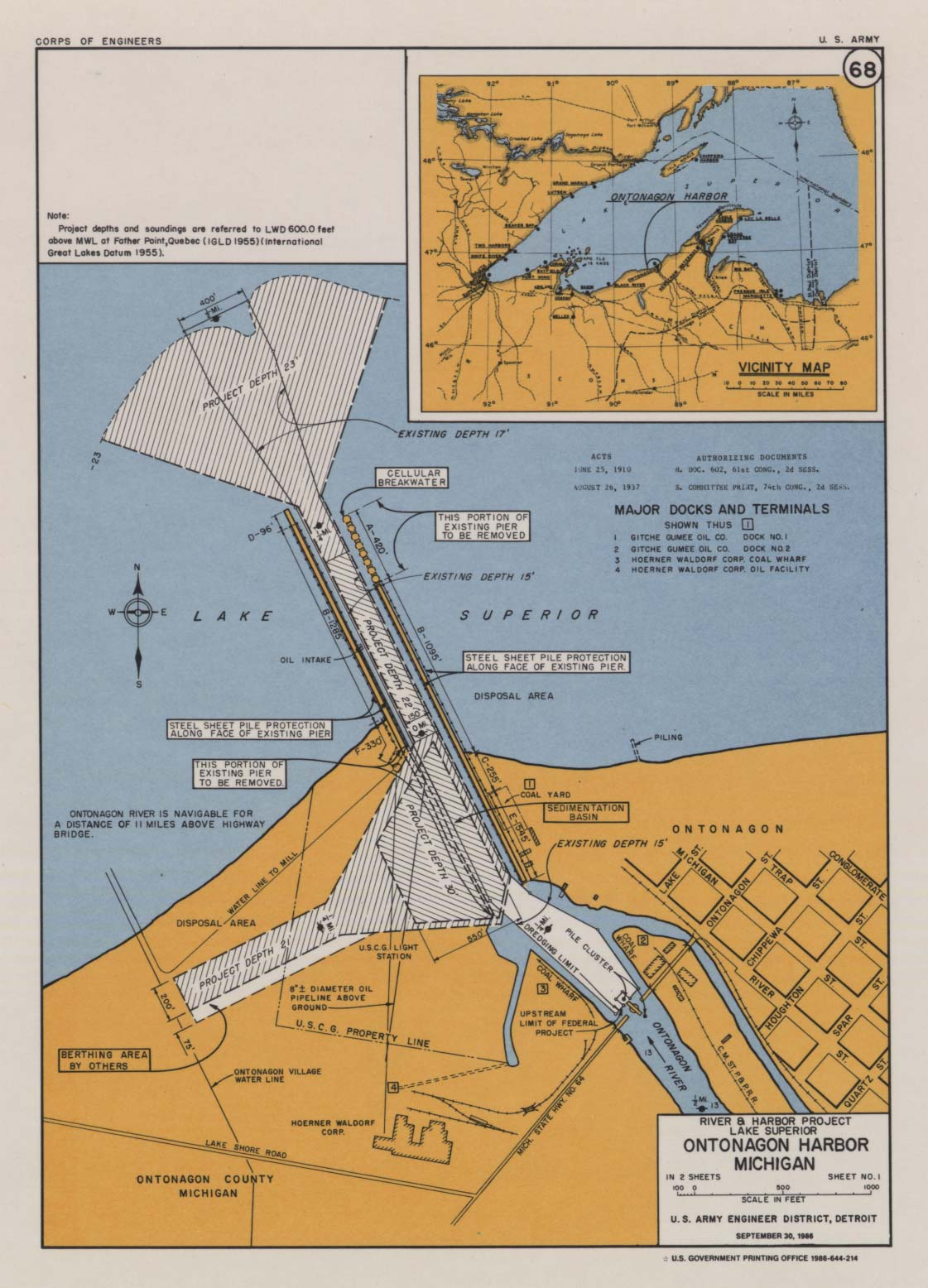
Diagram of piers

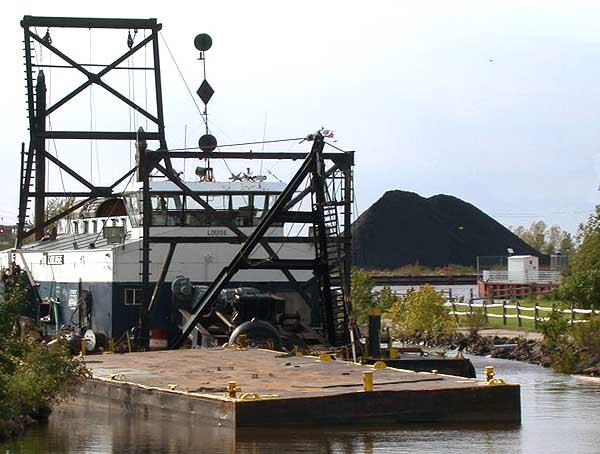
Ship navigating through harbor

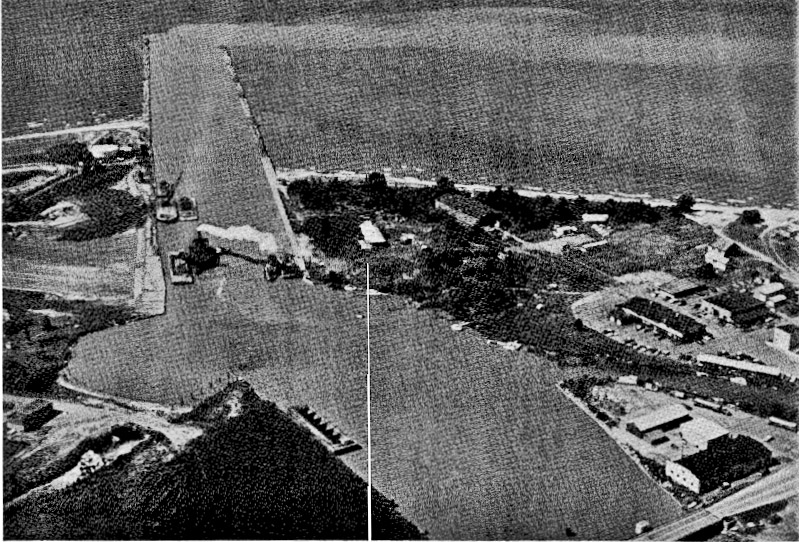
Aerial view

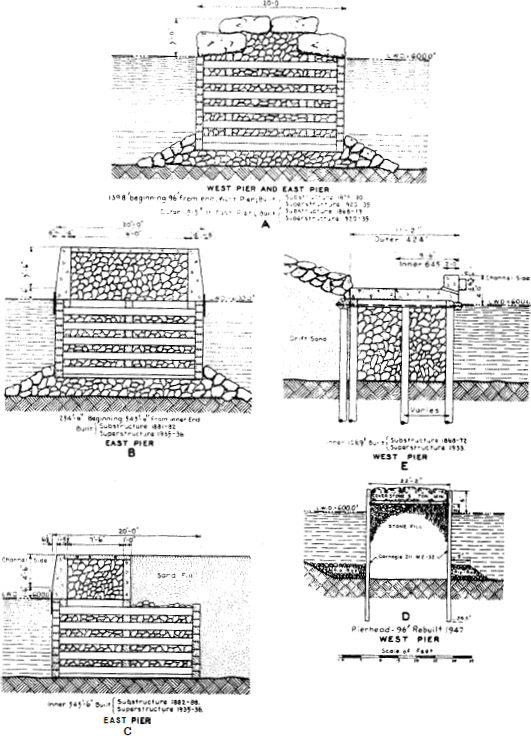
Cross-sections of various elements
