= Bergland Township, Michigan =

- Civil township
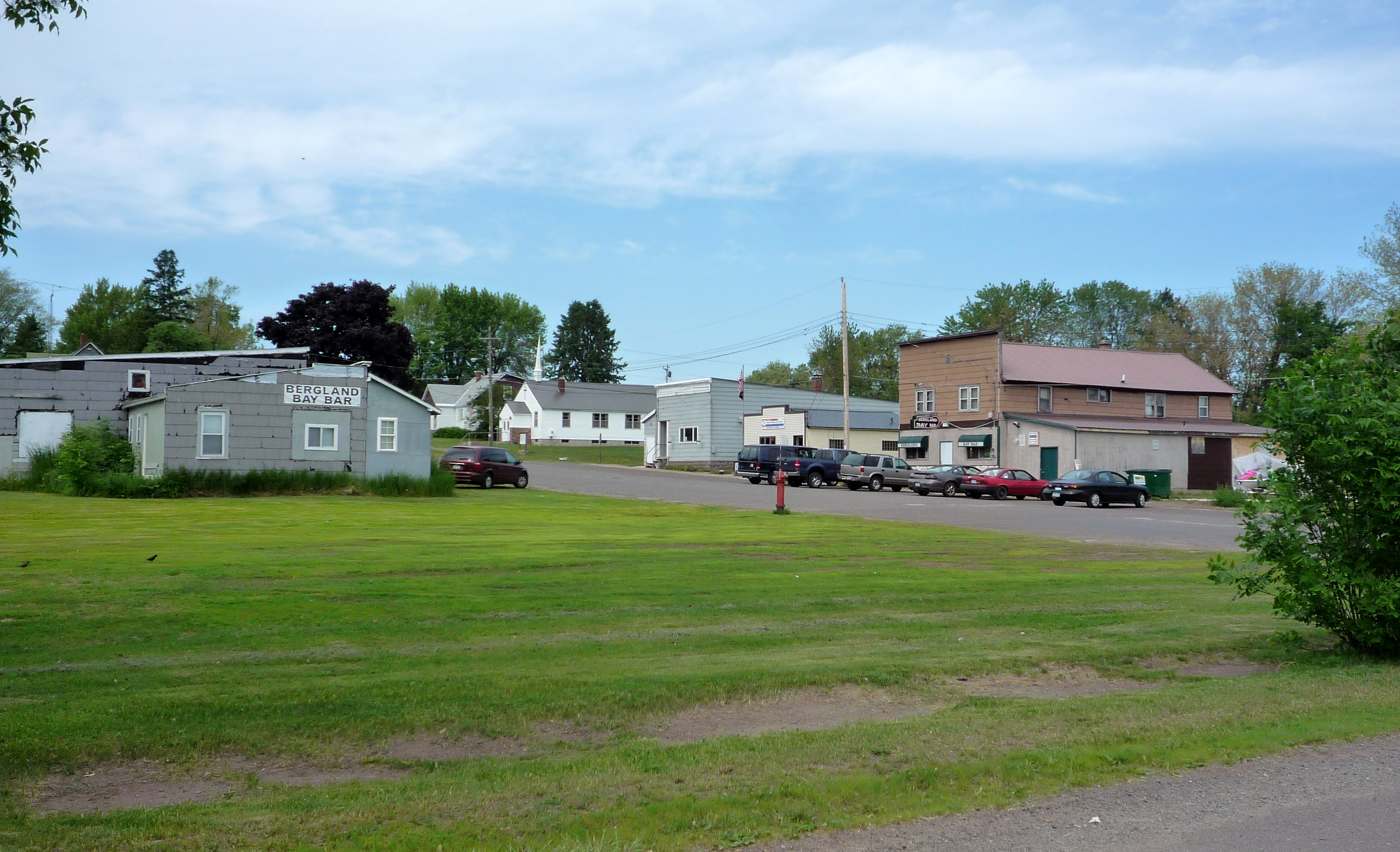
- Unincorporated community of Bergland

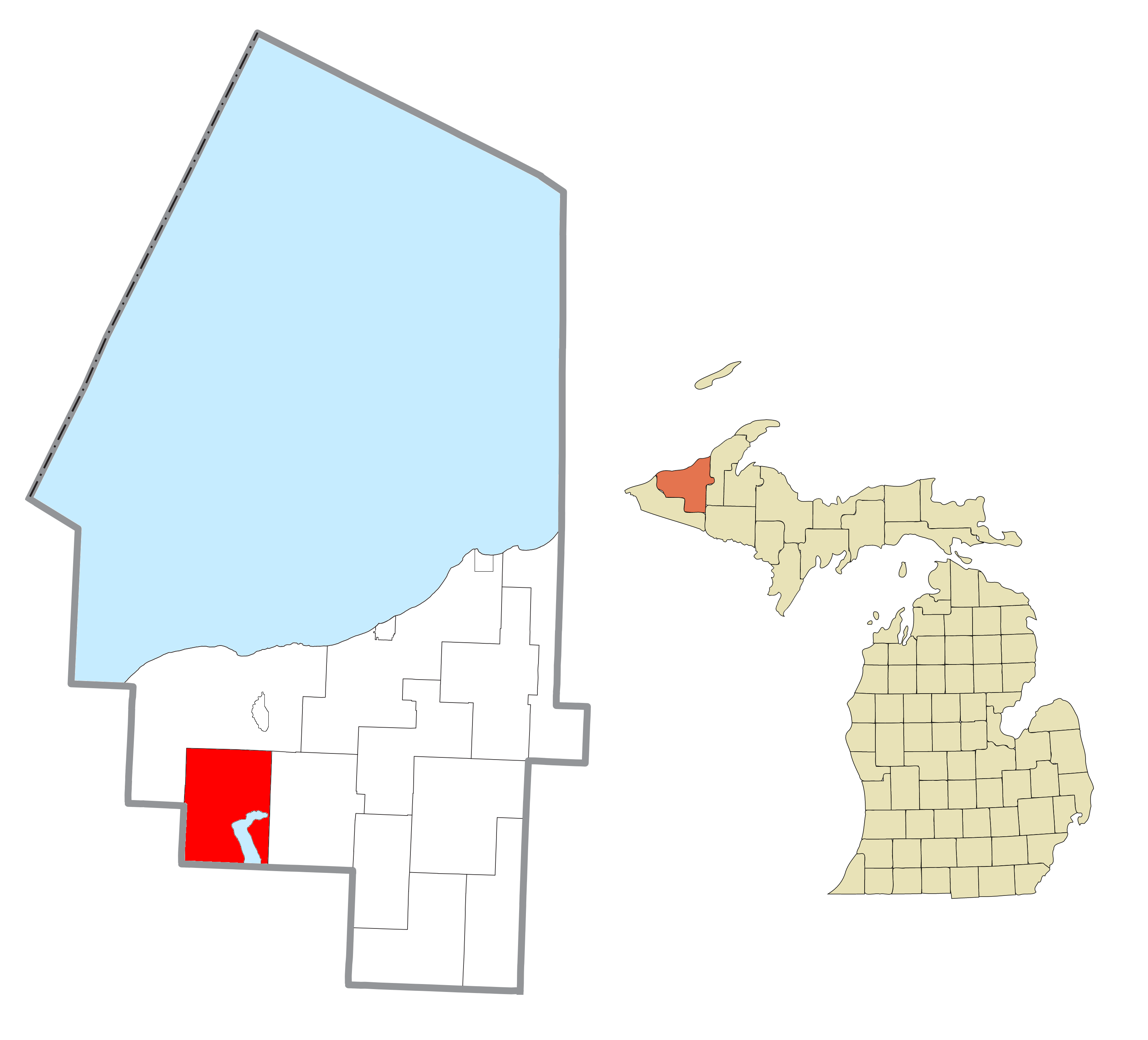
- Location within Ontonagon County

- Location within the state of Michigan Bergland Township (the United States)
- Coordinates: 46°34′35″N 89°36′33″W
- Country: United States
- State: Michigan
- County: Ontonagon

Government
  - Supervisor: Jack Otlewis
  - Clerk: Lori Schmidt

Area
  - Total: 108.24 sq mi (280.3 km^{2})
  - Land: 98.50 sq mi (255.1 km^{2})
  - Water: 9.74 sq mi (25.2 km^{2})
- Elevation: 1,329 ft (405 m)

Population (2020)
  - Total: 438
  - Density: 4.7/sq mi (1.8/km^{2})
- Time zone: UTC-5 (Eastern (EST))
  - Summer (DST): UTC-4 (EDT)
- ZIP code(s): 49910 (Bergland)
- Area code: 906
- FIPS code: 26-07640
- GNIS feature ID: 1625921
- Website: Official website

Bergland Township is a civil township of Ontonagon County in the U.S. state of Michigan. As of the 2020 census, the township population was 438.

== Geography ==
According to the United States Census Bureau, the township has a total area of 108.24 square miles (280.3 km^{2}), of which 98.50 square miles (255.1 km^{2}) is land and 9.74 square miles (25.2 km^{2}) (9.00%) is water, most of which is Lake Gogebic.

The civil township comprises two full survey townships, T48N R43W and T49N R43W, and the western half of two others, T48N R42W and T49 R42W. Gogebic County is to the south and to the west of the southern tier of survey townships. Carp Lake Township is to the north and west of the northern tier. Matchwood Township is to the east.

=== Communities ===
- Bergland is an unincorporated community and census-designated place within the township, situated at the junction of M-28 and M-64 on the north end of Lake Gogebic in the Ottawa National Forest. Bergland is at 46°35′33″N 89°34′24″W. The ZIP Code is 49910.
- Lake Gogebic is a census-designated place just west of Bergland and includes the unincorporated communities of Lake Gogebic and Merriweather.

=== Climate ===
The climate is described as Humid Continental by the Köppen Climate System, abbreviated as Dfb.

Climate data for Bergland, Michigan (1991–2020 normals, extremes 1888–present)
Month	Jan	Feb	Mar	Apr	May	Jun	Jul	Aug	Sep	Oct	Nov	Dec	Year
Record high °F (°C)	53 (12)	60 (16)	80 (27)	89 (32)	93 (34)	98 (37)	100 (38)	99 (37)	98 (37)	89 (32)	73 (23)	59 (15)	100 (38)
Mean daily maximum °F (°C)	20.7 (−6.3)	25.0 (−3.9)	36.1 (2.3)	49.2 (9.6)	64.3 (17.9)	73.7 (23.2)	77.5 (25.3)	75.9 (24.4)	67.9 (19.9)	53.7 (12.1)	38.1 (3.4)	26.0 (−3.3)	50.7 (10.4)
Daily mean °F (°C)	12.0 (−11.1)	13.6 (−10.2)	23.3 (−4.8)	37.1 (2.8)	51.1 (10.6)	61.1 (16.2)	65.2 (18.4)	63.6 (17.6)	56.2 (13.4)	43.5 (6.4)	30.6 (−0.8)	18.3 (−7.6)	39.6 (4.2)
Mean daily minimum °F (°C)	3.2 (−16.0)	2.3 (−16.5)	10.5 (−11.9)	25.0 (−3.9)	37.8 (3.2)	48.4 (9.1)	53.0 (11.7)	51.2 (10.7)	44.4 (6.9)	33.3 (0.7)	23.0 (−5.0)	10.6 (−11.9)	28.6 (−1.9)
Record low °F (°C)	−45 (−43)	−48 (−44)	−40 (−40)	−11 (−24)	12 (−11)	27 (−3)	31 (−1)	30 (−1)	21 (−6)	11 (−12)	−15 (−26)	−30 (−34)	−48 (−44)
Average precipitation inches (mm)	3.42 (87)	2.48 (63)	2.68 (68)	3.46 (88)	3.67 (93)	3.74 (95)	3.95 (100)	3.56 (90)	3.75 (95)	4.42 (112)	3.68 (93)	3.80 (97)	42.61 (1,082)
Average snowfall inches (cm)	41.6 (106)	27.7 (70)	22.4 (57)	13.8 (35)	1.6 (4.1)	0.0 (0.0)	0.0 (0.0)	0.0 (0.0)	0.2 (0.51)	5.0 (13)	28.2 (72)	39.5 (100)	180.0 (457)
Average precipitation days (≥ 0.01 in)	21.7	15.7	14.2	13.8	13.3	12.6	11.4	10.4	13.0	16.1	16.9	20.3	179.4
Average snowy days (≥ 0.1 in)	20.0	14.7	10.5	5.3	0.5	0.0	0.0	0.0	0.1	2.7	10.7	18.2	82.7
Source: NOAA
