= Matchwood =

Matchwood may refer to:

- Matchwood Township, Michigan, U.S.
- Wood which has splintered small under impact
- Wood used to make matches
