= McMillan Township, Michigan =

McMillan Township is the name of some places in the U.S. state of Michigan:

- McMillan Township, Luce County, Michigan
- McMillan Township, Ontonagon County, Michigan

== See also ==
- McMillan, Michigan, an unincorporated community
