= Ontonagon County, Michigan =

County in Michigan, United States

- County
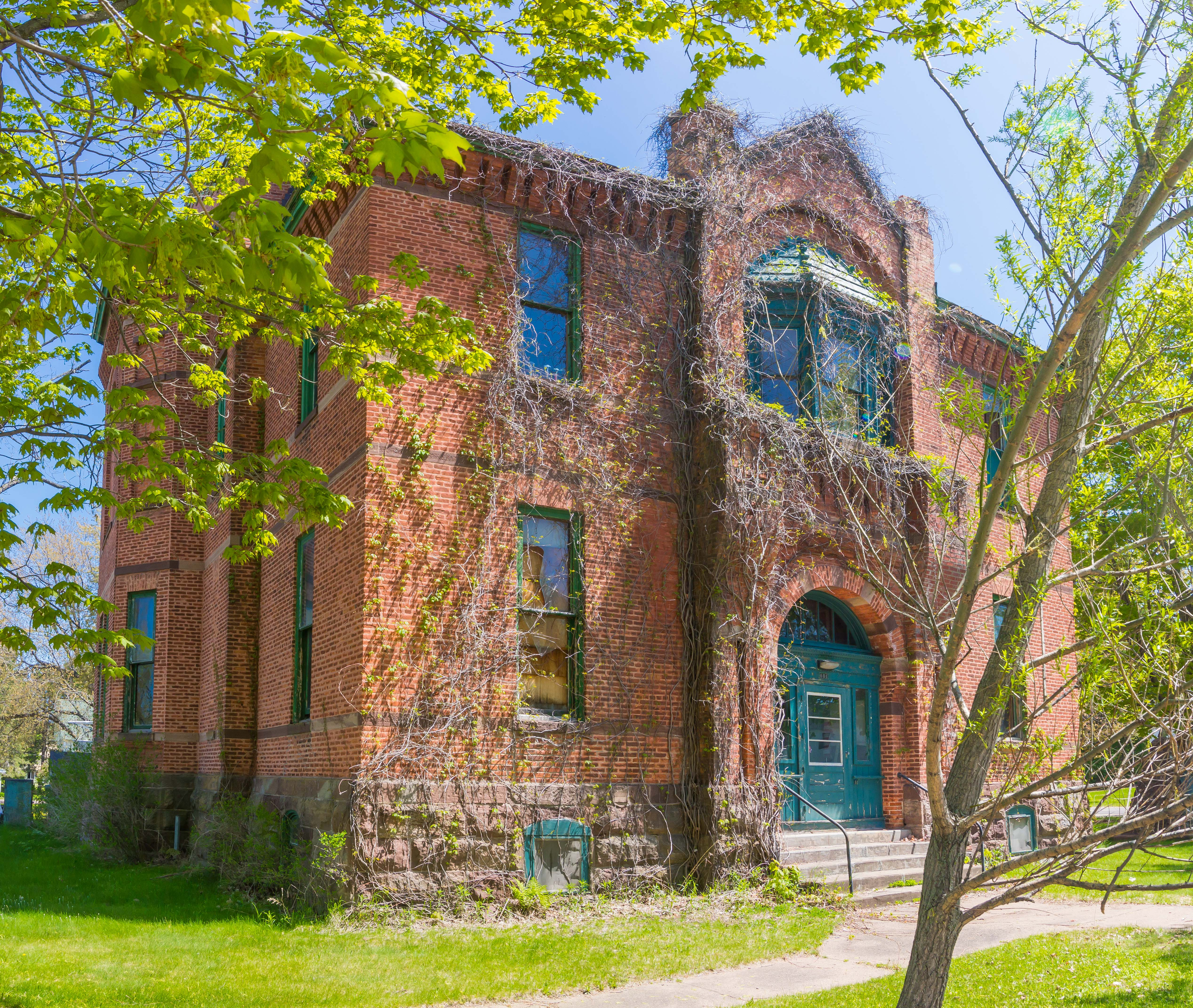
- Old Ontonagon County Courthouse in Ontonagon

- Location within the U.S. state of Michigan
- Coordinates: 46°59′N 89°16′W
- Country: United States
- State: Michigan
- Founded: March 9, 1843; 1848 organized
- Named for: Ontonagon River
- Seat: Ontonagon
- Largest village: Ontonagon

Area
  - Total: 3,741 sq mi (9,690 km^{2})
  - Land: 1,311 sq mi (3,400 km^{2})
  - Water: 2,430 sq mi (6,300 km^{2}) 65%

Population (2020)
  - Total: 5,816
  - Estimate (2025): 5,823 ▲
  - Density: 5.2/sq mi (2.0/km^{2})
- Time zone: UTC−5 (Eastern)
  - Summer (DST): UTC−4 (EDT)
- Congressional district: 1st
- Website: http://ontonagoncounty.org/

Ontonagon County (/ˌɒntəˈnɑːɡən/ ON-tə-NAH-gən) is a county in the Upper Peninsula of the U.S. state of Michigan. As of the 2020 census, the population was 5,816, making it Michigan's third-least populous county. The county seat is Ontonagon. The county was set off in 1843, and organized in 1848. Its territory had been organized as part of Chippewa and Mackinac counties. With increasing population in the area, more counties were organized. After Ontonagon was organized, it was split to create Gogebic County. It is also the westernmost county in the United States that lies within the Eastern Time Zone.

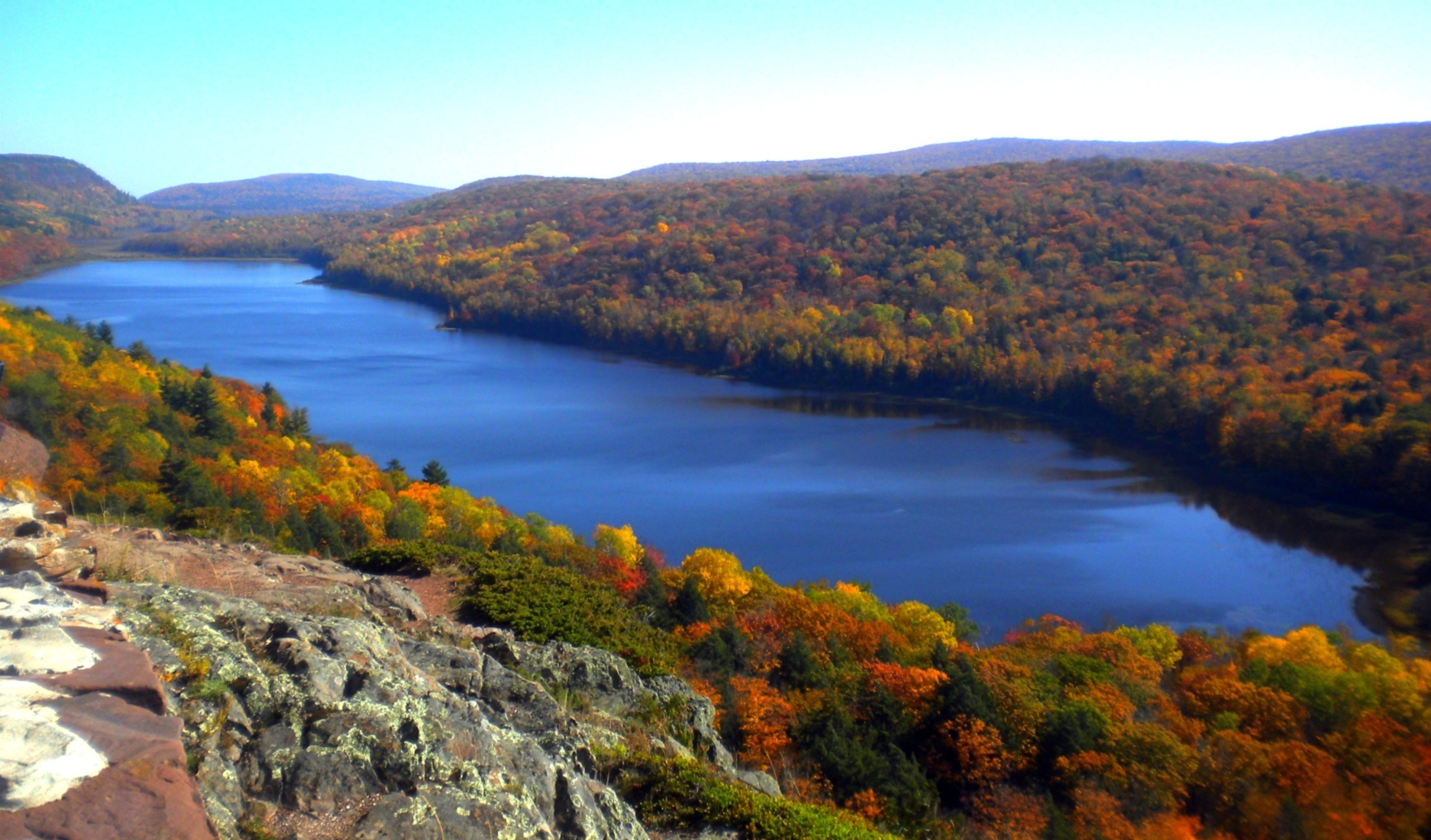
Lake of the Clouds in Porcupine Mountains Wilderness State Park

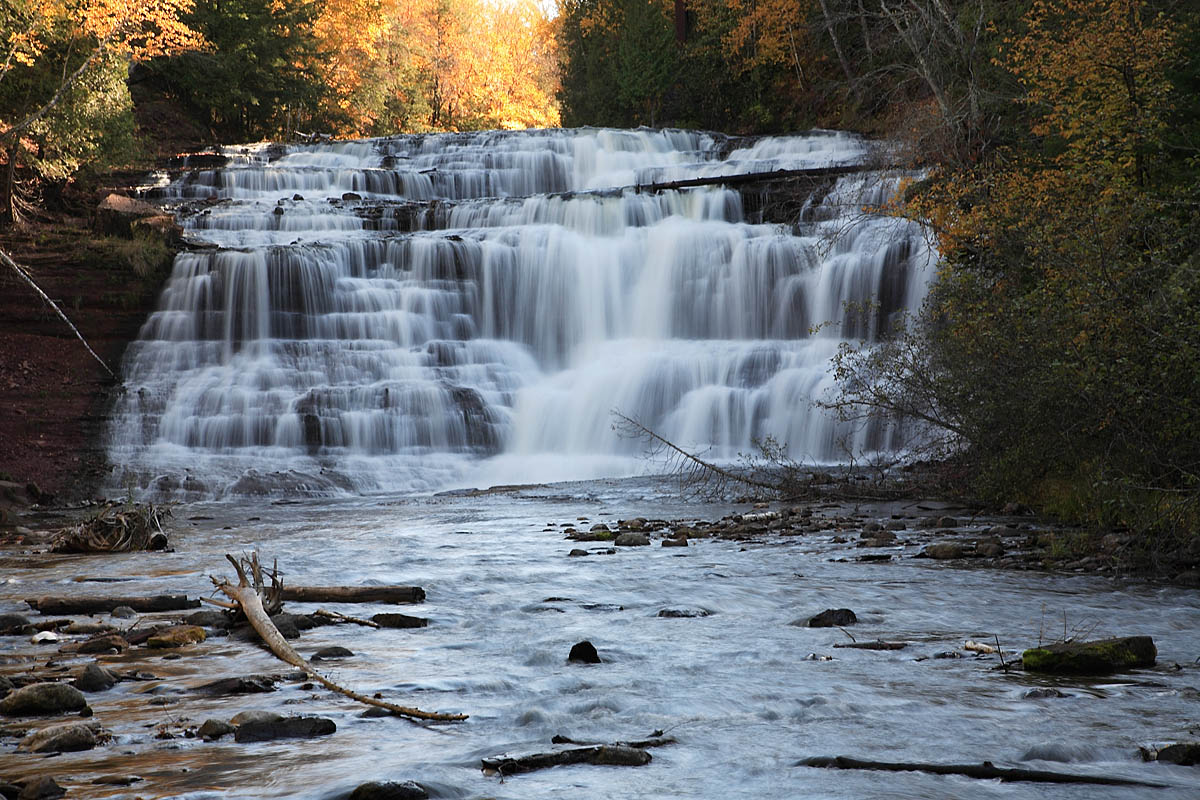
Agate Falls

== History ==
In 1843, Michigan's Upper Peninsula was divided into Mackinac, Chippewa, Marquette, Schoolcraft, Delta, and Ontonagon Counties. In 1845, a portion of Ontonagon County was partitioned to be part of Houghton County. In 1846, the village of Ontonagon was named as the county seat of Ontonagon County.

Ontonagon County is part of Copper Country, a region of the Upper Peninsula with prevalent copper mining from 1845 until the late 1960s. Prehistoric mining was conducted by local Native American populations. The first attempts by Europeans to mine copper in the area came in 1771 in the Ontonagon River. The Ontonagan Copper Boulder was removed from the west branch of the Ontonagon River and transported in 1842 to Detroit where it was weighed at 3708 pounds, thence to the Smithsonian Institution. The last copper mine in Copper Country was the White Pine mine, which closed in 1995.

=== Etymology ===
The county is named after the Ontonagon River. The name is said to be loosely derived from an Ojibwe language word noojitoon ziibi, meaning "hunting river." A French transliteration, Nantounagon, identified the river on a 1670 French map. Alternatively, and perhaps more accurately, it is said to be derived from the Ojibwa onagon, which means "dish" or "bowl." See List of Michigan county name etymologies.

== Geography ==
According to the US Census Bureau, the county has a total area of 3,741 square miles (9,690 km^{2}), of which 1,311 square miles (3,400 km^{2}) is land and 2,430 square miles (6,300 km^{2}) (65%) is water. It is the third-largest county in Michigan by area.

Ontonagon County is located in the western Upper Peninsula, along the shore of Lake Superior. At a longitude of 89.5°W, it is the westernmost county in the United States contained entirely within the Eastern Time Zone.

=== Geographic features ===
- Porcupine Mountains
- Lake of the Clouds
- Lake Superior
- Lake Gogebic is the largest lake in the Upper Peninsula.
- Corpse Pond
- Ontonagon River
- Firesteel River
- Flintsteel River
- Halfway Creek
- Townline Creek
- Maple Leaf Creek

=== Adjacent counties ===
By land

- Houghton County (east)
- Iron County (southeast; CST border)
- Gogebic County (south, southwest; CST border)

By water

- Ashland County, Wisconsin (west; CST border)
- Cook County, Minnesota (northwest; CST border)
- Keweenaw County (northeast)

=== National protected areas ===
- Keweenaw National Historical Park (part)
- Ottawa National Forest (part)

== Transportation ==
=== Major highways ===
- US 45 – runs north–south through east-central part of county. Enters south line from Watersmeet, passes Paulding, Bruce Crossing, and Rockland, ending at Ontonagon.
- M-26 – enters east line of county at 12 miles (19 km) south of NE county corner. Runs SW, passing Mass City and Lake Mine, to intersection with M-38 east of Rockland.
- M-28 – runs east–west thru southern part of county. Enters 10.4 miles (16.7 km) north of SE county corner. Runs westerly into Gogebic County.
- M-38 – enters east line of county at a point east of Mass City. Runs west to Lake Mine, then WNW to terminus at Ontonagon.
- M-64 – runs north–south through center part of county. Enters south line on west side of Lake Gogebic; runs north to Lake Superior shoreline. Runs NE along shoreline to terminus at Ontonagon.

=== Airport ===
- Ontonagon County Airport (KOGM) serves the county and surrounding communities.

== Demographics ==
Historical population
Census	Pop.	Note	%±
1850	389		—
1860	4,568		1,074.3%
1870	2,845		−37.7%
1880	2,565		−9.8%
1890	3,756		46.4%
1900	6,197		65.0%
1910	8,650		39.6%
1920	12,428		43.7%
1930	11,114		−10.6%
1940	11,359		2.2%
1950	10,282		−9.5%
1960	10,584		2.9%
1970	10,548		−0.3%
1980	9,861		−6.5%
1990	8,854		−10.2%
2000	7,818		−11.7%
2010	6,780		−13.3%
2020	5,816		−14.2%
2025 (est.)	5,823	▲	0.1%
US Decennial Census; 1790-1960 1900-1990; 1990-2000 2010-2018

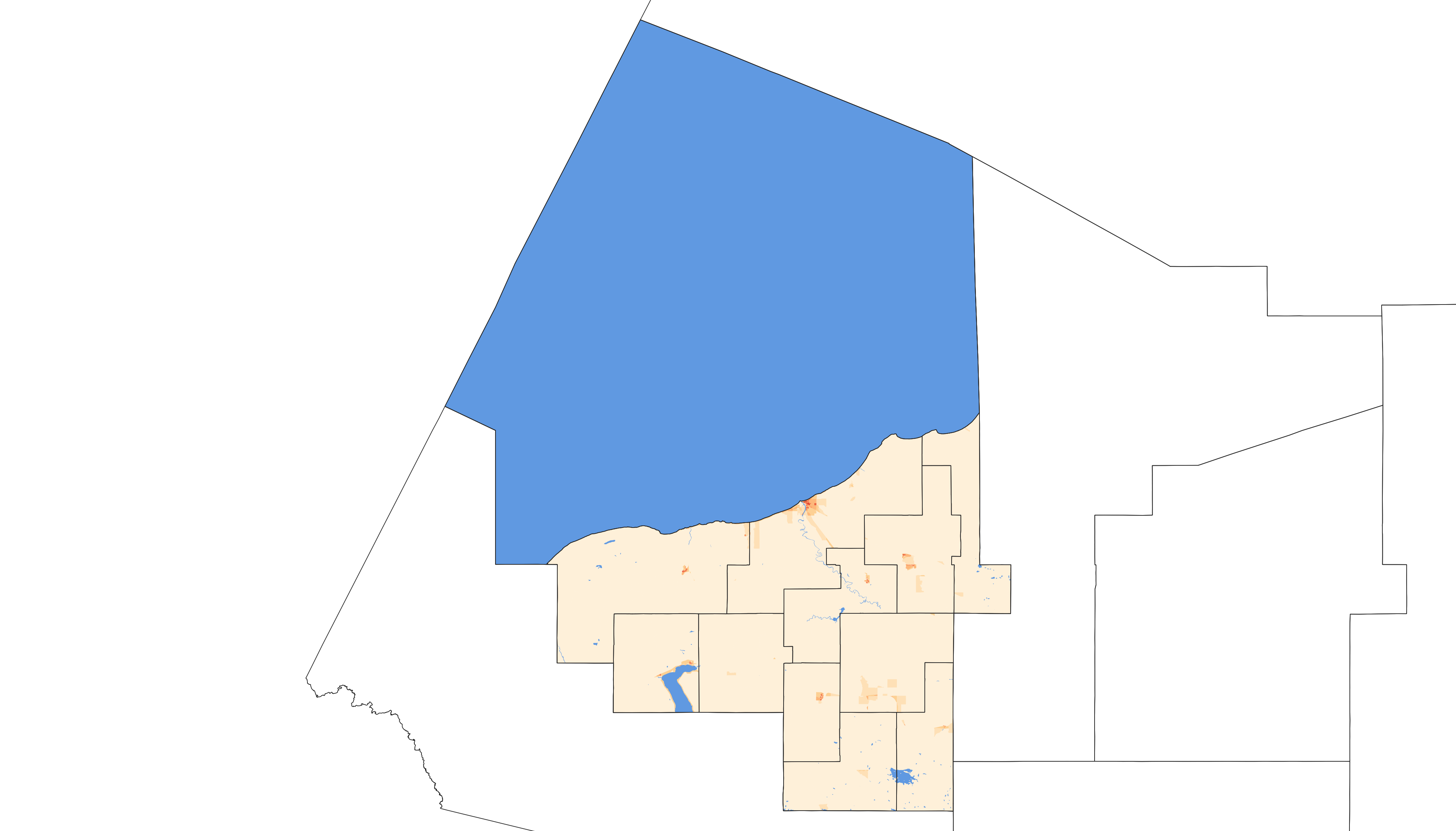
2020 population density of Ontonagon County MI by census block

=== Racial and ethnic composition ===
Ontonagon County, Michigan – Racial and ethnic composition Note: the US Census treats Hispanic/Latino as an ethnic category. This table excludes Latinos from the racial categories and assigns them to a separate category. Hispanics/Latinos may be of any race.
Race / Ethnicity (NH = Non-Hispanic)	Pop 1980	Pop 1990	Pop 2000	Pop 2010	Pop 2020	% 1980	% 1990	% 2000	% 2010	% 2020
White alone (NH)	9,758	8,695	7,567	6,546	5,434	98.96%	98.20%	96.79%	96.55%	93.43%
Black or African American alone (NH)	3	4	2	6	8	0.03%	0.05%	0.03%	0.09%	0.14%
Native American or Alaska Native alone (NH)	62	105	74	70	60	0.63%	1.19%	0.95%	1.03%	1.03%
Asian alone (NH)	16	15	14	11	20	0.16%	0.17%	0.18%	0.16%	0.34%
Native Hawaiian or Pacific Islander alone (NH)	x	x	2	1	2	x	x	0.03%	0.01%	0.03%
Other race alone (NH)	6	0	7	3	10	0.06%	0.00%	0.09%	0.04%	0.17%
Mixed race or Multiracial (NH)	x	x	94	79	214	x	x	1.20%	1.17%	3.68%
Hispanic or Latino (any race)	16	35	58	64	68	0.16%	0.40%	0.74%	0.94%	1.17%
Total	9,861	8,854	7,818	6,780	5,816	100.00%	100.00%	100.00%	100.00%	100.00%

=== 2020 census ===
As of the 2020 census, the county had a population of 5,816. The median age was 59.1 years. 11.5% of residents were under the age of 18 and 36.9% of residents were 65 years of age or older. For every 100 females there were 105.5 males, and for every 100 females age 18 and over there were 105.6 males age 18 and over.

The racial makeup of the county was 94.1% White, 0.1% Black or African American, 1.1% American Indian and Alaska Native, 0.4% Asian, <0.1% Native Hawaiian and Pacific Islander, 0.2% from some other race, and 4.1% from two or more races. Hispanic or Latino residents of any race comprised 1.2% of the population.

<0.1% of residents lived in urban areas, while 100.0% lived in rural areas.

There were 2,966 households in the county, of which 13.8% had children under the age of 18 living in them. Of all households, 46.1% were married-couple households, 24.5% were households with a male householder and no spouse or partner present, and 23.2% were households with a female householder and no spouse or partner present. About 37.9% of all households were made up of individuals and 21.3% had someone living alone who was 65 years of age or older.

There were 5,244 housing units, of which 43.4% were vacant. Among occupied housing units, 87.0% were owner-occupied and 13.0% were renter-occupied. The homeowner vacancy rate was 2.5% and the rental vacancy rate was 17.3%.

=== 2010 census ===
The 2010 United States census indicated Ontonagon County had a population of 6,780. In 2010 there were 3,258 households and 1,954 families in the county. The population density was 6 people per square mile (2.3 people/km^{2}). There were 5,672 housing units at an average density of 4 per square mile (1.5/km^{2}). At the 2010 census, 97.3% of the population were White, 1.1% Native American, 0.2% Asian, 0.1% Black or African American, 0.1% of some other race and 1.3% of two or more races. 0.9% were Hispanic or Latino. The population was 51.6% male and 48.4% female.

In 2010, there were 3,258 households, out of which 15.8% had children under the age of 18 living with them, 50.3% were married couples living together, 6.0% had a female householder with no husband present, and 40.0% were non-families. 34.8% of all households were made up of individuals, and 17.0% had someone living alone who was 65 years of age or older. The average household size was 2.06 and the average family size was 2.61. The county population contained 15.8% under the age of 18, 4.1% from 18 to 24, 16.7% from 25 to 44, 37.0% from 45 to 64, and 26.3% who were 65 years of age or older. The median age was 52.7 years.

In 2010, the median income for a household in the county was $34,786, and the median income for a family was $46,845. The per capita income for the county was $22,195. About 9.0% of families and 14.3% of the population were below the poverty line, including 22.2% of those under age 18 and 6.7% of those age 65 or over.

=== 2021 estimate ===
At the 2021 census estimates, its median household income grew to $44,605.

== Communities ==
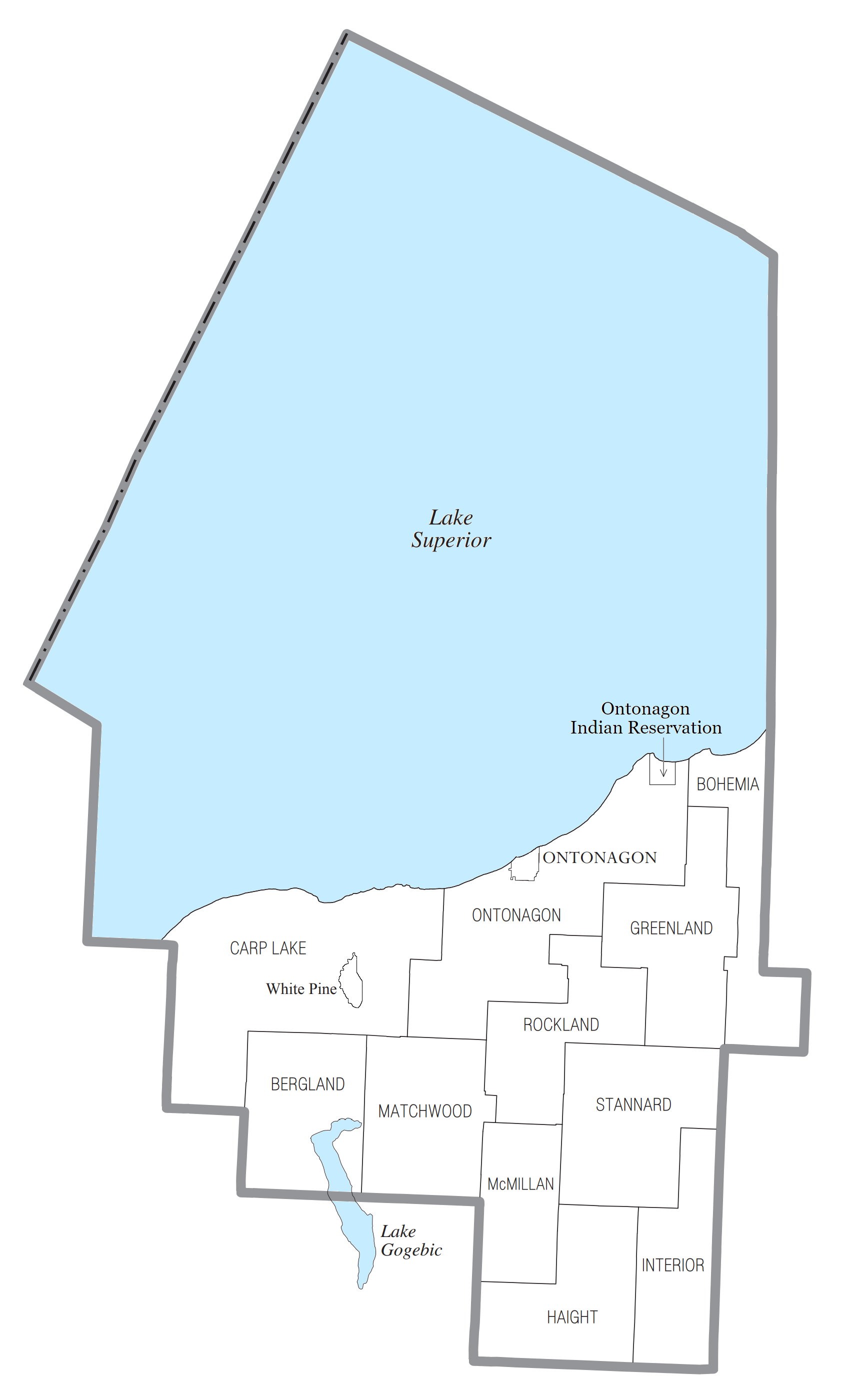
U.S. Census data map showing local municipal boundaries within Ontonagon County, as well as CDP boundaries

=== Village ===
- Ontonagon (county seat)

=== Civil townships ===
- Bergland Township
- Bohemia Township
- Carp Lake Township
- Greenland Township
- Haight Township
- Interior Township
- Matchwood Township
- McMillan Township
- Ontonagon Township
- Rockland Township
- Stannard Township

=== Census-designated places ===
- Bergland
- Bruce Crossing
- Ewen
- Greenland
- Lake Gogebic
- Mass City
- Rockland
- White Pine

=== Unincorporated communities ===
- Agate
- Algonquin
- Calderwood
- Carp Lake
- Craigsmere
- Maple Grove
- Matchwood
- Paulding
- Paynesville
- Robbins
- Trout Creek
- Victoria

=== Ghost town ===
- Adventure

=== Indian reservation ===
- The Ontonagon Indian Reservation, a branch of the Lake Superior Chippewa, has a reservation in the northeastern section of Ontonagon Township on the shores of Lake Superior. The reservation occupies 3.775 square miles (9.777 km^{2}) of land but recorded no permanent population at the 2010 census.

== Government ==
Ontonagon County is fairly balanced to Republican-leaning. Since 1876 its voters have selected the Republican Party nominee in 63% (24 of 38) of the national elections through 2024. The last Democrat to carry the county was Barack Obama in 2008, and since then the Republican share of the vote has increased in every election. From 2016 onward, the Republican performance in the county has been the best since 1924.

United States presidential election results for Ontonagon County, Michigan
Year	Republican		Democratic		Third party(ies)	
Year	No.	%	No.	%	No.	%
1876	201	38.29%	321	61.14%	3	0.57%
1880	228	48.31%	218	46.19%	26	5.51%
1884	301	53.94%	233	41.76%	24	4.30%
1888	308	36.15%	542	63.62%	2	0.23%
1892	678	38.68%	1,041	59.38%	34	1.94%
1896	757	62.77%	416	34.49%	33	2.74%
1900	982	68.82%	429	30.06%	16	1.12%
1904	1,345	77.08%	355	20.34%	45	2.58%
1908	1,249	71.37%	425	24.29%	76	4.34%
1912	719	41.13%	359	20.54%	670	38.33%
1916	1,235	54.29%	888	39.03%	152	6.68%
1920	1,977	67.71%	657	22.50%	286	9.79%
1924	2,249	71.42%	417	13.24%	483	15.34%
1928	2,394	59.66%	1,353	33.72%	266	6.63%
1932	2,287	45.53%	2,337	46.53%	399	7.94%
1936	2,162	38.86%	3,233	58.12%	168	3.02%
1940	2,880	47.09%	3,103	50.74%	133	2.17%
1944	2,433	48.07%	2,611	51.59%	17	0.34%
1948	2,561	50.18%	2,163	42.38%	380	7.45%
1952	2,961	57.39%	2,134	41.36%	64	1.24%
1956	2,976	57.73%	2,175	42.19%	4	0.08%
1960	2,620	50.63%	2,553	49.33%	2	0.04%
1964	1,658	32.19%	3,485	67.67%	7	0.14%
1968	2,290	45.72%	2,462	49.15%	257	5.13%
1972	3,040	57.51%	2,140	40.48%	106	2.01%
1976	2,462	43.91%	3,104	55.36%	41	0.73%
1980	2,569	48.95%	2,375	45.26%	304	5.79%
1984	2,464	50.95%	2,350	48.59%	22	0.45%
1988	2,023	44.34%	2,517	55.17%	22	0.48%
1992	1,463	30.83%	2,451	51.65%	831	17.51%
1996	1,523	35.86%	2,080	48.98%	644	15.16%
2000	2,472	59.55%	1,514	36.47%	165	3.97%
2004	2,262	53.96%	1,863	44.44%	67	1.60%
2008	1,823	46.92%	1,966	50.60%	96	2.47%
2012	1,906	53.86%	1,586	44.81%	47	1.33%
2016	2,066	60.18%	1,176	34.26%	191	5.56%
2020	2,358	61.89%	1,391	36.51%	61	1.60%
2024	2,479	64.54%	1,313	34.18%	49	1.28%

United States Senate election results for Ontonagon County, Michigan1
Year	Republican		Democratic		Third party(ies)	
Year	No.	%	No.	%	No.	%
2024	2,387	63.25%	1,279	33.89%	108	2.86%

Michigan Gubernatorial election results for Ontonagon County
Year	Republican		Democratic		Third party(ies)	
Year	No.	%	No.	%	No.	%
2022	1,862	57.13%	1,319	40.47%	78	2.39%

Ontonagon County operates the County jail, maintains rural roads, operates the major local courts, records deeds, mortgages, and vital records, administers public health regulations, and participates with the state in the provision of social services. The county board of commissioners controls the budget and has limited authority to make laws or ordinances. In Michigan, most local government functions – police and fire, building and zoning, tax assessment, street maintenance etc. – are the responsibility of individual cities and townships.

=== Elected officials ===
- Prosecuting Attorney: Michael D. Findlay
- Sheriff: Dale Rantala
- County Clerk/Register of Deeds: Stacy C. Preiss
- County Treasurer: Jeanne M. Pollard
- Mine Inspector: Douglas Roberts

As of September 2018

== See also ==
- List of Michigan State Historic Sites in Ontonagon County, Michigan
- National Register of Historic Places listings in Ontonagon County, Michigan
- Copper Country
- Copper mining in Michigan
