= Corpse Pond =

Lake in the state of Michigan, United States

- Location within Michigan
- Location: Ontonagon County, Michigan, United States
- Coordinates: 46°20′44″N 89°0′9″W
- Basin countries: United States
- Surface elevation: 1,617 feet (493 m)

Corpse Pond is a small lake in Ontonagon County, Michigan, located at 46°20′44″N 89°0′9″W.

== See also ==
- List of lakes in Michigan
