= Rockland Township, Michigan =

- Civil township
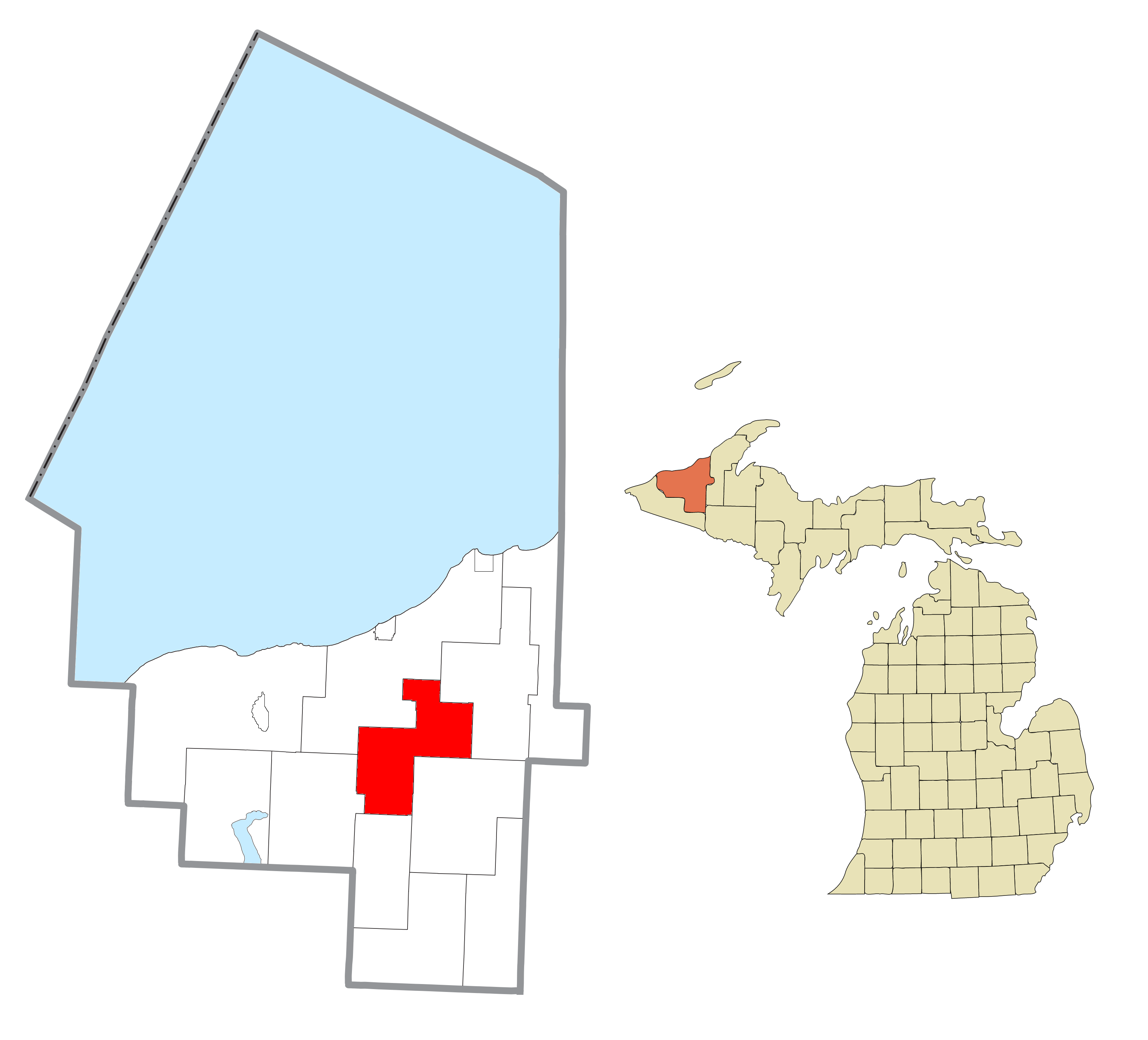
- Location within Ontonagon County

- Location within the state of Michigan Rockland Township (the United States)
- Coordinates: 46°43′18″N 89°12′43″W
- Country: United States
- State: Michigan
- County: Ontonagon

Government
  - Supervisor: Charles Pantti
  - Clerk: Peggy Killoran

Area
  - Total: 93.82 sq mi (243.0 km^{2})
  - Land: 92.75 sq mi (240.2 km^{2})
  - Water: 1.07 sq mi (2.8 km^{2})
- Elevation: 902 ft (275 m)

Population (2020)
  - Total: 226
  - Density: 2.46/sq mi (0.95/km^{2})
- Time zone: UTC-5 (Eastern (EST))
  - Summer (DST): UTC-4 (EDT)
- ZIP code(s): 49912 (Bruce Crossing); 49925 (Ewen); 49953 (Ontonagon); 49960 (Rockland)
- Area code: 906
- FIPS code: 26-69140
- GNIS feature ID: 1626992
- Website: https://www.rocklandmi.com/

Rockland Township is a civil township of Ontonagon County in the U.S. state of Michigan. The population was 226 at the 2020 census.

== Geography ==
According to the United States Census Bureau, the township has a total area of 93.82 square miles (242.99 km^{2}), of which 92.75 square miles (240.22 km^{2}) is land and 1.07 square miles (2.77 km^{2}) (1.14%) is water.

=== Communities ===
- Rockland is an unincorporated community and census-designated place in the township at 46°44′17″N 89°10′47″W. The Rockland Mine opened in 1847 and a post office named Rockland opened in January 1853 and closed in September 1860. A post office also opened at Minesota Mine in May 1857, which was renamed to National in March 1861. In December 1863, the National post office was changed to Rockford. A settlement named Rosendale was laid out by the Minesota Mining Company in 1858. Another settlement named Williamsburg was platted by William Sheppard and William Davey. A third settlement named Webster was platted by James Cooper. The three adjacent plats were consolidated into Rockland in 1864. Rockland has its own post office with the 49960 ZIP Code.
- Victoria was a settlement in the township housing workers at the Victoria Mine at 46°41′57″N 89°13′47″W. A post office was established September 1899. The village was abandoned after the mine closed in 1921, although the post office operated until December 1935. Like some other mines in the area, Victoria Mine was financed by British interests and was named for Queen Victoria.

== Notable people ==
- Jack Carkeek, a famous pro wrestler of the late 19th century, was born in Rockland.
- Joseph G. Pinten, Roman Catholic bishop, was born in Rockland.
