= Adventure, Michigan =

- Ghost town
- Location within the state of Michigan
- Coordinates: 46°46′22″N 89°04′54″W
- Country: United States
- State: Michigan
- County: Ontonagon
- Township: Haight
- Time zone: UTC-5 (Eastern (EST))
  - Summer (DST): UTC-4 (EDT)
- ZIP code(s): 49948 (Mass City)
- Area code: 906

Adventure, Michigan was a mining town in Ontonagon County in the U.S. state of Michigan. The mine was opened in 1850 and a post office operated in the town from 1851 to 1860.

== Sources ==
- Romig, Walter (1986). Michigan Place Names. Detroit: Wayne State University Press. p. 11. ISBN 978-0-8143-1838-6.
