= Robbins, Michigan =

- Unincorporated community
- Location within the state of Michigan Robbins (the United States)
- Coordinates: 46°22′55″N 89°13′33″W
- Country: United States
- State: Michigan
- County: Ontonagon
- Township: Haight
- Elevation: 1,316 ft (401 m)
- Time zone: UTC-5 (Eastern (EST))
  - Summer (DST): UTC-4 (EDT)
- ZIP code(s): 49912 (Bruce Crossing)
- Area code: 906
- GNIS feature ID: 1617821

Robbins is an unincorporated community in Ontonagon County in the U.S. state of Michigan. The community is located within Haight Township.

== History ==
A post office opened in Robbins in 1891, closed in 1898, reopened in 1902, and closed permanently in 1911. The community was named for F. S. Robbins, the owner of a local sawmill.
