= Ontonagon County Courthouse =

- U.S. National Register of Historic Places
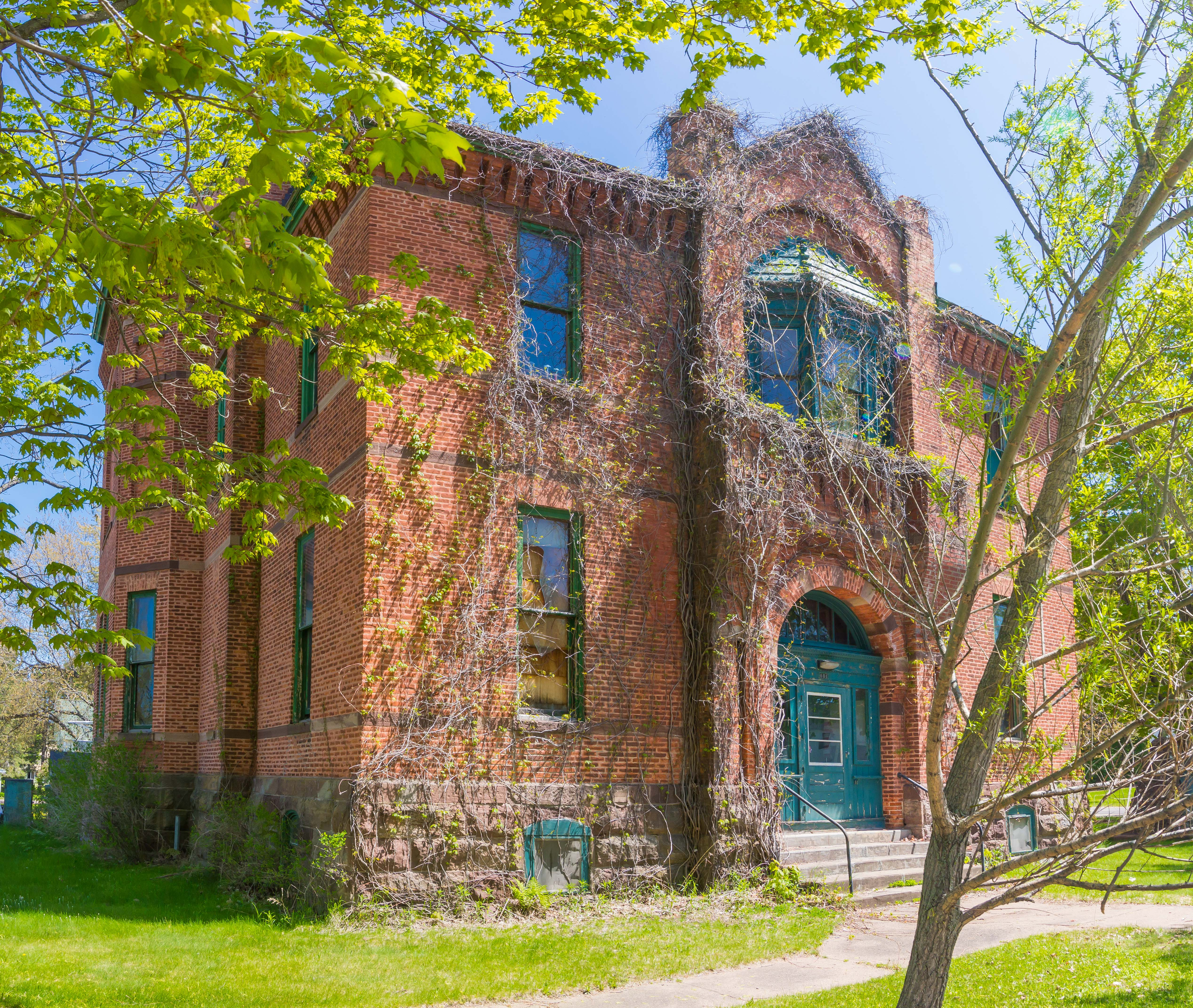

- Location within Michigan Location within the United States
- Interactive map showing the location for Ontonagon County Couerhouse
- Location: 601 Trap St., Ontonagon, Michigan
- Coordinates: 46.874671°N 89.317205°W
- Area: 1.4 acres (0.57 ha)
- Built: 1886
- Architect: Charlton, Gilbert & Demar
- Architectural style: Romanesque Revival
- NRHP reference No.: 80001888
- Added to NRHP: November 14, 1980

The Ontonagon County Courthouse is a government building located at 601 Trap Street in Ontonagon, Michigan. It was listed on the National Register of Historic Places in 1980.

== History ==
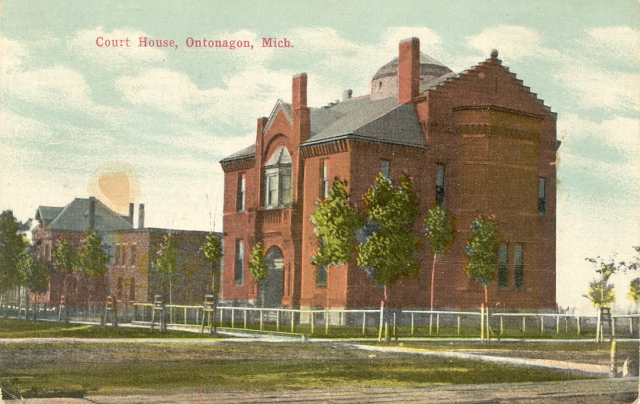

Ontonagon County was created in 1843 from the southwestern portion of Houghton County. However, the site of the current county seat was not decided until 1858, and a decision to build a proper courthouse was not made until 1884. The Ontonagon County Courthouse, designed by the architectural firm of Charlton, Gilbert & Demar, was completed in 1886. Ten years later in 1896, a disastrous fire destroyed most of the city, including this courthouse. However, the foundation and brick walls were salvaged, and the interior was redesigned and rebuilt. The near-destruction of Ontonagon came at a tumultuous time in Ontonagon County's history, soon after a portion of the county split off to form Gogebic County and while another section of Ontonagon was considering doing the same. Reconstruction of the town, its port, and the courthouse pulled the citizens of the county together.

An addition to the courthouse was built in 1937. As of 1980, the county built a new courthouse and the old one is no longer in use. The old court house is in private hands, and as of 2016 was owned by Jason Pragacz.

== Description ==
The Ontonagon County Courthouse is a two-story Romanesque Revival structure, built of brick on a sandstone foundation. Three sides have similar facades a central entrance in a gabled pavilion flanked by tall double-hung windows. The stone window lintels form part of a beltcourse that circles the building. A bay window is above the entrance, and the hipped roof has projecting dormers and a glass-roofed dome at the peak. The rear sports a rectangular addition.
