= Agate Falls Scenic Site =

Waterfall

Agate Falls
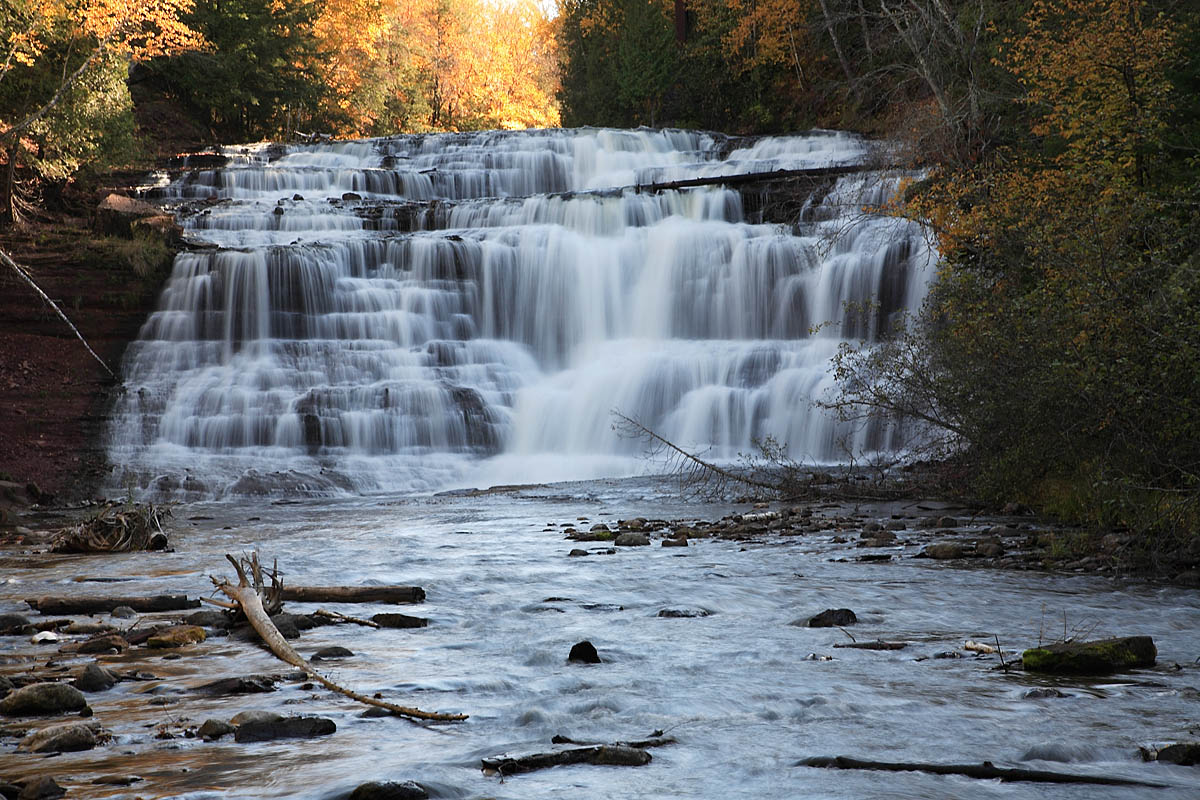
- Agate Falls on the Middle Branch
- Interactive map of Agate Falls
- Location: Ontonagon County, Michigan
- Coordinates: 46.48083°N 89.09096°W
- Type: Cascade
- Total height: 39 feet (12 m)
- Number of drops: 1
- Watercourse: Ontonagon River

The Agate Falls Scenic Site is a waterfall and scenic site located in Interior Township, in southeastern Ontonagon County, Michigan. The waterfall is 7 miles (11 km) southeast of Bruce Crossing, Michigan on the state highway M-28.

Agate Falls is a 39-foot-high (12 m) waterfall of the Middle Branch of the Ontonagon River. Dropping down from the highlands of the western Upper Peninsula, this river drops 875 feet (267 m) from the Bond Falls Flowage to Lake Superior, and Agate Falls is part of this change in elevation. The water flows over a shelf of erosion-resistant sandstone.

The falls can be seen from a trail accessible from a parking lot on M-28 or from a sturdy railroad bridge which now is part of a snowmobile and atv trail. This bridge, which once carried the tracks of the Duluth, South Shore and Atlantic Railway, spans the falls. A roadside picnic area offers simple recreational opportunities.

== See also ==
- List of waterfalls
