= Rockland, Michigan =

- Census-designated place (CDP) & unincorporated community
- Location within Michigan Location within the United States
- Coordinates: 46°44′16″N 89°10′45″W
- Country: United States
- State: Michigan
- County: Ontonagon
- Township: Rockland

Area
  - Total: 0.44 sq mi (1.14 km^{2})
  - Land: 0.44 sq mi (1.14 km^{2})
  - Water: 0 sq mi (0.00 km^{2})
- Elevation: 1,175 ft (358 m)

Population (2020)
  - Total: 173
  - Density: 392.2/sq mi (151.42/km^{2})
- Time zone: UTC-5 (Eastern (EST))
  - Summer (DST): UTC-4 (EDT)
- ZIP Code: 49960
- Area code: 906
- FIPS code: 26-69120
- GNIS feature ID: 2806354

Rockland is a census-designated place (CDP) and the primary community in Rockland Township, Ontonagon County, Michigan, United States. It is along US Highway 45, which leads north 11 miles (18 km) to its terminus at Ontonagon on Lake Superior, and south 61 miles (98 km) to Eagle River, Wisconsin.

As of the 2020 census, Rockland had a population of 173.

Rockland was first listed as a CDP prior to the 2020 census.

== Demographics ==
Historical population
Census	Pop.	Note	%±
2020	173		—
U.S. Decennial Census
