= Bergland, Michigan =

- Census-designated place (CDP) & unincorporated community
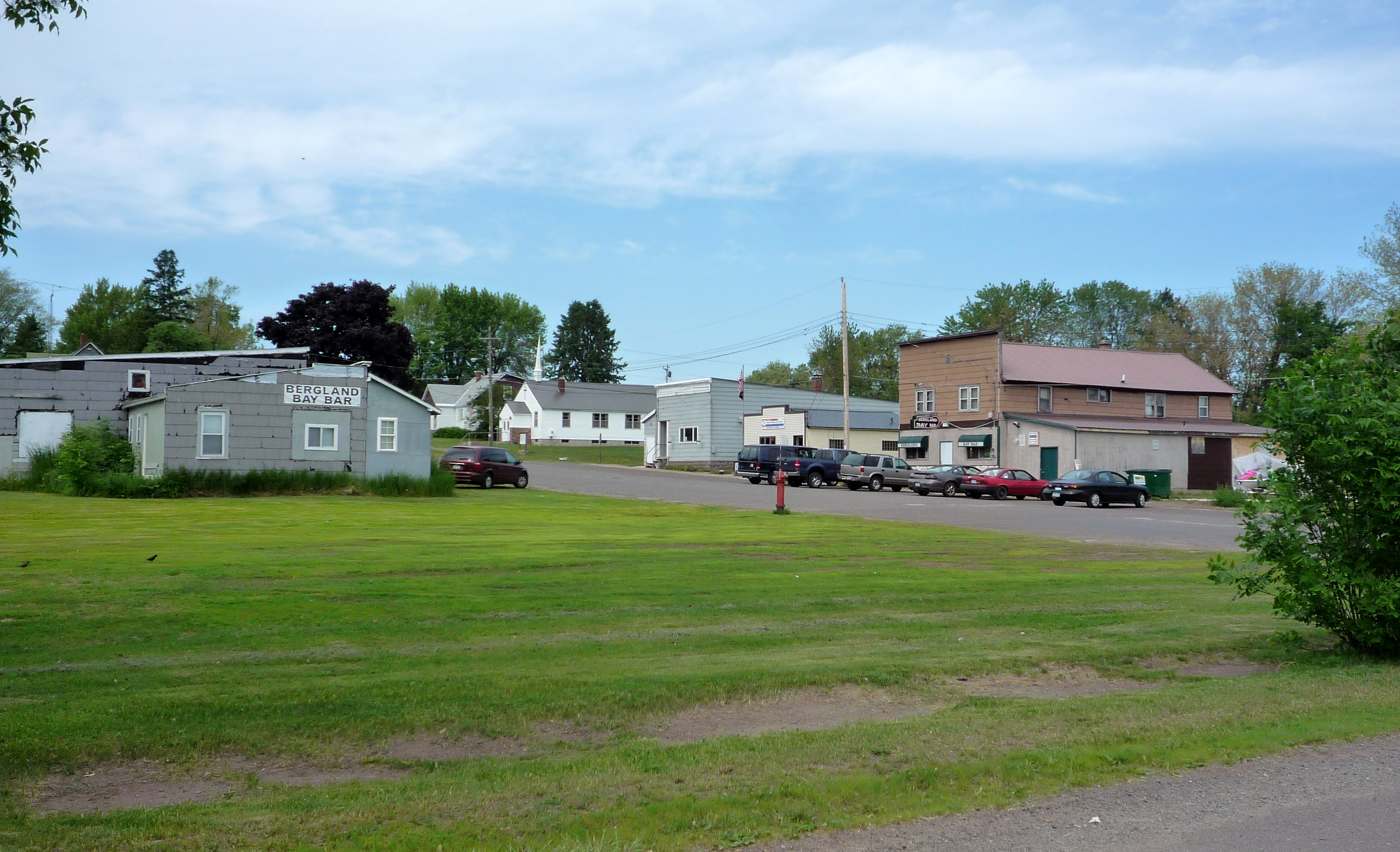

- Location within the state of Michigan Location within the United States
- Coordinates: 46°35′32″N 89°34′24″W
- Country: United States
- State: Michigan
- County: Ontonagon
- Township: Bergland

Area
  - Total: 1.04 sq mi (2.70 km^{2})
  - Land: 0.73 sq mi (1.89 km^{2})
  - Water: 0.31 sq mi (0.81 km^{2})
- Elevation: 1,329 ft (405 m)

Population (2020)
  - Total: 141
  - Density: 193.1/sq mi (74.55/km^{2})
- Time zone: UTC-5 (Eastern (EST))
  - Summer (DST): UTC-4 (EDT)
- ZIP code(s): 49910
- Area code: 906
- FIPS code: 26-07620
- GNIS feature ID: 2806348

Bergland is a census-designated place (CDP) and the primary community in Bergland Township, Ontonagon County, Michigan, United States. It is situated on the north shore of Lake Gogebic, the largest natural inland lake on the Upper Peninsula of Michigan. Highway M-28 passes through the center of town, leading east 19 miles (31 km) to Bruce Crossing and southwest 20 miles (32 km) to Wakefield. M-64 leads north from Bergland 17 miles (27 km) to the shore of Lake Superior and 30 miles (48 km) to Ontonagon, the county seat. Bergland is bordered to the west by the Lake Gogebic CDP.

As of the 2020 census, Bergland had a population of 141.

The community was first listed as a CDP prior to the 2020 census.

== Demographics ==
Historical population
Census	Pop.	Note	%±
2020	141		—
U.S. Decennial Census
