= Lake Gogebic =

Lake in the state of Michigan, United States

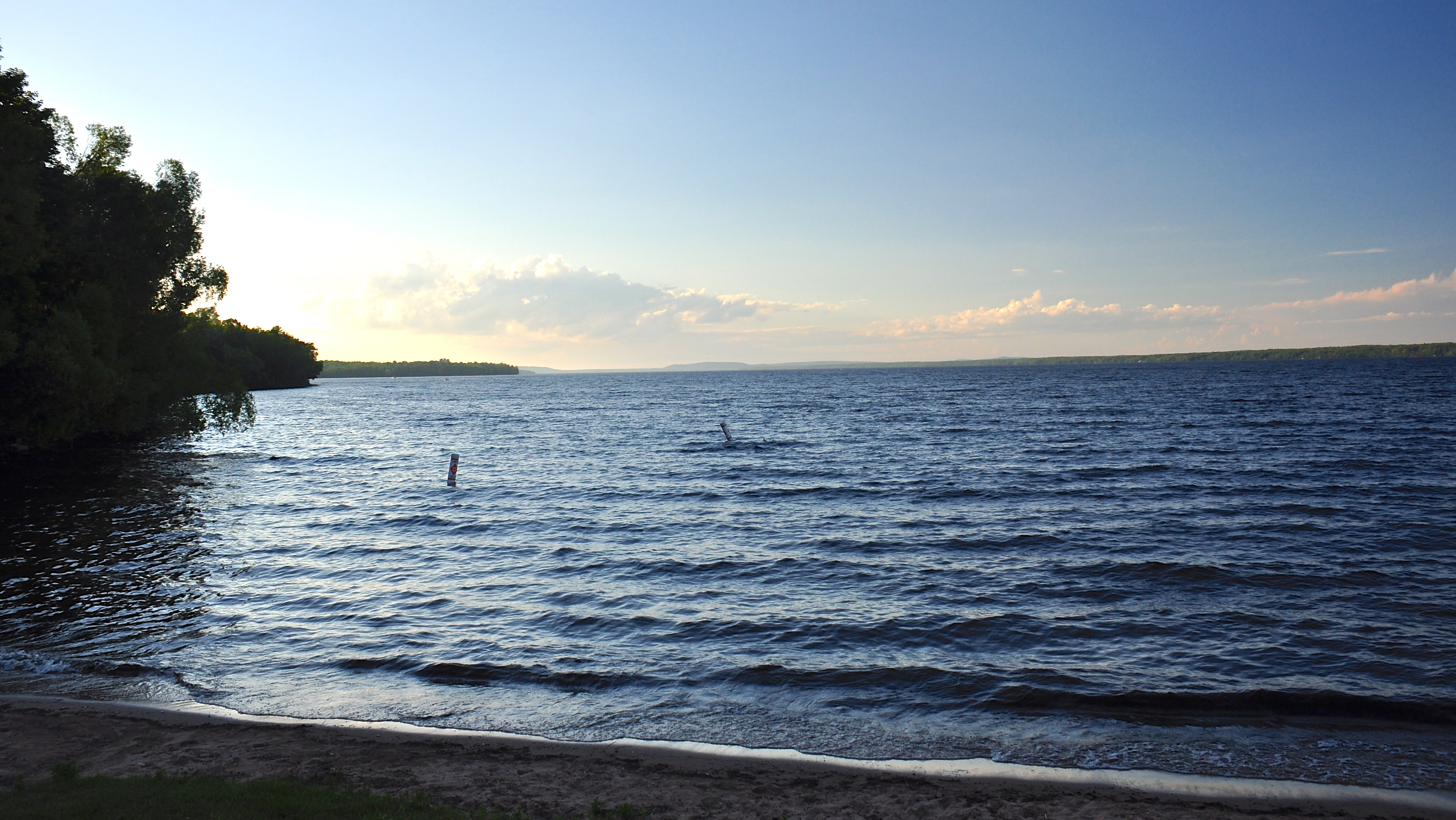
- Lake Gogebic viewed from Lake Gogebic State Park, July 2014.

- Location within Michigan
- Location: Gogebic / Ontonagon counties, Upper Peninsula of Michigan
- Coordinates: 46°30′N 89°35′W
- Type: Lake
- Primary inflows: Trout Brook, Merriwether River, Slate River
- Primary outflows: West Branch of Ontonagon River
- Basin countries: United States
- Max. length: 14 mi (23 km)
- Max. width: 2.5 mi (4.0 km)
- Surface area: 13,380 acres (54 km^{2})
- Average depth: 17.5 ft (5.3 m)
- Max. depth: 38 ft (12 m)
- Shore length^{1}: 34.35 mi (55.28 km)
- Surface elevation: 1,296 ft (395 m)
- Settlements: Bergland
- ^{1} Shore length is not a well-defined measure.

Lake Gogebic (/ɡoʊˈɡiːbɪk/ goh-GHEE-bik or /ɡoʊˈɡɪbɪk/ goh-GHIB-ik; Ojibwe: Ataagibiigamaa-zaaga'igan) is the largest natural inland lake of the Upper Peninsula of Michigan. It is located within the one million acre (4,000 km^{2}) Ottawa National Forest. Lake Gogebic State Park is located along its western shore.

It is in the far western end of the Upper Peninsula, close to the Wisconsin border, and in parts of two counties, Gogebic County and Ontonagon County. The lake is also in two time zones, central and eastern.

Though the lake is a natural body of water, the level is regulated by the Upper Peninsula Power Company through its Bergland Dam located downstream on the West Branch of the Ontonagon River.

In 2005 a state Department of Natural Resources survey found Black bullhead, Black crappie, Brown bullhead, Burbot, Cisco, Common shiner, Creek chub, Golden shiner, Northern pike, Pumpkinseed, Rock bass, Smallmouth bass, Walleye, White sucker, and Yellow perch in the lake.

== See also ==
- List of lakes in Michigan
