= Ewen, Michigan =

- Census-designated place (CDP) & unincorporated community
- Location within the state of Michigan Location within the United States
- Coordinates: 46°32′5″N 89°16′53″W
- Country: United States
- State: Michigan
- County: Ontonagon
- Township: McMillan

Area
  - Total: 0.84 sq mi (2.18 km^{2})
  - Land: 0.84 sq mi (2.18 km^{2})
  - Water: 0 sq mi (0.00 km^{2})
- Elevation: 1,142 ft (348 m)

Population (2020)
  - Total: 229
  - Density: 271.6/sq mi (104.88/km^{2})
- Time zone: UTC-5 (Eastern (EST))
  - Summer (DST): UTC-4 (EDT)
- ZIP Code: 49925
- Area code: 906
- FIPS code: 26-26820
- GNIS feature ID: 2806350

Ewen (/ˈjuːən/ YEW-in) is an unincorporated community and census-designated place (CDP) in McMillan Township, Ontonagon County, Michigan, United States. It is situated on the Upper Peninsula of Michigan along Highway M-28, which leads east 39 miles (63 km) to Covington and west 35 miles (56 km) to Wakefield.

As of the 2020 census, Ewen had a population of 229.

Ewen was first listed as a CDP prior to the 2020 census.

== Demographics ==
Historical population
Census	Pop.	Note	%±
2020	229		—
U.S. Decennial Census
