= McMillan Township, Ontonagon County, Michigan =

McMillan Township, Michigan
- Civil township
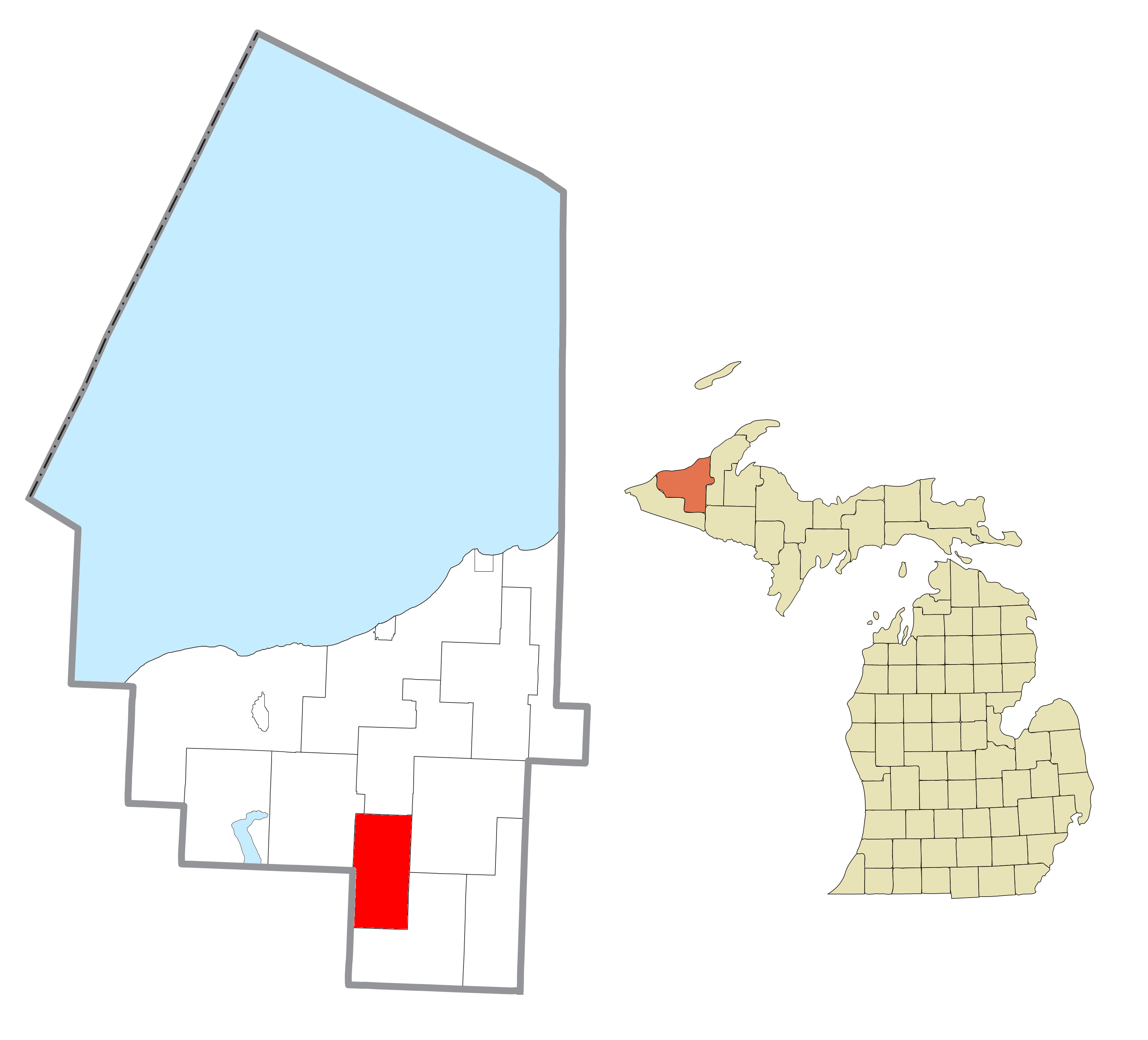
- Location within Ontonagon County

- Location within the state of Michigan McMillan Township (the United States)
- Coordinates: 46°31′42″N 89°17′03″W
- Country: United States
- State: Michigan
- County: Ontonagon

Government
  - Supervisor: Daniel Staff
  - Clerk: Bobbie Koski

Area
  - Total: 70.50 sq mi (182.6 km^{2})
  - Land: 70.43 sq mi (182.4 km^{2})
  - Water: 0.07 sq mi (0.18 km^{2})
- Elevation: 1,201 ft (366 m)

Population (2020)
  - Total: 406
  - Density: 6.79/sq mi (2.62/km^{2})
- Time zone: UTC-5 (Eastern (EST))
  - Summer (DST): UTC-4 (EDT)
- ZIP code(s): 49912 (Bruce Crossing); 49925 (Ewen)
- Area code: 906
- FIPS code: 26-50460
- GNIS feature ID: 1626659

McMillan Township is a civil township of Ontonagon County in the U.S. state of Michigan. The population was 406 at the 2020 census.

== Geography ==
According to the United States Census Bureau, the township has a total area of 70.50 square miles (182.59 km^{2}), of which 70.43 square miles (182.41 km^{2}) is land and 0.07 square miles (0.18 km^{2}) (0.10%) is water.

=== Communities ===
- Ewen is an unincorporated community and census-designated place at 46°32′07″N 89°16′52″W, near where M-28 crosses the south branch of the Ontonagon River. The community began as a logging camp in 1888 and in 1889 gained a depot named Ewen Station on the Duluth, South Shore and Atlantic Railway (now the Soo Line Railroad). It was named for W. A. Ewen, a treasurer of the railroad. It also received a Post Office named Ewen Station in 1889, shortened to Ewen in 1894. The Ewen Post Office, ZIP code 49925, serves much of the township area. Bruce Crossing is about 5 miles east on M-28 and Matchwood about 6 miles west.
