= Verdant Lake =

Lake in the state of Michigan, United States

- Location within Michigan
- Location: Schoolcraft County, Michigan
- Coordinates: 46°10′39″N 86°32′50″W
- Basin countries: United States
- Surface area: 25 acres (10 ha)
- Surface elevation: 764 ft (233 m)

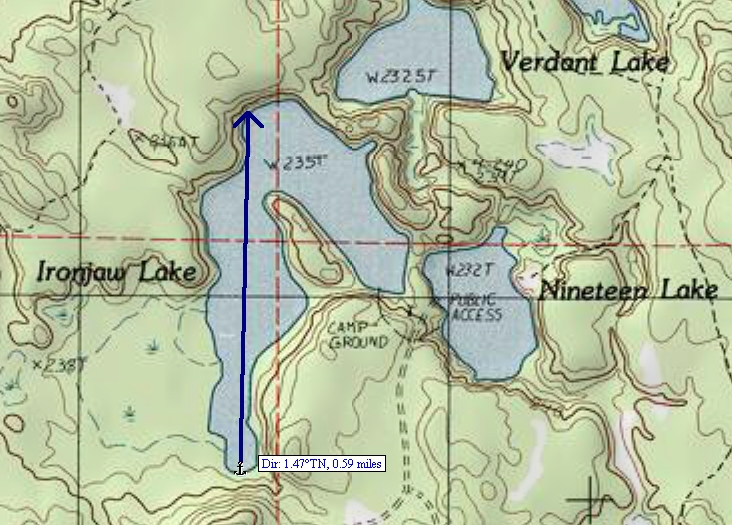
A topographical map of the Ironjaw Lake area showing Verdant Lake

Verdant Lake is a 25-acre (10 ha) lake that is located in south-western Schoolcraft County, Michigan in the Hiawatha National Forest. It is just east of the county line with Alger and just north of the county line with Delta County. Other nearby lakes include Hugaboom Lake, Mowe Lake, Blue Lake, Corner-Straits Chain of lakes, Nineteen Lake, Ironjaw Lake, and Round Lake.

== See also ==
- List of lakes in Michigan
