= Stoner Lake =

Lake in the state of Michigan, United States

- Location within Michigan Location within the United States
- Location: Alger and Delta counties
- Coordinates: 46°9′40″N 86°45′48″W
- Type: Lake
- Basin countries: United States
- Surface area: 72 acres (29 ha)
- Max. depth: 20 ft (6.1 m)
- Shore length^{1}: about 1.9 miles (3.1 km)
- Surface elevation: 794 ft (242 m)
- ^{1} Shore length is not a well-defined measure.

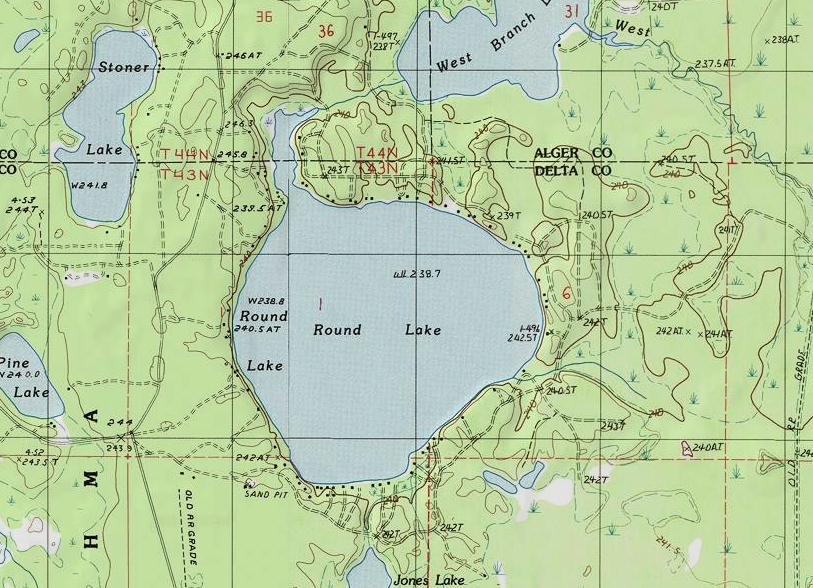
A topographic map of the Stoner and Round Lakes area

Stoner Lake is a 72-acre (29 ha) lake that is located in Alger County, Michigan with a small portion in Delta county in the Hiawatha National Forest. Other nearby lakes include Lake Stella, Round Lake, West Branch Lake, Hugaboom Lake, Blue Lake, Ironjaw Lake, Ostrander Lake, Corner-Straits Chain and Toms Lake.

== See also ==
- List of lakes in Michigan
