= Lake Stella =

Lake in the state of Michigan, United States

Lake Stella, Michigan
- Location within Michigan
- Location: Alger County, Michigan
- Coordinates: 46°10′47″N 86°46′33″W
- Type: Natural freshwater lake
- Basin countries: United States
- Max. length: 1.69 mi (2.72 km)
- Max. width: 0.43 mi (0.69 km)
- Surface area: 314 acres (127 ha)
- Surface elevation: 791 ft (241 m)
- Islands: 1 island, 1 islet

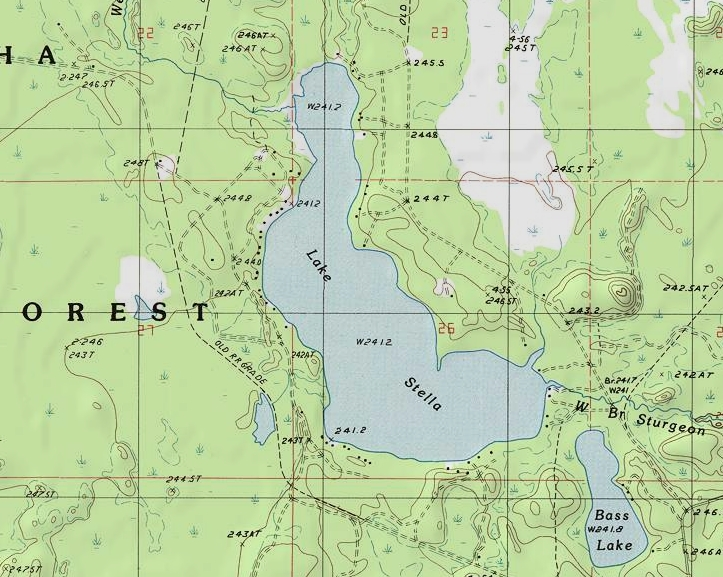
A topographic map of the area

Lake Stella is a 314-acre (127 ha) lake that is located in Alger County, Michigan in the Hiawatha National Forest. Other nearby lakes include Round Lake, Stoner Lake, West Branch Lake, Hugaboom Lake, Blue Lake, Ironjaw Lake, Ostrande Lake, Corner-Straits Chain and Toms Lake.

== See also ==
- List of lakes in Michigan
