= Lake Nineteen =

Lake in the state of Michigan, United States

- Nineteen Lake
- Location within Michigan
- Location: Schoolcraft County, Michigan
- Coordinates: 46°10′18″N 86°32′50″W
- Basin countries: United States
- Surface area: 26 acres (11 ha)
- Surface elevation: 761 ft (232 m)

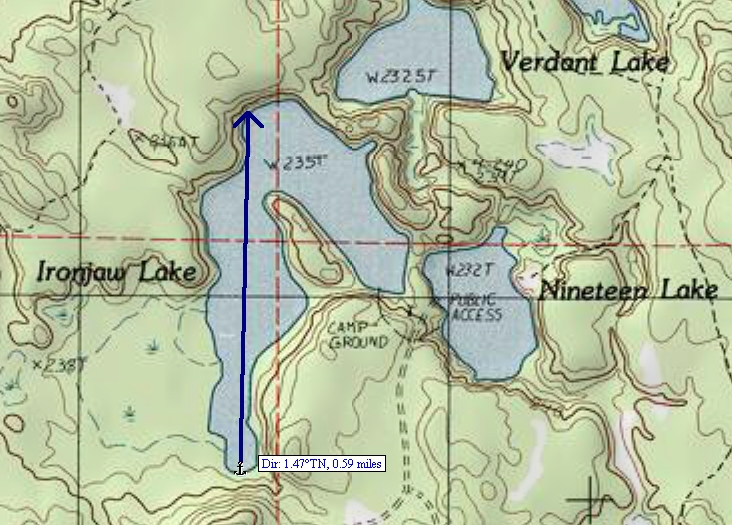
A topographical map of the Ironjaw Lake/Nineteen Lake area

Lake Nineteen also known as Nineteen Lake, is a 26-acre (11 ha) lake that is located in south-western Schoolcraft County, Michigan in the Hiawatha National Forest. It is east of the county line with Alger and north of the county line with Delta County. Nearby lakes include Hugaboom Lake, Mowe Lake, Blue Lake, Corner-Straits Chain of lakes, Ironjaw Lake, Verdant Lake, and Round Lake.

== See also ==
- List of lakes in Michigan
