= Protected areas of Michigan =

The protected areas of Michigan come in an array of different types and levels of protection. Michigan has five units of the National Park Service system. There are 14 federal wilderness areas; the majority of these are also tribal-designated wildernesses. It has one of the largest state forest systems as well having four national forests. The state maintains a large state park system and there are also regional parks, and county, township and city parks. Still other parks on land and in the Great Lakes are maintained by other governmental bodies. Private protected areas also exist in the state, mainly lands owned by land conservancies.

== Federal level ==
Michigan contains a number of different types of federally managed lands. There is one national park, Isle Royale National Park as well as two national lakeshores, Pictured Rocks National Lakeshore and Sleeping Bear Dunes National Lakeshore. There is also River Raisin National Battlefield Park, the Keweenaw National Historical Park and the Father Marquette National Memorial, although the latter is managed by the Michigan state park system for the national government.

Michigan has four national forests: two in the Lower Peninsula, Huron National Forest and Manistee National Forest as well as two in the Upper Peninsula, Ottawa National Forest and Hiawatha National Forest. The U.S. Forest Service owns 2.8 million acres (11,000 km^{2}) in these forests out of the designated areas which total 4.8 million acres (19,000 km^{2}) when including private inholdings. Several areas in the forests are designated wilderness and one area, Grand Island is a National Recreation Area. All sixteen National Wild and Scenic Rivers in Michigan are managed by the Forest Service. (See List of National Wild and Scenic Rivers#Michigan)

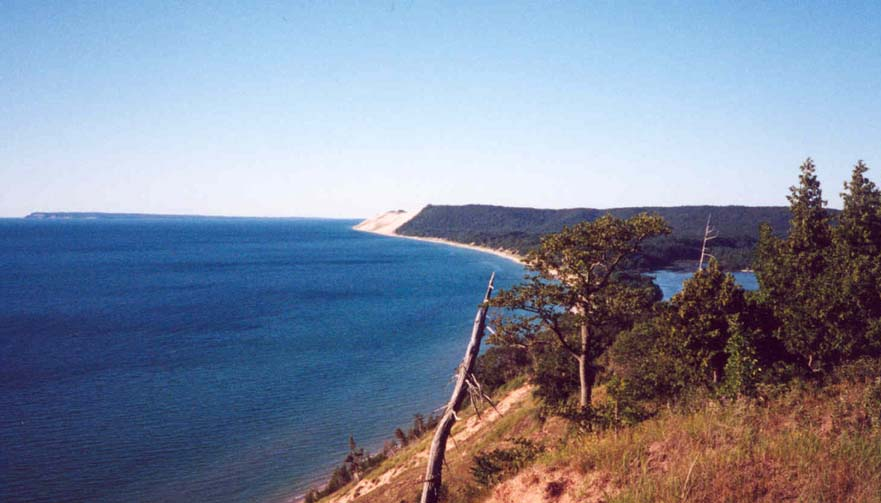
Sleeping Bear Dunes and South Manitou Island from Empire Bluff

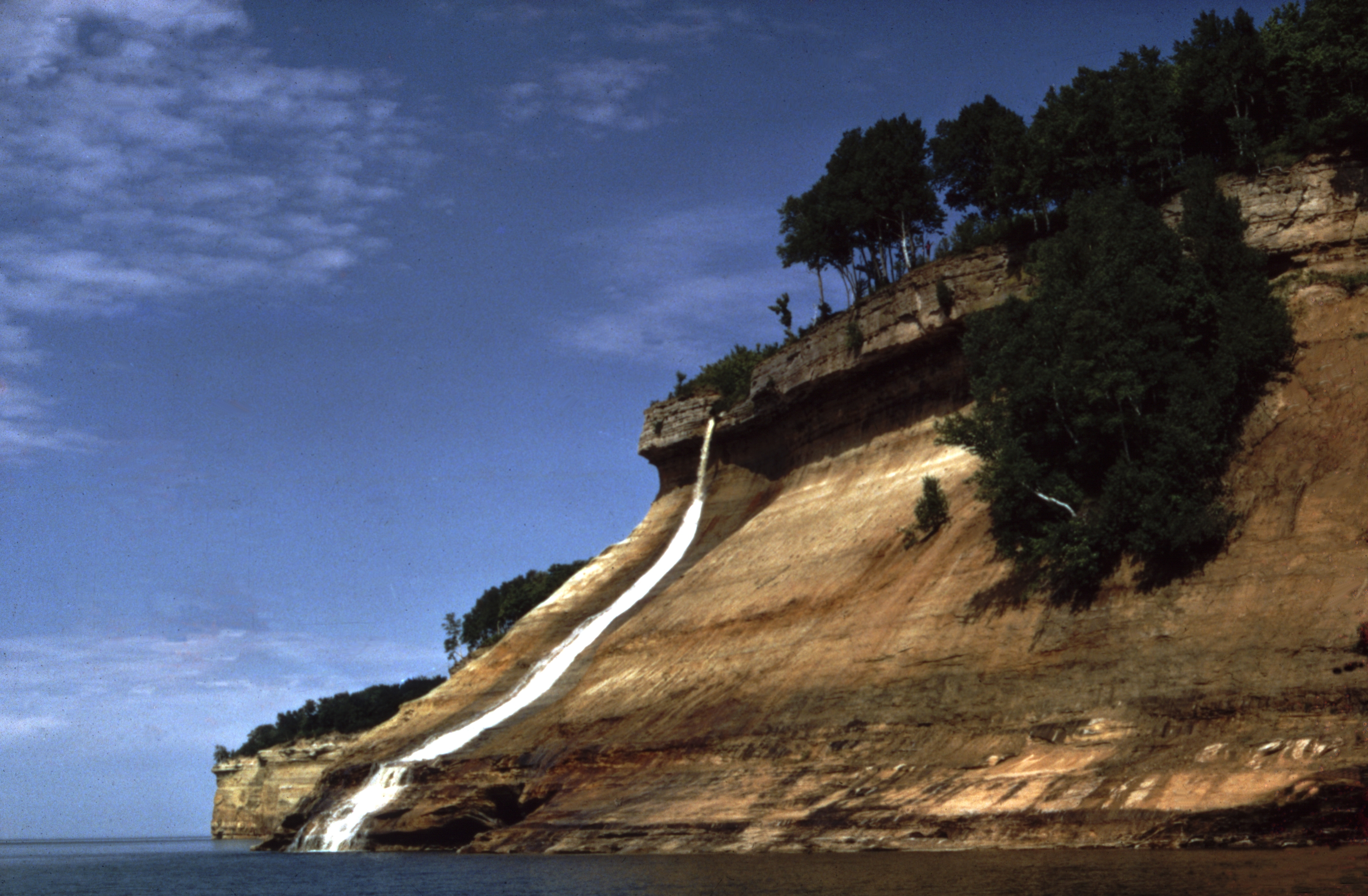
Bridalveil Falls at Pictured Rocks National Lakeshore

Fifteen federal wildernesses in Michigan cover 249,218 acres (1,009 km^{2}):

- One is almost congruent with Isle Royale National Park
- One, Beaver Basin, is managed by the National Park Service and is located within Pictured Rocks National Lakeshore.
- Three are managed by the U.S. Fish & Wildlife Service:
  - Michigan Islands Wilderness
  - Huron Islands Wilderness
  - Seney Wilderness
- Ten are located in National Forests and are managed jointly by the U.S. Forest Service and the Great Lakes Indian Fish & Wildlife Commission of Chippewa Indians:
  - McCormick Wilderness
  - Sturgeon River Gorge Wilderness
  - Sylvania Wilderness
  - Big Island Lake Wilderness
  - Delirium Wilderness
  - Horseshoe Bay Wilderness
  - Mackinac Wilderness
  - Rock River Canyon Wilderness
  - Round Island Wilderness
  - Nordhouse Dunes Wilderness

There are eight National Wildlife Refuges covering 113,639 acres (460 km^{2}) in the state. These include the first international refuge between the United States and Canada, the Detroit River International Wildlife Refuge. (See List of National Wildlife Refuges#Michigan)

The Thunder Bay National Marine Sanctuary and Underwater Preserve preserves an area of 448 square miles (1160 km^{2}) with 120 shipwrecks in Lake Huron and is managed jointly by the state and the National Oceanic and Atmospheric Administration.

== State level ==
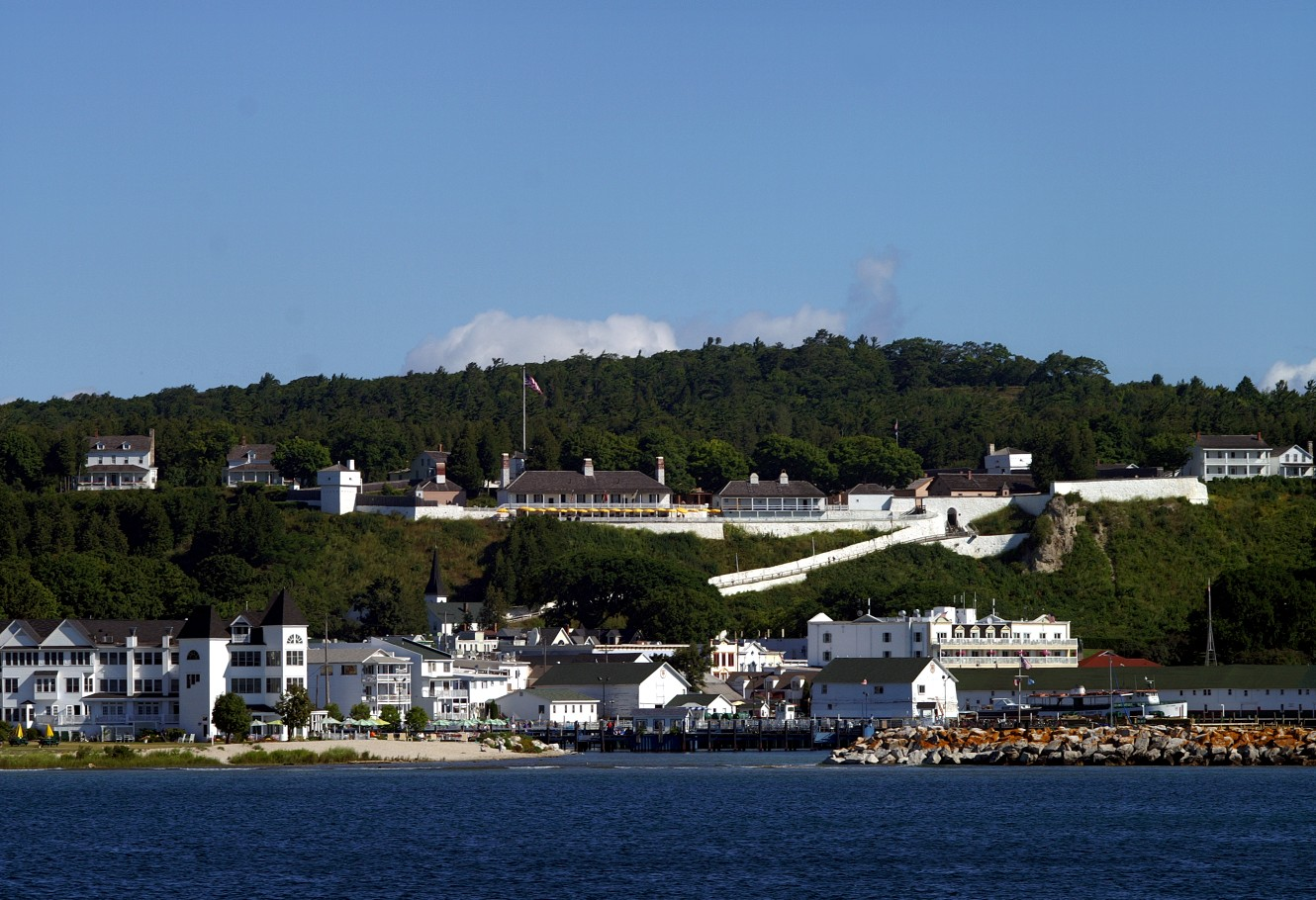
Fort Mackinac, part of Mackinac Island State Park

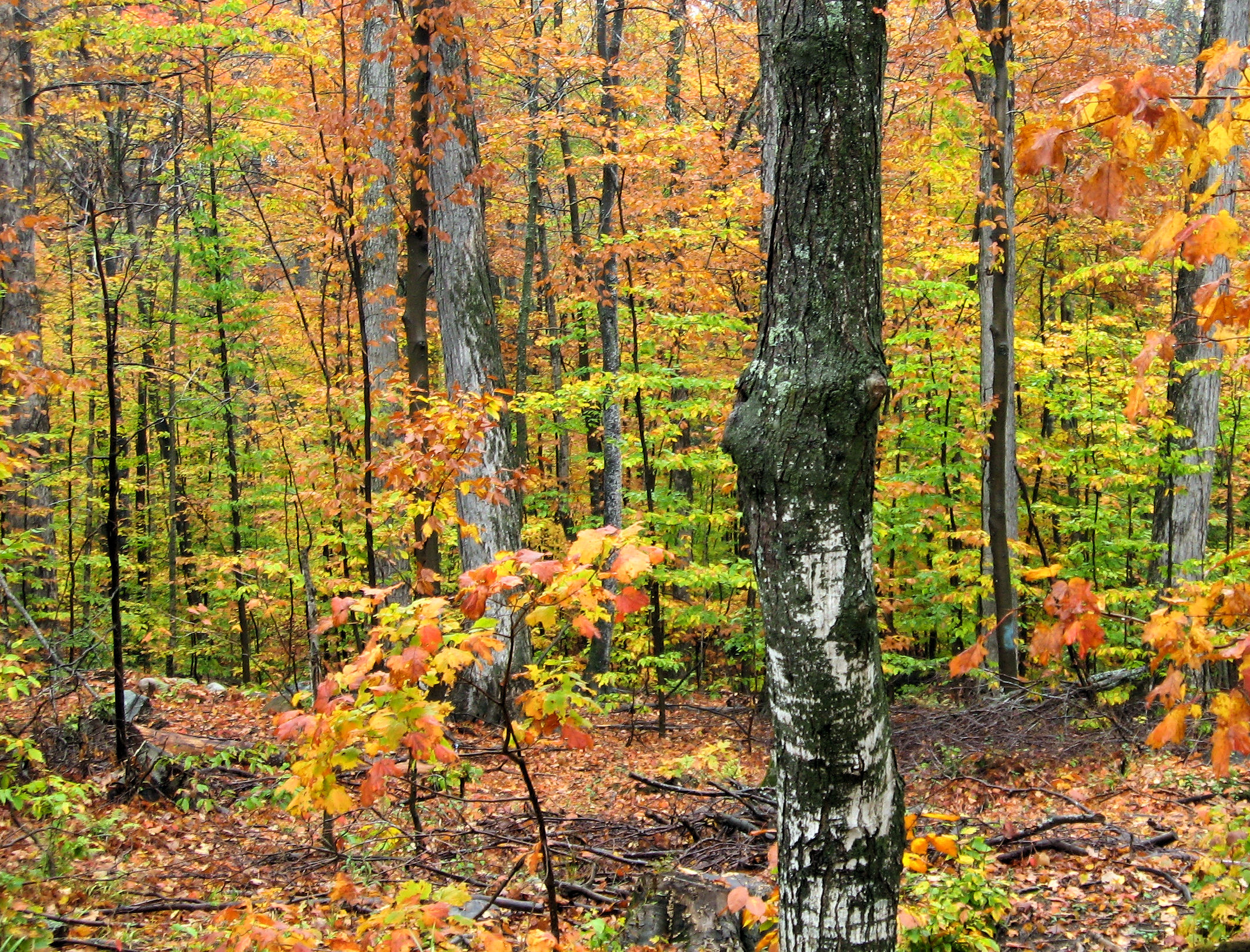
Autumn woods in Tahquamenon Falls State Park

The Michigan Department of Natural Resources manages state protected areas. These include 78 state parks; 19 state recreation areas, 6 state forests, and 5 state scenic sites. They also manage the Father Marquette National Memorial for the federal government. The MIDNR owns 4.5 million acres (18,000 km^{2}) of land, 6 million acres (24,000 km^{2}) of mineral rights, and manages 25 million acres (101,000 km^{2}) of Great Lakes' bottomlands. Most of the protected lands, almost 4 million acres (16,000 km^{2}) are in the state forest system. State parks range in size from 31 acres (0.25 km^{2}) (Tricentennial State Park) to 60,000 acres (243 km^{2}) (Porcupine Mountains State Park).

The state manages 66 state game areas primarily for hunting. Other areas include state wildlife areas, state wildlife research areas, and wildlife research stations. These cover approximately 340,000 acres.

- List of Michigan state parks
- List of Michigan state forests
- List of Michigan state game and wildlife areas
- List of U.S. state and tribal wilderness areas

== Local levels ==
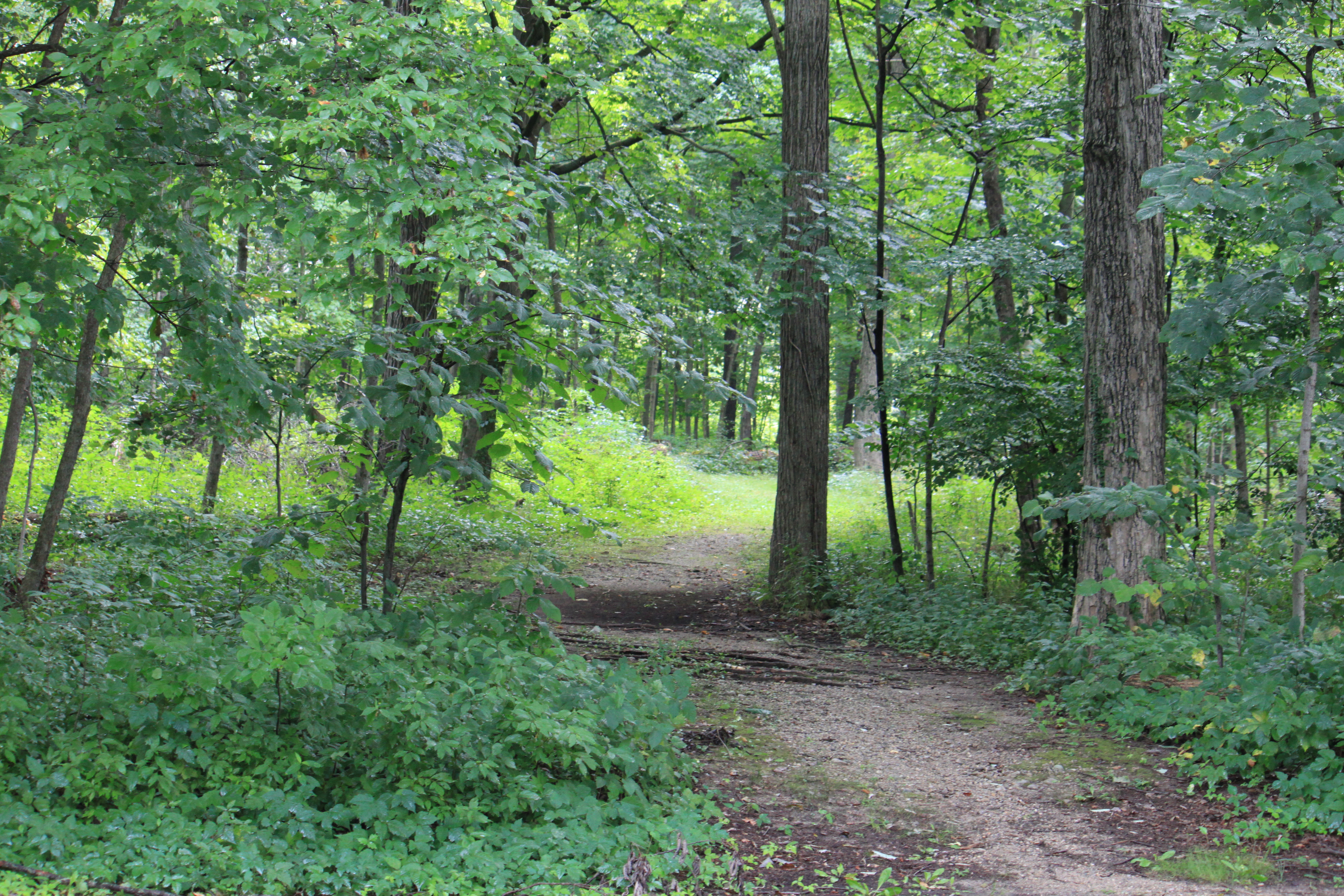
Nature trail in Dexter-Huron Metropark

A number of different local government bodies operate parks and protected areas. These include city parks which may be no more than a green space in a city to large regional park systems like the 24,000 acre (97 km^{2}) Huron-Clinton Metroparks. Michigan has county parks, township parks and at least one soil conservation district park among other types. Two state parks, Van Buren Trail State Park and Kal-Haven Trail are managed on the county level. Other protected areas include nature study areas owned by several colleges and universities throughout the state. The University of Michigan, for example, has the 350 acres (140 ha) Matthaei Botanical Gardens, 350 acres (140 ha) Nichols Arboretum, 777 acres (314 ha) Stinchfield Woods, and the University of Michigan Biological Station with 10,000 acres (4,000 ha) at Douglas Lake and 3,200 acres (1,300 ha) on Sugar Island. Michigan State University has the 4,600 acres (1,900 ha) Kellogg Biological Station.

== Private protected areas ==
A number of areas in Michigan are owned by private, non-profit land conservancies. These organizations sometimes donate or exchange land with government units and also purchase development rights from the owners of private lands. A large number exist, often with overlapping areas of operation. Many of these are open to public use, generally for nature study and some include hiking trails. According to the 2014 Protected Lands Survey conducted by Heart of the Lakes Center for Land Conservation Policy, its 27-member land conservancies have protected 588,000 acres of land in Michigan.
