= Ostrander Lake (Michigan) =

Lake in the state of Michigan, United States

- Location within Michigan
- Location: Alger, Schoolcraft, and Delta counties
- Coordinates: 46°10′00″N 86°36′46″W
- Basin countries: United States
- Surface area: 54.2 acres (21.9 ha)
- Shore length^{1}: about 1.4 miles (2.3 km)
- Surface elevation: 761 ft (232 m)
- ^{1} Shore length is not a well-defined measure.

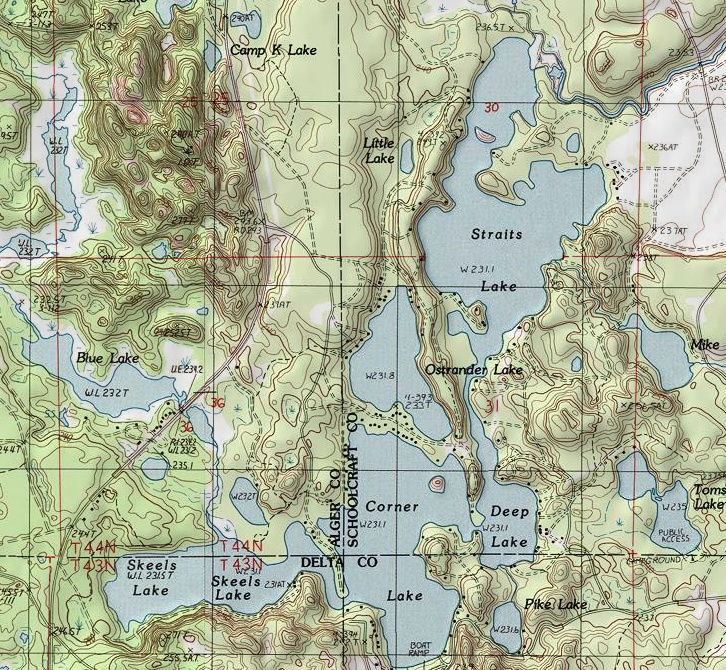
A topographic map of the Corner-Straits Chain area showing Ostrander Lake

Ostrander Lake is a 54.2-acre (21.9 ha) lake that is located near the tri-county corner of Delta County, Michigan, Alger and Schoolcraft countries in the Hiawatha National Forest. The chain consists of Skeels Lake, Corner Lake, Deep Lake, and Straits Lake. Other nearby lakes include Hugaboom Lake, Blue Lake, Ironjaw Lake, the Corner-Straits Chain of lakes, Toms Lake and Round Lake.

== See also ==
- List of lakes in Michigan
