= Toms Lake =

Lake in the state of Michigan, United States

- Location within Michigan
- Location: Alger, Schoolcraft, and Delta counties
- Coordinates: 46°9′43″N 86°35′38″W
- Basin countries: United States
- Surface area: 23 acres (9 ha)
- Surface elevation: 771 ft (235 m)

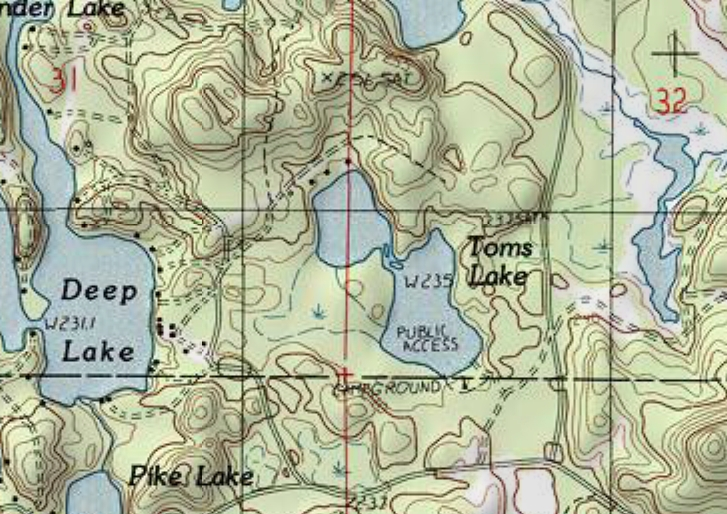
A topographic map of the area

Toms Lake is a 23-acre (9 ha) lake that is located at the tri-county corner of Delta County, Michigan, Alger and Schoolcraft countries in the Hiawatha National Forest. The forest service offers a rustic cabin for rent. Other nearby lakes include Hugaboom Lake, Blue Lake, Ironjaw Lake, Ostrande Lake, Corner-Straits Chain and Round Lake.

== See also ==
- List of lakes in Michigan
