= Big Island Lake =

Big Island Lake may refer to:

- Big Island Lake (Manitoba), a lake in Canada
- Big Island Lake (California), a lake in Yosemite National Park, California
- Big Island Lake Wilderness, a protected area in Michigan
