= Porcupine Mountains Ski Area =

Ski area in Michigan, United States

- Location within Michigan Location within the United States
- Location: Michigan, United States
- Nearest city: Silver City, Michigan
- Coordinates: 46.8°N 89.67°W
- Vertical: 560 ft (170 m)
- Top elevation: 1,338 ft (408 m)
- Base elevation: 911 ft (278 m)
- Skiable area: 250 acres (1.0 km^{2})
- Trails: 20
- Longest run: 1 mile (1.6 km)
- Lift system: 1 triple chairlifts, 1 rope tow, 1 paddle tow
- Snowfall: 200 inches (510 cm)
- Snowmaking: No
- Night skiing: No
- Website: https://porkies.ski/

The Porcupine Mountains Ski Area, also known as Ski the Porkies is a ski area located in the Porcupine Mountains State Park in Carp Lake Township near Silver City, Michigan, United States. Clearing of the area began on October 18, 1940, on Weather Horn Peak and finished by January 11, 1941. After being abandoned during World War II it was reopened in December 1949.
