= Manabezho Falls =

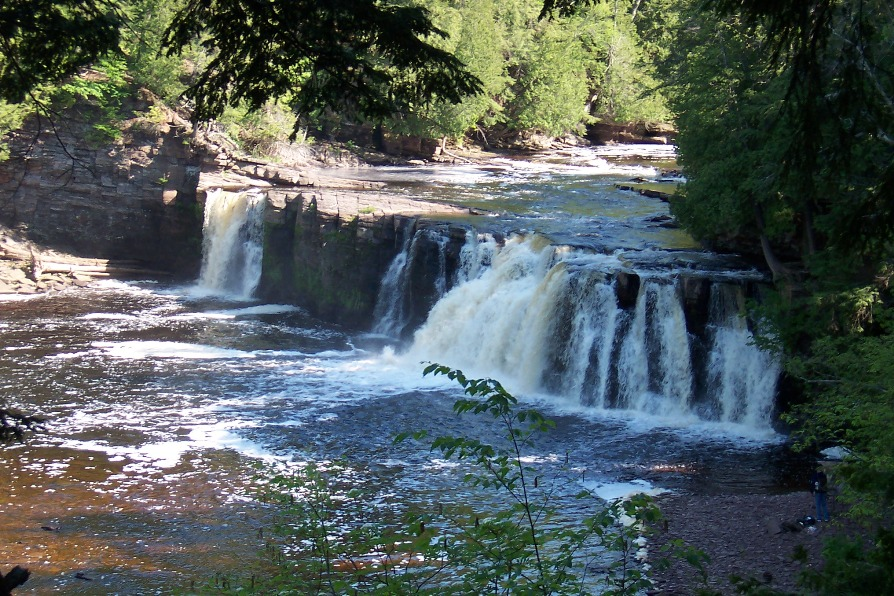
- Manabezho Falls
- Interactive map of Manabezho Falls
- Location: Porcupine Mountains, Gogebic County, Michigan, United States
- Coordinates: 46.7073°N 89.9718°W
- Type: Block
- Total height: 25 ft (7.6 m)
- Number of drops: 1
- Watercourse: Presque Isle River

Manabezho Falls is a waterfall on the Presque Isle River and is located in the Porcupine Mountains Wilderness State Park in Gogebic County, Michigan. With a drop of approximately 25 feet and a crest of 150 feet, it is the largest of the waterfalls on the river. It is below Manido Falls and Nawadaha Falls. The name Manabezho refers to an Ojibway spirit god. A view of the falls is easily accessible by trail.

== See also ==
- List of waterfalls
