= Nawadaha Falls =

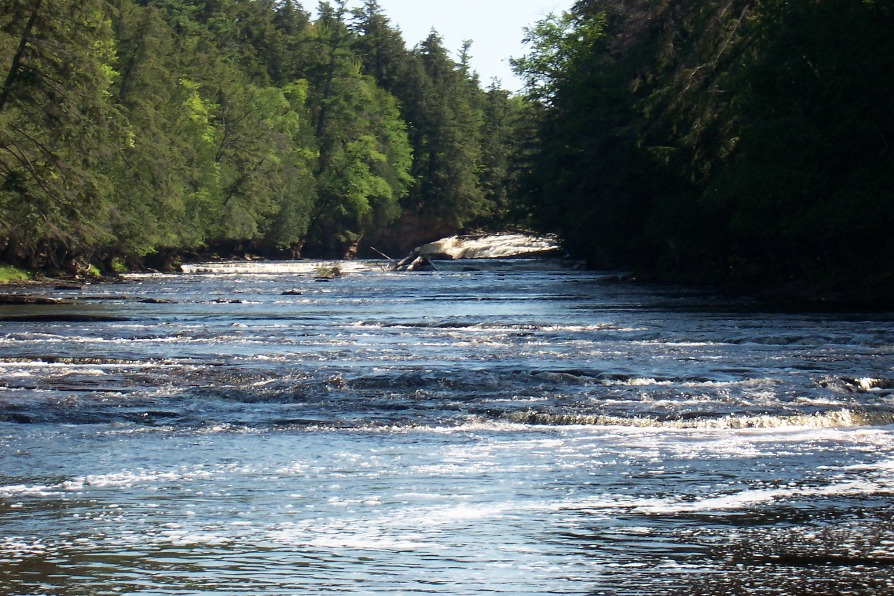
- Nawadaha Falls
- Interactive map of Nawadaha Falls
- Location: Porcupine Mountains, Gogebic County, Michigan, United States
- Coordinates: 46.6986°N 89.9747°W
- Type: Cascade
- Total height: 15 ft (4.6 m)
- Number of drops: 1
- Watercourse: Presque Isle River

Nawadaha Falls is a waterfall on the Presque Isle River and is located in the Porcupine Mountains Wilderness State Park in Gogebic County, Michigan. The falls has a drop of approximately 15 feet and a crest of 50–150 feet. It is above both Manido Falls and Manabezho Falls. Access to this waterfall requires climbing some rugged trails.
