= Rock River (Lake Superior) =

Coordinates: 46°27′55″N 86°54′52″W

Location
- Country: United States

Physical characteristics
- Source
  - location: Michigan

The Rock River is a 17.5-mile-long (28.2 km) river in Alger County on the Upper Peninsula of Michigan in the United States. It flows through the Rock River Canyon Wilderness of Hiawatha National Forest, then turns north and flows to Lake Superior at the village of Rock River.

== See also ==
- List of rivers of Michigan
