= Manido Falls =

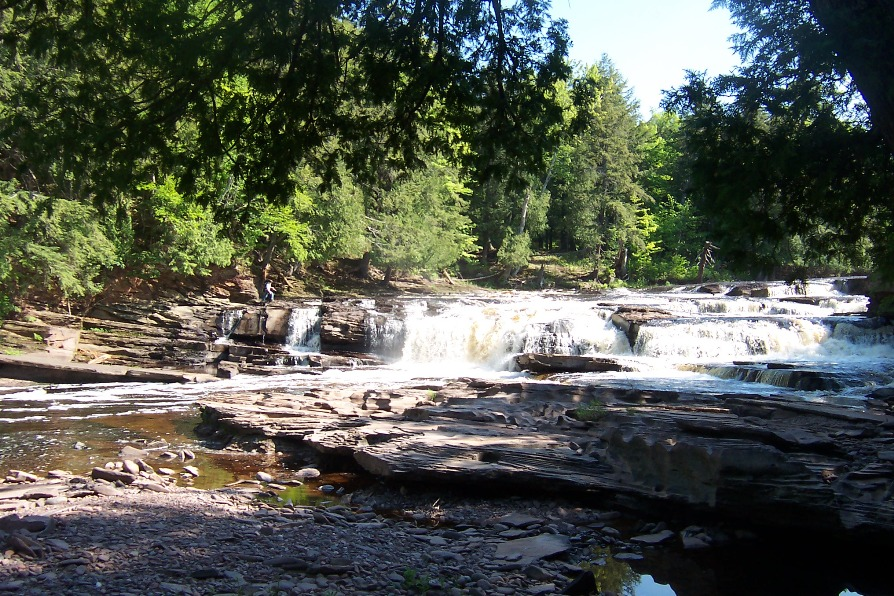
- Manido Falls
- Interactive map of Manido Falls
- Location: Porcupine Mountains, Gogebic County, Michigan, United States
- Coordinates: 46.7050°N 89.9707°W
- Type: Cascade
- Total height: 20 ft (6.1 m)
- Number of drops: 1
- Watercourse: Presque Isle River

Manido Falls is a waterfall on the Presque Isle River and is located in the Porcupine Mountains Wilderness State Park in Gogebic County, Michigan. With a drop of approximately 15 feet, it is the smallest of the waterfalls on the river. It has a crest between 50 and 150 feet, depending on the river volume. It is above Manabezho Falls and further down from Nawadaha Falls. The name Manido comes from the Ojibwe word meaning “spirit” or “ghost”. A view of the falls is easily accessible by trail.
