= Little Carp River (Gogebic-Ontonagon counties) =

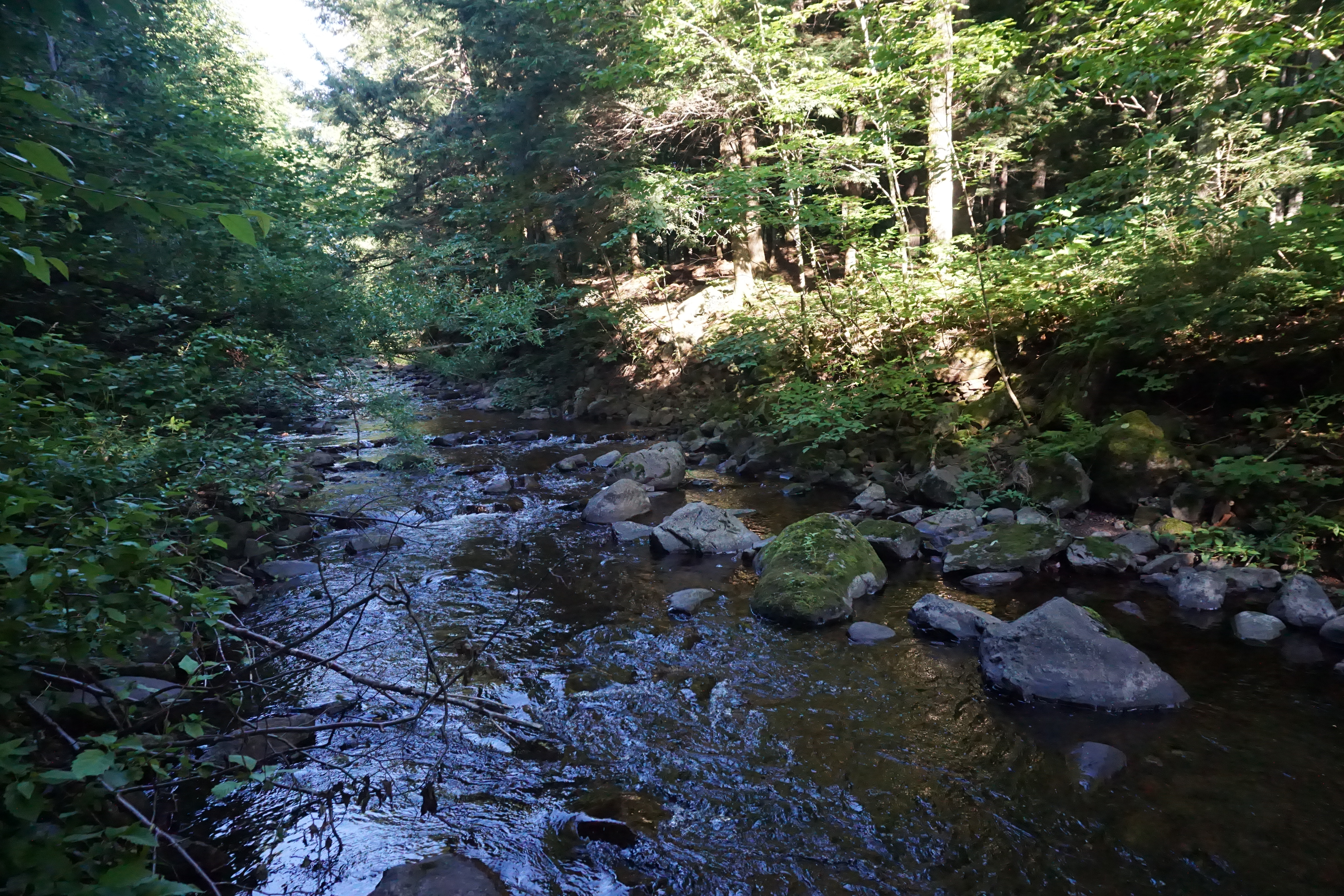
- Little Carp River in Porcupine Mountains Wilderness State Park, Michigan

Location
- Country: United States

Physical characteristics
- Source
  - location: Porcupine Mountains
- Mouth
  - location: Lake Superior
  - elevation: 604 ft (184 m)

The Little Carp River is a 15-mile-long (24 km) river in Gogebic and Ontonagon counties in the U.S. state of Michigan. The Carp River rises at 46°45′54″N 89°44′44″W in the Porcupine Mountains of the Upper Peninsula.

The river arches broadly southwest to northwest and empties into Lake Superior at 46°45′22″N 89°54′01″W approximately one mile from the mouth of the Carp River.

Tributaries and features (from the mouth):

- Traders Falls
- (left) Memengwa Creek
- Explorers Falls
- Trappers Falls
- (right) Wabeno Creek
- Greenstone Falls
- Overlooked Falls
- (right) Blowdown Creek
- (right) Beaver Creek
- Lily Pond
- Mirror Lake
  - Trail Creek
