= M108 =

M108 or M-108 may refer to

- M-108 highway (Michigan), a road in the United States
- M108 Howitzer, an American self-propelled 105 mm howitzer
- HMS Grimsby (M108), a minehunter in the Royal Navy
- Messier 108, a spiral galaxy in the constellation Ursa Major
