= White Pine, Michigan =

- Census-designated place (CDP) & unincorporated community
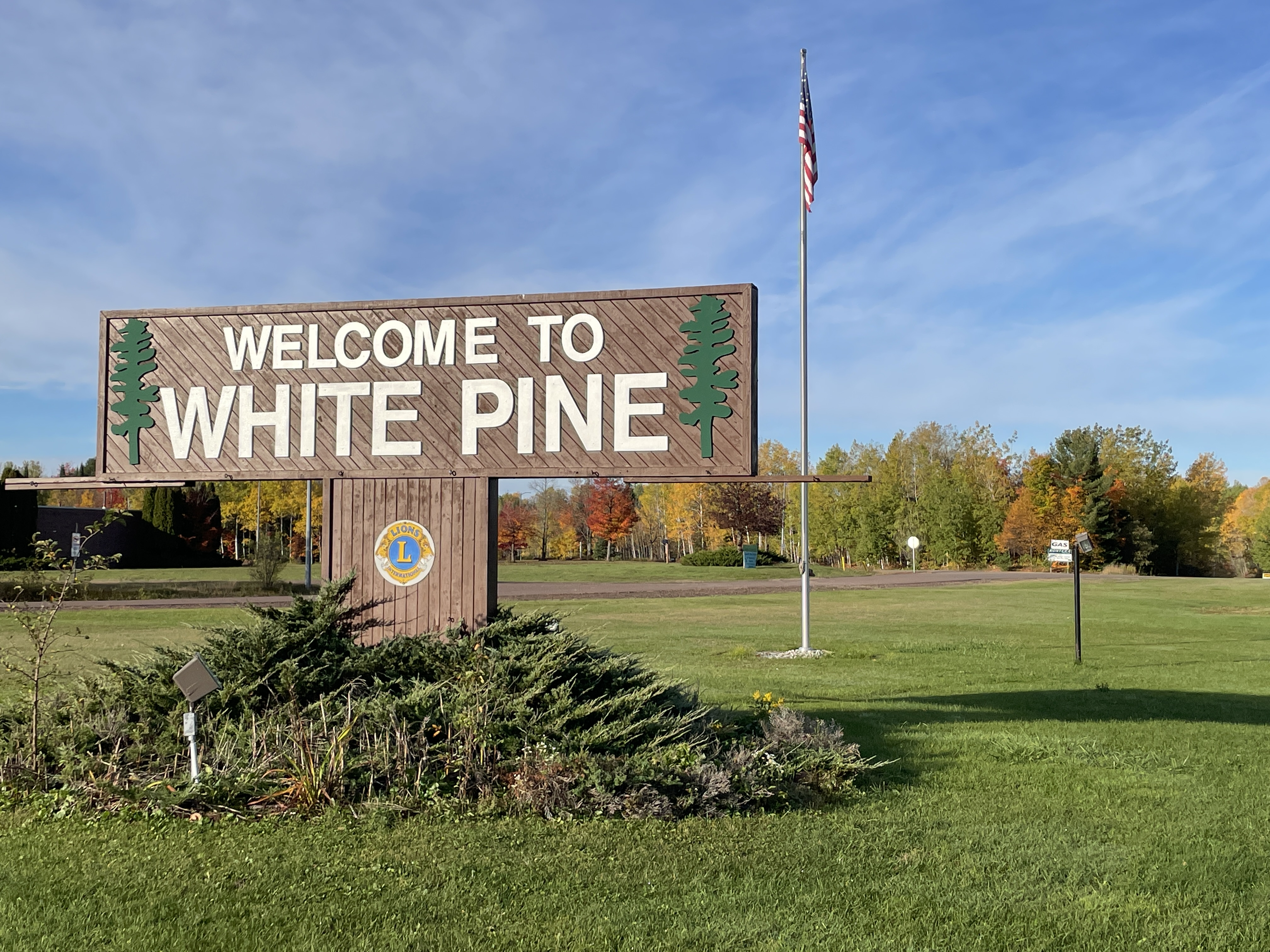
- Entry sign to White Pine, Michigan.

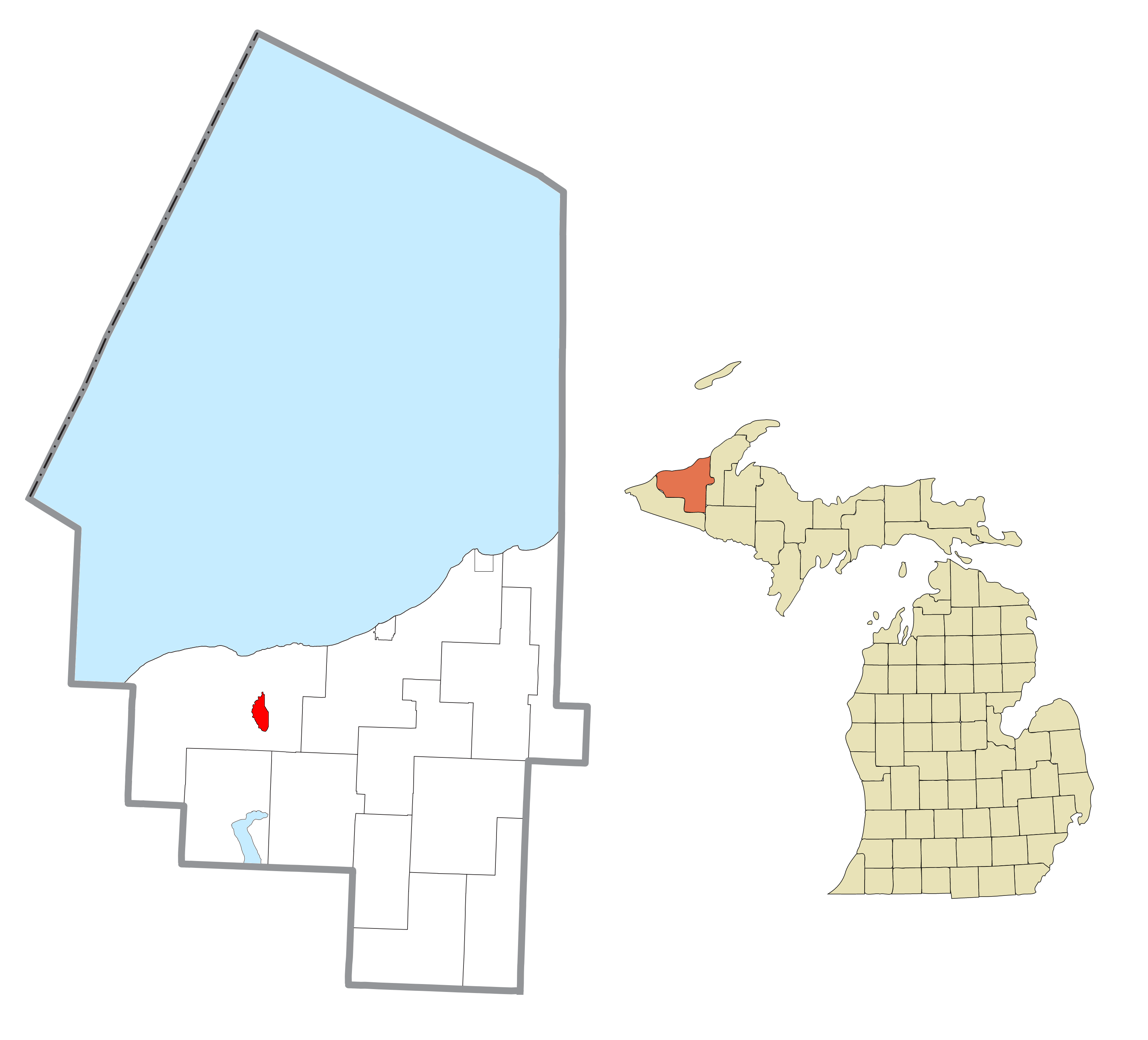
- Location within Ontonagon County

- Location within the state of Michigan White Pine (the United States)
- Coordinates: 46°45′14″N 89°35′03″W
- Country: United States
- State: Michigan
- County: Ontonagon
- Township: Carp Lake

Area
  - Total: 5.00 sq mi (12.96 km^{2})
  - Land: 5.00 sq mi (12.96 km^{2})
  - Water: 0 sq mi (0.00 km^{2})
- Elevation: 899 ft (274 m)

Population (2020)
  - Total: 339
  - Density: 67.8/sq mi (26.17/km^{2})
- Time zone: UTC-5 (Eastern (EST))
  - Summer (DST): UTC-4 (EDT)
- ZIP code(s): 49971
- Area code: 906
- GNIS feature ID: 1622143

White Pine is an unincorporated community and census-designated place (CDP) in Ontonagon County in the U.S. state of Michigan. As of the 2020 census, White Pine had a population of 339. White Pine is located within Carp Lake Township.

Much of White Pine was developed in the 1950s as a company town for miners at the White Pine mine. Mining companies in Michigan often built and leased housing to workers so that miners could live adjacent to mine operations. This allowed mining companies to attract workers with families, which were believed to improve retention rates by ensuring miners were socially and financially invested in the town created by the mining company.

White Pine was developed as a typical post war suburb. Many dwellings were single-story ranch homes, although a trailer park and apartment complex were also built. The community never developed fully as the Copper Range Company envisioned. The automobile transformed how workers commuted where previous mine sites had workers walking from nearby housing to the mine, many workers by the 1950s preferred driving up to 90 miles a day to remain in their current homes rather than move to the company town.

== History ==
It was a station on the Chicago, Minneapolis and St. Paul Railway. Thomas H. Wilcox, a mining engineer, found mass copper in the Mineral River and formed the White Pine Copper Company to mine it. The settlement was given a post office as "White Pine Mine" in June 1915.

The community of White Pine was listed as a newly-organized census-designated place for the 2010 census, meaning it now has officially defined boundaries and population statistics for the first time.

== Geography ==
According to the United States Census Bureau, White Pine has a total area of 5.00 square miles (12.95 km^{2}), all land.

White Pine is located within Carp Lake Township east of the Porcupine Mountains Wilderness State Park. The Copper Range Company operated the White Pine mine in White Pine from 1955 to 1995.

White Pine is served by the 49971 ZIP Code, which is the highest numeric ZIP Code in the state of Michigan.

== Demographics ==
Historical population
Census	Pop.	Note	%±
2020	339		—
U.S. Decennial Census
