= Carp River (Gogebic–Ontonagon counties) =

River in northern Michigan

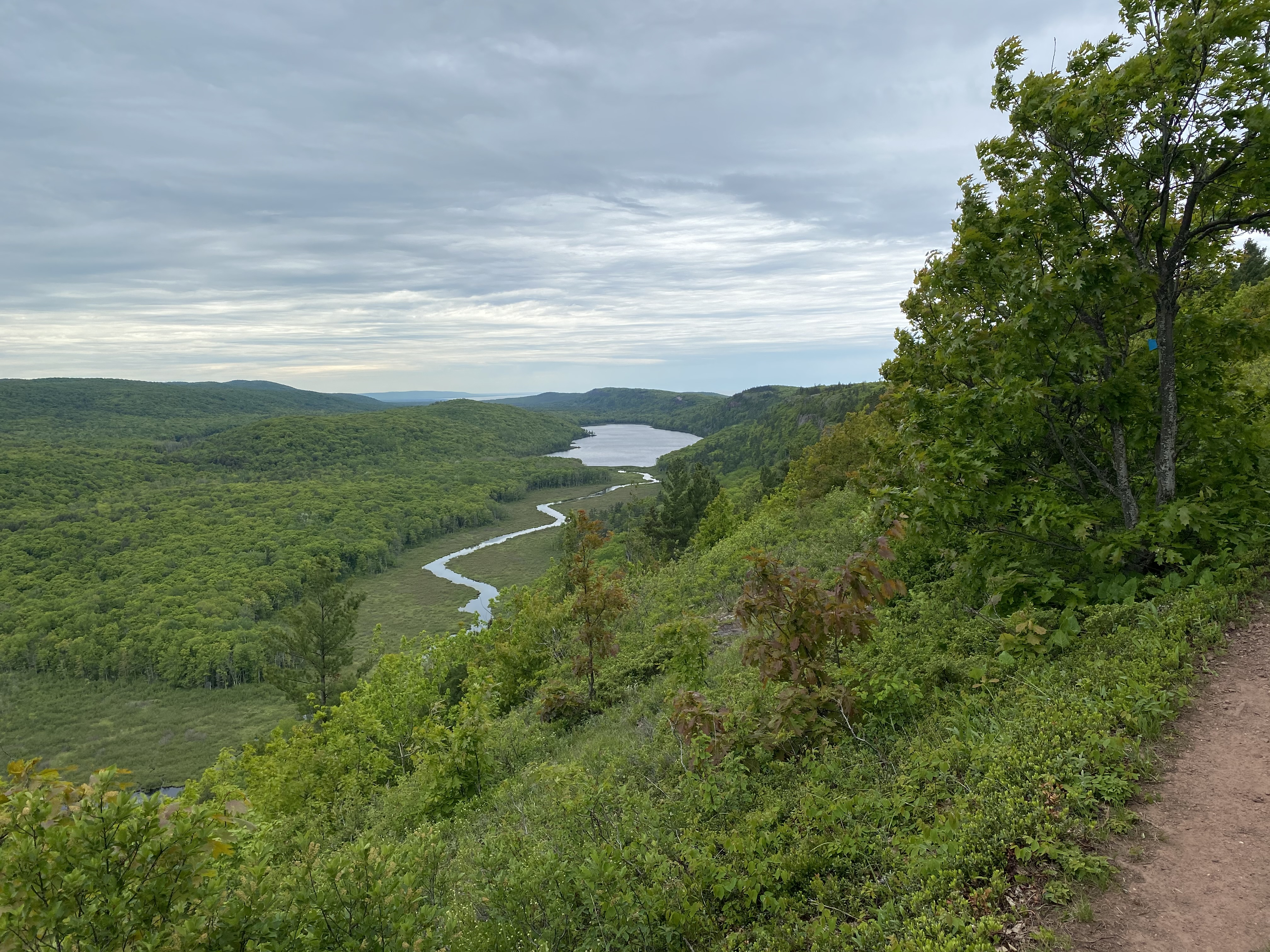
- The Carp River Inlet and Lake of the Clouds in the Porcupine Mountains.

- Location within Michigan Location within the United States

Location
- Country: United States
- State: Michigan

Physical characteristics
- Source: Lake of the Clouds
  - coordinates: 46.801057°N 89.7604375°W
- Mouth: Lake Superior
  - coordinates: 46.7676904°N 89.8851585°W
  - elevation: 604 ft (184 m)
- Length: 10.3 miles (16.6 km)

Basin features
- Tributaries
  - left: Scott Creek, Landlookers Creek, Konteka Creek
  - right: Washington Creek

The Carp River is a 10.3-mile-long (16.6 km) river in Gogebic and Ontonagon counties in the U.S. state of Michigan. The Carp River is formed by the outflow of the Lake of the Clouds at 46°48′04″N 89°45′38″W in the Porcupine Mountains of the Upper Peninsula.

The river flows generally west and southwest and empties into Lake Superior near the boundary between Gogebic and Ontonagon counties at 46°46′04″N 89°53′07″W.

The river is also known as the "Big Carp River" to distinguish it from the nearby Little Carp River.

Tributaries and features (from the mouth):

- Bathtub Falls
- Shining Cloud Falls
- (right) Konteka Creek
- (left) Washington Creek
- (right) Landlookers Creek
- (right) Scott Creek
- Lake of the Clouds
  - Carp River Inlet (also known as Carp River, Inlet Creek and Upper Carp River)
  - Trap Falls
