= Pine River (Mackinac County, Michigan) =

River in Michigan

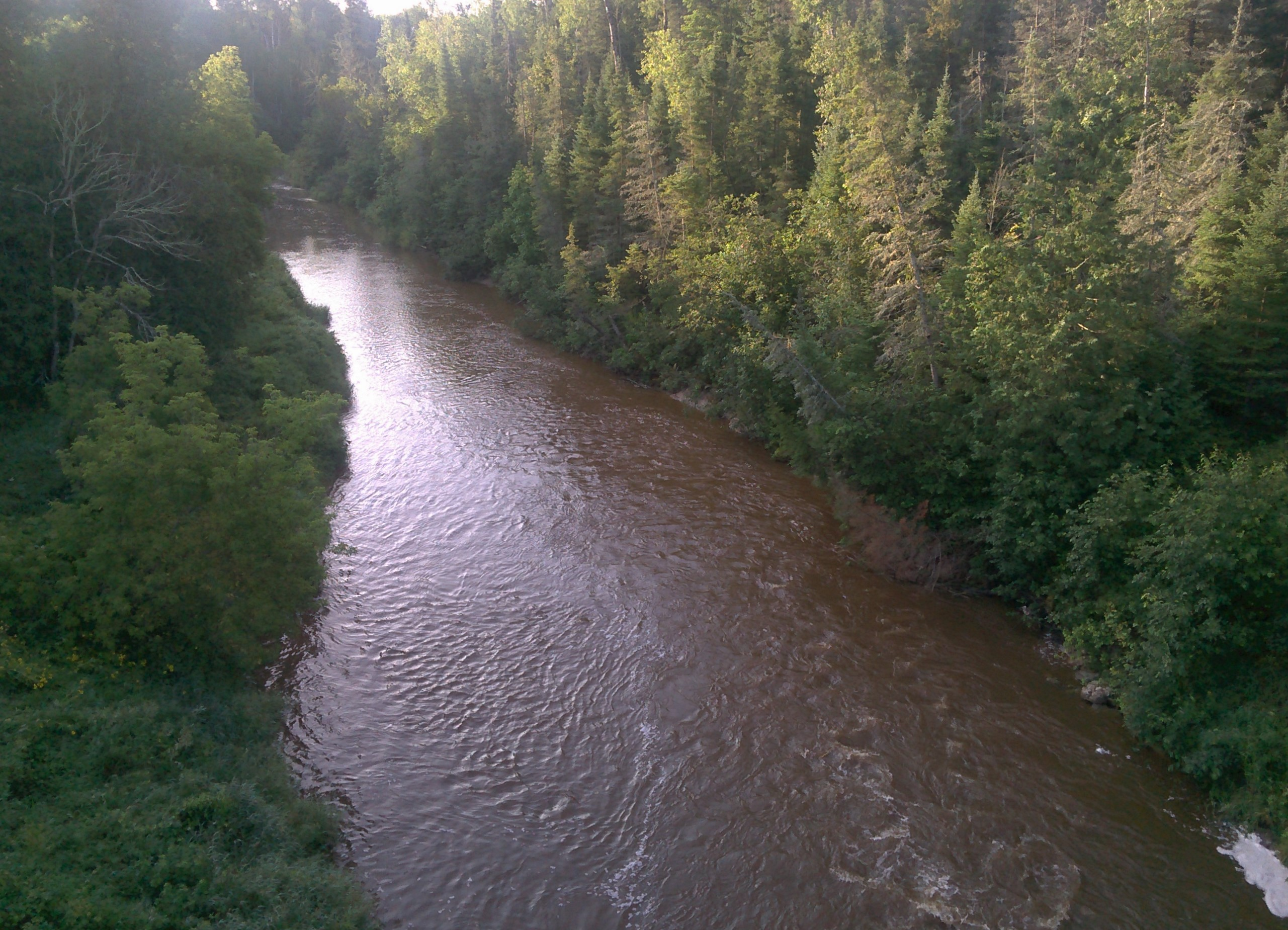
- View from H-63 in Rudyard Township

- Location within the state of Michigan

Location
- Country: United States
- State: Michigan
- Counties: Chippewa and Mackinac

Physical characteristics
- Source: Hiawatha National Forest
  - location: Chippewa Township, Michigan
  - coordinates: 46°16′27″N 84°56′04″W
  - elevation: 820 ft (250 m)
- Mouth: Lake Huron
  - location: St. Ignace Township, Michigan
  - coordinates: 46°03′09″N 84°39′22″W
  - elevation: 577 ft (176 m)

Pine River is a river in the Upper Peninsula of the U.S. state of Michigan. It rises in Chippewa County, flows into Mackinac County, and discharges into St. Martin Bay in the northwestern corner of Lake Huron.

== Description ==
The Pine River rises in the Hiawatha National Forest east of Trout Lake in Chippewa County. It draws water from a variety of sources, including water sources in the Delirium Wilderness near Raco. The river flows eastward through the national forest, following a bed of sandy wetlands, until it reaches drier ground around Rudyard. The river then turns south and enters Mackinac County. Flowing generally parallel to Interstate 75, the river flows into Lake Huron adjacent to the western terminus of State Highway M-134.
