= Presque Isle River =

Coordinates: 46°42′38″N 89°58′28″W

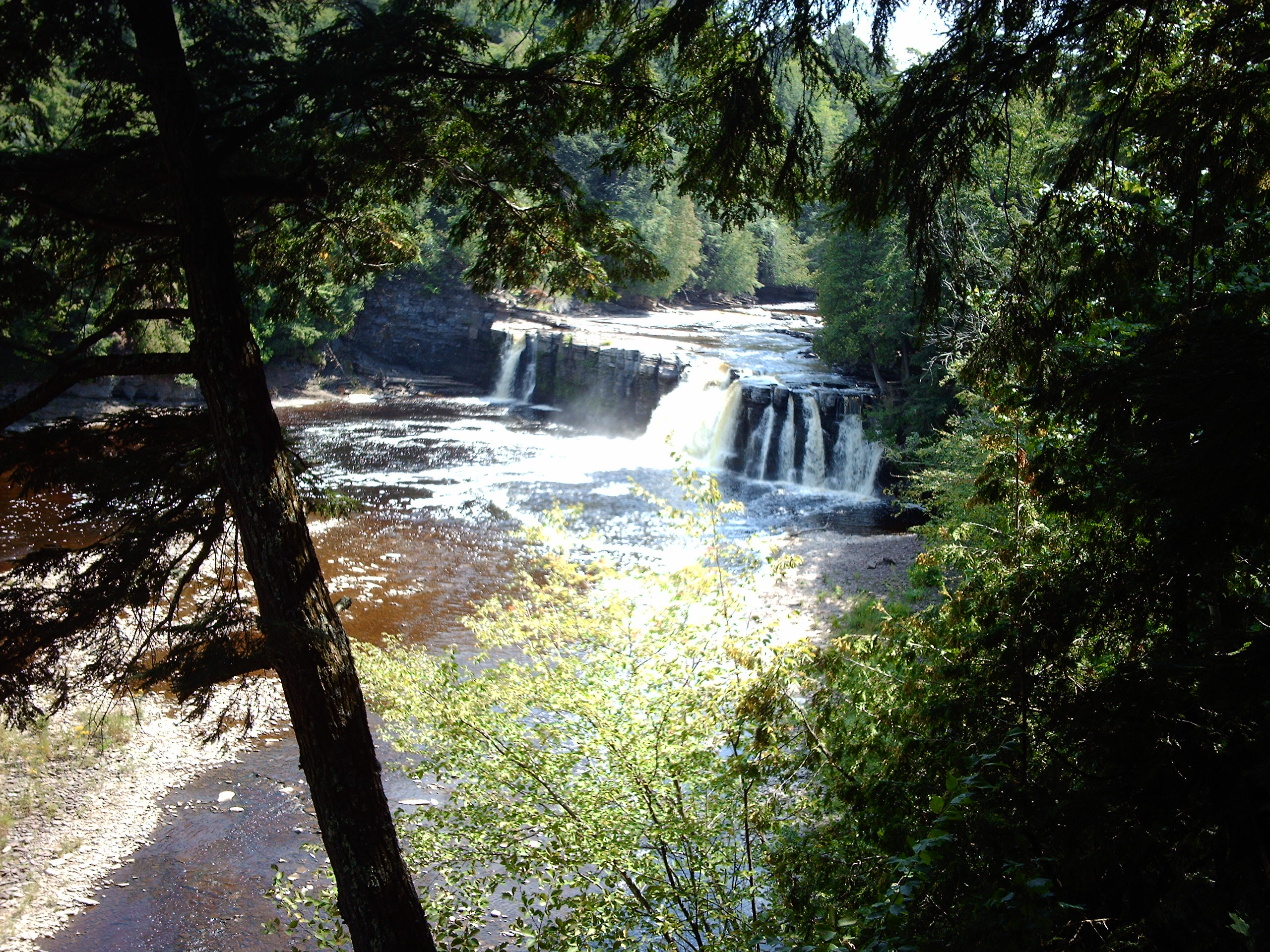
- Presque Isle River

Location
- Country: United States
- State: Michigan

National Wild and Scenic River
- Type: Scenic, Recreational
- Designated: March 3, 1992

The Presque Isle River runs 42.1 miles (67.8 km) through the Upper Peninsula of Michigan and empties into Lake Superior. Along its course, it flows through the Ottawa National Forest and Porcupine Mountains Wilderness State Park. It has 300 square miles (780 km^{2}) of drainage area in Upper Michigan and northern Wisconsin.

Several waterfalls are located on the river. They include (from west to east):

- Manabezho Falls
- Manido Falls
- Nawadaha Falls
- Iagoo Falls
- Lepisto Falls
- Nokomis Falls
- Nimikon Falls
- Minnewawa Falls
- Yondota Falls
