= Delirium Wilderness =

Protected area in Michigan, US

- IUCN category Ib (wilderness area)
- Location within Michigan Location within the United States
- Location: Chippewa County, Michigan, United States
- Nearest city: Raco, Michigan
- Coordinates: 46°18′03″N 84°41′58″W
- Area: 11,870 acres (48.0 km^{2})
- Established: 1987
- Governing body: U.S. Forest Service & Great Lakes Indian Fish & Wildlife Commission

Delirium Wilderness is a 11,870-acre (48.0 km^{2}) wilderness area in Chippewa County, within the Hiawatha National Forest in the U.S. state of Michigan.

The wilderness is forested and flat-to-rolling, with its lower reaches often characterized as a swamp. Elevations range from 590 to 890 feet (180 to 270 m). Sculpted by glaciers and an ancient glacial lake, it now contains the 80-acre (32 ha) Sylvester Pond and the 6-acre (2 ha) Delirium Pond, as well as parts of the headwaters of the Pine and Waiska Rivers.

== Vegetation ==
Delirium Wilderness is thickly forested with swamp conifer, aspen, and white cedar, with stands of red and jack pine growing in its drier areas.

== Wildlife ==
Wildlife predominant in the Delirium Wilderness includes beaver, bobcat, otter, wolf, various species of duck, loon, great blue heron, and sandhill crane. Whitetail deer, black bear, and rabbit are also found in the area.

== See also ==
- Protected areas of Michigan
- List of U.S. Wilderness Areas
- Wilderness Act
