= Round Lake (Alger and Delta Counties, Michigan) =

Lake in the state of Michigan, United States

- Location within Michigan Location within the United States
- Location: Alger and Delta counties
- Coordinates: 46°9′03″N 86°44′41″W
- Type: Lake
- Basin countries: United States
- Surface area: 475 acres (192 ha)
- Max. depth: 55 ft (17 m)
- Shore length^{1}: about 4.0 mi (6.4 km)
- Surface elevation: 781 ft (238 m)
- ^{1} Shore length is not a well-defined measure.

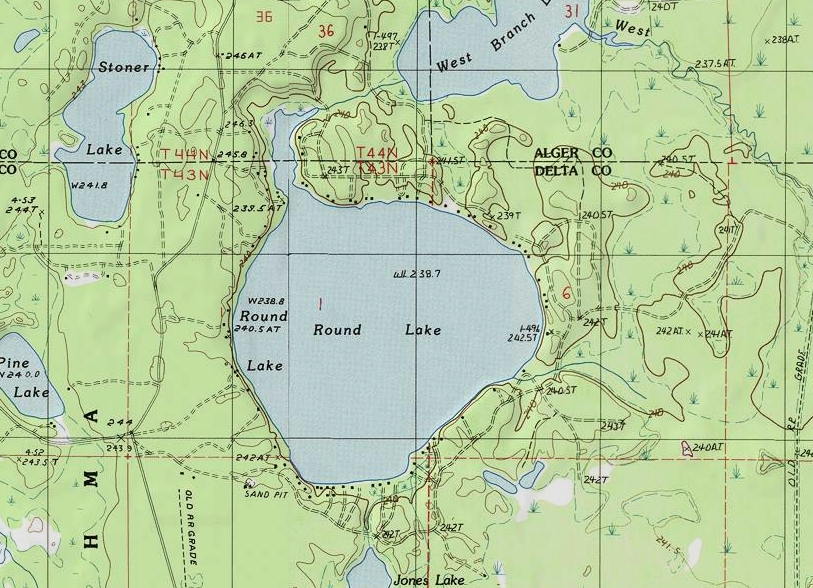
A topographic map of the area

Round Lake is a 475-acre (192 ha) lake that is located mostly in Delta County, Michigan with a little portion in Alger county in the Hiawatha National Forest. Other nearby lakes include Lake Stella, Stoner Lake, West Branch Lake, Hugaboom Lake, Blue Lake, Ironjaw Lake, Ostrander Lake, Corner-Straits Chain and Toms Lake.

== See also ==
- List of lakes in Michigan
