= Mowe Lake =

Lake in the state of Michigan, United States

- Location within Michigan
- Location: Delta County, Michigan
- Coordinates: 46°8′39.30″N 86°34′40.18″W
- Basin countries: United States
- Surface area: 24 acres (10 ha)
- Surface elevation: 791 ft (241 m)

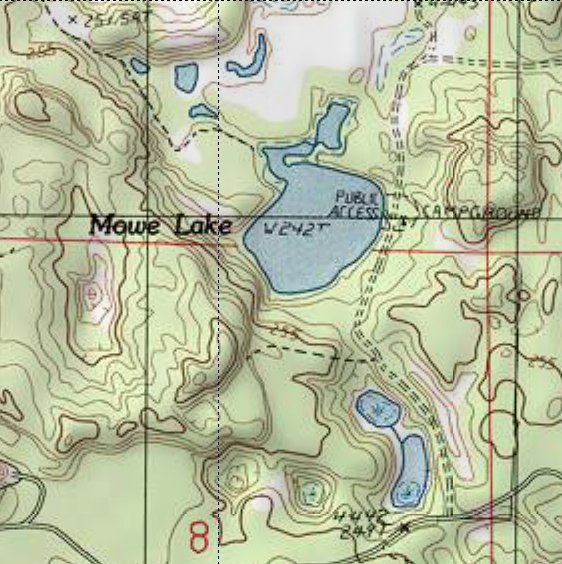
A topographic map of the Mowe Lake area

Mowe Lake is a 24-acre (10 ha) lake that is located in northern Delta County, Michigan in the Hiawatha National Forest. It is just south of the county line with Alger and Schoolcraft countries and about a half mile north of trail 2225 on trail 2692 (commonly referred to as Mowe Lake Road) passed the small ponds. There are primitive campsites and a small boat launch. Other nearby lakes include Hugaboom Lake, Blue Lake, Corner-Straits Chain of lakes, Ironjaw Lake, and Round Lake.

== See also ==
- List of lakes in Michigan
