= Carp Lake Township, Ontonagon County, Michigan =

Carp Lake Township, Michigan
- Civil township
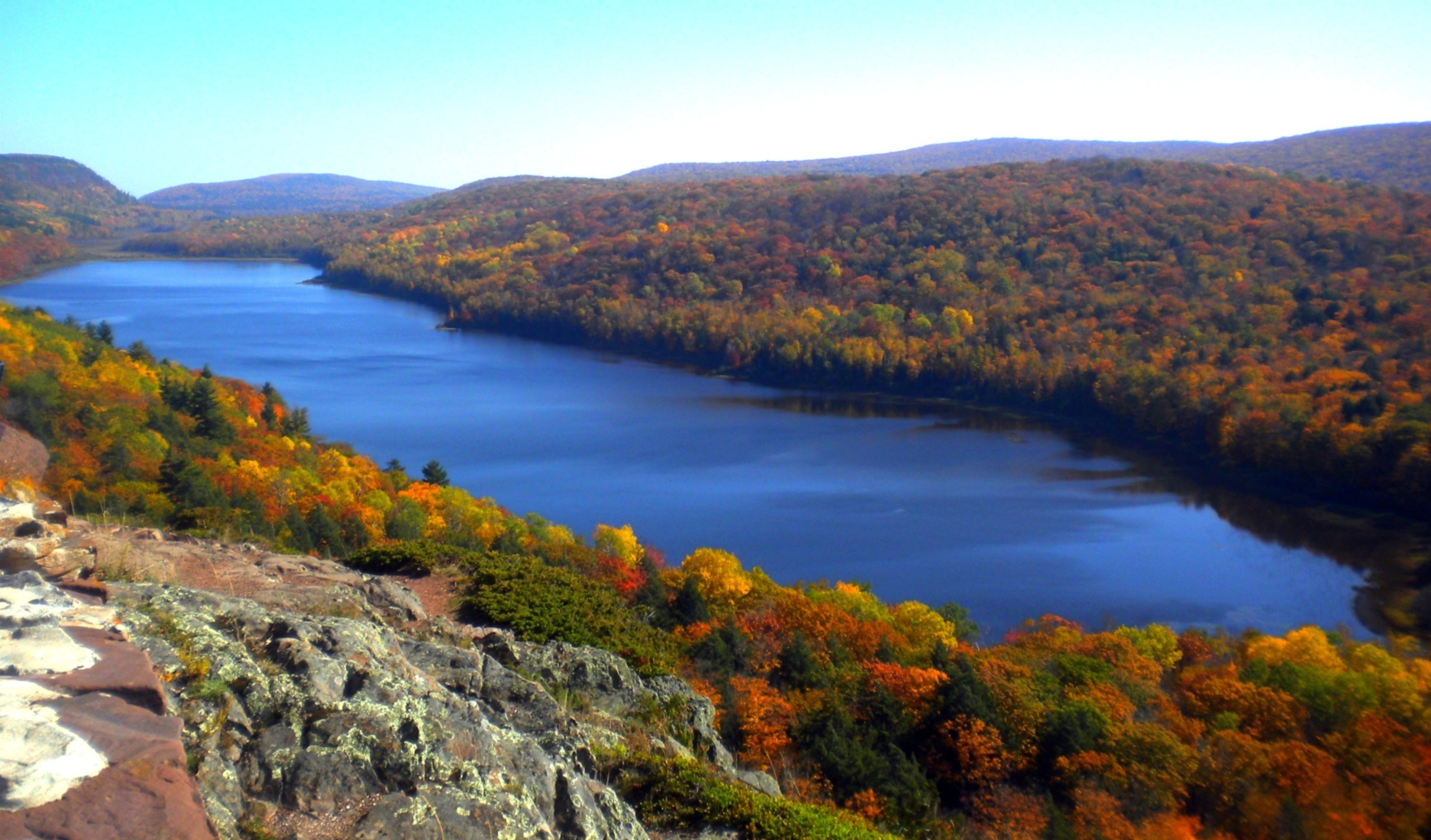
- Lake of the Clouds in Porcupine Mountains Wilderness State Park

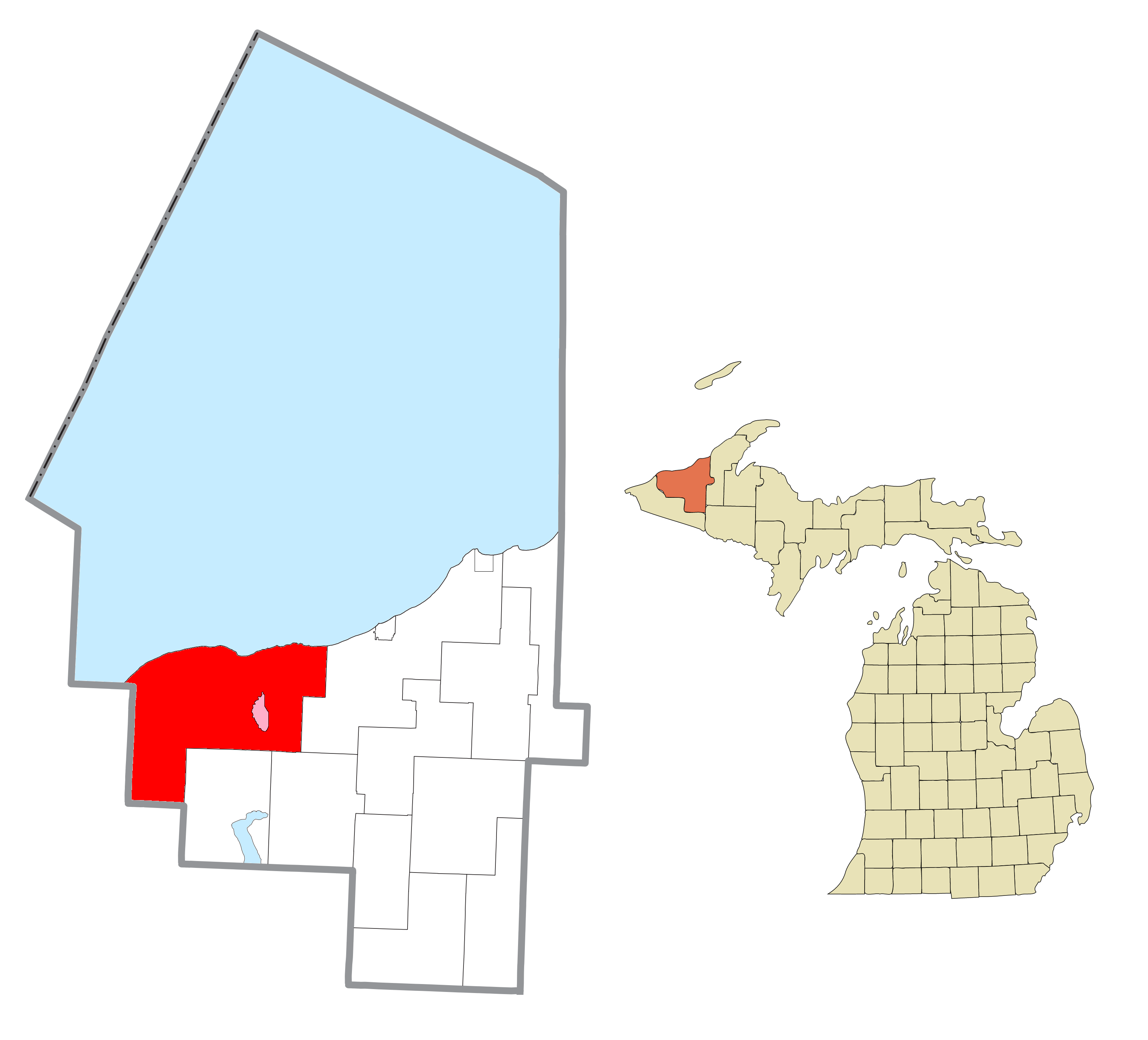
- Location within Ontonagon County (red) and the administered community of White Pine (pink)

- Location within the state of Michigan Carp Lake Township (the United States)
- Coordinates: 46°44′14″N 89°37′38″W
- Country: United States
- State: Michigan
- County: Ontonagon

Government
  - Supervisor: Homer Colclasure
  - Clerk: Nancy Reath

Area
  - Total: 225.59 sq mi (584.3 km^{2})
  - Land: 224.84 sq mi (582.3 km^{2})
  - Water: 0.75 sq mi (1.9 km^{2})
- Elevation: 1,027 ft (313 m)

Population (2020)
  - Total: 582
  - Density: 3.21/sq mi (1.24/km^{2})
- Time zone: UTC-5 (Eastern (EST))
  - Summer (DST): UTC-4 (EDT)
- ZIP code(s): 49947 (Marenisco); 49953 (Ontonagon); 49968 (Wakefield); 49971 (White Pine)
- Area code: 906
- FIPS code: 26-13520
- GNIS feature ID: 1626034
- Website: https://www.carplaketwp.org/

Carp Lake Township is a civil township of Ontonagon County in the U.S. state of Michigan. The population of the township was 582 at the 2020 census. Part of Porcupine Mountains Wilderness State Park is within the township.

Carp Lake Township is the westernmost municipality in the United States to use Eastern Standard Time.

== Geography ==
According to the United States Census Bureau, the township has a total area of 225.59 square miles (584.28 km^{2}), of which 224.84 square miles (582.33 km^{2}) is land and 0.75 square miles (1.94 km^{2}) (0.33%) is water. It is the westernmost municipality in the United States to be in the Eastern Time Zone.

The township contains a substantial shoreline on Lake Superior.

=== Communities ===
- Carp Lake began around a copper mine in 1858.
- White Pine is a census-designated place and unincorporated community in the township.
