= Rock River Canyon Wilderness =

Wilderness area in Michigan, United States

- IUCN category Ib (wilderness area)
- Location within the United States
- Location: Alger County, Michigan, United States
- Nearest city: Chatham, Michigan
- Coordinates: 46°24′08″N 86°56′44″W
- Area: 4,640 acres (18.8 km^{2})
- Established: 1987
- Governing body: U.S. Forest Service

The Rock River Canyon Wilderness is a 4,640-acre (18.8 km^{2}) unit within the Hiawatha National Forest. It is located in Alger County, Michigan. The wilderness is accessible from M-94, which runs south of the unit in a west-to-east direction. The nearest town is Chatham, Michigan, which is located approximately 3 miles (4.8 km) south of the wilderness unit's eastern end.

Like the rest of the Hiawatha Forest, the Rock River Canyon Wilderness was logged starting about 1880 and ending about 1930. The typical method of logging was to clear-cut all marketable timber and leave the discarded slashings on the forest floor. A severe forest fire was almost inevitable, followed by severe erosion and the creation of a second-growth forest that differed from the previous old-growth forest in many ways. The wilderness is now a template of natural succession that contrasts with most of the Hiawatha National Forest, which continues to be managed for harvestable pulpwood.

Today, the Rock River Canyon Wilderness is a roadless unit within the managed Hiawatha Forest. The wilderness centers on two small sandstone canyons, approximately 150 feet (46 m) deep, through which flow the Rock River and its tributary Silver Creek. Rock climbing is discouraged because the wilderness's sandstone cliffs are friable and crumbly. The wilderness also includes a 15-foot (4.6 m) waterfall, Rock River Falls, and a shallow 13-acre (53,000 m^{2}) lake, Ginpole Lake. Both waterways, the waterfall, and the lake are all part of the Lake Superior drainage basin.

Large fauna within the Rock River Canyon Wilderness includes the black bear and the whitetail deer. Fish in the Rock River and Silver Creek include the northern pike, coho salmon, brook trout, brown trout, and rainbow trout.

The Rock River Canyon Wilderness was created by Congress in 1987.
