= M-108 (Michigan highway) =

Former state highway in Emmet and Cheboygan counties in Michigan, United States

M-108
- Nicolet Street
- Former M-108 highlighted in red

Route information
- Maintained by MDOT
- Length: 1.069 mi (1.720 km)
- Existed: 1960–December 9, 2010

Major junctions
- South end: I-75 near Mackinaw City
- US 23 in Mackinaw City
- North end: Off ramp north of Michigan Tourism Welcome Center in Mackinaw City

Location
- Country: United States
- State: Michigan
- Counties: Emmet, Cheboygan

Highway system
- Michigan State Trunkline Highway System; Interstate; US; State; Byways
← M-107	→ M-109

M-108 was a state trunkline highway in the US state of Michigan. The highway followed Nicolet Street, although some maps also labeled it as Mackinaw Highway. The road was on the boundary between Emmet and Cheboygan counties.

The original M-108 designation dated back to 1928. This version was transferred to local control in 1957, but revived later under a similar routing in 1960. On April 29, 2010, the Petoskey News-Review reported that the Michigan Department of Transportation (MDOT) would rebuild the roadway in preparation to transfer it back to local control once again. MDOT and local officials signed memoranda of understanding, completing the transfer of the roadway on December 9, 2010.

== Route description ==
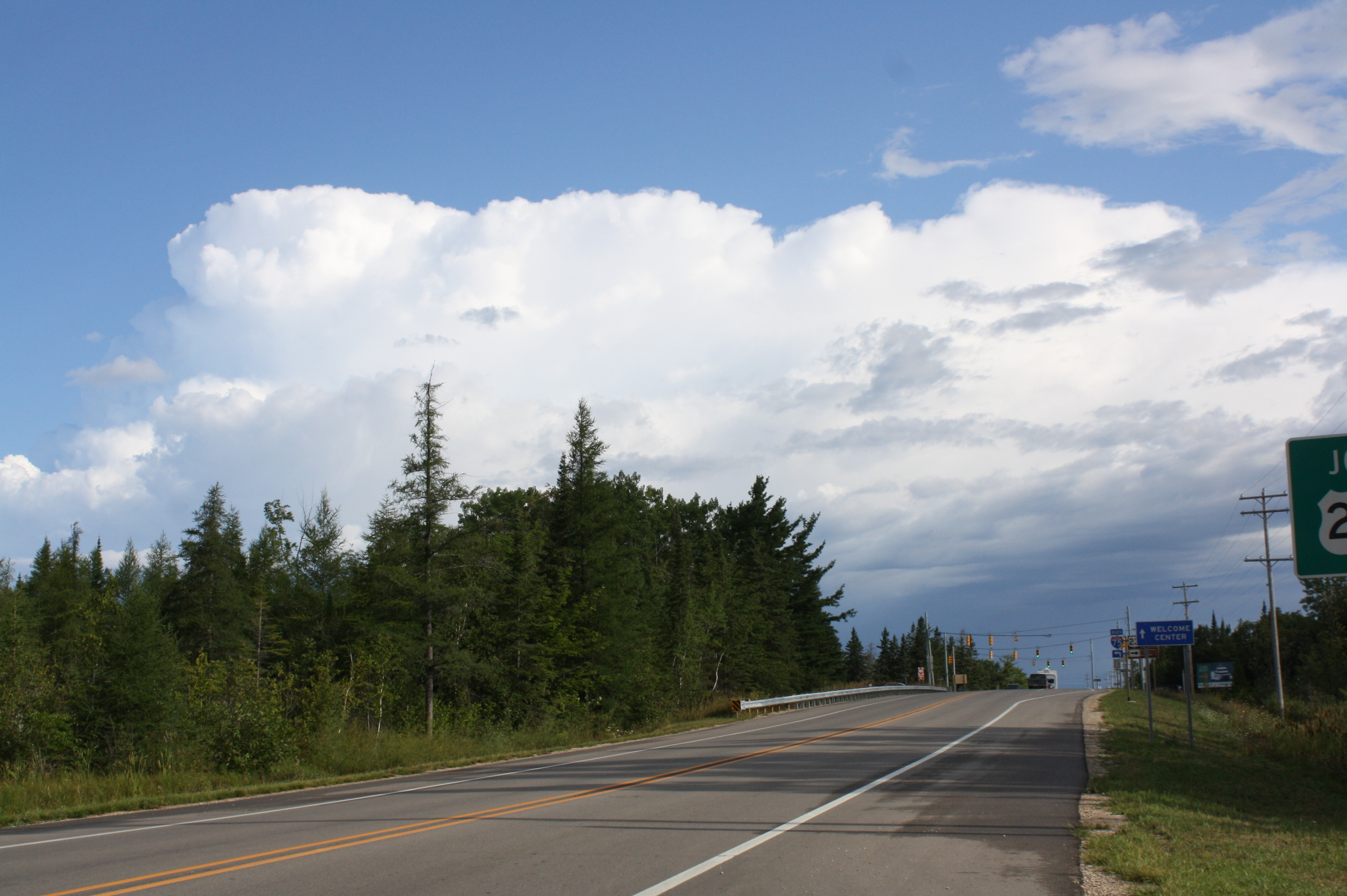
Looking north at intersection with US 23

The 1.069-mile-long (1.720 km) trunkline connected two interchanges off Interstate 75 (I-75) on the south side of Mackinaw City with a tourist welcome center. The southern terminus was at a partial interchange with I-75 (exit 337) just south of Mackinaw City on the boundary between Emmet and Cheboygan counties. This interchange is about two miles (3.2 km) north of the northern terminus of US Highway 31 (US 31). M-108 followed Nicolet Street north from I-75 into the Village of Mackinaw City past the Thunder Falls Water Park and some local motels to an intersection with US 23. North of the US 23 intersection is the Michigan Welcome Center and other tourist amenities on the west side of the street. State maintenance ended at the intersection with the off-ramp from northbound I-75 exit 338.

== History ==
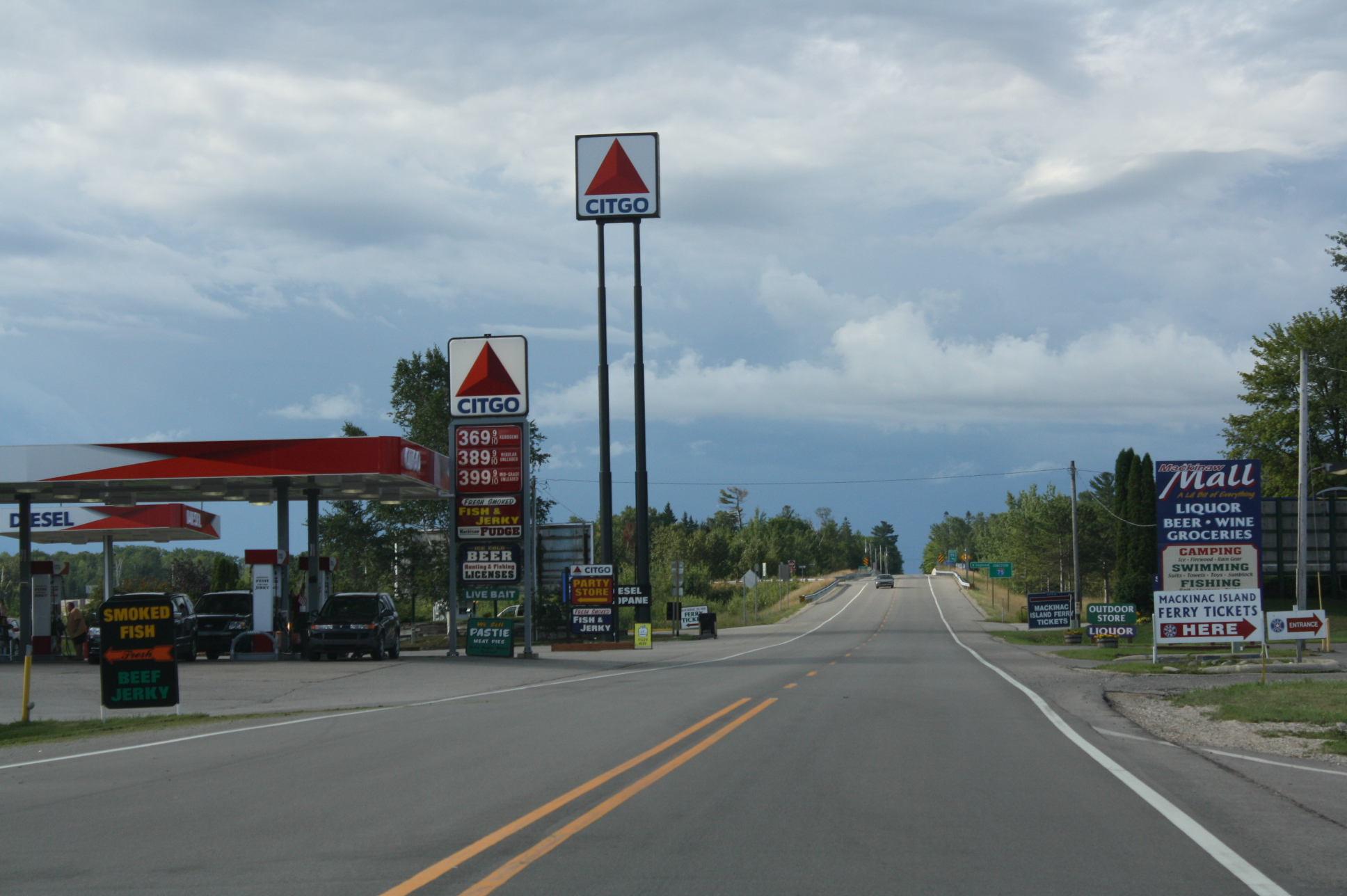
Looking south at the former southern terminus

In 1928, the first M-108 designation was commissioned along a rare three-legged route connecting the State Highway Ferry Docks with the Fort Michilimackinac State Historic Park and US 31. At one point while traveling westbound on M-108, motorists could turn right onto northbound M-108 or left onto southbound M-108. In preparation for the opening of the Mackinac Bridge, the Michigan State Highway Department transferred all of M-108 to local control in late 1957, decommissioning the designation at the same time. In 1960, the current M-108 was commissioned along the final routing.

On April 29, 2010, MDOT announced plans to transfer M-108 in its entirety to the Village of Mackinaw City and Emmet County. In preparation for this transfer, MDOT repaved, widened and reconstructed the roadway. While rebuilding the section of the highway between US 23 and the northern terminus, the welcome center was closed. Plans had this section to be completed, and the center to be reopened, for Memorial Day weekend, with the remainder of construction to be completed in August. Following the transfer to local control, M-108 ceased to be a state highway and the designation was decommissioned. Previous news reports stated that the roadway was too small to merit highway status under federal guidelines. The transfer was completed on December 9, 2010, when MDOT and local officials signed memoranda of understanding to finalize the transfer. The section within the Village of Mackinaw City was transferred to the village, and the remainder to Emmet County.

== Major intersections ==
The entire highway was on the Emmet–Cheboygan county line.

Location	mi	km	Destinations	Notes
Wawatam–Mackinaw township line	0.000	0.000	I-75 south / LMCT – Saginaw To US 31 south	Northbound exit and southbound entrance only on I-75; exit 337 on I-75; roadway continues south as Old US 31/Mackinaw Highway
Mackinaw City	0.613	0.987	US 23 / LHCT – Cheboygan, Mackinac Bridge	
Mackinaw City	0.784	1.262	Michigan Tourism Welcome Center	
Mackinaw City	1.069	1.720	Exit ramp from I-75	Former end of state maintenance; street continues north as Nicolet Street; no access to I-75 from M-108
1.000 mi = 1.609 km; 1.000 km = 0.621 mi: Incomplete access
