= Sturgeon River (Delta County, Michigan) =

River in Michigan, United States

Location
- Country: United States

Physical characteristics
- Source
  - location: Au Train Township, Alger County, Michigan
- Mouth
  - location: Big Bay de Noc in Nahma Township, Delta County, Michigan
  - elevation: 581 feet (177 m)

National Wild and Scenic River
- Type: Scenic, Recreational
- Designated: March 3, 1992

Sturgeon River is a 63.6-mile-long (102.4 km) river in the U.S. state of Michigan, flowing mostly southward through Alger County and Delta County counties in the Upper Peninsula.

The Sturgeon River rises as the outflow of Sixteenmile Lake in Alger County at 46°17′35″N 86°46′00″W and flows primarily southward into Big Bay de Noc of Lake Michigan at 45°50′17″N 86°40′01″W.

The West Branch Sturgeon River rises at 46°09′56″N 86°43′46″W and flows southeast 12.5 miles (20.1 km) into the main stream at 46°08′43″N 86°41′14″W.

A post office named Sturgeon River opened near the mouth of the river on July 23, 1891. The name was changed to St. Jacques on June 22, 1904. It closed on November 30, 1913, re-opened April 11, 1919, and was discontinued on July 31, 1955.

== Tributaries ==
(from the mouth)

- (right) Bull Run
  - Moss Lake
    - Germaine Creek
- (left) Morman Creek
- (left) Moses Creek
- (right) Eighteenmile Creek
  - (left) Johnson Creek
    - Kenobo Lake
  - (right) Mink Creek
    - Cache Lake
  - (right) Chicago Lake
  - Vista Lake
  - Back Lake
- (left) Little Black Creek
- (left) Black Creek
- (left) West Branch Sturgeon River
  - West Branch Lake
  - Round Lake
  - Lake Stella
- (right) Camp R Creek
- Dam Lake
  - (left) Little Aleck Lake
  - (right) Wheelbarrow Lake
    - Lake Twenty Five
  - (left) Little Round Lake
  - Sixteenmile Lake
