= Big Island Lake (California) =

- Location within California Location within the United States
- Location: Yosemite National Park, Tuolumne County, California
- Coordinates: 38.091°N 119.700°W
- Type: Lake
- Surface elevation: 8,983 feet (2,738 m)

Big Island Lake is a lake in Yosemite National Park, United States.

Big Island Lake was named from the large lake island it contains.

== See also ==
- List of lakes in California
