= Lake of the Clouds =

Lake in Michigan, United States

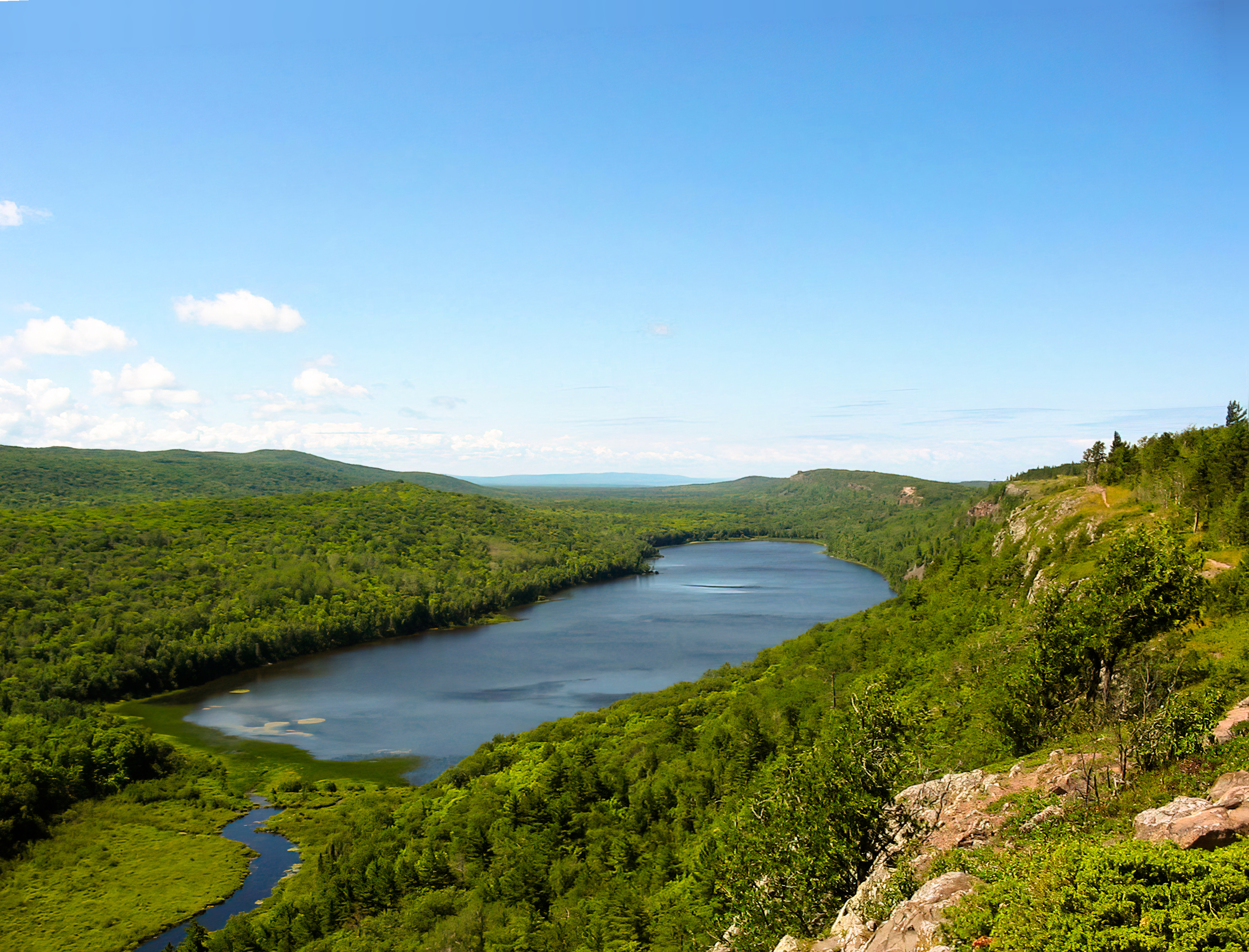

- Location within Michigan
- Location: Ontonagon County, Michigan
- Coordinates: 46°48′14″N 89°45′08″W
- Primary inflows: Carp River Inlet
- Primary outflows: Carp River
- Basin countries: United States
- Surface area: 133 acres (0.5 km^{2})
- Surface elevation: 1,076 ft (328 m)

Lake of the Clouds is a lake located in Ontonagon County in the Upper Peninsula of the U.S. state of Michigan within the Porcupine Mountains Wilderness State Park. The lake is situated in a valley between two ridges in the Porcupine Mountains. Surrounded by virgin wilderness and stunning vistas, the lake is a popular destination for hikers, campers, and fishermen.

The lake is a prominent feature of the park, and can be viewed at the Lake of the Clouds Overlook at the west terminus of the former Michigan highway M-107. The state park occasionally hosts a nighttime sky watch at the lake. The lake is fed from the east end by the Carp River Inlet and the outflow from the western end is the Carp River, which empties into Lake Superior on the boundary between Ontonagon and Gogebic County.

== See also ==
- List of lakes in Michigan
