= Big Island Lake Wilderness =

Protected area in Michigan, US

- IUCN category Ib (wilderness area)
- Location within Michigan Location within the United States
- Location: Schoolcraft County, Michigan, United States
- Nearest city: Steuben, Michigan
- Coordinates: 46°13′13″N 86°30′35″W
- Area: 5,856 acres (2,370 ha)
- Governing body: U.S. Forest Service

Big Island Lake Wilderness is a 5,856-acre (2,370 ha) remote protected area in the Munising Ranger District of the Hiawatha National Forest in the Upper Peninsula in the state of Michigan in the United States. The wilderness area is located about one-half mile (0.8 km) northwest of the community of Steuben and 22 miles (35 km) northwest of Manistique and about 18 miles (29 km) southeast of Munising in Schoolcraft County. The area is roughly bordered by County Road 437 on the south and County Road 445 on the west. The northeast boundary is Forest Road 2303 and the southern boundary is the abandoned railroad grade—Haywire Grade - Forest Road 8109.

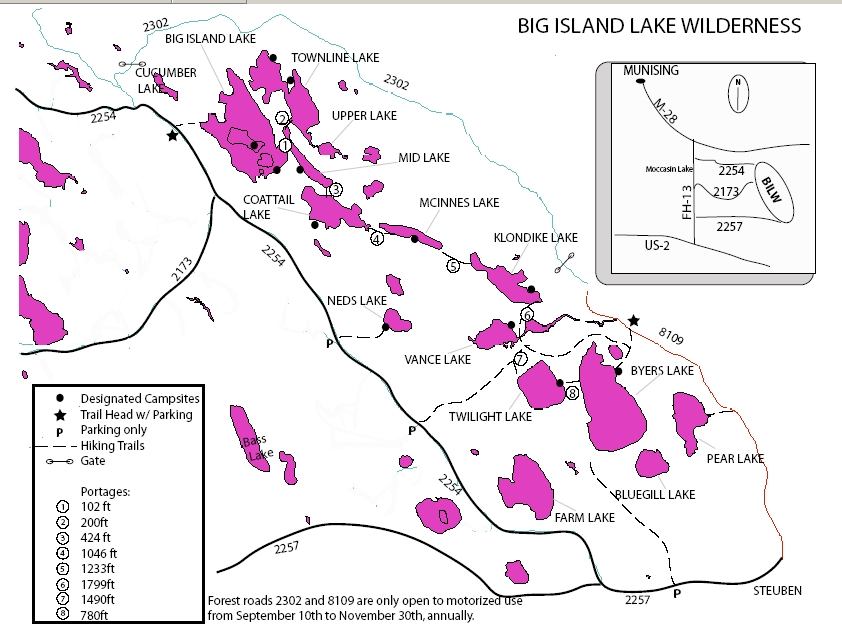
U.S. Forest Service map
