= Blue Lake (Michigan) =

Lake in the state of Michigan, United States

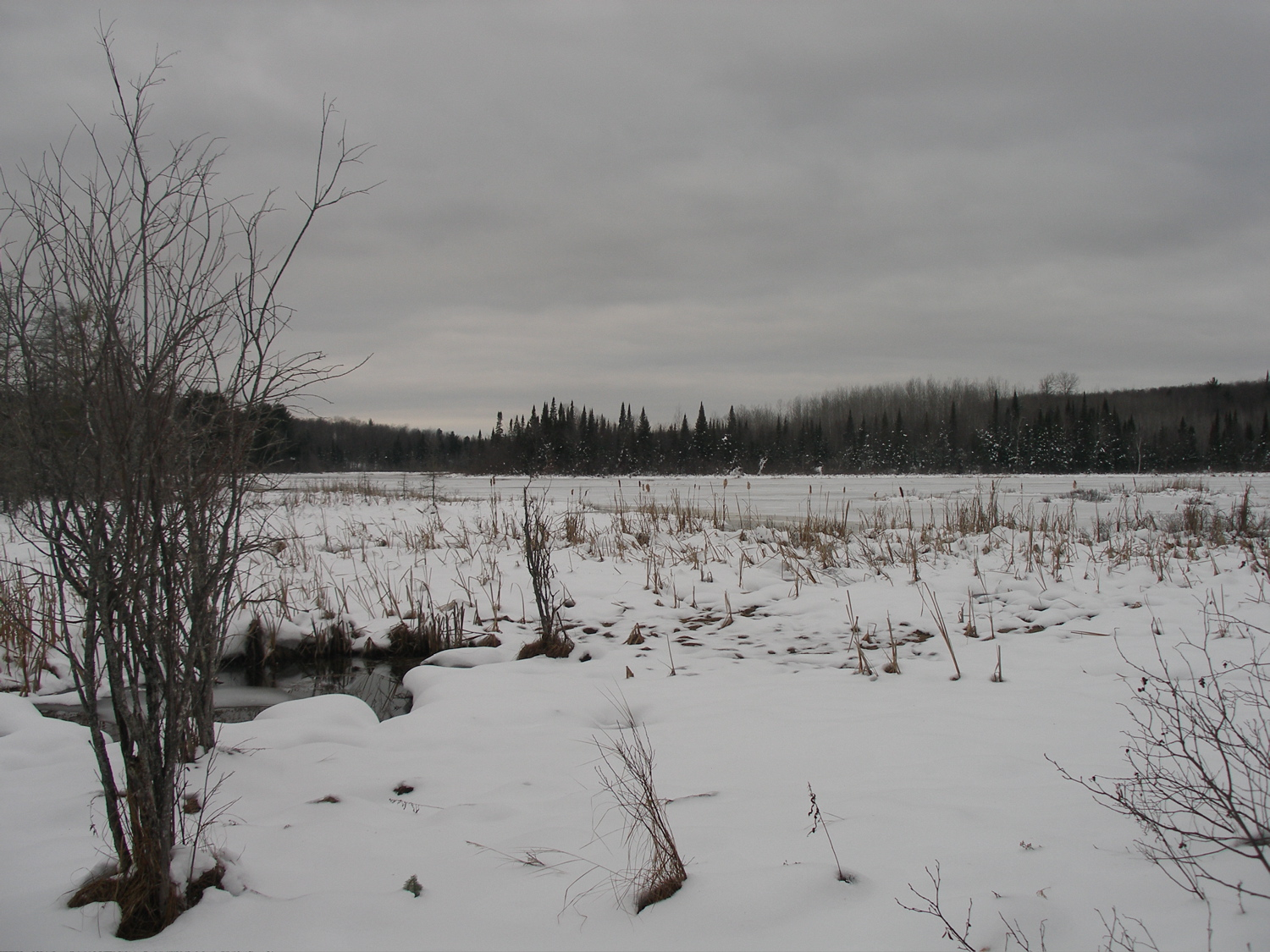
- Blue Lake in November 2008

- Location within the state of Michigan
- Location: Alger County, Michigan
- Coordinates: 46°9′59.76″N 86°37′55.56″W
- Basin countries: United States
- Surface area: 31 acres (13 ha)
- Surface elevation: 761 ft (232 m)
- Settlements: Munising Township

Blue Lake is a 31-acre (13 ha) lake with a marshy shoreline that is located in southern Alger County, Michigan in the middle of the Hiawatha National Forest. It is located about a mile north of the intersection of Federal Forest Highway 13 and Delta County Road 440 and just north of the county line with Delta County and just west of the county line with Schoolcraft County. The only lodging on the lake and for several miles are the cabins of the Hiawatha Resort situated near the Midway General Store.

Some of the wildlife living near the lake include beaver, otter, mink, sandhill cranes, muskrat, geese, herons, and ducks. The national forest offers many game animals including black bear, white-tailed deer, woodcock, and grouse. Other nearby lakes include Hugaboom Lake, Mowe Lake, Corner-Straits Chain of lakes, Ironjaw Lake, and Round Lake.

== See also ==
- List of lakes in Michigan
