= Corner-Straits Chain of lakes =

Chain of lakes in Michigan, United States

- Location within Michigan Location within the United States

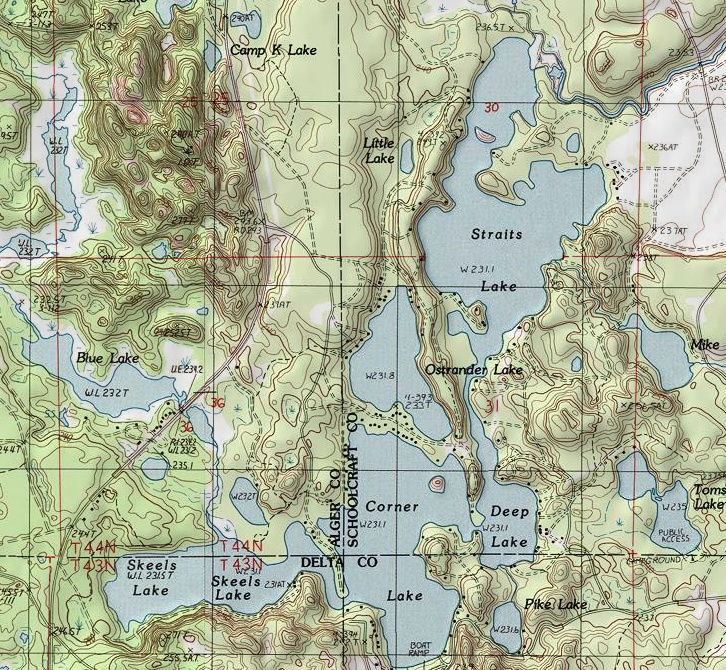
- A topographic map of the Corner-Straits chain area
- Location: Alger, Schoolcraft, and Delta counties
- Coordinates: 46°9′9.33″N 86°37′01″W
- Basin countries: United States
- Surface area: 477 acres (193 ha)
- Surface elevation: 846 ft (258 m)

Corner-Straits chain of lakes is a 477 acres (1.93 km^{2}) chain of lakes that is located at the tri-county corner of Delta County, Michigan, Alger and Schoolcraft countries in the Hiawatha National Forest. The chain consists of Skeels Lake, Corner Lake, Deep Lake, and Straits Lake. Other nearby lakes include Hugaboom Lake, Blue Lake, Ironjaw Lake, Ostrander Lake, Toms Lake and Round Lake.

== See also ==
- List of lakes in Michigan
