= Hugaboom Lake =

Lake in the state of Michigan, United States

- Location within Michigan
- Location: Delta County, Michigan
- Coordinates: 46°9′2.15″N 86°36′28.0″W
- Basin countries: United States
- Surface area: 31 acres (13 ha)
- Surface elevation: 849 ft (259 m)

Hugaboom Lake is a 31-acre (13 ha) lake that is located in northern Delta County, Michigan in the Hiawatha National Forest. It is just south of the county line with Alger and Schoolcraft countries and about a mile and half east of the intersection of Federal Forest Highway 13 and County Road 440. Other nearby lakes include Mowe Lake, Corner-Straits Chain of lakes, Ironjaw Lake, and Round Lake.

== See also ==
- List of lakes in Michigan
