= Porcupine Mountains =

Park in Michigan, US

Porcupine Mountains Wilderness State Park
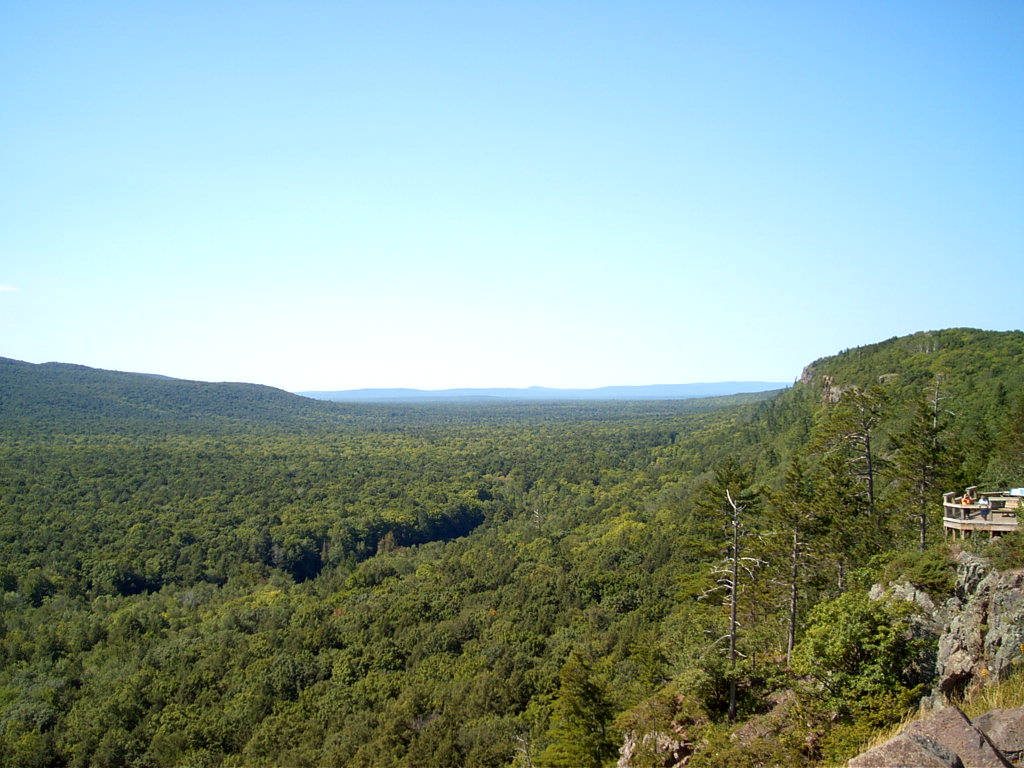
- A vista in the Porcupine Mountains

- Location within Michigan Location within the United States
- Location: Ontonagon and Gogebic counties, Michigan, United States
- Nearest town: Ontonagon, Michigan
- Coordinates: 46°45′15″N 89°47′24″W
- Area: 59,020 acres (23,880 ha)
- Elevation: 1,539 feet (469 m)
- Established: 1944
- Administrator: Michigan Department of Natural Resources
- Designation: Michigan state park
- Website: Official website

U.S. National Natural Landmark
- Designated: 1984

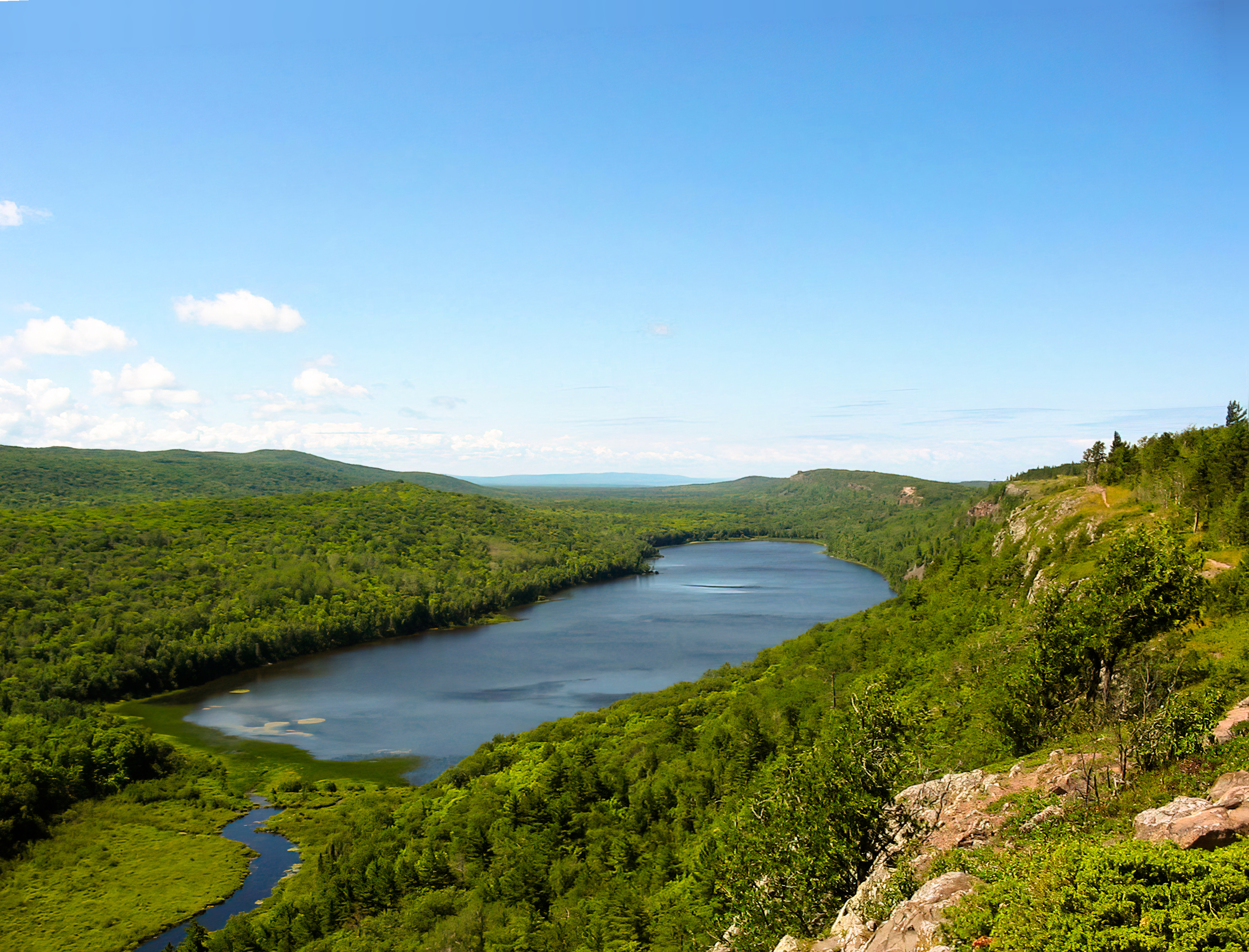
Lake of the Clouds.

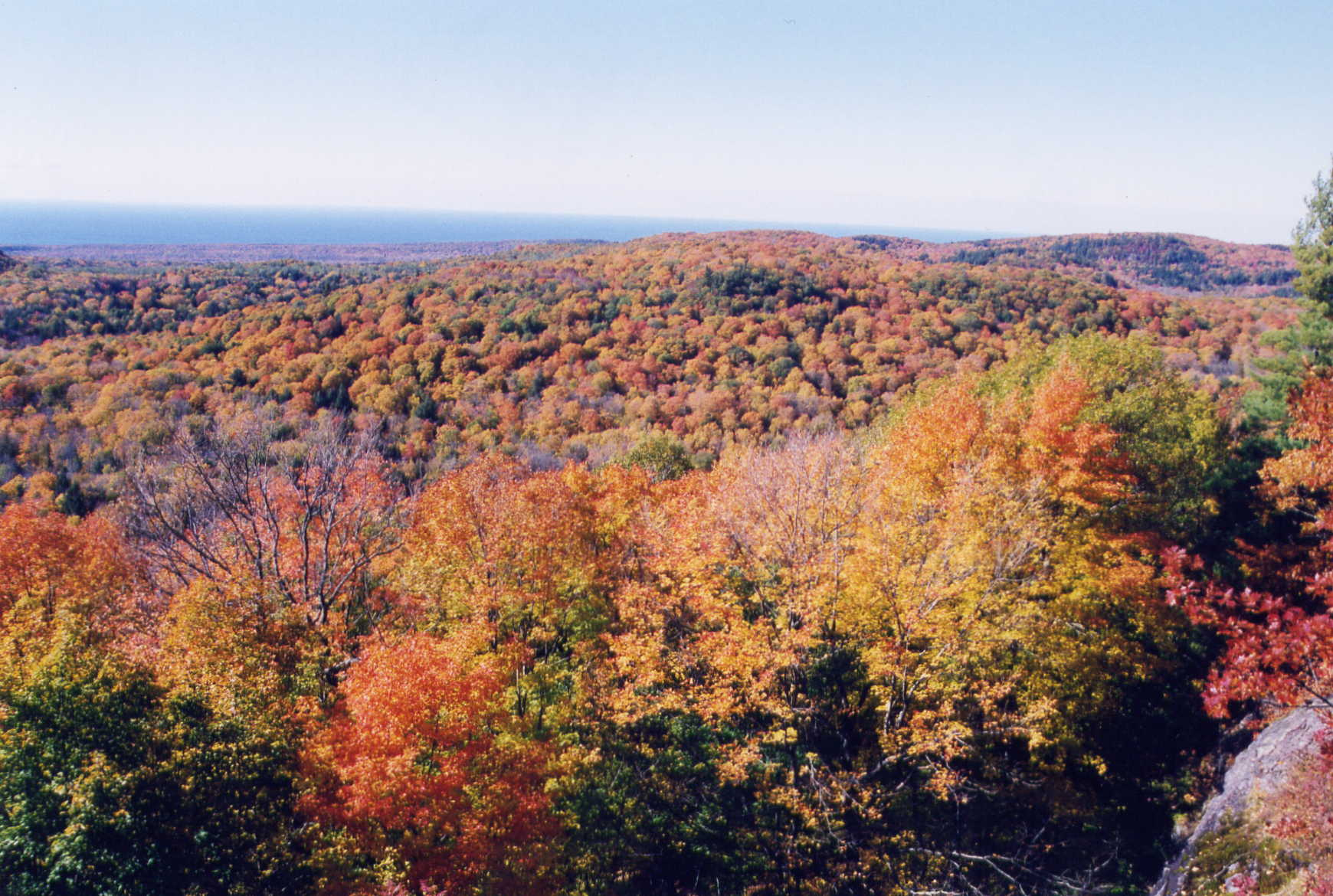
Autumn color and Lake Superior.

The Porcupine Mountains, or Porkies, are a group of small mountains spanning the northwestern Upper Peninsula of Michigan in Ontonagon and Gogebic counties, near the shore of Lake Superior. The Porcupine Mountains were named by the native Ojibwa people, supposedly because their silhouette had the shape of a crouching porcupine. They are home to the most extensive stand of old growth northern hardwood forest in North America west of the Adirondack Mountains, spanning at least 31,000 acres (13,000 ha). The area is popular among tourists, especially Lake of the Clouds in the heart of the mountains, and is part of Porcupine Mountains Wilderness State Park.

The Porcupine Mountains were the site of copper mining in the 19th century. One of these mines is the Nonesuch Mine, which operated sporadically from 1867 to 1912. Because of its copper mining history, the state park is a cooperating unit of Keweenaw National Historical Park.

In August 2026, Highland Copper, a Canadian mining company, received $50 million in funding from the Michigan Strategic Fund to construct a copper mine adjacent to the Porcupine Mountains. This project has received criticism over potential environmental harms to the Porcupine Mountains. Conversely, there is support for the potential economic benefits for Gogebic County.

== Geology ==
The most striking geological feature of the Porcupine Mountains is the long basalt and conglomerate escarpment parallel to the Lake Superior shore and overlooking Lake of the Clouds, a continuation of the same copper-bearing bedrock found farther northeast on the Keweenaw Peninsula. A second ridge farther inland, on the other side of Lake of the Clouds, includes Summit Peak, the highest point in the mountains at 1,958 feet (595 m). Rivers, waterfalls, swamps, and lakes lie between the rocky outcroppings. There are a number of waterfalls on the Presque Isle River in the extreme western side of the park. The mountains are the remnants of an old stratovolcano and, at 2 billion years old, form part of one of the oldest mountain chains in the world.

== Meteorology ==
The mountains are subject to heavy lake-effect snow from Lake Superior. The relatively high elevation of the mountains and their proximity to the lake provide perfect conditions for lake-effect snow, but no official records are maintained anywhere in the mountains. The closest National Weather Service station is in the coastal community of Ontonagon, where the annual average is about 200 inches (510 cm). Totals of well over 250 inches (640 cm) annually are likely in the higher elevations. It is not uncommon to have 300-inch (760 cm) seasons in this region.

== Flora and fauna ==
The Porkies are the location of a large stand of old growth forest. In these virgin forests, sugar maple, American basswood, eastern hemlock, and yellow birch are the most abundant tree species.

Area fauna includes moose, gray wolves, white-tailed deer, coyotes, gray and red foxes, cougar, river otters, beaver, fisher, marten, mink, bobcats, lynx, black bears, and porcupines.

Endangered, threatened and special concern species found in the Porkies include small blue-eyed mary, ram's head ladyslipper, Hooker's fairy-bells, slender cliff brake, male fern, gray wolf, wood turtle, peregrine falcon, merlin, and bald eagle.

== State park ==
Porcupine Mountains State Park was established in 1945 to protect the area's large stand of old-growth forest, much of it of the "maple-hemlock" type. In 1972, Michigan passed the Wilderness and Natural Areas Act. This act gave the park the new designation of the Porcupine Mountains Wilderness State Park. Facilities provided by the park include an extensive network of backcountry trails for hiking and wilderness backpacking, rustic trailside cabins, modern campgrounds, swimming and boating areas, and various interpretive programs led by park rangers. The North Country Trail passes through the park, making up a portion of the 87 miles (140 km) of hiking trails. The Porcupine Mountains Ski Area, managed by the Gogebic Community College Ski Area Management Program, operates within the park in winter.
