= Hiawatha National Forest =

National forest in Michigan, United States

- IUCN category VI (protected area with sustainable use of natural resources)
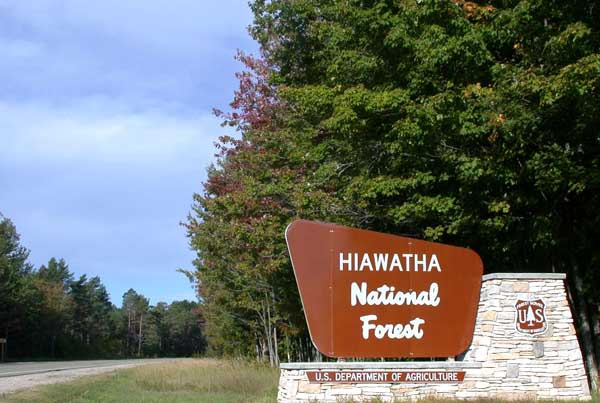
- Road sign of the Hiawatha National Forest in Alger County

- Location within the United States Location within Michigan
- Location: Upper Peninsula of Michigan, United States
- Nearest city: Escanaba, Michigan
- Coordinates: 46°08′N 86°40′W
- Area: 894,836 acres (3,621.27 km^{2})
- Established: January 16, 1931
- Governing body: U.S. Forest Service
- Website: Hiawatha National Forest

Map showing National Forests in Michigan

Hiawatha National Forest is a 894,836-acre (362,127 ha) National Forest in the Upper Peninsula of the state of Michigan in the United States. Commercial logging is conducted in some areas. The United States Forest Service administers this National Forest; it is physically divided into two subunits, commonly called the Eastside 46°14′N 84°50′W and Westside 46°08′N 86°40′W.

== Etymology ==
According to the forest service, it was "named after the Mohawk chief, Hiawatha, who brought about the confederation known as the Five Nations of the Haudenosaunee. He was also the hero of Longfellow's poem, 'Hiawatha'."

== Geography ==
In descending order of land area it lies in parts of Chippewa, Delta, Mackinac, Alger, Schoolcraft, and Marquette counties. Chippewa and Mackinac counties are in the East Unit, whereas the rest are in the West Unit. The smaller East Unit contains about 44% of the forest's area, whereas the larger West Unit has about 56%. Forest headquarters are located in Gladstone, Michigan. East Unit ranger district offices are located in Sault Ste. Marie and St. Ignace, while West Unit offices are in Manistique, Munising, and Rapid River.

The East Unit was a large infertile sandy area that was never homesteaded or developed. It was designated Marquette National Forest by President Theodore Roosevelt in 1909. This land was administered with Huron National Forest as the Michigan National Forest from 1918 until 1962, when it was transferred to Hiawatha. The forest was authorized to buy an additional 307,000 acres (124,200 ha) in 1925 and 50,000 acres (20,230 ha) in 1935. The government began purchasing land for the West Unit in 1928, this land and was designated Hiawatha National Forest in 1931. This unit was extensively replanted by the Civilian Conservation Corps.

The Hiawatha National Forest contains six designated wilderness areas:

- Big Island Lake Wilderness
- Delirium Wilderness
- Horseshoe Bay Wilderness
- Mackinac Wilderness
- Rock River Canyon Wilderness
- Round Island Wilderness

There are five National Wild and Scenic Rivers in the Forest: Carp River, Indian River, Sturgeon River, Tahquamenon River (East Branch), Whitefish River.

== Ecology ==
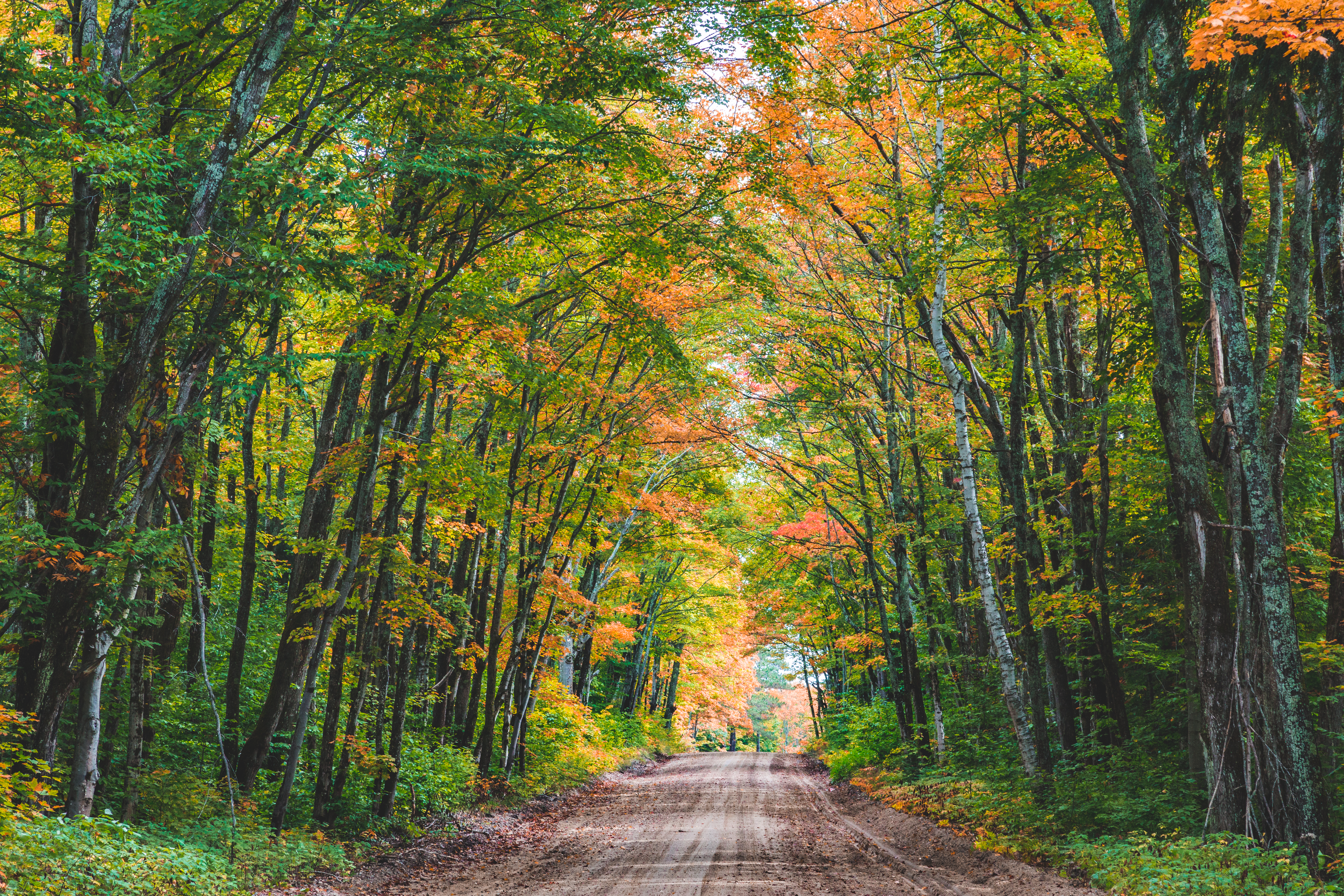
Sugar maple-paper birch plant communities in the northern portion of the national forest

Many wildlife species roam in this forest including Great Lakes wolves, white-tailed deer, golden eagles, black bears, moose, coyotes, bobcats, bald eagles, beavers, red foxes, river otters, Canadian lynxes, hawks, muskrats, weasels, sandhill cranes, minks, cougars, and wild turkeys.

The forest has over 100 miles (160 km) of shoreline. Both units have shoreline on both Lake Superior and Lake Michigan; the east unit also has shoreline on Lake Huron and includes Round Island and its lighthouse. The West Unit borders Pictured Rocks National Lakeshore, which is administered by the National Park Service, and the Grand Island National Recreation Area, which is separately administered by the U.S. Forest Service.

== Activities ==
Several lighthouses are located along the shores. The Point Iroquois Light is operated as a museum.

=== Hiking ===
A section of the 4,600-mile-long (7,400 km) North Country Trail passes through the forest.

=== Camping ===
Hiawatha National Forest has many popular areas for camping tourism. Some of the campgrounds include the following:

- AuTrain
- Bay Furnace
- Bay View, a 24-campsite campground located near Brimley on Lake Superior. It offers a secluded beach that many visitors enjoy.
- Brevoort Lake
- Camp 7 Lake
- Carp River, 44 campsites located near the Mackinac Bridge; fishing is possible here.
- Collwell Lake
- Corner Lake
- Flowing Well
- Indian River
- Island Lake
- Lake Michigan: 35 campsites on Lake Michigan located near the Mackinaw Bridge
- Little Bass Lake
- Little Bay De Noc
- Monocle Lake Campground, a 39-site campground located near Brimley near Lake Superior; it is a popular destination for RV camping.
- Petes Lake Campground
- Soldiers Lake Recreation Area
- Three Lakes Campground
- Widewaters Campground

== See also ==
- List of national forests of the United States
