= List of lakes of Michigan =

Michigan's 20 largest inland lakes.

This is a list of lakes in Michigan. The American state of Michigan borders four of the five Great Lakes.

The number of inland lakes in Michigan depends on the minimum size. There are:

- 62,798 lakes ≥ 0.1 acres (0.00040 km^{2})
- 26,266 lakes ≥ 1.0 acre (0.0040 km^{2})
- 6,537 lakes ≥ 10.0 acres (0.040 km^{2})
- 1,148 lakes ≥ 100 acres (0.40 km^{2})
- 98 lakes ≥ 1,000 acres (4.0 km^{2})
- 10 lakes ≥ 10,000 acres (40 km^{2})

Many lakes share names; some of the most common are Clear Lake, Indian Lake, Long Lake, Mud Lake, Round Lake and Silver Lake. Swimming, fishing, and/or boating are permitted in some of these lakes, but not all.

Lake	Surface area	Maximum depth	County	GNIS ID
Lake Minnewauken	145	20 feet (6.0 m)	St. Joseph County	
Ackerson Lake	187 acres (76 ha)		Jackson County	619801
Alcona Dam Pond	975 acres (395 ha)	40 feet (12 m)	Alcona County	1619004
Aginaw Lake	100 acres (40 ha)		Shiawassee County	619867
Algonquin Lake	182 acres (74 ha)		Barry County	619953
Lake Allegan	1,695 acres (686 ha)	15 feet (4.6 m)	Allegan County	619964
Allen Lake	78 acres (32 ha)	40 feet (12 m)	Gogebic County	1619009
Lake Ann	501 acres (203 ha)	75 feet (23 m)	Benzie County	620136
Lake Antoine	726 acres (294 ha)	25 feet (7.6 m)	Dickinson County	620153
Arbutus Lake	378 acres (153 ha)	44 feet (13 m)	Grand Traverse County	620194
Arcadia Lake	275 acres (111 ha)	28 feet (8.5 m)	Manistee County	620197
Arnold Lake	121 acres (49 ha)		Clare County	620241
Au Sable Lake	271 acres (110 ha)	52 feet (16 m)	Ogemaw County	1619051
Au Train Lake	845 acres (342 ha)		Alger County	1619058
Austin Lake	1,050 acres (420 ha)	11 feet (3.4 m)	Kalamazoo County	620362
Avalon Lake	372 acres (151 ha)		Montmorency County	620372
Badwater Lake	275 acres (111 ha)		Dickinson County	620432
Bacon Lake	2 acres (0.81 ha)		Shiawassee County	620419
Baileys Lake	130 acres (53 ha)		Chippewa County	620462
Bair Lake	216 acres (87 ha)		Cass County	
Baldwins Lake	262 acres (106 ha)		Cass County	620518
Lake Bancroft	21 acres (8.5 ha)		Marquette County	620542
Bankson Lake	217 acres (88 ha)	42 feet (13 m)	Van Buren County	620559
South Bar Lake	69 acres (28 ha)	13 feet (4.0 m)	Leelanau County	638260
Barlow Lake	181 acres (73 ha)		Barry County	620610
Barron Lake	216 acres (87 ha)		Cass County	620645
Baseline Lake	187 acres (76 ha)	45 feet (14 m)	Allegan County	
Bass Lake	144 acres (58 ha)		Antrim County	620706
Bass Lake	270 acres (110 ha)		Chippewa County	620710
Bass Lake	200 acres (81 ha)		Gogebic County	1619102
Bass Lake	343 acres (139 ha)	23 feet (7.0 m)	Grand Traverse County	620702
Bass Lake	101 acres (41 ha)		Iron County	
Batteese Lake	107 acres (43 ha)		Jackson County	620752
Baw Beese Lake	448 acres (181 ha)		Hillsdale County	620773
Big Bateau Lake	236 acres (96 ha)		Gogebic County	1582541
Bay Lake	173 acres (70 ha)	45 feet (14 m)	Gogebic County	1619116
East Bay Lake	277 acres (112 ha)		Gogebic County	1619795
West Bay Lake	362 acres (146 ha)		Gogebic County	1580745
Beadle Lake	134 acres (54 ha)		Calhoun County	620810
Beaufort Lake	467 acres (189 ha)		Baraga County	620895
Bear Lake	114 acres (46 ha)		Calhoun County	620850
Bear Lake	105 acres (42 ha)		Hillsdale County	620848
Bear Lake	313 acres (127 ha)		Kalkaska County	620859
Bear Lake	1,873 acres (758 ha)		Manistee County	620856
Bear Lake	425 acres (172 ha)		Muskegon County	
Beatons Lake	324 acres (131 ha)		Gogebic County	1619135
Beaver Lake	783 acres (317 ha)		Alger County	620940
Beaver Lake	693 acres (280 ha)		Alpena County	620935
Lake Bella Vista	204 acres (83 ha)		Kent County	627187
Lake Bellaire	1,789 acres (724 ha)	95 feet (29 m)	Antrim County	621049
Belleville Lake	1,775 acres (718 ha)		Wayne County	621060
Bellew Lake	66 acres (27 ha)		Grand Traverse County	
Ben-way Lake	127 acres (51 ha)	42 feet (13 m)	Antrim County	621081
Betsie Ann Lake	289 acres (117 ha)		Benzie County	
Betsy Lake	1,376 acres (557 ha)		Luce County	621249
Big Bradford Lake	228 acres (92 ha)	102 feet (31 m)	Crawford County	621297
Big Lake	137 acres (55 ha)		Allegan County	621325
Big Lake	119 acres (48 ha)		Baraga County	621329
Big Lake	733 acres (297 ha)		Gogebic County	
Big Marsh Lake	168 acres (68 ha)		Calhoun County	621335
Big Norway Lake	52 acres (21 ha)	45 feet (14 m)	Clare County	621340
Big Star Lake	912 acres (369 ha)		Lake County	1619205
Birch Lake	326 acres (132 ha)	53 feet (16 m)	Antrim County	621406
Birch Lake	282 acres (114 ha)		Cass County	621408
Birch Lake	181 acres (73 ha)		Gogebic County	1619216
Bird Lake	115 acres (47 ha)		Hillsdale County	621437
Black Lake	10,130 acres (4,100 ha)	50 feet (15 m)	Cheboygan and Presque Isle counties	621515
Black River Lake	113 acres (46 ha)		Gogebic County	621529
Blanch Lake	44 acres (18 ha)	30 feet (9.1 m)	Newaygo County	621564
Blue Lake	31 acres (13 ha)		Alger County	1619255
Boardman Lake	317 acres (128 ha)		Grand Traverse County	621665
Bob Lake	130 acres (53 ha)		Houghton County	1619266
Bone Lake	159 acres (64 ha)		Iron County	621709
Bostwick Lake	217 acres (88 ha)		Kent County	621758
Boyle Lake	24.575 acres (9.945 ha)		Berrien County	621825
Brevoort Lake	4,233 acres (1,713 ha)		Mackinac County	1619317
Bristol Lake	140 acres (57 ha)		Barry County	622009
Brown Bridge Lake	170 acres (69 ha)		Grand Traverse County	
Brighton Lake	164 acres (67 ha)	27 feet (8 m)	Livingston County	
Brill Lake	136 acres (55 ha)		Jackson County	621998
Brown Lake	146 acres (59 ha)		Jackson County	622084
Brule Lake	250 acres (100 ha)		Iron County	622132
Buck Lake	150 acres (61 ha)		Iron County	622178
Budd Lake	175 acres (71 ha)		Clare County	622202
Bunker Lake	113 acres (46 ha)		Cass County	2109335
Burt Lake	17,120 acres (6,930 ha)	73 feet (22 m)	Cheboygan County	1618893
Byram Lake	134 acres (54 ha)		Genesee County	622405
Byron Mill Pond	62 acres (25 ha)		Shiawassee County	
Cable Lake	331 acres (134 ha)		Iron County	622421
Lake Cadillac	1,150 acres (470 ha)	28 feet (8.5 m)	Wexford County	622432
Campau Lake	83 acres (34 ha)	42 feet (13 m)	Kent County	622653
Caribou Lake	829 acres (335 ha)		Chippewa County	622716
Carlton Lake	189 acres (76 ha)		Chippewa County	622735
Carney Lake	115 acres (47 ha)		Dickinson County	622745
Casey Lake	95 acres (38 ha)		Marquette County	622840
Cass Lake	1,280 acres (520 ha)	123 feet (37 m)	Oakland County	622851
Cedar Lake	1,075 acres (435 ha)	8 feet (2.4 m)	Alcona County	619758
Cedar Lake	141 acres (57 ha)		Calhoun County	622919
Cedar Lake	142 acres (57 ha)		Iosco County	
Cedar Lake	50 acres (20 ha)		Grand Traverse County	622932
Cedar Hedge Lake	170 acres (69 ha)		Grand Traverse County	622913
Center Lake	847 acres (343 ha)	40 feet (12 m)	Jackson County	
Chaney Lake	496 acres (201 ha)		Gogebic County	623075
Lake Chapin	485 acres (196 ha)		Berrien County	623095
Lake Charlevoix	17,268 acres (6,988 ha)	120 feet (37 m)	Charlevoix County	1618895
Lake Chemung	310 acres (130 ha)	70 feet (21 m)	Livingston County	623146
Chicago Lake	169 acres (68 ha)		Delta County	623179
Chicagon Lake	1,083 acres (438 ha)	115 feet (35 m)	Iron County	623180
Chippewa Lake	790 acres (320 ha)		Mecosta County	623222
Christiana Lake	179 acres (72 ha)		Cass County	
Christmas Tree Lake	2.87 acres (1.16 ha)		Grand Traverse County	
Cisco Lake	567 acres (229 ha)	20 feet (6.1 m)	Gogebic County	1619509
Clam Lake	420 acres (170 ha)		Antrim County	623327
Clark Lake	836 acres (338 ha)	74 feet (23 m)	Gogebic County	1619513
Clark Lake	576 acres (233 ha)		Jackson County	623355
Clear Lake	187 acres (76 ha)	16 feet (4.9 m)	Barry County	623412
Clear Lake	129 acres (52 ha)		Jackson County	623408
South Clear Lake			Berrien County and St. Joseph County	1624942
Clearwater Lake	177 acres (72 ha)		Gogebic County	1619531
Clifford Lake	195 acres (79 ha)	45 feet (14 m)	Montcalm County	623465
Cloverdale Lake	134 acres (54 ha)		Barry County	623497
Cobb Lake	92 acres (37 ha)		Barry County	
Coffield Lake	27 acres (11 ha)		Grand Traverse County	623539
Colby Lake	25 acres (10 ha)		Shiawassee County	623551
Coldwater Lake	1,610 acres (650 ha)	92 feet (28 m)	Branch County	623569
Coldwater Lake	285 acres (115 ha)		Isabella County	623570
Lake Columbia	840 acres (340 ha)	25 feet (7.6 m)	Jackson County	623642
Cook Lake	845 acres (342 ha)		Alger County	1619566
Cooke Dam Pond	1,635 acres (662 ha)		Iosco County	
Copneconic Lake	118 acres (48 ha)		Genesee and Oakland counties	623803
Corey Lake	630 acres (250 ha)		St. Joseph County	1624475
Corpse Pond	7 acres (2.8 ha)		Ontonagon County	1619589
Corunna Mill Pond	10 acres (4.0 ha)		Shiawassee County	
Coveney Lake			Berrien County	623916
Cowden Lake	111 acres (45 ha)		Montcalm County	623928
Craig Lake	360 acres (150 ha)		Baraga County	623951
Craig Lake	115 acres (47 ha)		Branch County	623952
Big Cranberry Lake	311 acres (126 ha)		Clare County	621302
Cranberry Lake	163 acres (66 ha)		Clare County	
Cranberry Lake	141 acres (57 ha)		Clare County	
Cranberry Lake	56 acres (23 ha)		Oakland County	
Crandell Lake	160 acres (65 ha)		Eaton County	
Crockery Lake	108 acres (44 ha)	54 feet (16 m)	Ottawa County	624073
Crooked Lake	264 acres (107 ha)		Baraga County	
Crooked Lake	644 acres (261 ha)		Barry County	
Crooked Lake	2,352 acres (952 ha)	50 feet (15 m)	Emmet County	624102
Crooked Lake	627 acres (254 ha)		Gogebic County	
Crooked Lake	500 acres (200 ha)		Missaukee County	
Lower Crooked Lake	433 acres (175 ha)		Barry County	
Crystal Lake	9,869 acres (3,994 ha)	162 feet (49 m)	Benzie County	624181
Crystal Lake	794 acres (321 ha)		Hillsdale County	624171
Cub Lake	122 acres (49 ha)		Hillsdale County	624190
Culhane Lake	100 acres (40 ha)	49 feet (15 m)	Luce County	624194
Cummings Lake	20 acres (8.1 ha)		Shiawassee County	
Damon Lake	111 acres (45 ha)		Gogebic County	1619659
Dayton Lake	140 acres (57 ha)		Berrien County	1618898
North Dease Lake	174 acres (70 ha)	50 feet (15 m)	Ogemaw County	1621040
South Dease Lake	269 acres (109 ha)	34 feet (10 m)	Ogemaw County	1621699
Deep Lake	70 acres (28 ha)	50 feet (15 m)	Lenawee County	624450
Deer Island Lake	346 acres (140 ha)	55 feet (17 m)	Gogebic County	1619691
Deer Lake	265 acres (107 ha)		Alger County	
Deer Lake	463 acres (187 ha)	22 feet (6.7 m)	Charlevoix County	
Deer Lake	906 acres (367 ha)		Marquette County	624490
Deer Lake	137 acres (55 ha)	63 feet (19 m)	Oakland County	624471
Lake Delta			Eaton County	
Devils Lake	813 acres (329 ha)		Alpena County	
Devils Lake	1,312 acres (531 ha)	63 feet (19 m)	Lenawee County	
Dewey Lake	226 acres (91 ha)		Cass County	624618
Diamond Lake	1,020 acres (410 ha)	62 feet (19 m)	Cass County	624634
Lake Diane	266 acres (108 ha)		Hillsdale County	
Dickenson Lake	231 acres (93 ha)		Chippewa County	624658
Dinner Lake	108 acres (44 ha)	25 feet (7.6 m)	Gogebic County	1619720
Doc And Tom Lake	295 acres (119 ha)		Clare County	624726
Dockery Lake	9 acres (3.6 ha)		Mason County	1619726
Dog Lake	191 acres (77 ha)		Cheboygan County	624742
Donnell Lake	247 acres (100 ha)	63 feet (19 m)	Cass County	624788
Lake Doster	109 acres (44 ha)		Allegan County	624811
Dinner Lake	108 acres (44 ha)		Gogebic County	1619720
Douglas Lake	3,395 acres (1,374 ha)	79 feet (24 m)	Cheboygan County	1618899
Dry Lake	166 acres (67 ha)		Chippewa County	624900
Lake Dubonnet	645 acres (261 ha)		Grand Traverse County	624912
Duck Lake	123 acres (50 ha)	39 feet (12 m)	Allegan County	
Duck Lake	596 acres (241 ha)		Calhoun County	
Duck Lake	612 acres (248 ha)	25 feet (7.6 m)	Gogebic County	
Duck Lake	1,945 acres (787 ha)	98 feet (30 m)	Grand Traverse County	
Dumont Lake	215 acres (87 ha)	50 feet (15 m)	Allegan County	624975
Duncan Lake	130 acres (53 ha)	55 feet (17 m)	Barry County	624987
Dunn Lakes	10 acres (4.0 ha)		Shiawassee County	625006
Eagle Lake	225 acres (91 ha)	59 feet (18 m)	Allegan and Van Buren counties	625085
Eagle Lake	400 acres (160 ha)		Cass County	625079
Eagle Lake	194 acres (79 ha)	10 feet (3.0 m)	Kalamazoo County	
East Lake	100 acres (40 ha)		Dickinson County	625211
East Twin Lake	830 acres (340 ha)	25 feet (7.6 m)	Montmorency County	625268
Echo Lake	224 acres (91 ha)		Alger County	625328
Eight Point Lake	416 acres (168 ha)		Clare County	625408
Elk Lake	8,195 acres (3,316 ha)	192 feet (59 m)	Antrim and Grand Traverse counties	1617384
Elbow Lake	125 acres (51 ha)		Alpena County	625427
Lake Ellen	139 acres (56 ha)		Iron County	625474
Ellis Lake	42 acres (17 ha)		Grand Traverse County	625489
Ellsworth Lake	107 acres (43 ha)	42 feet (13 m)	Antrim County	625499
Emeline Lake	133 acres (54 ha)		Gogebic County	1619852
Lake Emily	326 acres (132 ha)		Iron County	625577
Lake Erie	6,342,400 acres (2,566,700 ha)	210 feet (64 m)	Monroe County and Wayne counties	1075813
Lake Esau	275 acres (111 ha)	35 feet (11 m)	Presque Isle County	625639
Euler Lake	20 acres (8.1 ha)		Shiawassee County	625656
Fair Lake	226 acres (91 ha)		Barry County	
Farewell Lake	219 acres (89 ha)		Jackson County	
Fence Lake	233 acres (94 ha)		Baraga County	
Fence Lake	167 acres (68 ha)		Iron County	
Fennessy Lake	59 acres (24 ha)	10 feet (3.0 m)	Ottawa County	
Lake Fenton	845 acres (342 ha)	92 feet (28 m)	Genesee County	625897
Fife Lake	606 acres (245 ha)		Kalkaska and Grand Traverse counties	
Finch Lake	132 acres (53 ha)		Cass County	
Fine Lake	324 acres (131 ha)		Barry County	
Fire Lake	129 acres (52 ha)		Iron County	
First Lake	337 acres (136 ha)		Chippewa County	
First Fortune Lake	184 acres (74 ha)		Iron County	
Big Fish Lake	85 acres (34 ha)	70 feet (21 m)	Lapeer County	
Fish Lake	134 acres (54 ha)		Alger County	
Fish Lake	151 acres (61 ha)	56 feet (17 m)	Barry County	
Fish Lake	334 acres (135 ha)		Cass County	
Little Fish Lake	127 acres (51 ha)		Cass County	
Fisher Lake	31 acres (13 ha)	39 feet (12 m)	Gogebic County	626068
Fishers Lake	327 acres (132 ha)	42 feet (13 m)	St. Joseph County	
Fisk Lake	26 acres (11 ha)		Kent County	626090
Five Lakes	119 acres (48 ha)		Clare County	
Lake Five	17 acres (6.9 ha)		Kalkaska County	626121
Fletcher Pond	8,970 acres (3,630 ha)	10 feet (3.0 m)	Alpena and Montmorency counties	626165
Flint Park Lake (Devil's Lake)	19 acres (7.7 ha)		Genesee County	
Font Lake	357 acres (144 ha)		Charlevoix County	
Foote Dam Pond	1,695 acres (686 ha)		Iosco County	
Ford Lake	975 acres (395 ha)	30 feet (9.1 m)	Washtenaw County	626231
Fourth Lake	243 acres (98 ha)		Chippewa County	
French Farm Lake	802 acres (325 ha)		Emmet County	1619970
Frenchman Lake	185 acres (75 ha)		Chippewa County	
Fumee Lake	479 acres (194 ha)		Dickinson County	626571
Gene Pond	574 acres (232 ha)		Dickinson County	
Lake Geneserath	480 acres (190 ha)		Charlevoix County	
George Lake	158 acres (64 ha)		Baraga County	
George Lake	535 acres (217 ha)		Branch County	
Lake George			Chippewa County, Michigan and Algoma District, Northwestern Ontario	1623177
Lake George	129 acres (52 ha)		Clare County	
Lake Gerald	356 acres (144 ha)		Houghton County	
Gilead Lake	130 acres (53 ha)	49 feet (15 m)	Branch County	
Gilletts Lake	350 acres (140 ha)	30 feet (9.1 m)	Jackson County	626828
Glen Lake	4,871 acres (1,971 ha)	130 feet (40 m)	Leelanau County	626874
Little Glen Lake	1,415 acres (573 ha)	13 feet (4.0 m)	Leelanau County	
Lake Gogebic	13,380 acres (5,410 ha)	35 feet (11 m)	Gogebic and Ontonagon counties	1620035
Goguac Lake	352 acres (142 ha)	66 feet (20 m)	Calhoun County	626924
Golden Lake	274 acres (111 ha)		Iron County	
Goose Lake	118 acres (48 ha)		Cass County	
Goose Lake	370 acres (150 ha)		Jackson County	
Goose Lake	410 acres (170 ha)		Marquette County	626975
Gooseneck Lake	128 acres (52 ha)		Delta County	
Goshorn Lake			Allegan County, Michigan	627010
Gourdneck Lake	218 acres (88.2 ha)	51 feet (15.5 m)	Kalamazoo County	
Graham Lake	139 acres (56 ha)		Calhoun County	
North Graham Lake	10 acres (4.0 ha)		Shiawassee County	
South Graham Lake	12 acres (4.9 ha)		Shiawassee County	
Grand Lake	5,660 acres (2,290 ha)	25 feet (7.6 m)	Presque Isle County	627090
Grand Marias Lake	127 acres (51 ha)		Chippewa County	
Grand Sable Lake	630 acres (250 ha)	85 feet (26 m)	Alger County	627113
Grass Lake	337 acres (136 ha)		Alpena County	
Grass Lake	139 acres (56 ha)		Benzie County	
Grass Lake	353 acres (143 ha)		Jackson County	
Grass Lake	632 acres (256 ha)	6 feet (1.8 m)	Montmorency County	
Lake Gratiot	1,438 acres (582 ha)	70 feet (21 m)	Keweenaw County	627235
Gravel Lake	296 acres (120 ha)		Van Buren County	627243
Green Lake	309 acres (125 ha)	69 feet (21 m)	Allegan County	
Green Lake	1,995 acres (807 ha)	102 feet (31 m)	Grand Traverse County	1623734
Greens Lake	117 acres (47 ha)	55 feet (17 m)	Oakland County	627364
Lake Gribben	47 acres (19 ha)		Marquette County	627425
Guernsey Lake	217 acres (88 ha)		Barry County	627496
Gull Lake	2,046 acres (828 ha)	110 feet (34 m)	Barry and Kalamazoo counties	627518
Gulliver Lake	881 acres (357 ha)	28 feet (8.5 m)	Schoolcraft County	627527
Gun Lake	2,680 acres (1,080 ha)	65 feet (20 m)	Allegan and Barry counties	627533
Gun Lake	233 acres (94 ha)		Mason County	627532
Hagerman Lake	565 acres (229 ha)	55 feet (17 m)	Iron County	627597
Half-Moon Lake	64 acres (26 ha)	82 feet (25 m)	Muskegon County	
Hamlin Lake	4,990 acres (2,020 ha)	80 feet (24 m)	Mason County	1620116
Hanley Lake	93 acres (38 ha)		Antrim County	627728
Hardwood Impoundment	309 acres (125 ha)		Dickinson County	
Hardwood Lake	172 acres (70 ha)	35 feet (11 m)	Ogemaw County	
Harwood Lake	118 acres (48 ha)		Cass County	
Headquarters Lake	22 acres (8.9 ha)		Grand Traverse County	
Heart Lake	169 acres (68 ha)		Gogebic County	
Heart Lake	67 acres (27 ha)	117 feet (36 m)	Otsego County	628034
Helen Lake	100 acres (40 ha)		Marquette County	
Hemingway Lake	10 acres (4.0 ha)		Shiawassee County	
Hemlock Lake	150 acres (61 ha)		Hillsdale County	
Herendeene Lake	39 acres (16 ha)	37 feet (11 m)	Benzie County	
Lower Herring Lake	450 acres (180 ha)		Benzie County	
Upper Herring Lake	572 acres (231 ha)		Benzie County	
Higgins Lake	9,600 acres (3,900 ha)	135 feet (41 m)	Roscommon County	628219
High Lake	47 acres (19 ha)		Grand Traverse County	
Hoffman Lake	119 acres (48 ha)		Charlevoix County	
Holloway Reservoir	1,975 acres (799 ha)		Genesee and Lapeer counties	
Homan Lake	153 acres (62 ha)		Iron County	
Homer Lake	240 acres (97 ha)		Calhoun County	
Hopkins Lake	18 acres (7.3 ha)		Shiawassee County	
Houghton Lake	20,075 acres (8,124 ha)	21 feet (6.4 m)	Roscommon County	628664
Hubbard Lake	8,768 acres (3,548 ha)	87 feet (27 m)	Alcona County	628741
Huellmantel Lake	18 acres (7.3 ha)		Grand Traverse County	
Hugaboom Lake	31 acres (13 ha)		Delta County	628790
Hulbert Lake	562 acres (227 ha)		Chippewa County	
Lake Huron	14,726,400 acres (5,959,600 ha)	750 feet (230 m)	Multiple	1624619
Hutchins Lake	376 acres (152 ha)	34 feet (10 m)	Allegan County	
Huyck Lake	193 acres (78 ha)		Branch County	
Lake Independence	1,860 acres (750 ha)	30 feet (9.1 m)	Marquette County	4998558
Indian Lake	119 acres (48 ha)		Barry County	
Indian Lake	506 acres (205 ha)	28 feet (8.5 m)	Cass County	628997
Indian Lake	129 acres (52 ha)		Gogebic County	
Indian Lake	57 acres (23 ha)		Grand Traverse County	
Indian Lake	214 acres (87 ha)		Iosco County	
Indian Lake	197 acres (80 ha)		Iron County	
Indian Lake	42 acres (17 ha)	18 feet (5.5 m)	Kalkaska County	
Indian Lake	8,647 acres (3,499 ha)	15 feet (4.6 m)	Schoolcraft County	1620300
Indian Lake	18 acres (7.3 ha)		Oscoda County	
Indian Lake	55 acres (22 ha)		Oscoda County	
Indiana Lake	121 acres (49 ha)		Cass County	
Intermediate Lake	1,520 acres (620 ha)		Antrim County	629055
Lake Interstate	20 acres (8.1 ha)		Eaton County	
Iron Lake	390 acres (160 ha)		Iron County	
Ironjaw Lake	51 acres (21 ha)		Schoolcraft County	629083
Lake Isabella	701 acres (284 ha)		Isabella County	
Island Lake	111 acres (45 ha)		Grand Traverse County	
Island Lake	64 acres (26 ha)		Ogemaw and Oscoda counties	
James Lake	209 acres (85 ha)	10 feet (3.0 m)	Iron County	
Jarvis Lake	19.54 acres (7.91 ha)		Berrien County	629215
Jewell Lake	184 acres (74 ha)		Alcona County	
Jordan Lake	417 acres (169 ha)		Barry County	
Jose Lake	122 acres (49 ha)		Iosco County	
Joslin Lake	187 acres (76 ha)	20 feet (6.1 m)	Washtenaw County	
Juno Lake	190 acres (77 ha)		Cass County	
Kalamazoo Lake	321 acres (130 ha)		Allegan County	
Kanause Lake	30 acres (12 ha)		Shiawassee County	
Kearsley Reservoir	169 acres (68 ha)		Genesee County	
Kent Lake	1,015 acres (411 ha)	38 feet (12 m)	Oakland and Livingston Counties	629604
Klutes Lakes	7.248 acres (2.933 ha)		Berrien County	
KP Lake	109 acres (44 ha)		Crawford County	
La Grange Lake	226 acres (91 ha)		Cass County	
Kates Lake	127 acres (51 ha)		Dickinson County	
Leisure Lake	75 acres (30 ha)		Shiawassee County	
Little King Lake	133 acres (54 ha)		Baraga County	
Littlefield Lake	140 acres (57 ha)		Isabella County	
King Lake	502 acres (203 ha)		Baraga County	
Kingston Lake	122 acres (49 ha)		Alger County	
Klinger Lake	835 acres (338 ha)		St. Joseph County	
Kneff Lakes	13 acres (5.3 ha)		Crawford County	
Lac La Belle	1,205 acres (488 ha)	30 feet (9.1 m)	Keweenaw County	629901
Lac Vieux Desert	4,370 acres (1,770 ha)	38 feet (12 m)	Gogebic County, Michigan and Vilas County, Wisconsin	1579612
Lake Fanny Hooe	227 acres (92 ha)	40 feet (12 m)	Keweenaw County	625823
Lake of the Clouds	133 acres (54 ha)		Ontonagon County	623493
Lake of the Woods	172 acres (70 ha)	14 feet (4.3 m)	Antrim County	
Lake of the Woods	334 acres (135 ha)		Branch County	
Lakeville Lake	460 acres (190 ha)	68 feet (21 m)	Oakland County	630070
Lamberton Lake	29 acres (12 ha)		Kent County	630096
Lake Lansing	485 acres (196 ha)		Ingham County	630143
Larks Lake	592 acres (240 ha)		Emmet County	
Lake Lavine	87 acres (35 ha)	71 feet (22 m)	Branch County	630201
Leach Lake	107 acres (43 ha)	52 feet (16 m)	Barry County	
Lake LeAnn	199 acres (81 ha)		Hillsdale County	
Lake LeAnn	268 acres (108 ha)		Hillsdale County	
Langford Lake	482 acres (195 ha)		Gogebic County	
Lee Lake	131 acres (53 ha)		Calhoun County	
North Lake Leelanau	2,914 acres (1,179 ha)	121 feet (37 m)	Leelanau County	
South Lake Leelanau	5,693 acres (2,304 ha)	62 feet (19 m)	Leelanau County	
Light Lake	131 acres (53 ha)		Iron County	
Lily Lake	190 acres (77 ha)		Clare County	
Lime Lake	670 acres (270 ha)	65 feet (20 m)	Leelanau County	630428
North Lime Lake	75 acres (30 ha)	30 feet (9.1 m)	Jackson County	
South Lime Lake	96 acres (39 ha)	27 feet (8.2 m)	Jackson County	
Lincoln Lake	417 acres (169 ha)	67 feet (20 m)	Kent County	
Lindsley Lake	156 acres (63 ha)		Gogebic County	
Little Norway Lake	18.7 acres (7.6 ha)	38 feet (12 m)	Clare County	
Little Pleasant Lake	29 acres (12 ha)		St. Jooseph County	
Little Portage Lake	154 acres (62 ha)		Jackson County	
Little Wolf Lake	109 acres (44 ha)		Jackson County	
Liver Lake	115 acres (47 ha)		Iron County	
Lobdell Lake	546 acres (221 ha)		Genesee County	
Lombard Lake	134 acres (54 ha)		Hillsdale County	
Londo Lake	179 acres (72 ha)		Iosco County	
West Londo Lake	198 acres (80 ha)		Iosco County	
East Long Lake	122 acres (49 ha)		Branch County	
Little Long Lake	170 acres (69 ha)		Barry County	
Long Lake	5,342 acres (2,162 ha)	25 feet (7.6 m)	Alpena and Presque Isle counties	630968
Long Lake	262 acres (106 ha)		Barry County	
Long Lake	147 acres (59 ha)		Barry County	
Long Lake	75 acres (30 ha)	49 feet (15 m)	Barry County	
Long Lake	327 acres (132 ha)		Benzie County	
Long Lake	241 acres (98 ha)		Cass County	
Long Lake	379 acres (153 ha)		Cheboygan County	
Long Lake	211 acres (85 ha)		Clare County	
Long Lake	172 acres (70 ha)		Gogebic County	
Long Lake	2,911 acres (1,178 ha)	88 feet (27 m)	Grand Traverse County	630966
Long Lake	213 acres (86 ha)		Hillsdale County	
Long Lake	155 acres (63 ha)		Hillsdale County	
Long Lake	357 acres (144 ha)		Ionia County	
Long Lake	486 acres (197 ha)		Iosco County	
Long Lake	416 acres (168 ha)		Iosco County	
Long Lake	60 acres (24 ha)	105 feet (32 m)	Iron County	
Long Lake	78 acres (32 ha)	20 feet (6.1 m)	Kalkaska County	630942
Long Lake	66 acres (27 ha)	15 feet (4.6 m)	Missaukee County	
Long Lake	295 acres (119 ha)	90 feet (27 m)	Montmorency County	630967
Loon Lake	417 acres (169 ha)	107 feet (33 m)	Iosco County	1620619
Loon Lake	156 acres (63 ha)		Genesee County	
Loon Lake	375 acres (152 ha)	53 feet (16 m)	Gogebic County	1620622
Loon Lake	243 acres (98 ha)	73 feet (22 m)	Oakland County	631042
Loon Lake	4 acres (1.6 ha)		Shiawassee County	
Lost Lake	106 acres (43 ha)		Alger County	
Lost Lake	66 acres (27 ha)		Clare County	631084
Loud Dam Pond	591 acres (239 ha)		Iosco County	
Lyon Lake	92 acres (37 ha)		Calhoun County	631240
Lake Macatawa	1,700 acres (690 ha)	50 feet (15 m)	Ottawa County	631276
Madron Lake	65 acres (26 ha)		Berrien County	1618920
Magician Lake	522 acres (211 ha)		Cass County	
Mallard Lake	163 acres (66 ha)		Iron County	
Mamie Lake	337 acres (136 ha)		Gogebic County	
Mandon Lake	26 acres (11 ha)		Oakland County	631379
Manistee Lake	1,051 acres (425 ha)		Manistee County	1620682
Manistique Lake	10,346 acres (4,187 ha)	20 feet (6.1 m)	Luce and Mackinac counties	631385
North Manistique Lake	1,700 acres (690 ha)		Luce County	
South Manistique Lake	4,133 acres (1,673 ha)	29 feet (8.8 m)	Mackinac County	
Lake Manitou	75 acres (30 ha)		Shiawassee County	
Lake Marion	110 acres (45 ha)		Charlevoix County	
Marble Lake	741 acres (300 ha)	60 feet (18 m)	Branch County	
Lake Margrethe	1,920 acres (780 ha)	65 feet (20 m)	Crawford County	631549
Marion Lake	297 acres (120 ha)		Gogebic County	
Marl Lake	125 acres (51 ha)		Chippewa County	
Marsh Lake	5 acres (2.0 ha)		Shiawassee County	
Marten Lake	180 acres (73 ha)		Iron County	
Lake Mary	270 acres (110 ha)		Iron County	
Matteson Lake	313 acres (127 ha)	38 feet (11.6 m)	Branch County	
May Lake	117 acres (47 ha)		Baraga County	
McDonald Lake	471 acres (191 ha)		Gogebic County	
McNearney Lake	123 acres (50 ha)		Chippewa County	
Lake Medora	700 acres (280 ha)		Keweenaw County	632072
Merrill Lake	3 acres (1.2 ha)		Shiawassee County	
Michigamme Lake	470 acres (190 ha)		Iron County	
Michigamme Reservoir	7,200 acres (2,900 ha)	42 feet (13 m)	Iron County	
Lake Michigamme	4,292 acres (1,737 ha)	72 feet (22 m)	Baraga and Marquette counties	632202
Lake Michigan	14,336,000 acres (5,802,000 ha)	923 feet (281 m)	Multiple	1623080
Middle Lake	240 acres (97 ha)		Alpena County	
Middle Lake	135 acres (55 ha)		Barry County	
Milakokia Lake	1,956 acres (792 ha)	26 feet (7.9 m)	Mackinac County	632299
Mill Lake	116 acres (47 ha)		Gogebic County	
Mill Lake	130 acres (53 ha)		Washtenaw County	
Miner Lake	325 acres (132 ha)	83 feet (25 m)	Allegan County	
Minnie Lake	117 acres (47 ha)		Iron County	
Mirror Lake	91 acres (37 ha)		Ontonagon County	
Lake Missaukee	1,800 acres (730 ha)	27 feet (8.2 m)	Missaukee County	632496
Lake Mitchell	2,649 acres (1,072 ha)	28 feet (8.5 m)	Wexford County	1620868
Lake Mitigwaki	261 acres (106 ha)		Iron County	
Mona Lake	695 acres (281 ha)	42 feet (13 m)	Muskegon County	632555
Monocle Lake	172 acres (70 ha)		Chippewa County	
Lake Montcalm	67 acres (27 ha)		Montcalm County	
Monterey Lake	194 acres (79 ha)		Allegan County	
Moon Lake	50 acres (20 ha)		Shiawassee County	
Morgan Lake	15 acres (6.1 ha)		Shiawassee County	
Morrison Lake	315 acres (127 ha)		Ionia County	
C S Mott Lake	596 acres (241 ha)		Genesee County	
Moosehead Lake	51 acres (21 ha)	39 feet (12 m)	Gogebic County	
Morrison Lake	290 acres (120 ha)		Branch County	
Moraine Lake	90 acres (36 ha)	22 feet (6.7 m)	Gogebic County	
Moss Lake	1,054 acres (427 ha)	5 feet (1.5 m)	Delta County	1620910
Mountain Lake	106 acres (43 ha)		Gogebic County	
Mowe Lake	24 acres (9.7 ha)		Delta County	1620922
Big Mud Lake	231 acres (93 ha)		Clare County	
Mud Lake	187 acres (76 ha)		Alpena County	
Mud Lake	132 acres (53 ha)		Barry County	
Mud Lake	108 acres (44 ha)		Calhoun County	
Mud Lake	38 acres (15 ha)		Grand Traverse County	
Mud Lake	173 acres (70 ha)		Houghton County	
Mud Lake	120 acres (49 ha)		Jackson County	
Mullett Lake	16,630 acres (6,730 ha)	148 feet (45 m)	Cheboygan County	633106
Muncie Lake	68 acres (28 ha)		Grand Traverse County	
Munro Lake	515 acres (208 ha)		Cheboygan County	
Murphy Lake	48 acres (19 ha)		Berrien County	633140
Murphy Lake	12 acres (4.9 ha)		Iron County	1620959
Murphy Lake	10 acres (4.0 ha)		Newaygo County	1620957
Murphy Lake	133 acres (54 ha)		Schoolcraft County	1620958
Murphy Lake	209 acres (85 ha)		Tuscola County	633141
Murray Lake	320 acres (130 ha)	72 feet (22 m)	Kent County	633155
Muskegon Lake	4,232 acres (1,713 ha)	79 feet (24 m)	Muskegon County	1620964
Narrow Lake	119 acres (48 ha)		Eaton County	
Nawakwa Lake	442 acres (179 ha)		Alger County	
Ned Lake	794 acres (321 ha)		Baraga County	
Lake Nepessing	427 acres (173 ha)	25 feet (7.6 m)	Lapeer County	
Nevins Lake	274 acres (111 ha)		Alger County	
Nevins Lake	55 acres (22 ha)	60 feet (18 m)	Montcalm County	
Newburgh Lake	152 acres (62 ha)		Wayne County	633358
Nichols Lake	153 acres (62 ha)	50 feet (15 m)	Newaygo County	
Lake Nineteen	26 acres (11 ha)		Schoolcraft County	1621013
Ninth Street Pond	366 acres (148 ha)		Alpena County	
Norvell Lake	120 acres (49 ha)		Jackson County	
Norway Lake	52 acres (21 ha)	20 feet (6.1 m)	Iron County	
Norwood Lake	116 acres (47 ha)		Gogebic County	
Nottawa Lake	124 acres (50 ha)		Calhoun County	
Nowland Lake	123 acres (50 ha)		Charlevoix County	
O'Neal Lake	138 acres (56 ha)		Emmet County	
Lake Oakland	255 acres (103 ha)	64 feet (20 m)	Oakland County	633884
Oliverda Lake	145 acres (59 ha)		Branch County	
Orchard Lake	795 acres (322 ha)	110 feet (34 m)	Oakland County	634089
Osterhout Lake	168 acres (68 ha)	30 feet (9.1 m)	Allegan County	
Ostrander Lake	54 acres (22 ha)		Delta, Alger, and Schoolcraft counties	634148
Otis Lake	128 acres (52 ha)		Barry County	
Otsego Lake	1,972 acres (798 ha)	25 feet (7.6 m)	Otsego County	634159
Lake Ottawa	532 acres (215 ha)		Iron County	
Otter Lake	863 acres (349 ha)		Houghton County	
Lake Ovid	413 acres (167 ha)	20 feet (6.1 m)	Clinton County	1617044
East Paint Lake	120 acres (49 ha)		Iron County	
Paint Lake	240 acres (97 ha)		Iron County	
Painter Lake	103 acres (42 ha)		Cass County	
Palmer Lake	497.7 acres (201 ha)	42 feet (12.8 m)	Branch County	
Lake Paradise	1,900 acres (770 ha)	18 feet (5.5 m)	Cheboygan and Emmet counties	2099825
Paradise Lake	186 acres (75 ha)		Cass County	
Parent Lake	184 acres (74 ha)		Baraga County	
Park Lake	185 acres (75 ha)		Clinton County	
Pats Lake	228 acres (92 ha)		Chippewa County	
Little Paw Paw Lake	101 acres (41 ha)		Berrien County	
Paw Paw Lake	922 acres (373 ha)		Berrien County	634489
Payne Lake	113 acres (46 ha)		Barry County	
Pearl Lake	302 acres (122 ha)		Benzie County	
Peavy Pond	2,347 acres (950 ha)		Iron County	
Pendills Lake	219 acres (89 ha)		Chippewa County	
Perch Lake	117 acres (47 ha)		Alger County	
Perch Lake	1,038 acres (420 ha)		Iron County	
Perch Lake	3 acres (1.2 ha)		Shiawassee County	
Petticoat Lake	129 acres (52 ha)		Baraga County	
Piatt Lake	251 acres (102 ha)		Chippewa County	
Pickerel Lake	1,082 acres (438 ha)	74 feet (23 m)	Emmet County	
Pickerel Lake	3 acres (1.2 ha)		Shiawassee County	
Pike Lake	32 acres (13 ha)	55 feet (17 m)	Allegan County	
Pike Lake	90 acres (36 ha)	37 feet (11 m)	Marquette County	
Big Pine Island Lake	195 acres (79 ha)	45 feet (14 m)	Kent County	
Pine Lake	611 acres (247 ha)	34 feet (10 m)	Barry County	
Pine Lake	128 acres (52 ha)		Calhoun and Eaton counties	
Pine Lake	105 acres (42 ha)		Genesee County	
Pipestone Lake	115 acres (47 ha)		Berrien County	
Platte Lake	2,550 acres (1,030 ha)	95 feet (29 m)	Benzie County	635084
Little Platte Lake	896 acres (363 ha)	8 feet (2.4 m)	Benzie County	
Pleasant Lake	141 acres (57 ha)		Barry County	
Pleasant Lake	372 acres (151 ha)		Branch County	
Pleasant Lake	268 acres (108 ha)		Jackson County	
Pleasant Lake	262 acres (106 ha)		St. Joseph County	
Pleiness Lake			Mason County	1624214
Plum Lake	228 acres (92 ha)		Gogebic County	
Pole Creek Lake	89 acres (36 ha)	10 feet (3.0 m)	Delta County	
Pomeroy Lake	314 acres (127 ha)		Gogebic County	
Lake Ponemah	410 acres (170 ha)		Genesee County	
Poor Lake	106 acres (43 ha)		Gogebic County	
Portage Lake	9,640 acres (3,900 ha)	54 feet (16 m)	Houghton County	
Portage Lake	398 acres (161 ha)		Jackson County	
Portage Lake	2,110 acres (850 ha)	60 feet (18 m)	Manistee County	1621297
Portage Lake	510 acres (210 ha)	37 feet (11 m)	St. Joseph County	
Porter Lake	269 acres (109 ha)		Iron County	
Potter Lake	111 acres (45 ha)		Calhoun County	
Potters Lake	125 acres (51 ha)		Genesee County	
Powell Lake			Oakland County	
Pratt Lake	188 acres (76 ha)	28 feet (8.5 m)	Gladwin County	635403
Prickett Lake	810 acres (330 ha)	56 feet (17 m)	Houghton and Baraga counties	1621317
Rainbow Lake	304 acres (123 ha)		Gratiot County	
Reeds Lake	265 acres (107 ha)	66 feet (20 m)	Kent County	635766
Rennie Lake	226 acres (91 ha)		Grand Traverse County	635798
Rice Lake	656 acres (265 ha)		Houghton County	
Rifle Lake	185 acres (75 ha)	72 feet (22 m)	Ogemaw County	
Robinson Lake	78 acres (32 ha)		Iron County	
Rollway Lake	40 acres (16 ha)		Newaygo County	1621428
Lake Roland	258 acres (104 ha)	40 feet (12 m)	Houghton County	
Rose Lake	20 acres (8.1 ha)		Shiawassee County	
Ross Lake	249 acres (101 ha)		Gladwin County	
Round Lake	475 acres (192 ha)		Delta County	1621450
Round Lake	353 acres (143 ha)		Emmet County	
Round Lake	152 acres (62 ha)		Jackson County	
Round Lake	15 acres (6.1 ha)		Shiawassee County	
Rush Lake	119 acres (48 ha)		Benzie County	
Rush Lake	946 acres (383 ha)		Huron County	
Ruth Lake	189 acres (76 ha)		Baraga County	
Sage Lake	785 acres (318 ha)	80 feet (24 m)	Ogemaw County	636493
Saint Johns Lake	126 acres (51 ha)		Baraga County	
Saint Marys Lake	118 acres (48 ha)		Calhoun County	
Lake St. Clair	275,200 acres (111,400 ha)	27 feet (8.2 m)	Multiple	1624888
Lake St. Helen	2,400 acres (970 ha)		Roscommon County	636667
Lake Sainte Kathryn	166 acres (67 ha)		Iron County	
Sand Lake	245 acres (99 ha)		Iosco County	
Sand Lake	440 acres (180 ha)	53 feet (16 m)	Lenawee County	
Sandy Lake	101 acres (41 ha)		Houghton County	
Sanford Lake	1,429 acres (578 ha)		Midland County	637242
Lake Sapphire	264 acres (107 ha)		Missaukee County	
Sauger Lake	35 acres (14 ha)		Shiawassee County	
Sawyer Lake	238 acres (96 ha)		Dickinson County	
Scenic Lake	140 acres (57 ha)		Shiawassee County	
Schoolhouse Lake	37 acres (15 ha)	49 feet (15 m)	Oakland County	637425
Lower Scott Lake	121 acres (49 ha)		Allegan County	
Second Lake	251 acres (102 ha)		Chippewa County	
Second Lake	400 acres (160 ha)		Gladwin County	
Second Fortune Lake	128 acres (52 ha)		Iron County	
Sessions Lake	139 acres (56 ha)		Ionia County	
Selkirk Lake	94 acres (38 ha)	39 feet (12 m)	Allegan County	
Shank Lake	246 acres (100 ha)		Iron County	
Shavehead Lake	299 acres (121 ha)		Cass County	
Shaw Lake	100 acres (40 ha)		Shiawassee County	
Sheephead Lake	490 acres (200 ha)		Chippewa County	
Sheets Lake	39 acres (16 ha)		Livingston County	
Sheffer Lake	12 acres (4.9 ha)	30 feet (9.1 m)	Allegan County	
Shelldrake Lake	264 acres (107 ha)		Chippewa County	
Shellenbarger Lake	114 acres (46 ha)		Crawford County	
Shinanguag Lake	236 acres (96 ha)		Genesee County	
Shoreline Lake	125 acres (51 ha)		Shiawassee County	
Shupac Lake	105 acres (42 ha)		Crawford County	
Silver Lake	208 acres (84 ha)		Branch County	
Silver Lake	146 acres (59 ha)		Cheboygan County	
Silver Lake	108 acres (44 ha)		Dickinson County	
Silver Lake	310 acres (130 ha)		Genesee County	
Silver Lake	609 acres (246 ha)	96 feet (29 m)	Grand Traverse County	637948
Silver Lake	131 acres (53 ha)		Iron County	
Silver Lake	101 acres (41 ha)	73 feet (22 m)	Oakland County	637943
Silver Lake	673 acres (272 ha)	25 feet (7.6 m)	Oceana County	
Silver Lake Basin	1,425 acres (577 ha)		Marquette County	
Singer Lake	25.861 acres (10.466 ha)		Berrien County	
Siskiwit Lake	4,150 acres (1,680 ha)		Keweenaw County	1618310
Lake Sixteen	136 acres (55 ha)		Cheboygan County	
Sixteenmile Lake	449 acres (182 ha)		Alger County	
Sixmile Lake	369 acres (149 ha)	31 feet (9.4 m)	Antrim and Charlevoix counties	
Sixmile Lake	101 acres (41 ha)		Dickinson County	
Lake Sixteen	35 acres (14 ha)	85 feet (26 m)	Allegan County	
Lake Skegemog	2,766 acres (1,119 ha)	29 feet (8.8 m)	Antrim, Grand Traverse, and Kalkaska counties	638052
Smallwood Lake	371 acres (150 ha)		Gladwin County	
Smoky Lake	596 acres (241 ha)		Iron County	
Lake Solitude	203 acres (82 ha)		Iosco County	
Lake Somerset	172 acres (70 ha)		Hillsdale County	
South Lake	158 acres (64 ha)		Branch County	
Spider Lake	450 acres (180 ha)		Grand Traverse County	638508
Spring Lake	1,297 acres (525 ha)	43 feet	Ottawa County and Muskegon County	
Spring Lake (Iron County)	111 acres (45 ha)		Iron County	
Stager Lake	109 acres (44 ha)		Iron County	
Stanley Lake	319 acres (129 ha)		Iron County	
Starvation Lake	125 acres (51 ha)	47 feet (14 m)	Kalkaska County	638755
Stateline Lake	211 acres (85 ha)		Gogebic County	
Lake Stella	314 acres (127 ha)		Alger County	1621769
Stevenson Lake	157 acres (64 ha)		Isabella County	
Stone Lake	157 acres (64 ha)		Cass County	
Stoner Lake	72 acres (29 ha)		Alger County	1621782
Stony Lake	225 acres (91 ha)		Jackson County	
Stony Lake	278 acres (113 ha)	42 feet (13 m)	Oceana County	
Strawberry Lake	257 acres (104 ha)	52 feet (16 m)	Livingston County	638943
Strombolis Lake	13 acres (5.3 ha)		Grand Traverse County	
Stuart Lake	115 acres (47 ha)		Calhoun County	
Sucker Lake	463 acres (187 ha)		Gogebic County	
Sun Sun Lake	50 acres (20 ha)		Marquette County	
Sunday Lake	226 acres (91 ha)		Gogebic County	
Sunken Lake			Presque Isle County	
Sunset Lake	545 acres (221 ha)	54 feet	Iron County	
Lake Superior	20,364,800 acres (8,241,300 ha)	1,332 feet (406 m)	Multiple	1618946
Susan Lake	126 acres (51 ha)		Charlevoix County	
Swains Lake	70 acres (28 ha)	60 feet (18 m)	Jackson County	639138
Swan Lake	214 acres (87 ha)		Allegan County	
Swan Lake	160 acres (65 ha)		Iron County	
Swezzey Lake	103 acres (42 ha)		Jackson County	
Tamarack Lake	331 acres (134 ha)		Montcalm County	
Tar Lake	4 acres (1.6 ha)	27 feet (8.2 m)	Antrim County	
Tawas Lake	1,616 acres (654 ha)	5 feet (1.5 m)	Iosco County	1614606
Taylor Lake	112 acres (45 ha)		Gogebic County	
Tea Lake	204 acres (83 ha)	70 feet (21 m)	Oscoda County	
Teal Lake	466 acres (189 ha)		Marquette County	1614644
Lake Templene	900 acres (360 ha)		St. Joseph County	2706040
Tenderfoot Lake	455 acres (184 ha)		Gogebic County	
Tepee Lake	120 acres (49 ha)	40 feet (12 m)	Iron County	
Thayer Lake	110 acres (45 ha)		Antrim County	1614701
Thayer Lake			Keweenaw County	1614702
Third Fortune Lake	110 acres (45 ha)		Iron County	
Lake Thirteen	95 acres (38 ha)	32 feet (9.8 m)	Clare County	1614740
Thornapple Lake	415 acres (168 ha)	31 feet (9.4 m)	Barry County	
Thousand Island Lake	1,009 acres (408 ha)	81 feet (25 m)	Gogebic County	
Three Mile Lake	176 acres (71 ha)	35 feet (11 m)	Van Buren County	
Thumb Lake (Lake Louise)	484 acres (196 ha)	152 feet (46 m)	Charlevoix County	1614835
Tims Lake	103 acres (42 ha)		Jackson County	
Tobico Marsh Lake	643 acres (260 ha)		Bay County	
Little Tom Lake	17 acres (6.9 ha)	14 feet (4.3 m)	Allegan County	
Toms Lake	23 acres (9.3 ha)		Delta, Alger, and Schoolcraft counties	1614949
Tonawanda Lake	44 acres (18 ha)		Grand Traverse County	
Torch Lake	18,722 acres (7,577 ha)	285 feet (87 m)	Antrim and Kalkaska counties	1614970
Torch Lake	2,659 acres (1,076 ha)	120 feet (37 m)	Houghton County	1614969
Tower Pond	322 acres (130 ha)		Cheboygan County	
Townline Lake	73 acres (30 ha)	50 feet (15 m)	Mecosta County	1615011
Townline Lake	289 acres (117 ha)	49 feet (15 m)	Montcalm County	
Big Trout Lake	254 acres (103 ha)		Chippewa County	
Trout Lake	568 acres (230 ha)		Chippewa County	
Truax Lake	29 acres (12 ha)		Grand Traverse County	
Turtle Lake	41 acres (17 ha)	22 feet (6.7 m)	Benzie County	
Turtle Lake	136 acres (55 ha)		Calhoun County	
Lake Twenty	124 acres (50 ha)		Gladwin County	
Twin Lakes	198 acres (80 ha)		Cheboygan County	
Twin Lakes	5 acres (2.0 ha)		Shiawassee County	
Union Lake	544 acres (220 ha)		Branch County	
Upper Silver Lake	127 acres (51 ha)		Oceana County	
Van Auken Lake	249 acres (101 ha)	47 feet (14 m)	Van Buren County	
Van Etten Lake	1,409 acres (570 ha)	33 feet (10 m)	Iosco County	1615473
Van Norman Lake	66 acres (27 ha)	90 feet (27 m)	Oakland County	1615484
Vandercook Lake	147 acres (59 ha)		Jackson County	
Vandervoight Lake	28 acres (11 ha)		Grand Traverse County	
Vaughn Lake	112 acres (45 ha)		Alcona County	
Verdant Lake	25 acres (10 ha)		Schoolcraft County	1622020
Lake Victoria	143 acres (58 ha)		Clinton County	
Vineyard Lake	541 acres (219 ha)		Jackson County	
Wabasis Lake	418 acres (169 ha)	57 feet (17 m)	Kent County	
Wagner Lake	108 acres (44 ha)		Iron County	
Wakeley Lake	110 acres (45 ha)		Crawford County	
Wall Lake	557 acres (225 ha)		Barry County	
Walled Lake	670 acres (270 ha)	53 feet (16 m)	Oakland County	1615718
Walloon Lake	4,270 acres (1,730 ha)	100 feet (30 m)	Charlevoix and Emmet counties	1618952
Wamplers Lake	797 acres (323 ha)		Jackson County	
Ward Lake	6 acres (2.4 ha)		Shiawassee County	
Weidman Millpond			Isabella County	
Wegwaas Lake	148 acres (60 ha)		Chippewa County	
Welch Lake	112 acres (45 ha)		Jackson County	
West Branch Lake	148 acres (60 ha)		Alger County	
West Lake	335 acres (135.6 ha)	14 feet (4.3 m)	Kalamazoo County	
West Twin Lake	1,313 acres (531 ha)	26 feet (7.9 m)	Montmorency County	
White Lake	2,535 acres (1,026 ha)		Muskegon County	
White Lake	540 acres (220 ha)		Oakland County	1616316
Whitefish Lake	486 acres (197 ha)		Gogebic County	
Whitmore Lake	667 acres (270 ha)		Washtenaw and Livingston counties	
Wiggins Lake	294 acres (119 ha)		Gladwin County	
Wildwood Lakes	227 acres (92 ha)		Cheboygan County	
Wilkinson Lake	227 acres (92 ha)		Barry County	
Winslow Lake	259 acres (105 ha)		Iron County	
Lake Winyah	865 acres (350 ha)		Alpena County	
Wixom Lake	1,142 acres (462 ha)		Gladwin County	
Wolf Lake	389 acres (157 ha)		Gogebic County	
Wolf Lake	398 acres (161 ha)		Jackson County	
Wolf Lake	8 acres (3.2 ha)		Shiawassee County	
Wolverine Lake			Oakland County	
Worm Lake	640 acres (260 ha)	7 feet (2.1 m)	Baraga County	1616824
Woodhull Lake	135 acres (55 ha)	56 feet (17 m)	Oakland County	1616748
Woods Lake	15 acres (6.1 ha)		Shiawassee County	
Wycamp Lake	609 acres (246 ha)		Emmet County	1616854
Zukey Lake	155 acres (63 ha)	44 feet (13 m)	Livingston County	1616968

== See also ==
- List of lakes of Oakland County, Michigan
- List of lakes in the United States
- List of lakes of the United States by area

== General references ==
- "Michigan's Named Inland Lakes (5+ acres)" (PDF). Michigan Lake & Stream Associations. Michigan Department of Natural Resources and Environment. 2010.
