= Huron River chain of lakes =

Lake of the United States of America

The Huron river chain of lakes consists of an eight-mile (13 km) connection of nine lakes: Big Portage, Little Portage, Baseline, Zukey, Strawberry, Whitewood, Gallagher, Ore, and Tamarack Lake.

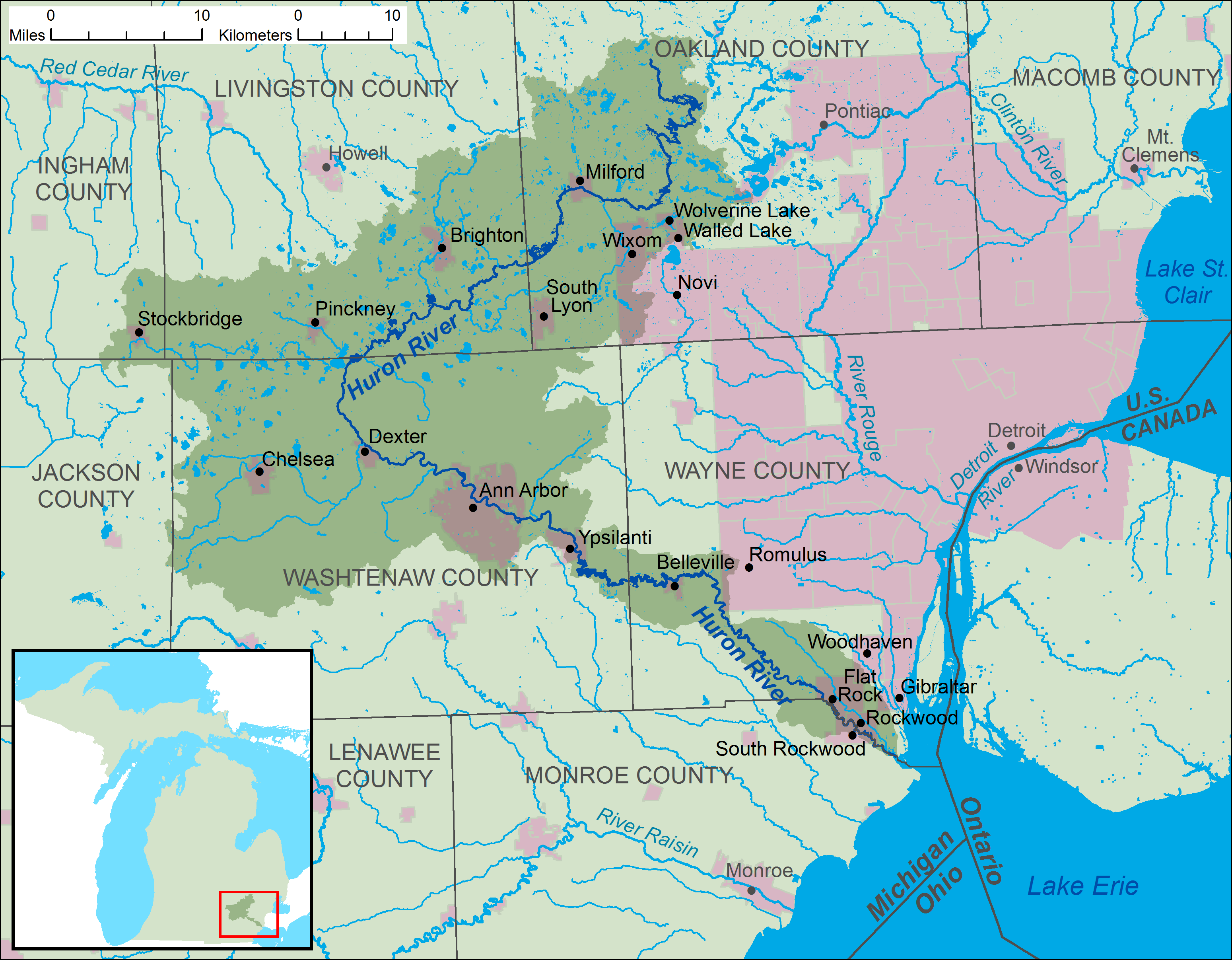
Map of the Huron River

== Geography ==
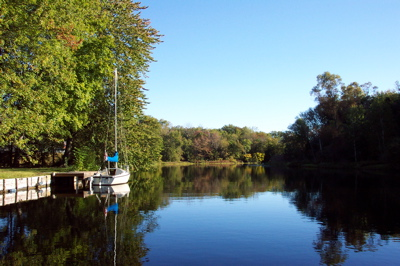
Huron River near Portage Lake

The chain is a watershed of the Huron River and covers northern Washtenaw County and southern Livingston County in Michigan. Big Portage, Little Portage, Base Line, Zukey, Strawberry, Whitewood and Gallagher can all be navigated by normal watercraft, however, Ore and Tamarack are only accessible by small watercraft. The lakes are connected by no-wake canals and are mainly navigated by order of Little Portage, Big Portage, Baseline, Whitewood, Gallagher, Strawberry, and Zukey. Big Portage is 680 acres (2.8 km^{2}) with the deepest point at 84 feet (26 m), making it the largest lake on the chain. Strawberry Lake is the second largest at 257 acres (1.04 km^{2}) with its deepest point at 64 feet (20 m).

== History ==
During the 18th century French fur traders traveled from Lake Erie to Big Portage by way of the Huron River.

== See also ==
- List of lakes in Michigan
