= Dockery Lake =

Dockery Lake may refer to:

- Dockery Lake Recreation Area, in Georgia
- Dockery Lake (Michigan), a lake in Michigan
