= Strawberry Lake =

Strawberry Lake may refer to:

- Strawberry Lake (Michigan)
- Strawberry Lake (Oregon)
- Strawberry Lake (Colorado), a lake where the Rainbow Family held their first gathering
- "Strawberry Lake", a song by the Original 7ven from Condensate

== See also ==
- Strawberry Reservoir, a reservoir in Utah
