= Corey Lake =

Lake in Michigan, United States

- Location within Michigan
- Location: St. Joseph / Cass counties, Michigan, United States
- Coordinates: 41°55′55″N 85°44′30″W
- Type: Natural Freshwater Lake
- Primary inflows: Harwood Lake (dammed)
- Primary outflows: Kaiser Lake (artificial), Curtis Creek (artificial)
- Basin countries: United States
- Surface area: 630 acres (250 ha)
- Max. depth: 73 ft (22 m)
- Residence time: 4.4 years
- Shore length^{1}: 7.06 miles (11.36 km)
- Surface elevation: 873 ft (266 m)
- Islands: 0
- ^{1} Shore length is not a well-defined measure.

Corey Lake is a small, inland lake in Southwestern Michigan located just outside Three Rivers, and is home to Camp Eberhart and Camp Wakeshma. The lake is lined with homes and a few restaurants that have views of the water. Recreational water sports such as boating, sailing, water skiing, and jetskiing are popular on the lake during the warmer seasons.

The lake is circular shaped, with North Bay and Turtle Bay sprouting from one side and Little Corey jutting out from another side. The vast majority of the lake is located in Fabius Township, St. Joseph County, although its westernmost reach extends into Newberg Township, Cass County. It is the second largest lake in St. Joseph County.

== History ==
The St. Joseph River Valley Region was covered under glacial ice until the Last Glacial Period, during which the ice retreated and the water left behind formed into the early Great Lakes as well as countless rivers, streams, and smaller kettle lakes likely including Corey. Indigenous people have long lived in the regions surrounding Corey Lake. The Belson Archeological site in nearby Leonidas Township contains clovis fragments dating to neary 13,000 years ago. The Potawatomi lived in this region of Southwest Michigan until being forcibly removed in the 1840s.

Corey Lake is said to be named after Joshua Corry, the first person to settle by the lake circa 1836. He died in 1888. It is unknown how the spelling came to be changed. Records from 1858 refer to it as Corey's Lake.

The lake has one inlet and two outlets, none of which are natural. In 1889, the state House of Representatives passed House bill No. 587, authorizing $600 (equivalent to $19,444 in 2025) for the purpose of clearing and widening the channel between Corey and Kaiser Lakes.

== Flora and Fauna ==
Corey Lake is a home to smallmouth bass, largemouth bass, walleye, rainbow trout, yellow perch, northern pike, and bluegill. Some fish species were introduced to the lake. The lake's fish were first surveyed by the State of Michigan in 1887.

Surrounding the lake are open oak woodlands. Other plants include milkweed, bluestem, and columbine. Grosbeaks, orioles, and warblers can be found in abundance.

== See also ==
- List of lakes of Michigan
