= Goose Lake Outlet Site =

Stream in Marquette County, Michigan

The Goose Lake Outlet Site is a stream of water located in Marquette County of Michigan, United States. This small lake outlet is also a part of the Lake Michigan drainage system, otherwise known as the Escanaba River System. The archaeological site was once traveled through by the Paleoindian people of the Americas, as identified through the traces of tools and materials left behind. Although there is limited proof of past historical sites in this location, certain excavations performed indeed show an existence of activity along the site. The extraction of Glass Beads on Goose Lake Outlet Site #3 is an example that points to the significance this artifact had in exhibiting the protohistoric trade and culture between the Europeans that existed within this location.

== Background ==
The Goose Lake Outlet of Marquette County, Michigan is the only stream of water that exits Goose Lake. While there are minimal cultural sites present on the Goose Lake Outlet, traces of Paleoindian travel is documented. Specifically, the Paleoindian people of the Americas left their mark in their journeys along the Upper Michigan Peninsula for copper mining during the Late Archaic period (3000 BC-1000 BC). They utilized the copper pieces by cold hammering them into tools for hunting, fishing, and woodworking.

The Eastern Branch of the Escanaba River System, where the lake outlet is located, is progressive in its preservation of certain marine life. The warmer temperatures occupying the first 2–3 miles of Goose Lake Outlet's upper stream nurtures a copious amount of trout. The lower-end of the lake outlet contains plentiful amounts of brook, brown, and rainbow trout.

== Geography ==
The Goose Lake Outlet is more specifically located in the Upper-Peninsula of Marquette County, Michigan. It is about 7 miles adjacent to Lake Superior. The stream site is measured as approximately being 40 feet wide and 2 ft at its deepest. The stream flows about 6.5 miles south in one direction towards the Eastern side of the Escanaba River System. This site has been established as a resource of indigenous wildlife and aquatic life.

== Excavation of glass beads and its significance ==
Dr. Marla Buckmaster and Dr. John Anderton of Northern Michigan University collaborated with avocational archaeologist James Paquette and with volunteers on the excavation of Goose Lake Outlet Site #3 (GLO#3). Paquette, Buckmaster and Anderton selected the Goose Lake Outlet in hopes of further investigating and understanding the cultural prehistoric and early historic materials within the area. From 2012 to 2013, the archaeologists conducted their excavations and discovered artifacts which included lithic assemblages of four triangular projectile points, two chert bifaces, chert and quartzite flakes, and tiny amounts of chert, quartz, and quartzite chipping debris. Additionally, one grooved stone maul, several hammerstones, and fire-cracked rocks made of granites and Kona dolomite were recovered. Faunal bone fragments identified as being mostly moose remains were also discovered. From the artifacts recovered, the archeologists found evidence to support the idea of the Goose Lake Outlet being a short-term place of stay for inhabitants to safely reside in and take advantage of its wildlife as they tried to survive harsh winter months.

The hand-made European items found along the site include 5 brass Jesuit finger rings, iron scissors, fragments of an iron knife-tip and kettle metal, a small strip of brass, a piece of hammered copper, and 46 glass trade beads. From the glass bead assemblages excavated, Paquette and bead researcher Dr. Heather Walder were equipped with suitable evidence that the artifact contributes to investigations of existing early to mid seventeenth-century A.D. trading networks and movements of a growing population in the Midwest. The beads correlate with the location of the Goose Lake Outlet being within the early fur trading sphere of New France in the Northeast and Great Lakes region.
