= Arcadia Lake =

Arcadia Lake may refer to:

- Arcadia Lake (Oklahoma), a lake in Oklahoma County, Oklahoma, USA
- Arcadia Lake (Michigan), a lake in Manistee County, Michigan, USA

== See also ==
- Arcadia Lakes, South Carolina, a town
