= Gravel Lake (Michigan) =

Lake in the state of Michigan, United States

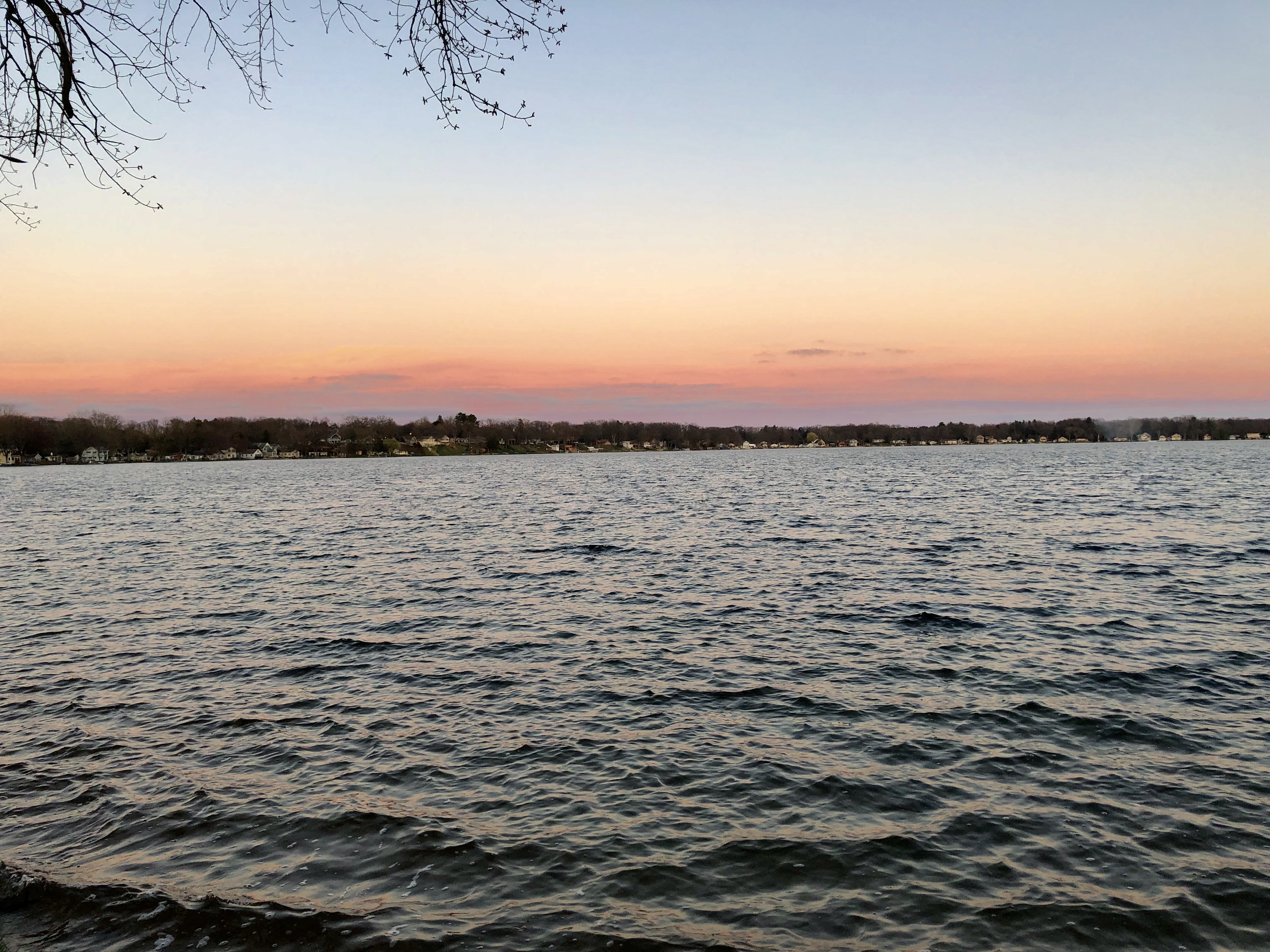
- Sunset on Gravel Lake

- Location within Michigan
- Location: Van Buren County, Michigan
- Coordinates: 42°04′36″N 085°52′02″W
- Basin countries: United States
- Surface area: 296 acres (120 ha)
- Max. depth: 51 ft (16 m)
- Surface elevation: 879 feet (268 m)

Gravel Lake is a 296-acre (1.20 km^{2}) freshwater lake in the southeast corner of Porter Township near the southern boundary of Van Buren County in the U.S. state of Michigan. The lake is located between Lawton and Marcellus. The lake is controlled and managed by a homeowners association, the Gravel Lake Association.

Located in the southwestern part of the state, the lake is spring fed and has an outlet (spillway) on Idle Ease beach which feeds Saddlebag Lake (and Big Fish Lake) and an inlet from a swamp named Strawberry Lake just behind the northern end of Idle Ease Beach.

Gravel Lake is popular for fishing in the area and the lake contains northern pike, largemouth & smallmouth bass, bluegill, yellow perch, bullhead, white sucker, bowfin, black crappie, and some walleye.

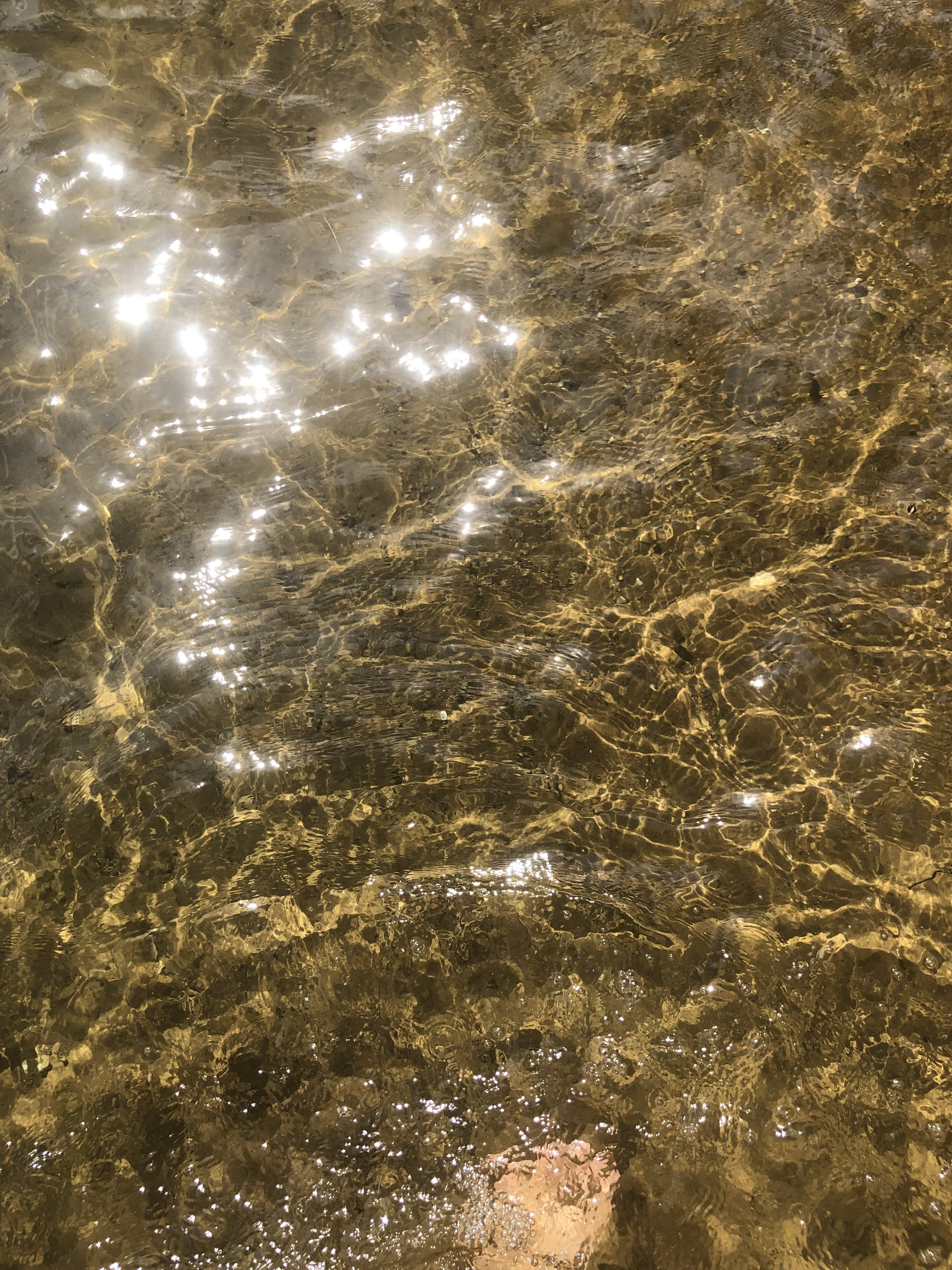
Clear and Clean water at Gravel Lake

This lake also has a strong bond amongst its residents and many traditions take place every year. Memorial Day Weekend and Labor Day Weekend host many activities, but the most popular is Fourth of July. The Gravel Lake Association sponsors The Paddle Boat Regatta, The 2 Mile Fun Run/Walk, The Boat Parade, and The Kids' Games.

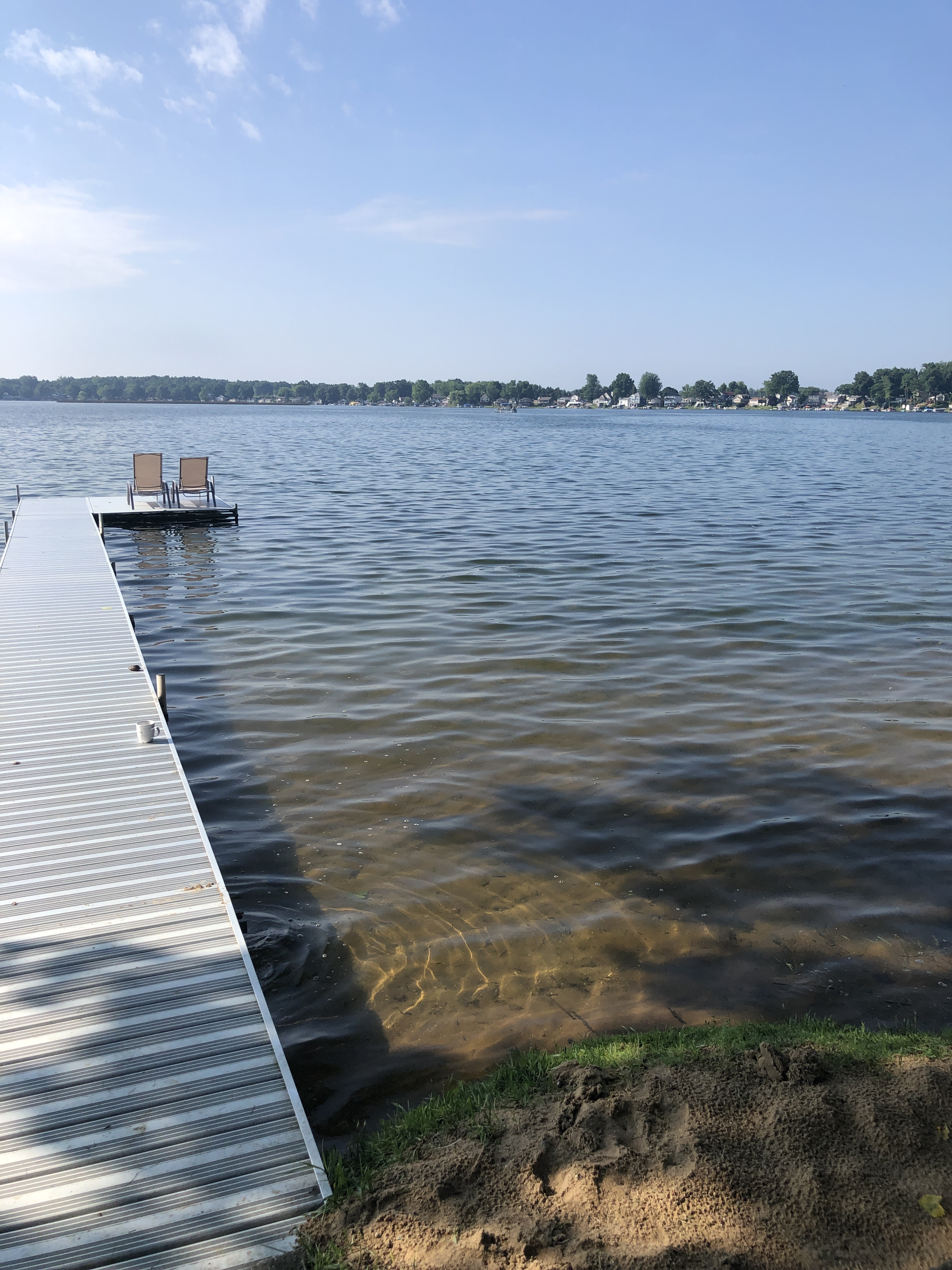
Sandy Bottom 300 Acre Lake

== See also ==
- List of lakes in Michigan
