= Clear Lake (Michigan) =

Lakes in the state of Michigan, United States

Clear Lake is the name of several lakes in the U.S. state of Michigan:

Name	GNIS ID	County*	State	Coord	Elevation
Clear Bottom Lake	623398	Kent	MI	43°06′45″N 85°37′40″W	722 feet (220 m)
Clear Lake	623409	Calhoun	MI	42°23′21″N 85°05′30″W	853 feet (260 m)
Clear Lake	623432	Montmorency	MI	45°07′29″N 84°10′49″W	869 feet (265 m)
Clear Lake	623423	Crawford	MI	44°48′34″N 84°35′08″W	1,204 feet (367 m)
Clear Lake	623428	Baraga	MI	46°41′30″N 88°01′23″W	1,749 feet (533 m)
Clear Lake	619759	Alcona	MI	44°37′30″N 83°44′51″W	932 feet (284 m)
Clear Lake	1618896	Berrien	MI	41°49′57″N 86°25′17″W	725 feet (221 m)
Clear Lake	623411	Allegan	MI	42°26′26″N 86°01′51″W	673 feet (205 m)
Clear Lake	623427	Baraga	MI	46°38′51″N 88°15′34″W	1,795 feet (547 m)
Clear Lake	623426	Chippewa	MI	45°58′11″N 83°32′20″W	696 feet (212 m)
Clear Lake	623424	Otsego	MI	44°55′12″N 84°28′37″W	1,230 feet (370 m)
Clear Lake	1619525	Muskegon	MI	43°21′00″N 86°05′23″W	640 feet (200 m)
Clear Lake	623420	Roscommon	MI	44°13′48″N 84°29′18″W	1,171 feet (357 m)
Clear Lake	623419	Ogemaw	MI	44°13′13″N 83°59′46″W	846 feet (258 m)
Clear Lake	623422	Ogemaw	MI	44°24′19″N 84°17′03″W	1,260 feet (380 m)
Clear Lake	623408	Jackson	MI	42°19′54″N 84°08′54″W	968 feet (295 m)
Clear Lake	623416	Mecosta	MI	43°29′39″N 85°09′46″W	968 feet (295 m)
Clear Lake	623417	Mecosta	MI	43°40′44″N 85°23′37″W	1,063 feet (324 m)
Clear Lake	1624458	St. Joseph	MI	41°56′50″N 85°43′54″W	873 feet (266 m)
Clear Lake	623433	Schoolcraft	MI	45°58′15″N 86°00′19″W	623 feet (190 m)
Clear Lake	623415	Kent	MI	43°15′20″N 85°40′10″W	784 feet (239 m)
Clear Lake	623431	Lapeer	MI	43°08′25″N 83°07′16″W	827 feet (252 m)
Clear Lake	1619526	Schoolcraft	MI	46°14′50″N 86°25′18″W	771 feet (235 m)
Clear Lake	623429	Houghton	MI	46°50′14″N 88°52′20″W	1,201 feet (366 m)
Clear Lake	623414	Montcalm	MI	43°07′40″N 85°06′34″W	814 feet (248 m)
Clear Lake	623418	Clare	MI	43°53′37″N 84°56′29″W	1,099 feet (335 m)
Clear Lake	623421	Missaukee	MI	44°21′20″N 85°18′26″W	1,293 feet (394 m)
Clear Lake	623430	Keweenaw	MI	47°25′24″N 88°02′07″W	1,001 feet (305 m)
Clear Lake	1619527	Iron	MI	46°22′10″N 88°57′04″W	1,608 feet (490 m)
Clear Lake	623413	Oakland	MI	42°48′48″N 83°17′39″W	1,017 feet (310 m)
Clear Lake	623412	Barry	MI	42°30′35″N 85°16′10″W	945 feet (288 m)
Clear Lake	1619528	Gogebic	MI	46°14′55″N 89°16′16″W	1,716 feet (523 m)
Clear Lake	623425	Presque Isle	MI	45°31′25″N 84°08′50″W	620 feet (190 m)
Clear Lake	623410	Van Buren	MI	42°24′40″N 85°49′03″W	732 feet (223 m)
Jingle Lake	1620366	Iron	MI	46°23′50″N 88°43′58″W	1,519 feet (463 m)
Reynolds Lake	1621377	Gogebic	MI	46°15′18″N 89°39′53″W	1,673 feet (510 m)
South Clear Lake	1624942	Berrien	MI	41°45′31″N 86°22′38″W	755 feet (230 m)
Verdant Lake	1622020	Schoolcraft	MI	46°10′39″N 86°32′52″W	764 feet (233 m)

*Note on lakes that span more than one county: The county column only shows the first county returned by GNIS in this column.
