= Gun Creek =

Gun Creek is the name of several watercourses and associated placenames in Canada and the United States.

== Canada ==
- Gun Creek (British Columbia), a tributary of the Bridge River in southern British Columbia
- Gun Creek (Nahlin River), a tributary of the Nahlin River in northwestern British Columbia

== United States ==
- Gun Creek (Arizona), a stream in Gila County, Arizona
  - Gun Creek Corral
- Gun Creek (Idaho), a stream in Valley County, Idaho
- Gun Creek (Illinois), a stream in Franklin County, Illinois
  - Gun Creek Public Use Area, a public use re in Franklin County, Illinois
- Gun Creek (Indiana), a stream in Clay County, Indiana
- Gun Creek (Kentucky), a stream in Magoffin County, Kentucky
  - Gun Creek, Kentucky, a former populated place in Magoffin Country, Kentucky
- Gun Creek (Missouri), a stream in Randolph County, Missouri
- Gun Creek (New York), a stream in Erie County, New York state
- Gun Creek (Oregon), a stream in Marion County, Oregon
- American Fork, Utah in Utah County, Utah, is also known as Gun Creek

== See also ==
- Gunn Creek, a stream in Valdez-Cordova census area, Alaska
- Gunn Valley, a valley in the Chilcotin region of British Columbia
- Gun Lake (disambiguation)
