= Fumee Lake =

Lake in the state of Michigan, United States

- Location within Michigan Location within the United States
- Location: Dickinson County, Michigan
- Coordinates: 45°49′35″N 87°58′29″W
- Type: Lake
- Basin countries: United States
- Surface elevation: 1,073 feet (327 m)

Fumee Lake is a lake in Dickinson County, Michigan, in the United States.

Fumee Lake was named by a French explorer after Fumay, in France.

== See also ==
- List of lakes in Michigan
