= Austin Lake =

Lake in the state of Michigan, United States

- Location within Michigan
- Location: Kalamazoo County, Michigan
- Coordinates: 42°10′25″N 85°33′07″W
- Basin countries: United States
- Surface area: 1,090 acres (4.4 km^{2})
- Average depth: 5 feet (1.5 m)
- Max. depth: 11 ft (3.4 m)
- Surface elevation: 853 feet (260 m)

Austin Lake is a lake located in Kalamazoo County in the U.S. state of Michigan. It is approximately 2.2 miles (3.5 km) long at its greatest length. It has an average depth of about 5 feet (1.5 m), with a maximum depth of just over 11 feet (3.4 m). A boat launch is provided with a (U.S.) $6 daily fee. All watercraft are allowed. No alcoholic beverages are allowed.

== See also ==
- List of lakes in Michigan
