= Lake Antoine =

Lake in Dickinson County, Michigan, United States of America

- Location within Michigan Location within the United States
- Location: Dickinson County, Michigan
- Coordinates: 45°50′14″N 88°01′56″W
- Type: Lake
- Basin countries: United States
- Surface area: 748 acres (303 ha)
- Surface elevation: 1,155 ft (352 m)

Lake Antoine is a lake in Dickinson County, Michigan, United States.

It was named for Antoine Le Beau, a French fur trader who settled at the lake shore.

== See also ==
- List of lakes in Michigan
