= Bankson Lake =

Lake in the state of Michigan, United States

- Location within Michigan Location within the United States
- Location: Van Buren County, Michigan, United States of America
- Coordinates: 42°07′20″N 85°47′47″W
- Type: lake
- Basin countries: United States
- Surface area: 217 acres (0.88 km^{2})
- Max. depth: 42 ft (13 m)
- Surface elevation: 892 ft (272 m)

Bankson Lake is a 217-acre (0.88 km^{2}) all-sports lake located in Van Buren County, just south of Lawton, Michigan. The lake is unique in that it has rather undeveloped shores and is home to two large camps - the Miracle Camp and Retreat Center and the Girl Scouts. Miracle Camp and Retreat Center has existed on the lake since 1965 and provides summer camps, weekend retreats, winter retreats, and other Christian camping for more than 12,000 people each year.

Bankson Lake has a depth of up to 42 feet (13 m) and is well stocked with sport fish, including walleye and Muskies. There is a good population of native purebred Muskies as well. It has been one of Southwest Michigan's premier source lakes for Female musky eggs, which are then crossed with northern pike milt to produce hybrid Tiger Muskies.

As with other spring-fed lakes in the area, its depth is water-table dependent. It has had historical lows in the late 1940s that left a sandbar toward the eastern end completely dry. Cottages were built around that time, that later flooded as the lake level rose. There is at least one remaining visible foundation at the northern end of this bar that had 3 feet of water over it as of 2009. The water level has been high enough in the 1950s to permit the use of "float-in" boat houses, a few of which remain around the lake though they are now dry.

Bankson Lake is governed by the Bankson Lake Association

== See also ==
- List of lakes in Michigan
