= Lamberton Lake =

Lake in the state of Michigan, United States

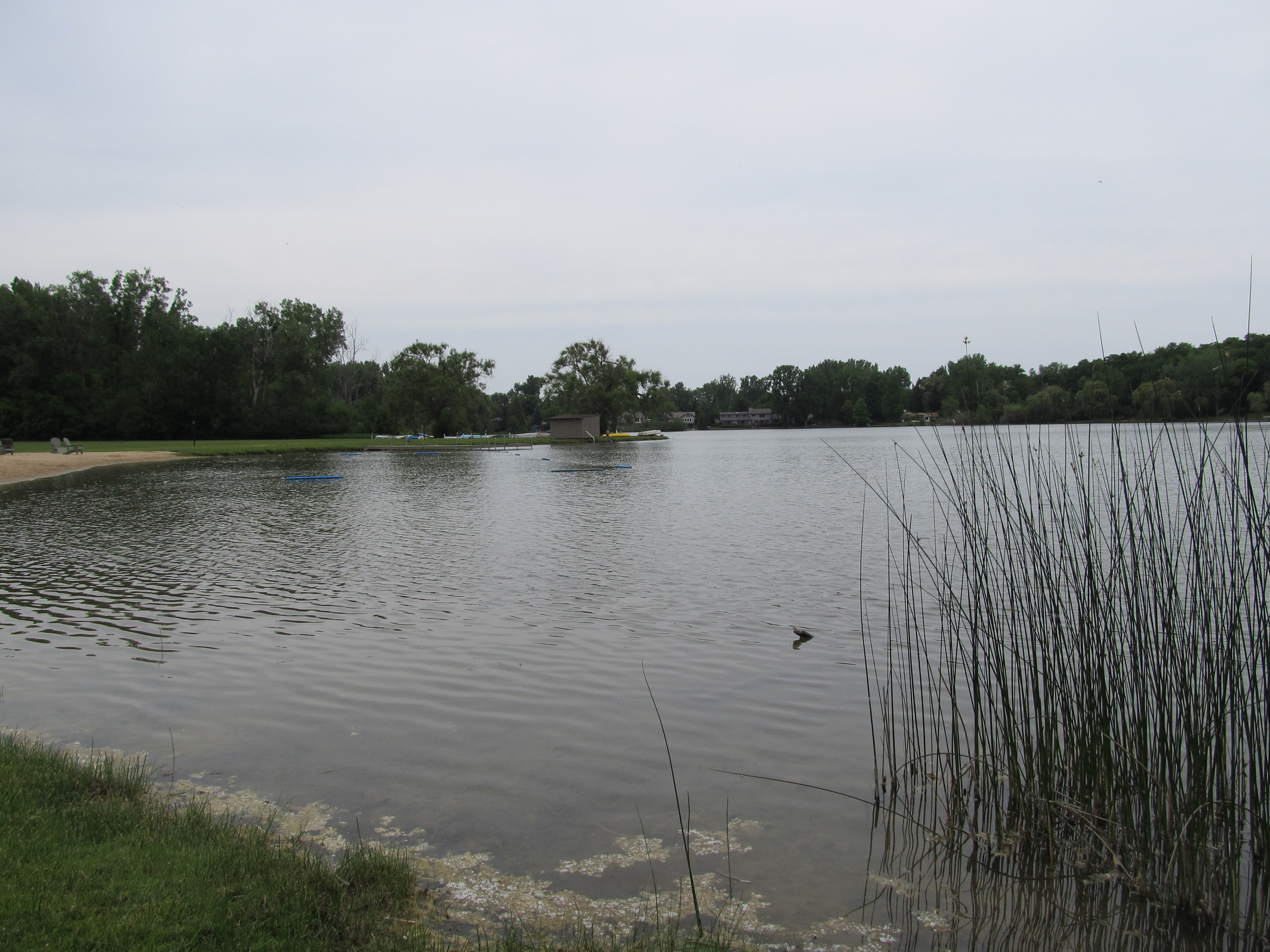

- Location within Michigan
- Location: Kent County, Michigan
- Coordinates: 43.02°N 85.63°W
- Primary inflows: Lamberton Creek
- Primary outflows: Lamberton Creek
- Basin countries: United States
- Max. length: appx. 1,700 ft (520 m)
- Max. width: appx. 1,040 ft (320 m)
- Surface area: 28.5 acres (115,000 m^{2})
- Max. depth: 15 ft (4.6 m)
- Surface elevation: 656 ft (200 m)
- Settlements: Grand Rapids

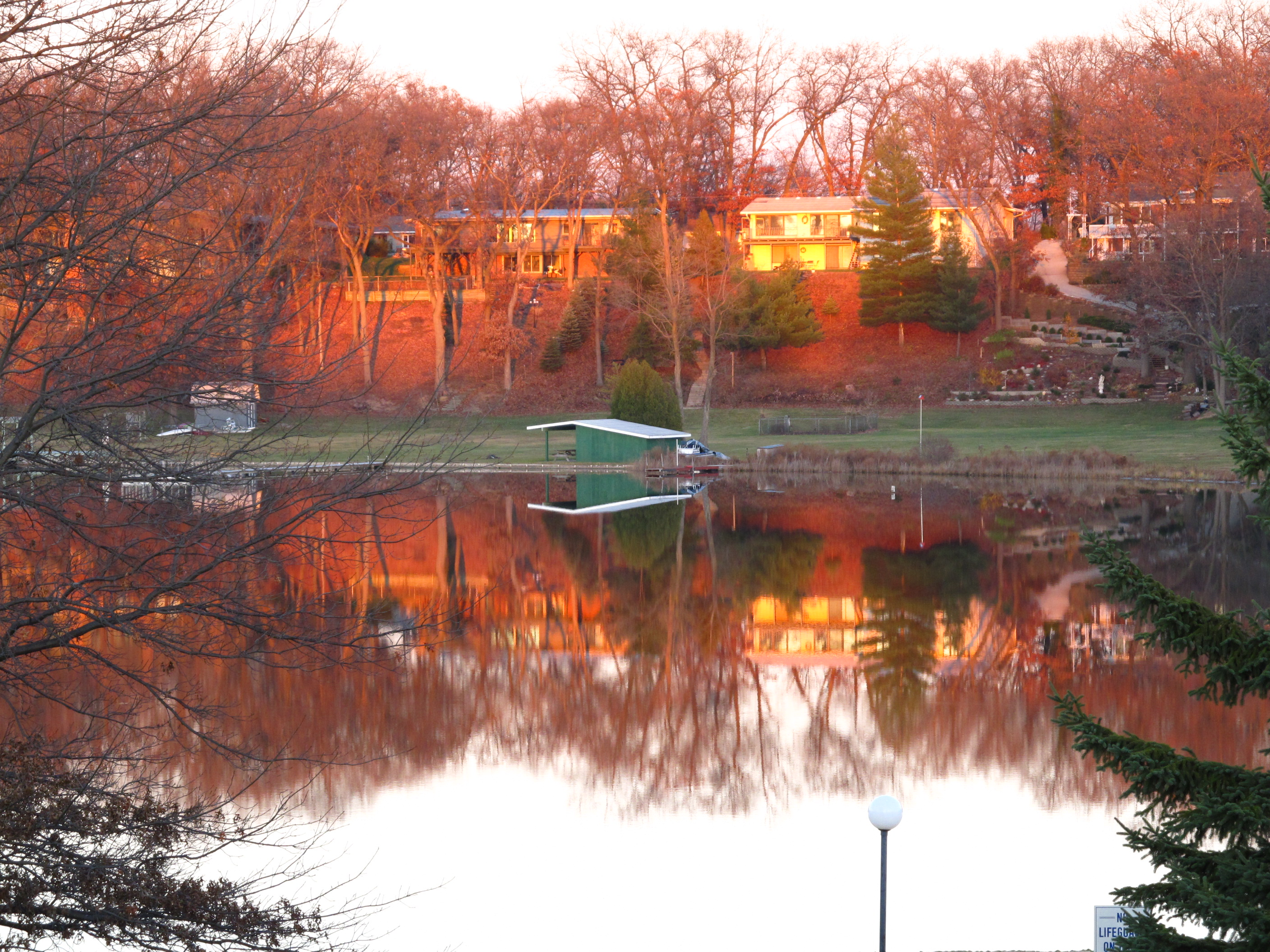
Lamberton Lake, Grand Rapids, Michigan. Photo shows nearby topography in autumn.

Lamberton Lake is a 28.5-acre (115,000 m^{2}) freshwater lake located in Kent County in Western Michigan. The lake is approximately 1,700 feet (520 m) long and 1,040 feet (320 m) wide and is centered at 43.02°N 85.63°W just within the city limits in northeast Grand Rapids. The surface elevation is 650 feet (200 m), and most of the lake is less than 15 feet (4.6 m) deep. There is one island in the lake, approximately 160 feet (49 m) long and 70 feet (21 m) wide, located in the northwest part of the lake. A low ridge runs along the east side of the lake and overlooks it.

== Hydrology ==
Lamberton Lake is fed by Lamberton Creek, which flows from Emerald Lake to Lamberton Lake, entering the lake at the northeast. Two springs also feed the lake. Lamberton Lake discharges into Lamberton Creek at the southeast. Lamberton Creek flows south, then turns west and eventually flows into the Grand River.

== Natural environment ==
Most of the lake bottom is composed of marl; the deeper parts are mostly composed of pulpy peat.

Located both to the northwest and southeast of the lake in two parcels sits the 24 acre Lamberton Lake Fen Nature Preserve, managed by the Land Conservancy of West Michigan. Established in 1994, it was expanded ten years later. Lamberton Creek flows from the lake through the preserve's southeast parcel, where the fen is located. The fen is home to many native plant and animal species.

The wetlands around the lake were more extensive in the past. However, already by 1901 much of this area had been reclaimed. This was due to a lower lake level caused by the deepening of the creek.

== History ==
In the late nineteenth century Lamberton Lake with Lamberton Creek was under consideration as one of several possible sources for the water supply of the growing city of Grand Rapids.

== See also ==
- List of lakes in Michigan
