= Betsy Lake (Luce County, Michigan) =

Lake in the state of Michigan, United States

- Location within Michigan
- Location: Luce County, Michigan
- Coordinates: 46°37′28″N 085°16′28″W
- Type: lake
- Basin countries: United States
- Surface area: 1,376 acres (5.6 km^{2})
- Surface elevation: 712 feet (217 m)

Betsy Lake is a lake located in Luce County in the U.S. state of Michigan.

== See also ==
- List of lakes in Michigan
