= Lake Gribben =

Lake in the state of Michigan, United States

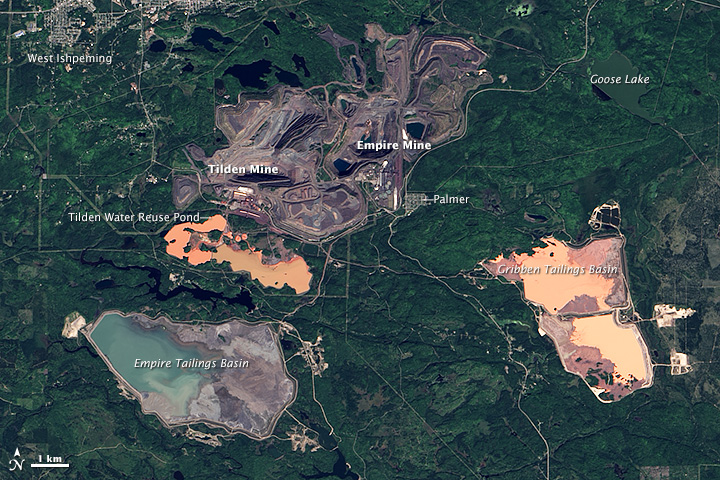
- Lake Gribben is on the far right, 2013 (Landsat 8 photo)

- Location within Michigan
- Location: Palmer, Marquette County, Michigan, United States
- Coordinates: 46°25′07″N 87°32′19″W
- Type: Lake
- Basin countries: United States
- Max. length: 3 mi (4.8 km)
- Max. width: 1.5 mi (2.4 km)
- Surface elevation: 1,211 feet (369 m)

Lake Gribben is a lake in the U.S. state of Michigan, located one mile (1.6 km) southeast of the unincorporated community of Palmer. The lake exhibits a distinct orange hue due to its use as a tailings basin in association with open-pit mining operations of the Empire and Tilden iron mines.

== See also ==
- List of lakes in Michigan
- Water pollution in the United States
