= Moss Lake (Delta County, Michigan) =

Lake in the state of Michigan, United States

- Location within Michigan Location within the United States
- Location: Delta County, Michigan
- Coordinates: 45°54′04″N 86°40′01″W
- Type: Lake
- Primary outflows: Bull Run Creek
- Basin countries: United States
- Surface area: 1,080 acres (4 km^{2})
- Max. depth: 5 ft (2 m)
- Surface elevation: 610 ft (186 m)

Moss Lake is a small lake in Delta County, Michigan.

== See also ==
- List of lakes in Michigan
