= Lake Lavine (Michigan) =

Lake in Branch County, Michigan, United States of America

- Location within Michigan
- Location: Kinderhook Township, Branch County, Michigan
- Coordinates: 41°46′05″N 85°02′15″W
- Type: Lake
- Basin countries: United States
- Surface area: 87 acres (35 ha)
- Surface elevation: 981 ft (299 m)

Lake Lavine is a small lake, 87 acres (350,000 m^{2}), in south central Michigan. Located in Kinderhook Township, Branch County, Michigan approximately 3 miles (4.8 km) from Kinderhook, Lake Lavine is situated approximately 0.5 miles (0.80 km) north of the Indiana state line: 3 miles (4.8 km) directly north of the Lake James chain of lakes located in Indiana.

Lake Lavine is a deep lake (84 feet maximum) with steep drop-offs. Speed boats are allowed during the hours of 10:00 am until 6:30 pm. On the southeastern shore there is a state-operated public fishing site with a paved boat ramp. The terrain surrounding Lake Lavine is gently rolling woodlands, wetlands, farm fields, and vineyards. Approximately half of the shoreline is developed, with about 60 summer and permanent homes on the lake. The remaining shoreline is wetlands and undeveloped woodland. The lake is primarily groundwater seepage fed, without any significant inlet and no outlet. Lake Lavine is within the headwaters of the Prairie River watershed. The Prairie River (Michigan) flows westerly, joining the St. Joseph River just south of the community of Three Rivers. Almost half of the lakeshore is privately owned wetlands with no immediate plans for development.

Known for its exceptional fishing, Lake Lavine holds significant numbers of perch, bass, bluegill and crappie. It was formally stocked by MDNR with rainbow trout. This was stopped in 2009 after illegal release of northern pike diminished the native habitat.

== See also ==
- List of lakes in Michigan
