= Gilletts Lake =

Lake in the state of Michigan, United States

- Location within Michigan
- Location: Jackson County, Michigan
- Coordinates: 42°15′48″N 84°18′47″W
- Basin countries: United States
- Surface area: 350 acres (1.4 km^{2})
- Max. depth: 30 ft (9.1 m)
- Surface elevation: 955 feet (291 m)

Gilletts Lake is a lake located in Jackson County in the U.S. state of Michigan. It is approximately 1.2 miles (1.9 km) long at its greatest length. It has an average depth of about 5 feet (1.5 m), with a maximum depth of just over 30 feet (9.1 m). Persons looking to fish in Gillets Lake should know that expected catches include Bluegill, Channel Catfish, Largemouth Bass, Northern Pike, Rock Bass, Bowfin, Bullhead Smallmouth Bass, Walleye, and Yellow Perch.

== See also ==
- List of lakes in Michigan
