= Murphy Lake (Berrien County, Michigan) =

Lake in the state of Michigan, United States

- Location within Michigan
- Location: Berrien County, Michigan
- Coordinates: 41°56′39″N 86°15′29″W
- Basin countries: United States
- Surface area: 5.481 acres (2.218 ha)
- Surface elevation: 735 ft (224 m)

Murphy Lake is a lake in Berrien County, Michigan, United States. Murphy Lake lies at an elevation of 735 feet (224 m) and has a size of 5.481 acres (2.218 ha).

The lake has the name of Isaac Murphy, a pioneer who settled at the lake in 1833.

== See also ==
- List of lakes in Michigan
