= Murray Lake (Michigan) =

Lake in the state of Michigan, United States

- Location within Michigan Location within the United States
- Location: Kent County, Michigan
- Coordinates: 43°02′27″N 85°22′48″W
- Type: Lake
- Primary outflows: Murray Lake Creek
- Basin countries: United States
- Surface area: 320 acres (130 ha)
- Max. depth: 72 ft (22 m)
- Surface elevation: 810 ft (250 m)

Murray Lake is a naturally formed lake about 7 miles (11 km) away from the town of Lowell, Michigan. Murray Lake is the third largest lake in Kent County, lying in the northeast corner of the county. The lake north of 4 Mile Road is in Grattan Township. South of 4 Mile is Vergennes Township.

== Lake Description ==
Located in Section 33, Town 8 North, Range 9 West, and Section 4, Town 6 North Range 9 West, the lake is shown on the original surveys done by the Government Land Office in 1837. While it is rumored that the peninsula was once an island, it is shown as a peninsula on the 1837 surveys.

A man by the name of John Murray farmed around the lake. The lake is named in his honor.

The lake is a popular fishing and recreational destination. There are two boat launches on Causeway Drive.

Fishing is good year round with healthy populations of Largemouth Bass, Yellow Perch, Bluegill, Pumpkinseed, Cisco, Northern Pike, Bowfin, and Muskellunge.

The Murray Lake Association sponsors events such as the annual chili cook-off, 4th of July boat parade and Christmas decorating contest. Murray Lake Elementary was opened in 2004, being only a 1/2 mile from the lake.

== See also ==
- List of lakes in Michigan
