= Gun Lake =

Gun Lake may refer to:

- Gun Lake (Michigan), in Barry and Allegan counties
- Gun Lake (Mason County, Michigan)
- Gun Lake (British Columbia), Canada, also known as Big Gun Lake and formerly spelled Gunn Lake.
- Lajoie Lake, near Gun Lake, British Columbia, is also known as Little Gun Lake. The two together are referred to as the Gun Lakes.
