= Murphy Lake (Tuscola County, Michigan) =

Lake in the state of Michigan, United States

- Location within Michigan
- Location: Tuscola County, Michigan
- Coordinates: 43°18′00″N 83°27′42″W
- Type: reservoir, natural lake
- Primary inflows: Goodings Creek
- Primary outflows: Goodings Creek
- Basin countries: United States
- Surface area: 209 acres (85 ha)
- Surface elevation: 741 ft (226 m)
- Islands: 3 small islands

Murphy Lake is a lake in Tuscola County, Michigan, United States. Murphy Lake lies at an elevation of 748 feet (228 m).

== See also ==
- List of lakes in Michigan
