= Lime Lake (Michigan) =

Lake in Leelanau County, Michigan, USA

- Location within Michigan Location within the United States
- Location: Leelanau County, Michigan
- Coordinates: 44°53′38″N 85°50′29″W
- Type: Freshwater lake
- Primary inflows: Lime Creek
- Primary outflows: Shetland Creek
- Basin countries: United States
- Max. length: 1.6 mi (2.6 km)
- Max. width: 1.1 mi (1.8 km)
- Surface area: 670 acres (2.7 km^{2})
- Max. depth: 65 ft (20 m)
- Surface elevation: 614 ft (187 m)
- Settlements: Maple City, Cedar

Lime Lake is a freshwater lake located in Cleveland Township, Leelanau County, Michigan, approximately two miles north of the Village of Maple City, Michigan.

The lake is located in a basin setting of wooded rolling sand hills approximately 3 miles (4.8 km) south of Good Harbor Bay and the Sleeping Bear Dunes National Lakeshore. The M-22, a State of Michigan scenic heritage route, skirts Lime Lake to the north.

== Description ==
The lake is approximately 1.6 miles (2.6 km) long, from south to north, and 1.1 miles (1.8 km) wide, from east to west, and 65 feet (20 m) at its deepest. It covers 670 acres (270 ha).

Lime Lake is part of the Good Harbor Bay watershed. In addition to a number of small creeks and springs, it is fed by Lime Creek at the southwestern corner of the lake. Shetland Creek flows out of the north end of the lake and into Little Traverse Lake, and from there Shalda Creek flows out of Little Traverse Lake and into Good Harbor Bay on Lake Michigan.

Migratory fish from Lake Michigan have access to Lime Lake through this connection when there are no beaver dams or other natural obstructions. Chinook salmon have been observed spawning in Lime Creek.

Lime Lake has a healthy fish community with abundant species diversity including brown trout, largemouth bass, northern pike, and smallmouth bass.

The south and north ends of the lake feature lowland swamps dominated by cedar, hemlock, and birch trees. Rolling hillsides to the east and west feature upland hardwoods and conifers.

Teichner Preserve, a 41-acre (17 ha) parcel located on the northeast shore of the lake, was gifted to the Leelanau Conservancy in 1996. Open to the public, a trail and boardwalk lead through extensive wetlands and forested lowlands to the lake shore.

The Lime Lake Association is the riparian association representing property owners on Lime Lake.

== Lumber-era history ==
In the late 19th century the lumber industry dominated the area. The Lime Lake Lumber Company mill was constructed around 1880. Timber harvested from the surrounding land was cut at the mill, and then hauled down a 3-mile plank road to Good Harbor Bay for shipping. The northeastern corner of the lake has some slabwood remnants easily visible on the shallow bottom.

== Geological history ==
Lime Lake is a glacial lake, formed by natural and geologic forces.

With the re-treat of the Laurentian Glacier, approximately 11,000 BP (before present), and the ice burden gone, the Earth’s crust in the northern part of the region began to rise. Over time the shoreline of the proglacial Lake Algonquin Lake Algonquin evolved with long peninsulas and bays becoming truncated from the main body lake to form separate lakes.

At Good Harbor Bay, Lime Lake as well as neighboring Bass and School lakes, all at an elevation of 620 feet (190 m), were closed off early during the Lake Algonquin stage (about 7,000 years ago). During the Lake Nipissing stage (about 6,000 to 4,000 years ago), a crescent-shaped belt of dunes closed off Little Traverse Lake.

== See also ==
- List of lakes in Michigan
