= Little Pleasant Lake =

Lake in St. Joseph County, Michigan, United States

Coordinates: 41°57′6″N 85°41′40″W

Little Pleasant Lake is a 29-acre lake located near Three Rivers in the Michigan county of St. Joseph. The lake was mapped for fishery purposes by the Michigan Conservation Department, the predecessor agency of the Michigan Department of Natural Resources (MDNR) in 1954. The mapmakers found a lake bottom of muck and pulpy peat, with marl in the shallows, and some sandy beaches. Little Pleasant Lake is fed by a creek that runs from Pleasant Lake into the smaller lake, and discharges into the Rocky River. The lake is 3 miles (5 km) west of Three Rivers.
