= Rennie Lake =

Lake in the state of Michigan, United States

- Location within Michigan
- Location: Grand Traverse County, Michigan
- Coordinates: 44°40′05″N 085°28′04″W
- Type: Lake
- Basin countries: United States
- Surface area: 238 acres (96 ha)
- Max. depth: 27 ft (8.2 m)
- Surface elevation: 860 ft (260 m)

Rennie Lake is an all-sports lake 13 miles (21 km) southeast of Traverse City, Michigan, United States.

== See also ==
- List of lakes in Michigan
- Grand Traverse County, Michigan
