= Klutes Lakes =

- Location within Michigan Location within the United States
- Location: Berrien County, Michigan
- Group: yes
- Coordinates: 41°46′08″N 86°35′42″W
- Type: Group of lakes

Klutes Lakes are a pair of lakes in Berrien County, in the U.S. state of Michigan. The lake is 7.248 acres (2.933 ha) in area.

Klutes Lakes was named after an original owner of the site.

== See also ==
- List of lakes of Michigan
