= Mandon Lake =

Lake in the state of Michigan, United States

- Location within Michigan
- Location: White Lake Township, Michigan
- Coordinates: 42°37′25″N 83°28′15″W
- Basin countries: United States
- Surface area: 26 acres (11 ha)
- Surface elevation: 935 feet (285 m)

Mandon Lake is a 26-acre (110,000 m^{2}) lake located in White Lake Township of Oakland County in the U.S. state of Michigan. The geographic coordinates are 42°37′25″N 83°28′15″W

The lake is affectionately known as the "Mighty Mandon", because despite its small size all sports are permitted.

== See also ==
- List of lakes in Michigan
