= Goose Lake (Marquette County, Michigan) =

Lake in the state of Michigan, United States

- Location within Michigan
- Location: Marquette County, Michigan
- Coordinates: 46°28′13″N 87°31′13″W
- Type: Lake
- Basin countries: United States
- Surface elevation: 1,217 feet (371 m)

Goose Lake is a lake in Marquette County, Michigan, in the United States. Goose Lake is so named because its outline resembles a goose in flight.

== See also ==
- List of lakes in Michigan
