= Boyle Lake =

- Location within Michigan
- Location: Berrien County
- Coordinates: 41°52′46″N 86°27′18″W
- Type: lake
- Surface area: 24.575 acres (9.945 ha)
- Surface elevation: 673 feet (205 m)

Boyle Lake is a lake in Berrien County, in the U.S. state of Michigan.

Boyle Lake has the name of George Boyle, an early settler. It has a size of 24.575 acres (9.945 ha).
