= South Clear Lake =

- Location within Michigan
- Location: Berrien County, Michigan and St. Joseph County, Indiana
- Coordinates: 41°45′31″N 86°22′38″W
- Type: lake
- Surface area: 61.781 acres (25.002 ha)

South Clear Lake is a lake in the U.S. states of Indiana and Michigan. The lake is 61.781 acres (25.002 ha) in size.

South Clear Lake was so named on account of the clear character of its water; the name was prefixed with "south" in order to avoid repetition with Clear Lake, also in Berrien County.
