= Goshorn Lake =

Lake in the state of Michigan, United States

- Location within Michigan Location within the United States
- Location: Allegan County, Michigan
- Coordinates: 42°40′57″N 86°10′58″W
- Type: Lake
- Primary outflows: Goshorn Creek
- Basin countries: United States
- Surface elevation: 614 ft (187 m)

Goshorn Lake is a small inland lake north of Saugatuck, Michigan, named after James Goshorn. It is separated by high sand dunes from the Lake Michigan shore and was once a meeting place for the Pottawatomi Native Americans.
