= Singer Lake =

- Location within Michigan
- Location: Berrien County, Michigan
- Coordinates: 41°56′59″N 86°27′20″W
- Type: lake
- Surface area: 25.861 acres (10.466 ha)

Singer Lake is a lake in Berrien County, in the U.S. state of Michigan. It has a size of 25.861 acres (10.466 ha).

Singer Lake has the name of Samuel Singer, a pioneer who settled at the lake in 1836.
