= Lakeville Lake (Michigan) =

Lake in Michigan, United States

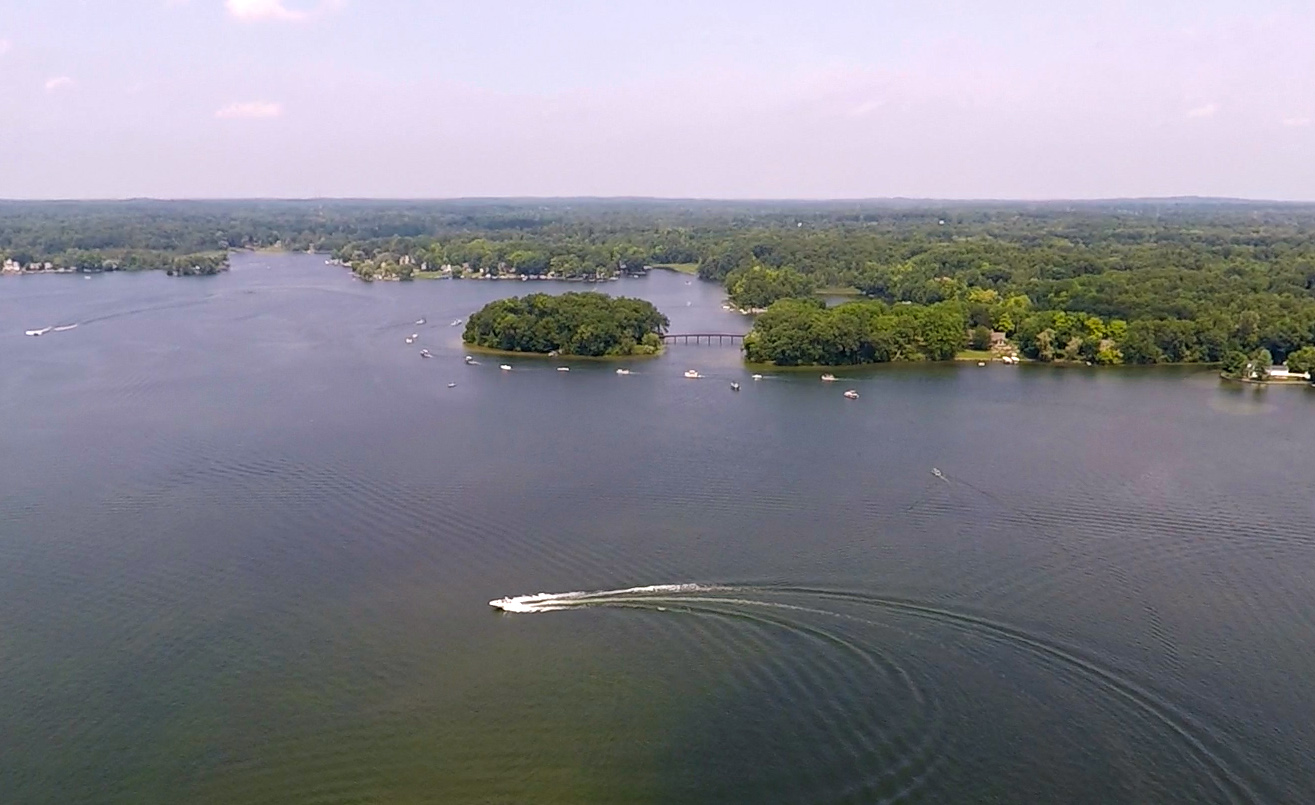
- Lakeville Lake on June 30, 2018, during the annual boat parade.

- Location within Michigan
- Location: Oakland County, Michigan
- Coordinates: 42°49′54″N 83°09′32″W
- Type: Lake
- Basin countries: United States
- Surface area: 460 acres (190 ha)
- Max. depth: 68 ft (21 m)
- Surface elevation: 950 ft (290 m)
- Settlements: Addison Township, Michigan

Lakeville Lake is an all-sports, 460-acre (190 ha) Oakland County, Michigan lake located in the northeast part of the county in Addison Township. The lake is 68 feet (21 m) deep and is one of the largest lakes in Oakland County.

The all-sports lake has a public boat launch.

== Fish ==
Lakeville Lake fish include panfish, bass, northern pike and walleye.
