= Jarvis Lake =

- Location within Michigan
- Location: Berrien County
- Coordinates: 42°04′09″N 86°14′14″W
- Type: lake
- Surface area: 19.54 acres (7.91 ha)
- Surface elevation: 214 m (702 ft)

Jarvis Lake is a lake in Berrien County, in the U.S. state of Michigan. The lake has a size of 19.54 acres (7.91 ha).

Jarvis Lake has the name of one B. Jarvis, the original owner of the site.
