= Weidman Millpond =

- Location within the state of Michigan
- Location: Weidman, Michigan
- Coordinates: 43°41′35″N 84°57′55″W
- Type: reservoir
- Basin countries: United States
- Surface elevation: 886 feet (270 m)

Weidman Millpond is a dammed pond in the town of Weidman, Michigan, United States. Coldwater River supplies the pond. The pond has been stocked with yellow perch and largemouth bass. Attempts to introduce northern pike failed, presumably due to the pond's shallow nature. The bass, perch, and sunfish are said to be plentiful. The millpond has a high waterfowl population; the shores are commonly covered with flocks of Canada geese. There are occasional sightings of wood ducks, a few reports of ospreys and a few pairs of mute swans. There is a strip of land that separates the Millpond from Lake of the Hills. There are fishing contests held on the Millpond.
