= Zukey Lake =

Lake in Michigan, United States

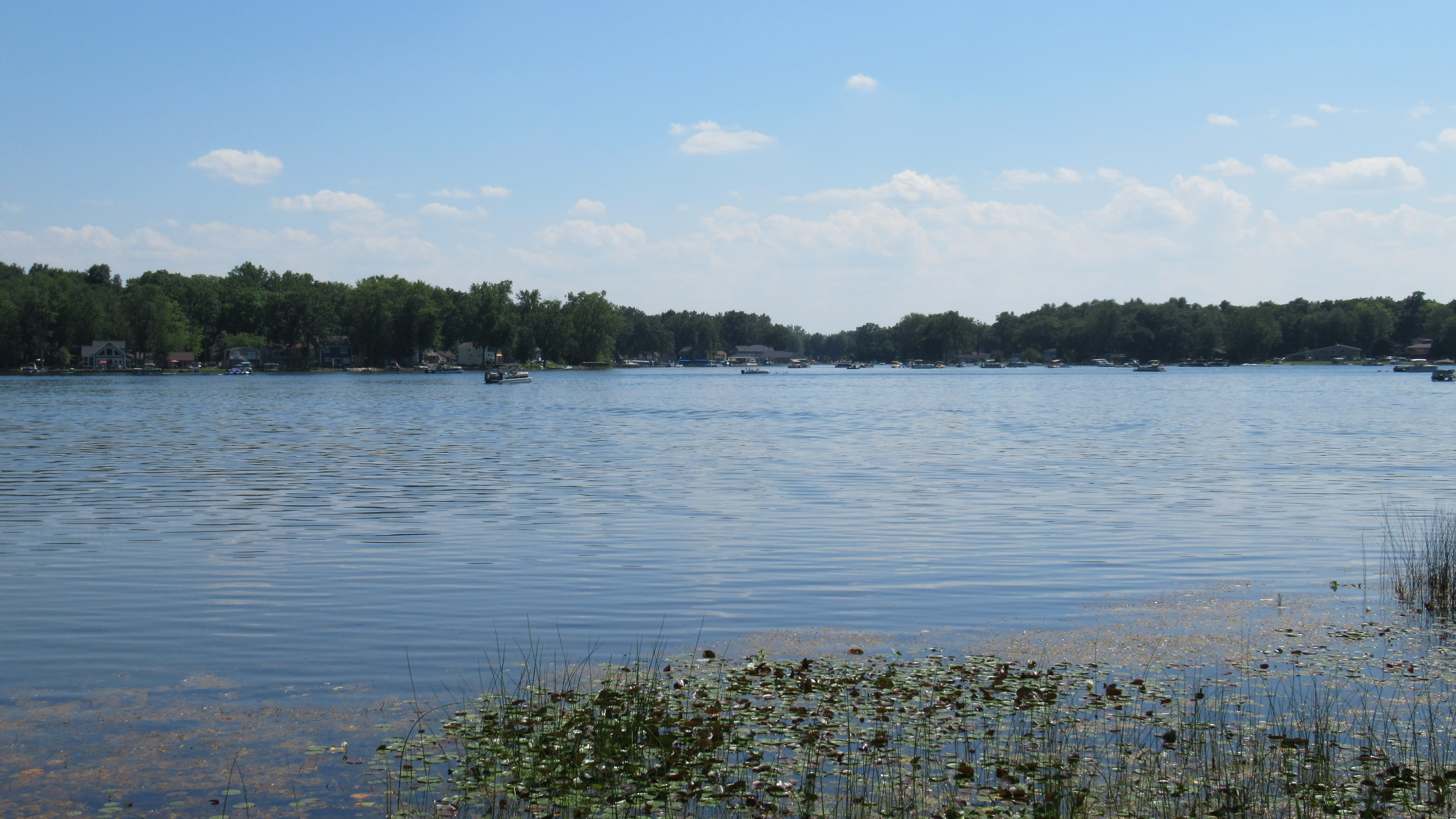
- Looking south from Lakelands Trail

- Location within Michigan Location within the United States
- Location: Livingston County, Michigan
- Coordinates: 42°27′16″N 83°50′53″W
- Type: Lake
- Basin countries: United States
- Surface area: 155 acres (0.6 km^{2})
- Max. depth: 44 ft (13.4 m)
- Surface elevation: 850 ft (259 m)

Zukey Lake is a small lake in Livingston County, Michigan.

== See also ==
- List of lakes in Michigan
