= YMCA Camp Eberhart =

Coordinates: 41.9340°N 85.7539°W

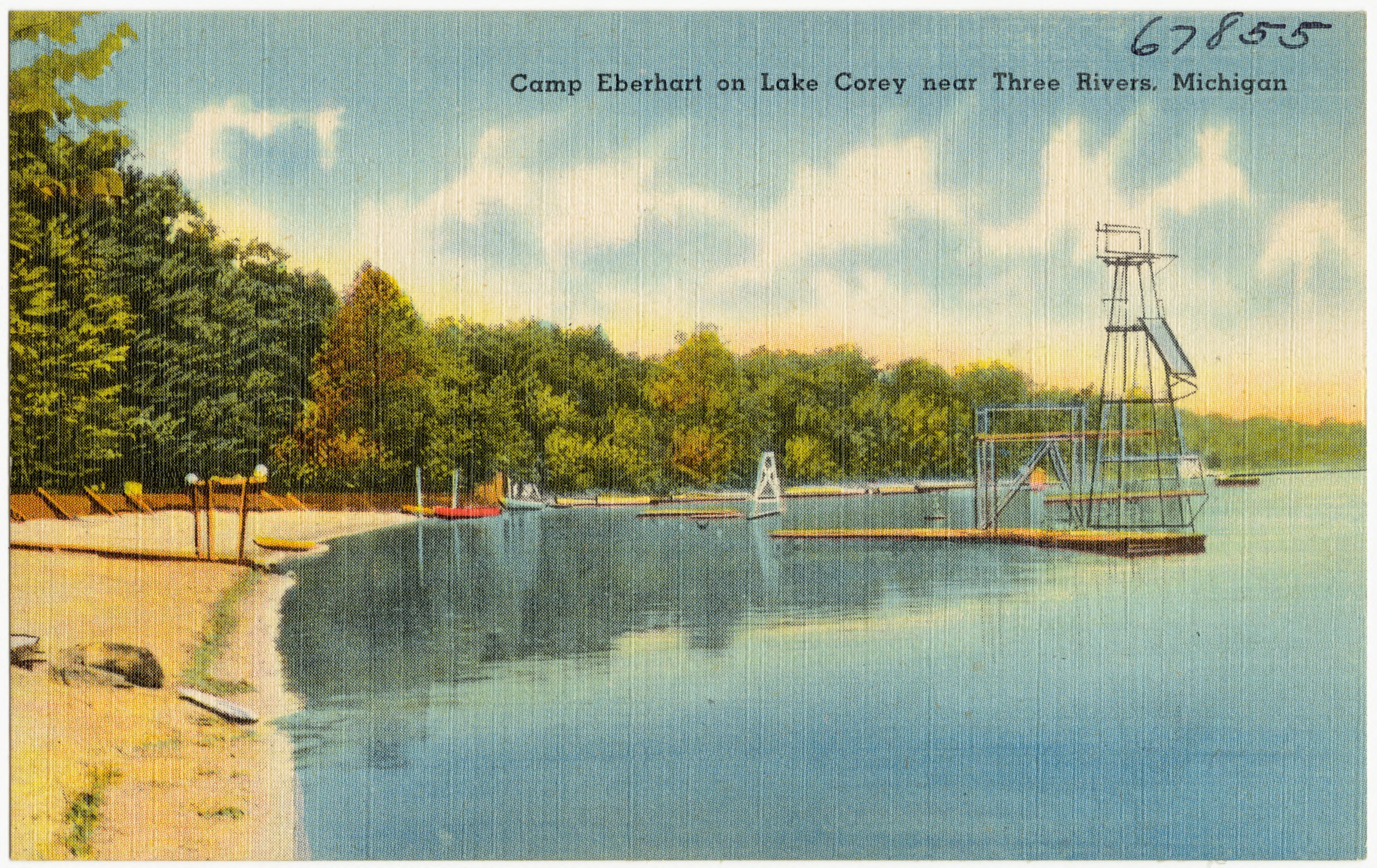
Old postcard from the camp

YMCA Camp Eberhart is a branch of the YMCA of Greater Michiana located in Three Rivers, Michigan. Camp Eberhart was first built in 1909. The camp was the first YMCA camp in the country to offer a summer program for young women. Camp Eberhart was fully co-educational in the 1970s. Today, the camp serves both children and adults. Camp Eberhart is situated on 200 acres (0.81 km^{2}) of land with over a mile of shoreline on Corey Lake, in Three Rivers, MI. With the girl cabins of Morris 1 for seven- and eight-year-olds; Morris 2 for eight- and nine-year-olds; 1&2 for 10- and 11-year-olds; 3&4 for 11- and 12-year-olds; 5&6 for 12- and 13-year-olds; 7&8 for 13- and 14-year-olds; and Leighton for 14-, 15-, and 16-year-olds; the boys cabins are Baker Cooper for seven- and eight-year-olds; 9&10 for nine- and 10-year-olds; 11&12 for eleven- and 12-year-olds; 13&14 for 13- and 14year-olds; 15&16 for 15-year-olds and 16-year-olds; and the Hill for every older kid. At Eberhart today there are the programs of rocketry, swimming, sailing, boats, canoes, kayaks, fishing, photography, archery, riflery, nature, outdoor living, and many more. There also the specialty programs of waterskiing, horseback riding, trail biking, challenge course, and others.

== History ==
On July 24, 1909, Harris Eberhart traveled to Illinois. While his father was driving, the car stalled on a set of railroad tracks in Munster, Indiana. As a speeding train was approaching, Harris and friend Richard Flagg were sleeping in the car, while his father and driver tried to fix the car before the approaching train came. The train hit the rear of the car and dragged it for several hundred feet. This accident killed Richard Flagg. Harris was found 50 feet (15 m) from the scene of the accident. He was found unconscious and suffered from life threatening injuries. Harris was rushed to a hospital in Hammond, Indiana, and died several hours later.

One day after the accident Harris's family were cleaning out his room and found his diary with camp establishment details on Corey Lake. They quickly made a large donation to the YMCA. Harris's father came to Michigan purchased 17 acres (69,000 m^{2}) of land, and started laying out the camp just as his son had planned.
