= Arcadia Lake (Michigan) =

Lake in Manistee County, Michigan, United States

- Bar Lake; North Bar Lake
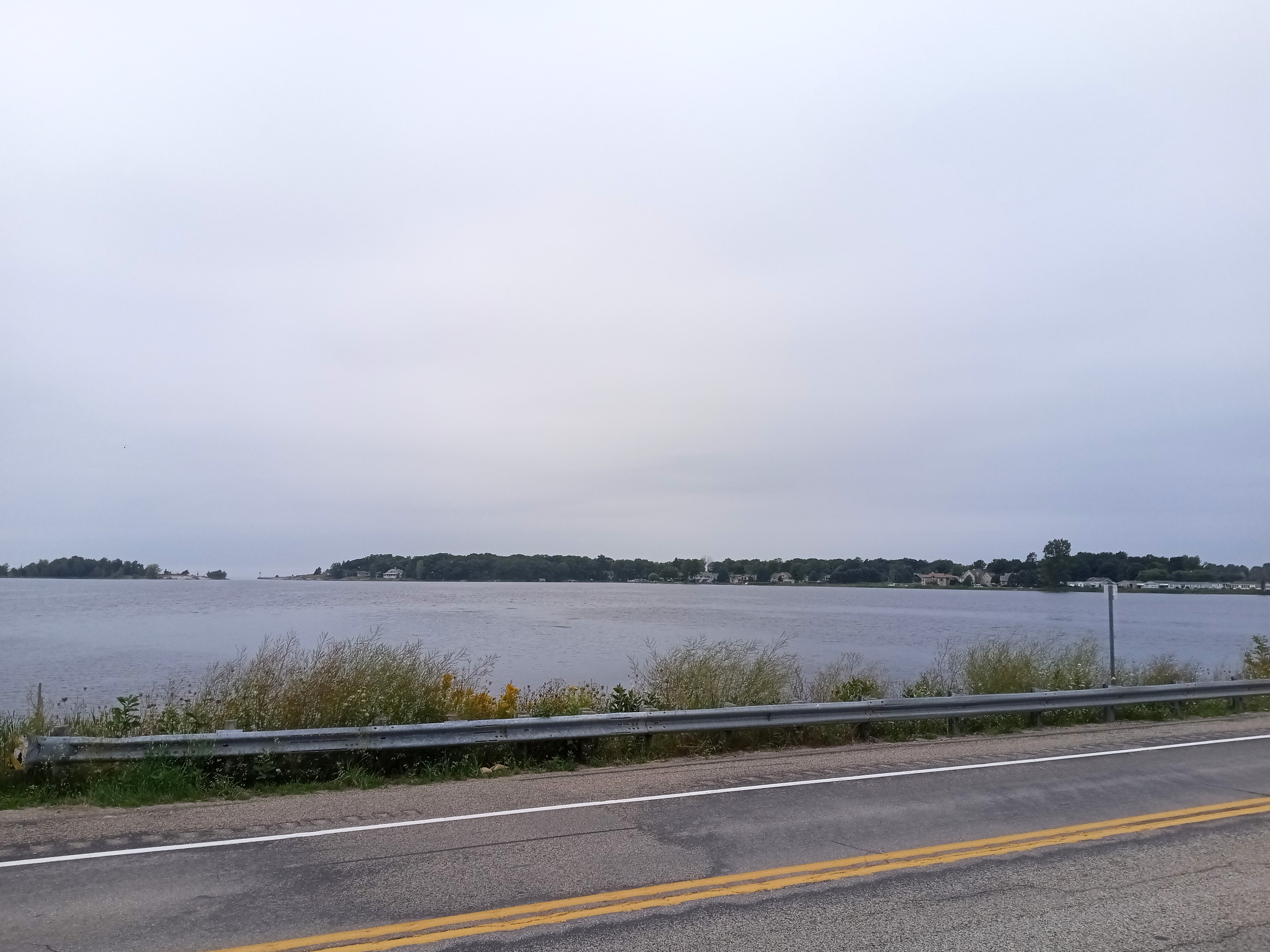
- Arcadia Lake (Michigan)

- Location within Michigan
- Location: Manistee County, Michigan, United States
- Coordinates: 44°29′00″N 86°14′00″W
- Type: Lake
- Primary inflows: Bowens Creek
- Basin countries: United States
- Surface area: 275 acres (111 ha)
- Max. depth: 28 ft (8.5 m)
- Surface elevation: 581 ft (177 m)

Arcadia Lake is a lake in Manistee County, Michigan. The lake, formerly called Bar Lake, is separated from Lake Michigan by a sand bar. A 1,100-foot (340 m) dredged channel connects the two lakes.

== See also ==
- List of lakes in Michigan
