= Dockery Lake (Michigan) =

Lake in the state of Michigan, United States

- Location within Michigan
- Location: Mason County, Michigan
- Coordinates: 43°53′49″N 86°14′14″W
- Type: Lake
- Basin countries: United States
- Surface elevation: 702 feet (214 m)

Dockery Lake is a lake in Mason County, Michigan, in the United States.

Dockery Lake derives its name from a doctor who settled near it.

== See also ==
- List of lakes in Michigan
