= Pleiness Lake =

Lake in the state of Michigan, United States

- Lost Lake, Pashawsey Lake
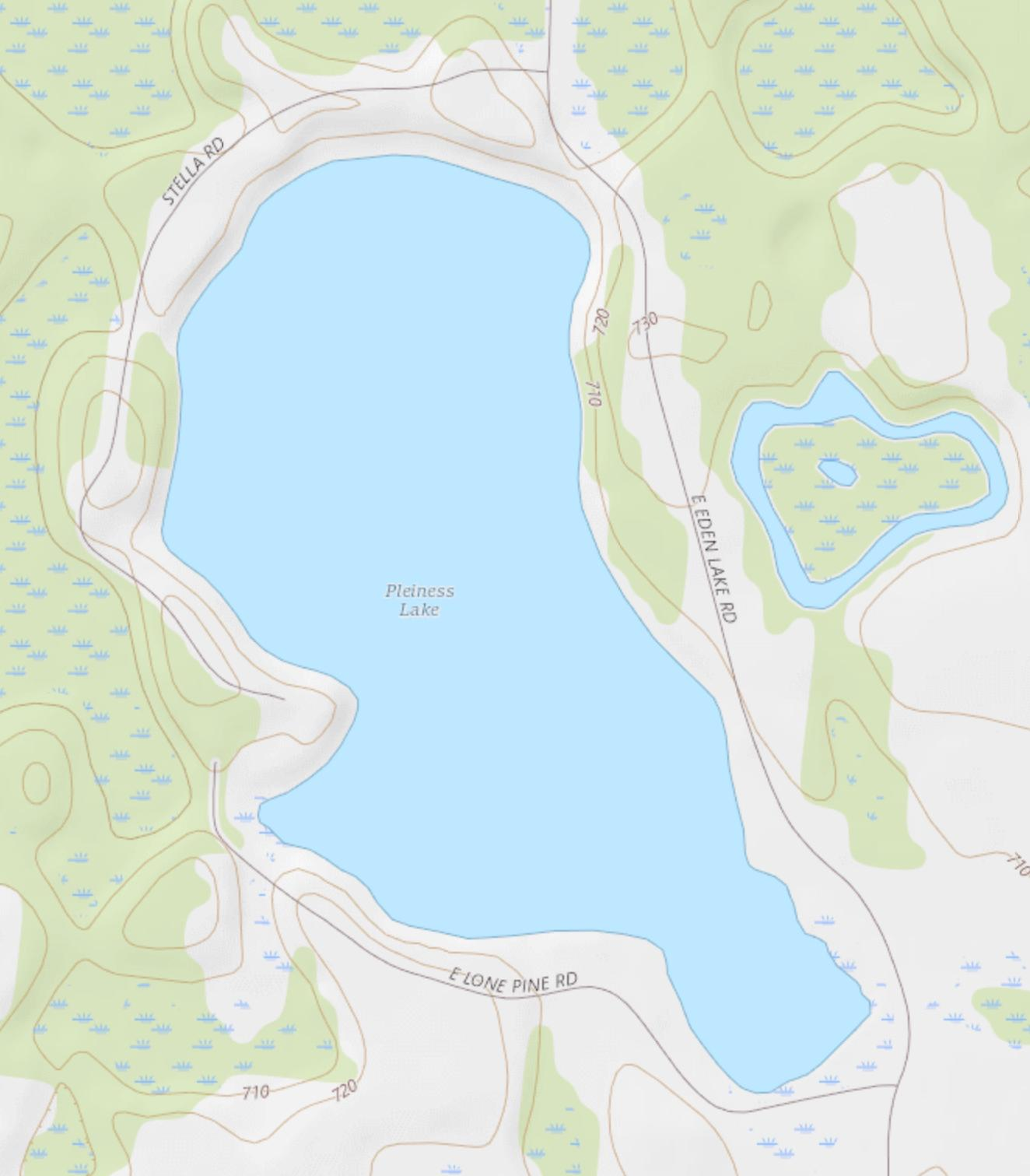
- A USGS topographic map of Pleiness Lake

- Location of Pleiness Lake in Michigan Pleiness Lake (the United States)
- Location: Eden Township, Mason County, Michigan
- Coordinates: 43°51′34.2″N 86°14′42.36″W
- Type: natural lake
- Basin countries: United States
- Managing agency: Michigan Department of Natural Resources
- Surface area: 81 acres (33 ha)
- Average depth: 9 ft (2.7 m)
- Max. depth: 38 ft (12 m)
- Shore length^{1}: 1.9284 mi (3.1035 km)
- Surface elevation: 699 ft (213 m)
- ^{1} Shore length is not a well-defined measure.

Pleiness Lake, also known as Lost Lake, is a natural lake located in Eden Township, Mason County, Michigan in the northwestern part of Michigan's Lower Peninsula.

== History ==
=== Native American settlement ===
Tribes of the Ottawa people native to Michigan originally spanned from the Grand River to the nearby Pere Marquette River, with tribes migrating throughout the seasons between settlements. In 1855, a federal treaty between nine tribes of the Ottawa, which would later be known as the Little River Band of Ottawa Indians, established the Pashawsey Indian Reserve, which settled the Ottawa into modern day Eden Township along the lake. Ownership of the lands in the area was never determined and many moved back to the Manistee River or had left lumber camps in Wisconsin by 1900.

=== Pleiness family ===
In 1881, John Jacob Pleiness moved into the area at the age of seven with his mother and father after their home at Fort Hope was destroyed in a fire. In the 1890s, Pleiness established a blacksmith shop on the southeastern plot near the lake, which was then known as Lost Lake, and later established a farm. Between 1887 and 1909, the Mason and Oceana Railroad operated directly south of Lost Lake.

The area and much of the United States experienced an extreme drought in the summer of 1930 shortly before the Dust Bowl period, which occurred for most of the decade. Pleiness' son, John Jacob Pleiness Jr., reported in September 1930 that the lake's waterline fell about 26 in (66 cm) to its lowest level in over 40 years.

=== Modern history ===
In October 1941, communities proposed to change the name from Lost Lake since there were another 25 lakes in Michigan with the same name. It was proposed to rename Lost Lake to Pashawsey Lake in October 1941 to recognize the Pashawsey Indian Reserve that once incorporated the lake into its area, with "pashawsey" meaning "light" in the Ottawa language. At the meeting, the decision of Mason County supervisors was to rename Lost Lake to Pleiness Lake. In the summer of 1942, there was little resort activity at the lake. John Jacob Pleiness died on November 22, 1948.

Since then, cottages have been constructed on the lake and the Michigan Department of Natural Resources and county constructed a boat launch and outhouse in the southern portion of the lake.

== Ecology ==
=== Fish ===
In the early 1900s, the Michigan Board of Fish Commissioners began planting fish into Pleiness Lake. On August 15, 1905, 75 adult largemouth bass were introduced and an additional 1,500 largemouth bass fingerlings were introduced on July 12, 1906.

Fish inhabiting Pleiness Lake include:

- Bluegill
- Largemouth bass
- Longear sunfish
- Smallmouth bass
- Yellow perch
- Northern Pike

=== Plants ===
In the 1940s, Eurasian watermilfoil, a submerged aquatic plant, was introduced into North America and became invasive. Similar to other lakes in Michigan, Pleiness Lake has had to combat the growth of Eurasian watermilfoil, with the Michigan Department of Environmental Quality partnering with Mason County to spray the lake when necessary.
