= Coveney Lake =

- Location within Michigan
- Location: Berrien County, Michigan
- Coordinates: 41°53′05″N 86°25′37″W
- Type: lake

Coveney Lake is a lake in Berrien County, in the U.S. state of Michigan.

Coveney Lake has the name Joseph Coveney, an Irish immigrant who settled there in the 1830s.
