= Pleasant Lake (St. Joseph County, Michigan) =

Lake in St. Joseph County, Michigan, USA

Coordinates: 41°57′24″N 85°42′24″W

Pleasant Lake is a 262-acre lake located near Three Rivers in the Michigan county of St. Joseph. The lake is 53 feet in maximum depth.

The lake was surveyed by the Michigan Department of Natural Resources (MDNR) in 1996. The survey uncovered significant panfishery resources in the form of bluegill and yellow perch. MDNR records indicated that stocking the lake with walleye had been a failure. A public access shore site, with a boat ramp, stands on the southwest corner of the lake.
