= Gun Lake (Mason County, Michigan) =

Lake in the state of Michigan, United States

- Location within Michigan Location within the United States
- Location: Mason County, Michigan
- Coordinates: 44°04′54″N 86°10′30″W
- Type: Lake
- Basin countries: United States
- Surface area: 219 acres (89 ha)
- Max. depth: 22 ft (6.7 m)
- Surface elevation: 722 feet (220 m)

Gun Lake is a lake in Mason County, Michigan, in the United States.

The lake most likely was named for Luther Gunn, a local politician and businessman in the lumber industry.

== See also ==
- List of rivers of Michigan
