= Clear Lake (Berrien County, Michigan) =

- Location within Michigan
- Location: Berrien County, Michigan
- Coordinates: 41°49′57″N 86°25′17″W
- Type: Lake
- Surface area: 78.523 acres (31.777 ha)
- Surface elevation: 735 feet (224 m)

Clear Lake is a lake in Berrien County, in the U.S. state of Michigan. The lake is 78.523 acres (31.777 ha) in size.

Clear Lake was so named on account of the clear character of its water.

Life Action Camp and Fullers Campground are located on the eastern shore on the lake.
