= Strawberry Lake (Michigan) =

Lake in the state of Michigan, United States

- Location within Michigan Location within the United States
- Location: Livingston County, Michigan
- Coordinates: 42°27′00″N 83°50′34″W
- Type: Lake
- Basin countries: United States
- Surface area: 257 acres (1 km^{2})
- Max. depth: 52 ft (16 m)
- Surface elevation: 850 ft (259 m)

Strawberry Lake is a small lake in Livingston County, Michigan.

On January 16, 2018, the type specimen for the Hamburg meteorite fell on Strawberry Lake.

== See also ==
- List of lakes in Michigan
