= Anna River (Michigan) =

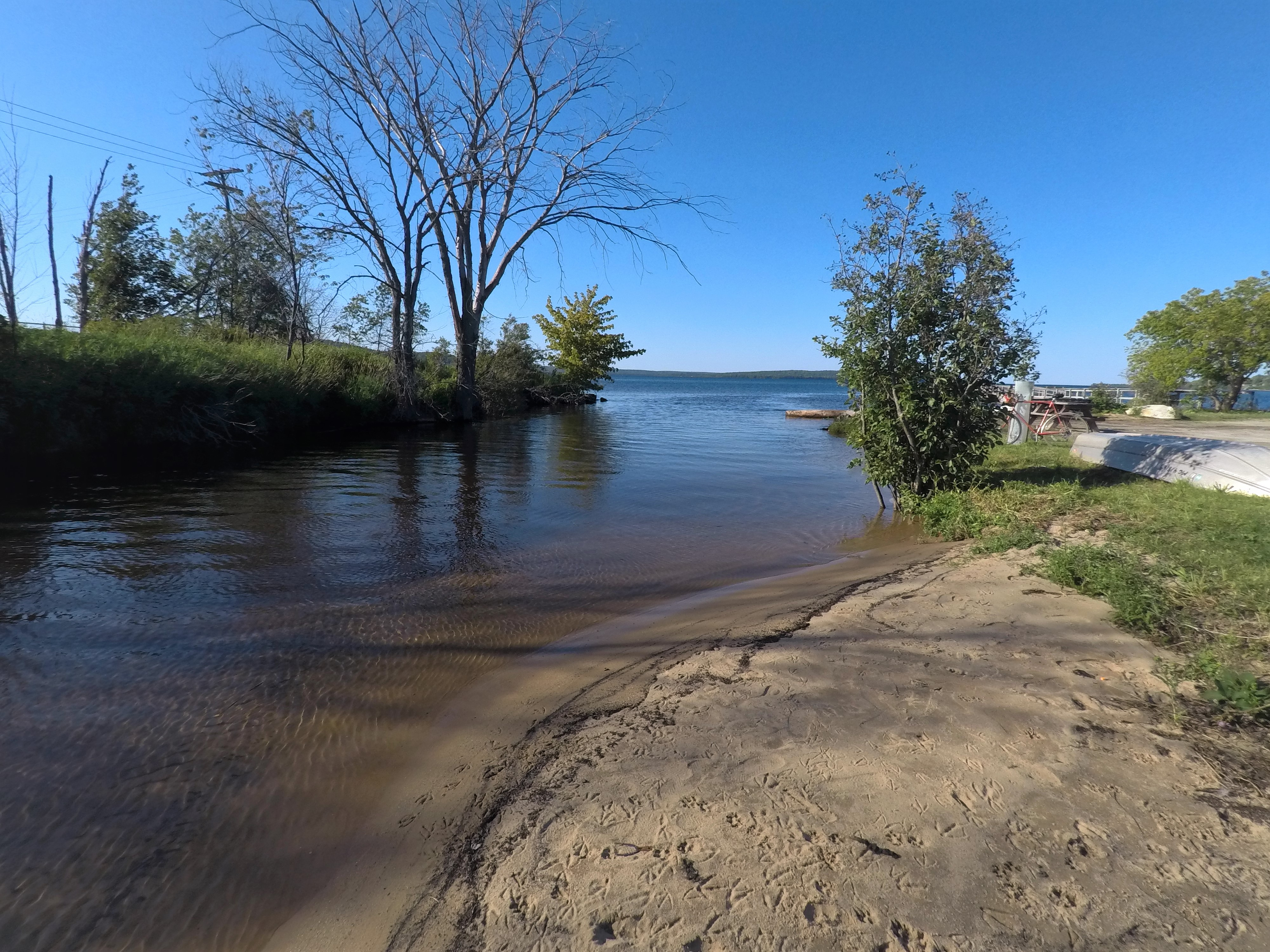

Location
- Country: United States

Physical characteristics
- Source
  - location: Au Train Township, Alger County, Michigan
- Mouth
  - location: Lake Superior at Munising, Michigan
  - elevation: 604 ft (184 m)

The Anna River is a 7.1-mile-long (11.4 km) river on the Upper Peninsula of the U.S. state of Michigan. The mouth of the river is at in the city of Munising on the South Bay of Grand Island Harbor on Lake Superior.

The river rises in the Anna Marsh in eastern Au Train Township at . It flows first to the southeast, then turns mostly east and receives the outflow from Mud Lake and the Valley Spur Creek. It is joined by Wagner Creek near the Wagner Falls Scenic Site and turns to the north into the city of Munising. Portions of the river run through the Hiawatha National Forest.

Several waterfalls in the river's watershed are regional attractions (in order from the mouth inland):

- Horseshoe Falls on Stutts Creek near Munising. Directions: From M-28 near Munising's southern limits, turn east onto Prospect St. Go 2 blocks to Bell Avenue and turn left (north). Go 1 block to Horseshoe Falls parking area on the right.
- Alger Falls on Alger Creek, about one mile (1.6 km) south of Munising where M-94 meets M-28. This waterfall cascades down 30 feet (9.1 m) of rock and can be easily seen along the east side of M-28, although the water flow varies considerably.
- Wagner Falls Scenic Site on Wagner Creek, about 1.5 miles (2.4 km) south of Munising and just west of Wetmore on the east side of M-94. The state-owned, 22-acre (89,000 m^{2}) Wagner Falls Scenic Site encompasses Wagner Falls.
