= Munising Rear Range Light =

Lighthouse in Michigan, United States

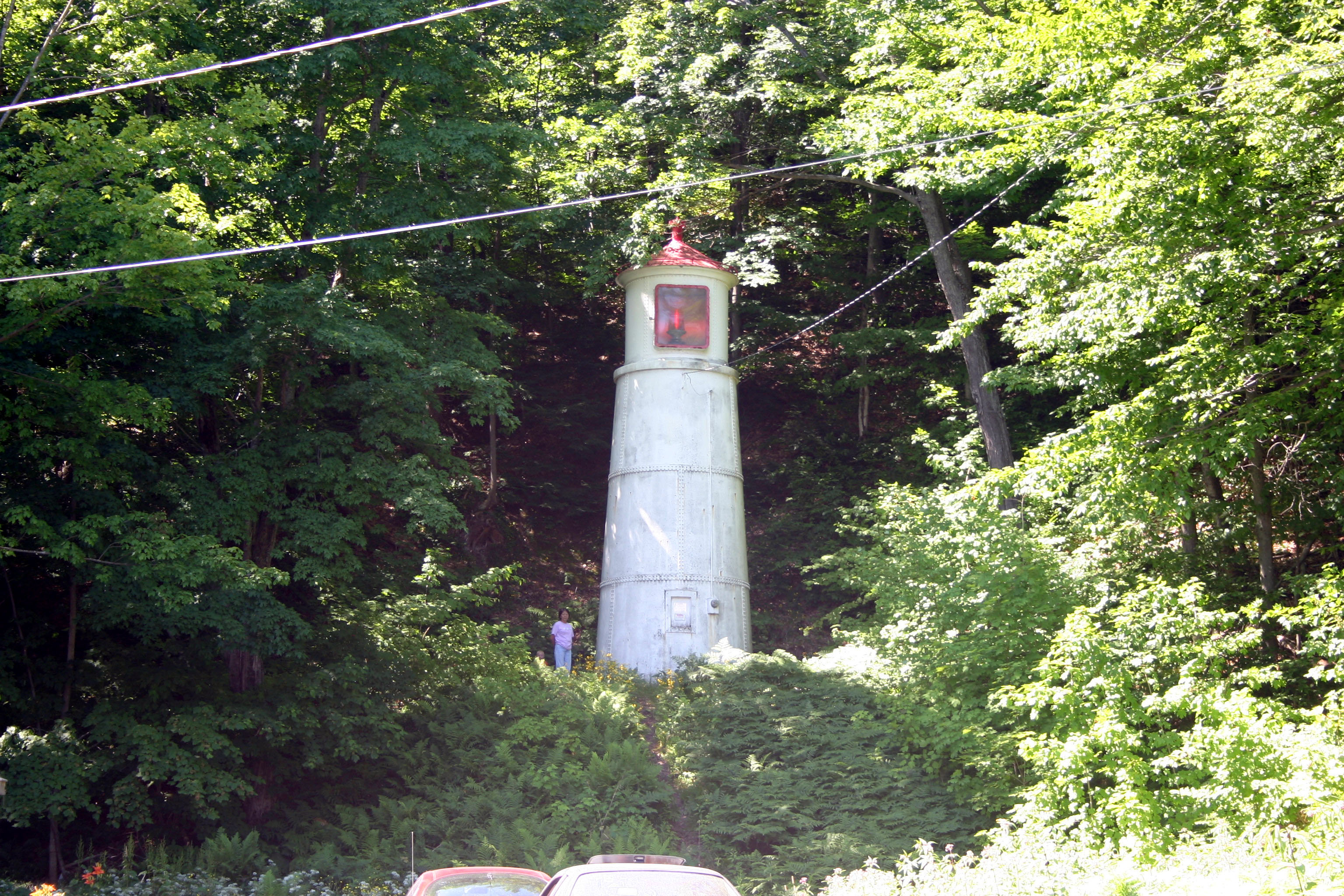
- The light in 2004
- Location: Munising, Michigan, United States
- Coordinates: 46°24′45″N 86°39′50″W

Tower
- Constructed: 1908
- Construction: steel
- Height: 33 ft (10 m)
- Shape: conical
- Markings: White

Light
- First lit: 1908
- Focal height: 107 ft (33 m)
- Characteristic: F R

The Munising Rear Range Light works with the Munising Front Range Light to project a line of light out into Lake Superior in order to guide boats from the open lake into the safe harbor at Munising, Michigan. This harbor is a natural bay (thus providing protection from easterly or westerly storms) and sheltered on the north by Grand Island. Grand Island however provides a serious navigation hazard, and as boats navigate in the East Channel, there are several dangerous rock ledges that have the potential to sink a vessel. This pair of range lights replaced the ineffective Grand Island East Channel Light in 1905. The history of these lighthouses is documented by Terry Pepper and is not reproduced here.

The light is located on the hill south of the village of Munising. It is only a 33-foot (10 m) steel tower, but located up on the hill, it is 107 feet (33 m) above the lake level. It contains an incandescent electric light inside a red shield.
