= Memorial Falls (Michigan) =

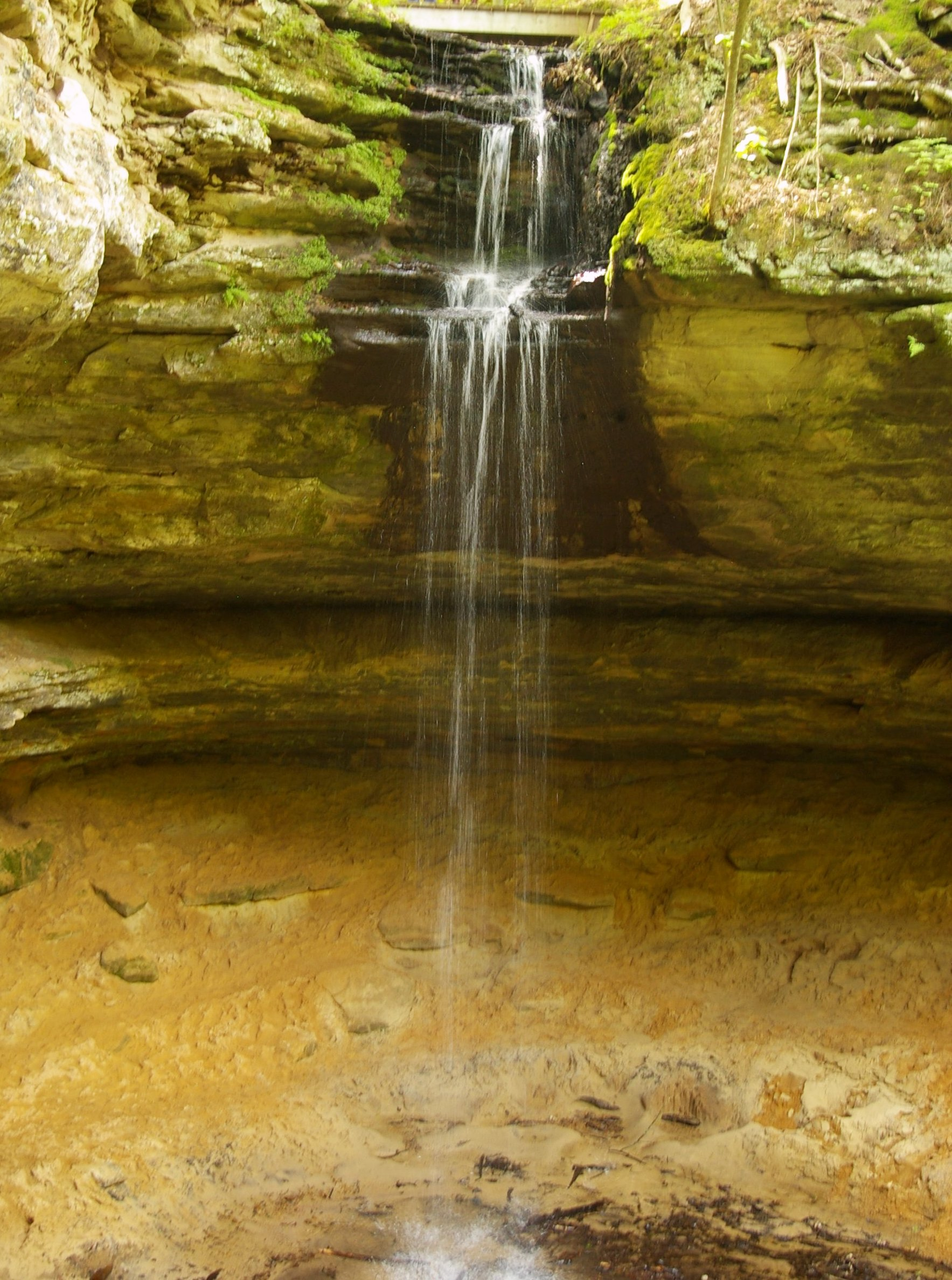
- Memorial Falls
- Interactive map of Memorial Falls
- Location: Alger County, Michigan
- Coordinates: 46.418°N 86.62694°W
- Total height: 40 feet (12 m)

Memorial Falls are two similar waterfalls in adjacent gorges on small streams near the city of Munising Michigan. The larger falls drop approximately 40 feet. There is a cave behind both falls. There is a small natural arch in the sandstone between the two gorges near the top of the falls. The level of water coming over the falls can vary greatly depending on snow melt or rainfall and the smaller of the two falls are often dry. Memorial Falls are two of the less-advertised and less-maintained falls in the area and are accessed via a trail from a residential street above the falls. An additional trail leads to the bottom of the falls. The falls belong to the Michigan Nature Association. They are very close to Tannery Falls.

== Gallery ==
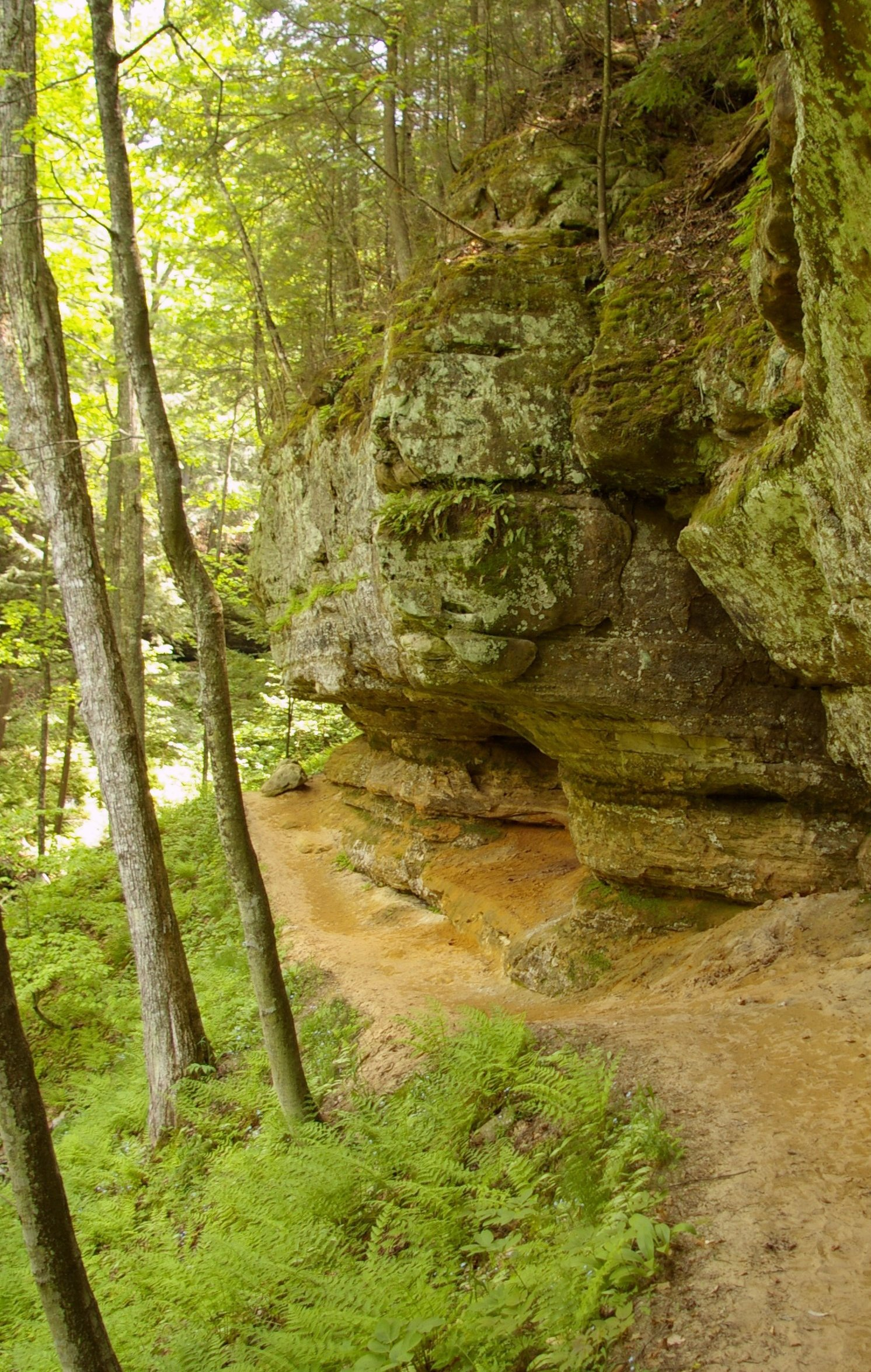
Trail leading to foot of Memorial Falls

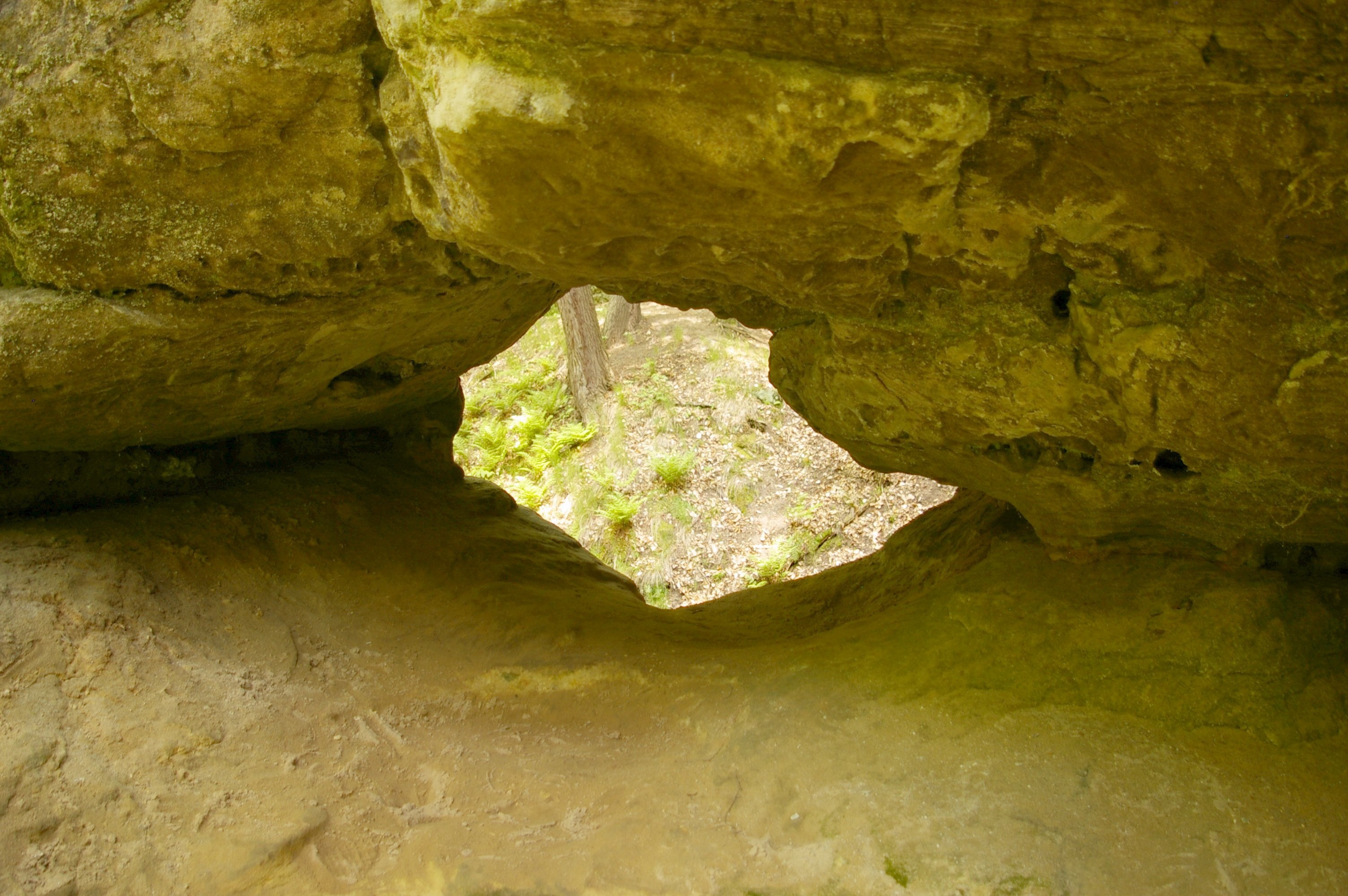
Natural Arch between the two falls

== See also ==
- List of waterfalls
