= Grand Island National Recreation Area =

Protected area of Michigan, United States

- Location within the United States Location within Michigan
- Location: Grand Island, Lake Superior, United States
- Nearest city: Munising, Michigan
- Coordinates: 46°30′25″N 86°39′47″W
- Area: 13,500 acres (55 km^{2})
- Established: 1990
- Governing body: United States Forest Service
- Website: Hiwatha National Forest - Grand Island National Recreation Area

The Grand Island National Recreation Area is a national recreation area in Hiawatha National Forest under jurisdiction of the U.S. Forest Service. Located on Grand Island, Michigan, offshore from Munising, Michigan, the Grand Island National Recreation Area covers approximately 13,500 acres (55 km^{2}) of Lake Superior woodland. Grand Island's glacier-cut lake shoreline measures approximately 35 miles (56 km) in length. The island's maximum dimension is 8 miles (13 km) from north to south. Grand Island was designated a national recreation area by the U.S. Congress in 1990 after the U.S. Forest Service purchased the island from its former owner, Cleveland Cliffs Iron Co.

== Geology ==
Grand Island's geology is an extension of the sandstone strata of the adjacent Pictured Rocks National Lakeshore. Island sandstone cliffs as tall as 300 feet (91 m) in height plunge down into the lake. A 23-mile (37 km) perimeter trail skirts much of the island's shoreline.

== History ==
Native Americans quickly found the fisheries around Grand Island to be a resource for seasonal and year-round living. Artifacts from as early as 3300 years before the present (1300 BC) have been found.

== Tourism ==
Grand Island National Recreation Area is served during summer months by a tourist ferry and island tour bus. The ferry ride, which is less than 1 mile (1.6 km) long, shuttles between a dock on M-28, northwest of Munising, and Grand Island's Williams Landing. Ticket fees and an admission fee to the island are charged. During the summer months, the ferry makes several trips to the island each day.

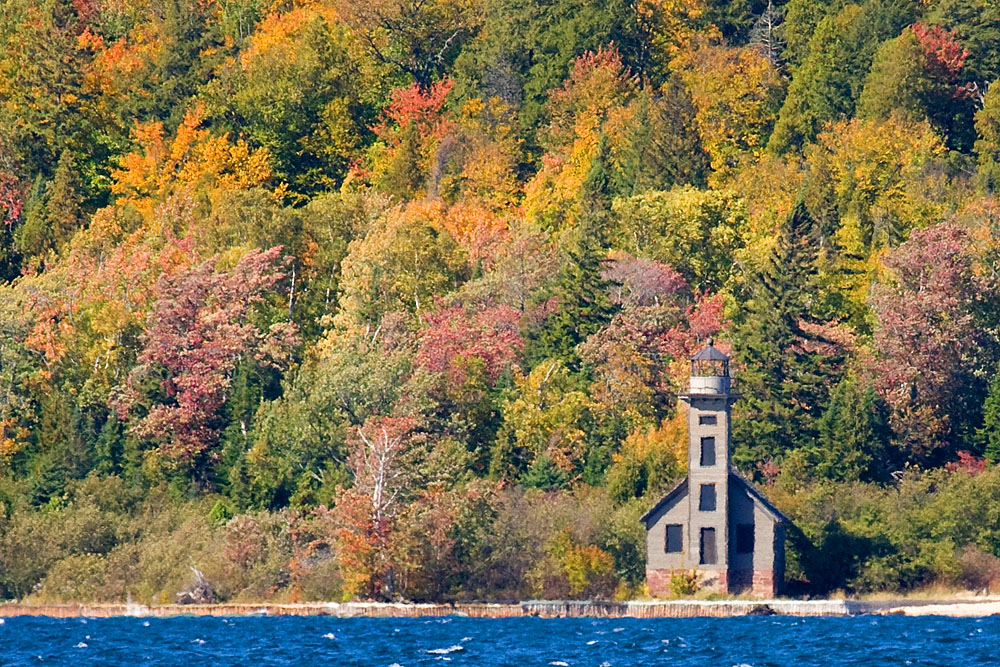
The Grand Island East Channel Light in 2007

A small portion of Grand Island, the Thumb, remained privately owned as of 2012. The Thumb contains the historic 1868 Grand Island East Channel Light or 'East Channel Light', on the eastern ship channel from Lake Superior into the port of Munising. The lighthouse remained in operation until 1913. The privately owned lighthouse can be viewed from Sand Point on the mainland, within the Pictured Rocks National Lakeshore, or may be viewed from the water.

== Recreational opportunities ==
The U.S. Forest Services recommends that visitors enjoy camping, fishing, hiking, hunting, mountain biking, and trapping on Grand Island, subject to state license laws. There are 17 campsites within the Grand Island NRA. The largest animal with a breeding presence on the island is the black bear, from which campers must protect themselves. Rockclimbing is strongly discouraged because the island's dramatic sandstone cliffs are friable and crumbly.

The Grand Island Trail Marathon has been held on the island every July since 2005, with the exception of 2020 due to the COVID-19 pandemic. The event has featured in the past a 2K race for children and a 10K race. In recent years, the event has included half marathon, marathon, and 50 km races.
