= Munising Front Range Light =

Lighthouse in Michigan, United States

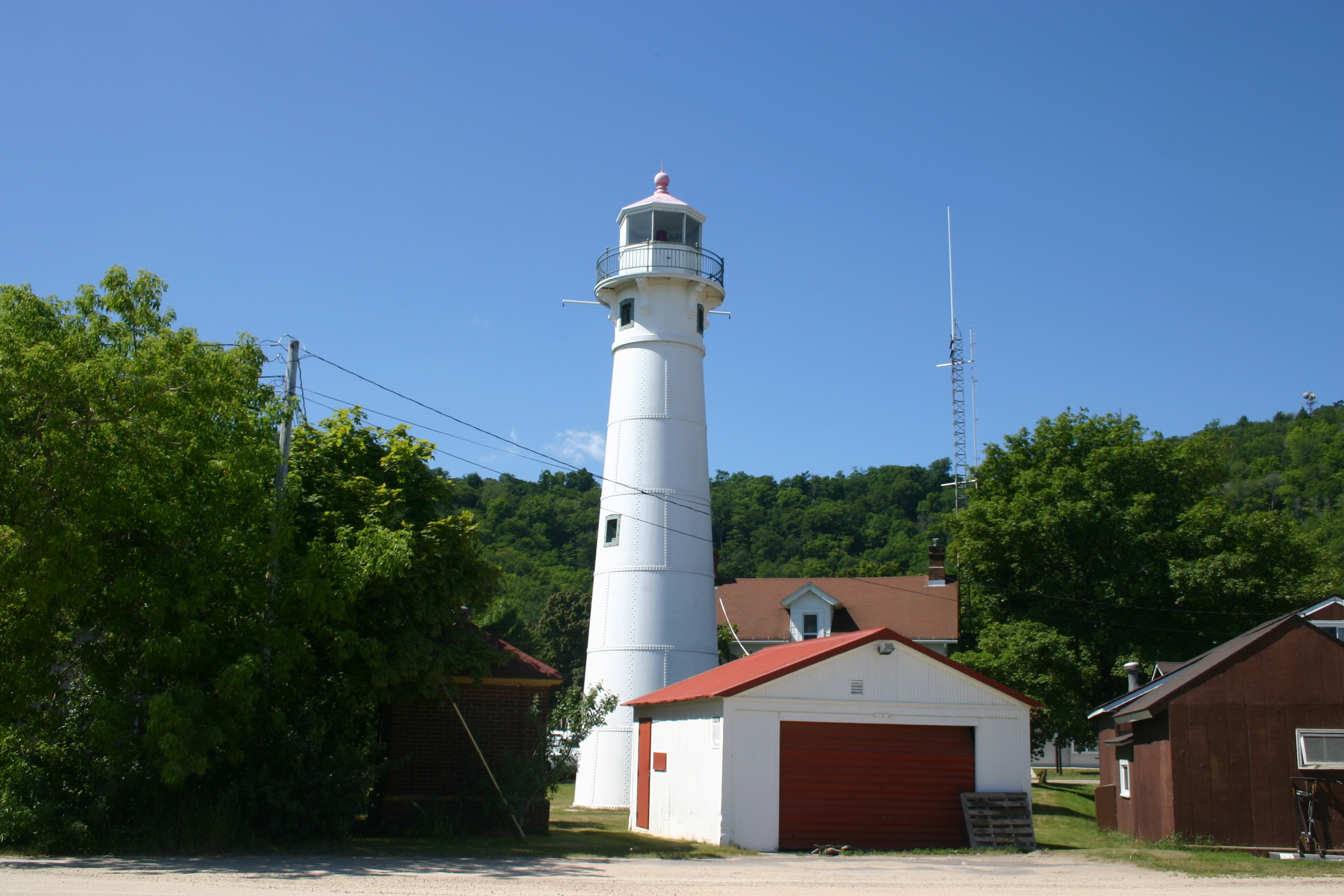
- The light in 2004 from the lake side
- Location: Munising, Michigan, United States
- Coordinates: 46°24′54″N 86°39′40″W

Tower
- Constructed: 1908
- Construction: steel
- Height: 58 ft (18 m)
- Shape: conical
- Markings: White

Light
- First lit: 1908
- Focal height: 79 ft (24 m)
- Characteristic: F R

The Munising Front Range Light and its matching Munising Rear Range Light replaced the ineffective Grand Island East Channel Light in 1905. These two lights combine to guide boats from the open waters of Lake Superior down the East Channel next to Grand Island into the harbor of Munising. The history of these lighthouses is documented by Terry Pepper and is not reproduced here.

The Front Range Light is located at the western edge of Munising north of M-28. At this time, the light is managed by the National Park Service, the grounds are open to visitors, but the tower is closed.

According to US Government publication, "The American Practical Navigator", Chapter 5: Range lights are light pairs that indicate a specific line of position when they are in line. The higher rear light is placed behind the front light. When the mariner sees the lights vertically in line, he is on the range line. If the front light appears left of the rear light, the observer is to the right of the range line; if the front appears to the right of the rear, the observer is left of the range line.

== Gallery ==
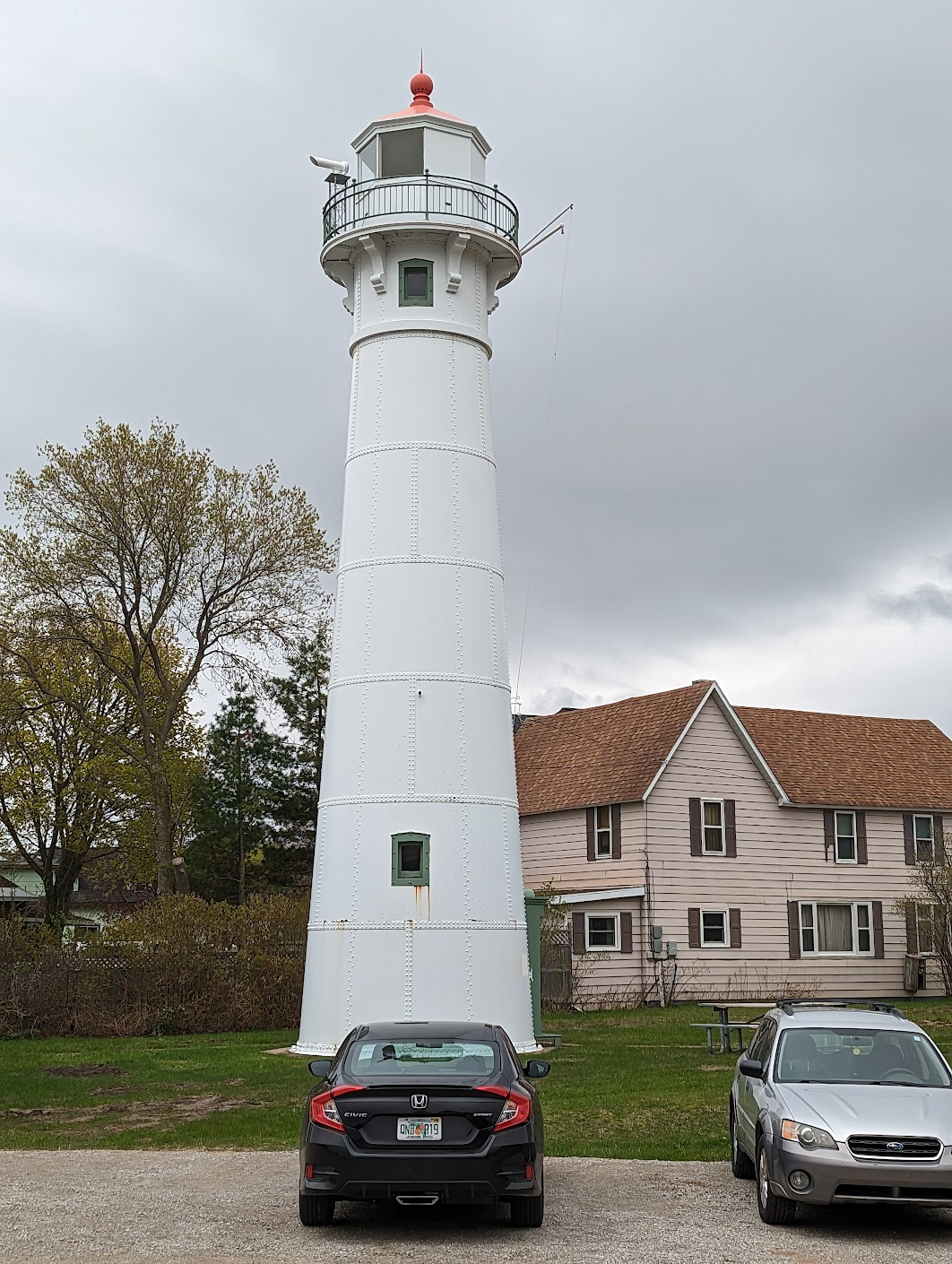
The lighthouse in 2023.

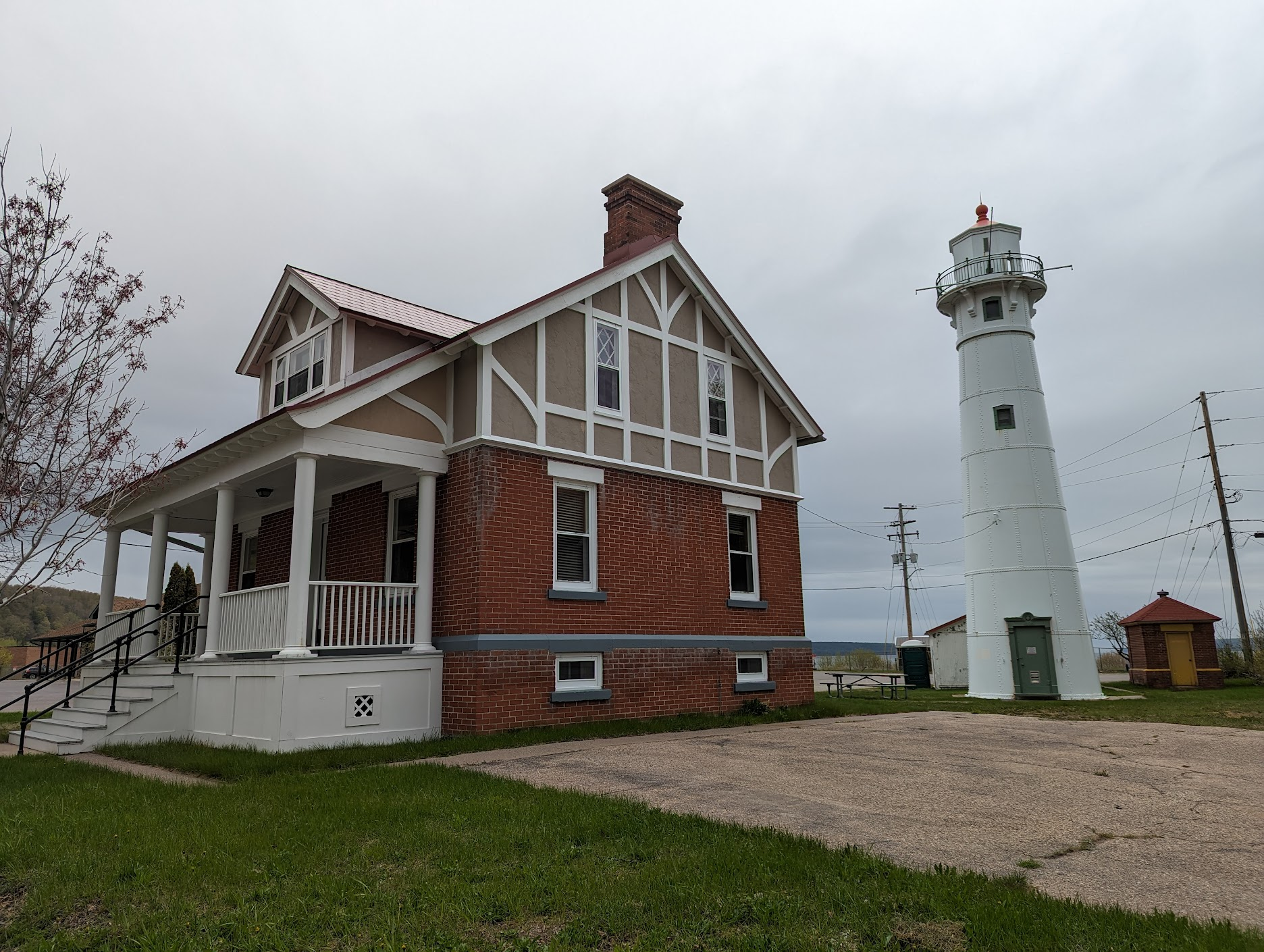
The lighthouse (right) with the former house of the keeper on the left. The house is now a private residence.
