= Tannery Falls =

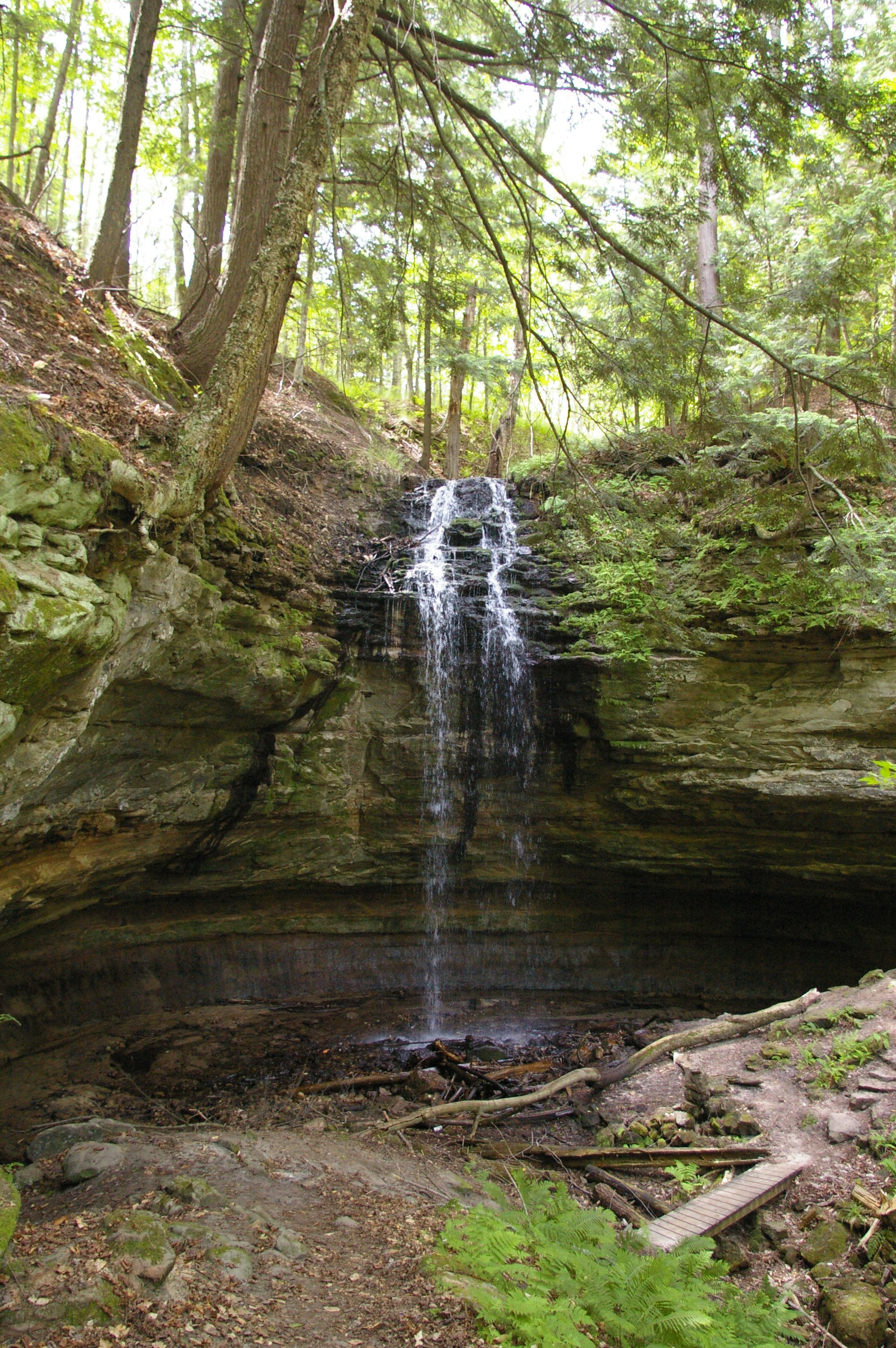
- Tannery Falls
- Interactive map of Tannery Falls
- Location: Alger County, Michigan
- Coordinates: 46.41556°N 86.62694°W
- Total height: 40 feet (12 m)
- Watercourse: Tannery Creek

Tannery Falls is a waterfall on Tannery Creek located near the city of Munising, Michigan. The Falls are also sometimes called the Rudy M. Olson Memorial Falls. Tannery Creek flows behind a small residential area before reaching The falls which drop 40 feet (12 m) into an impressive sandstone canyon. There is a cave behind the falls. The level of water coming over the falls can vary greatly depending on snow melt or rainfall. Tannery Falls is one of the less-advertised and less-maintained falls in the area. For a number of years, the falls were under private ownership. The land around the area was purchased by the Michigan Nature Association which created a public nature preserve that includes the nearby Memorial Falls.

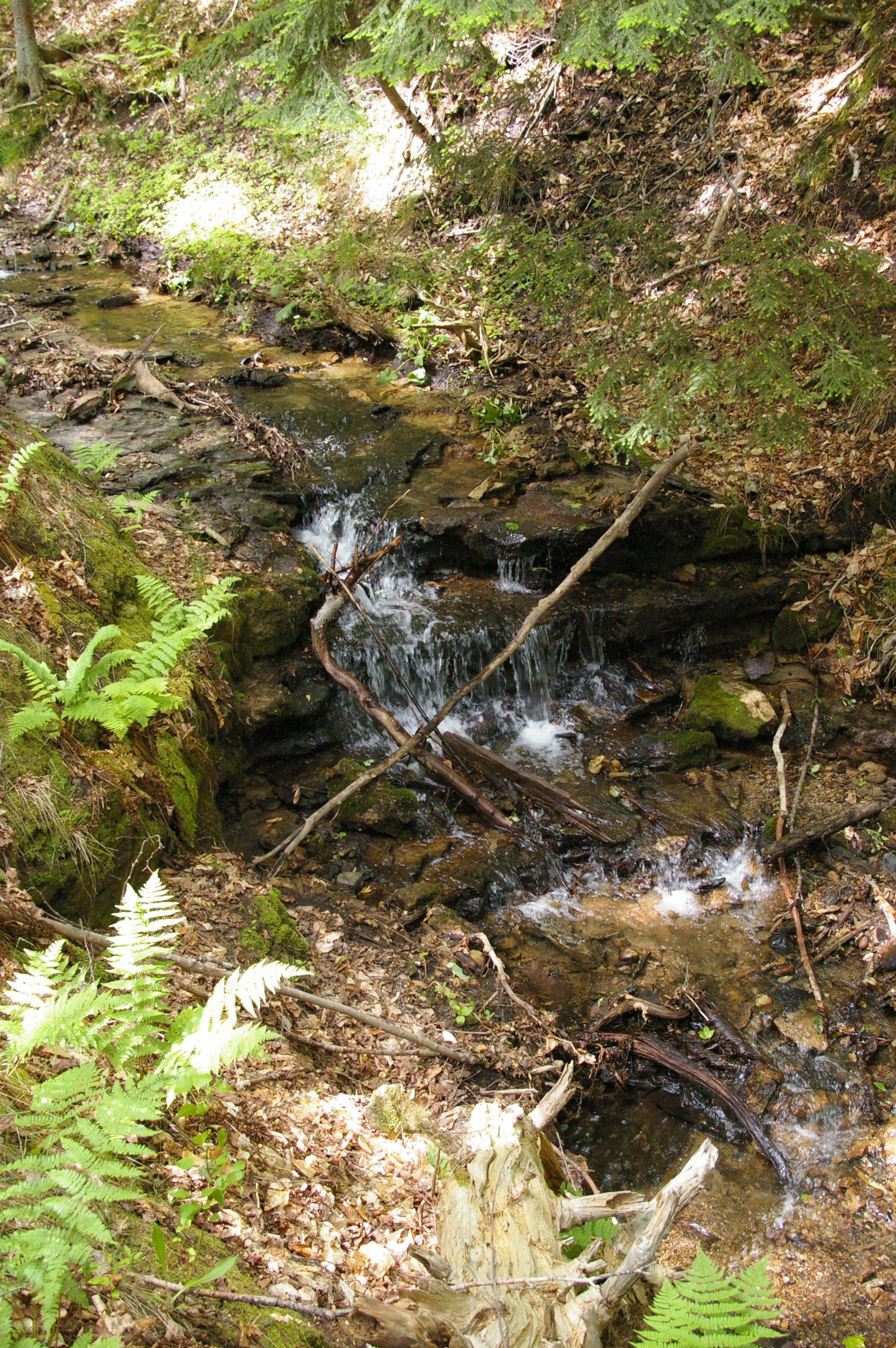
Tannery Creek above the falls

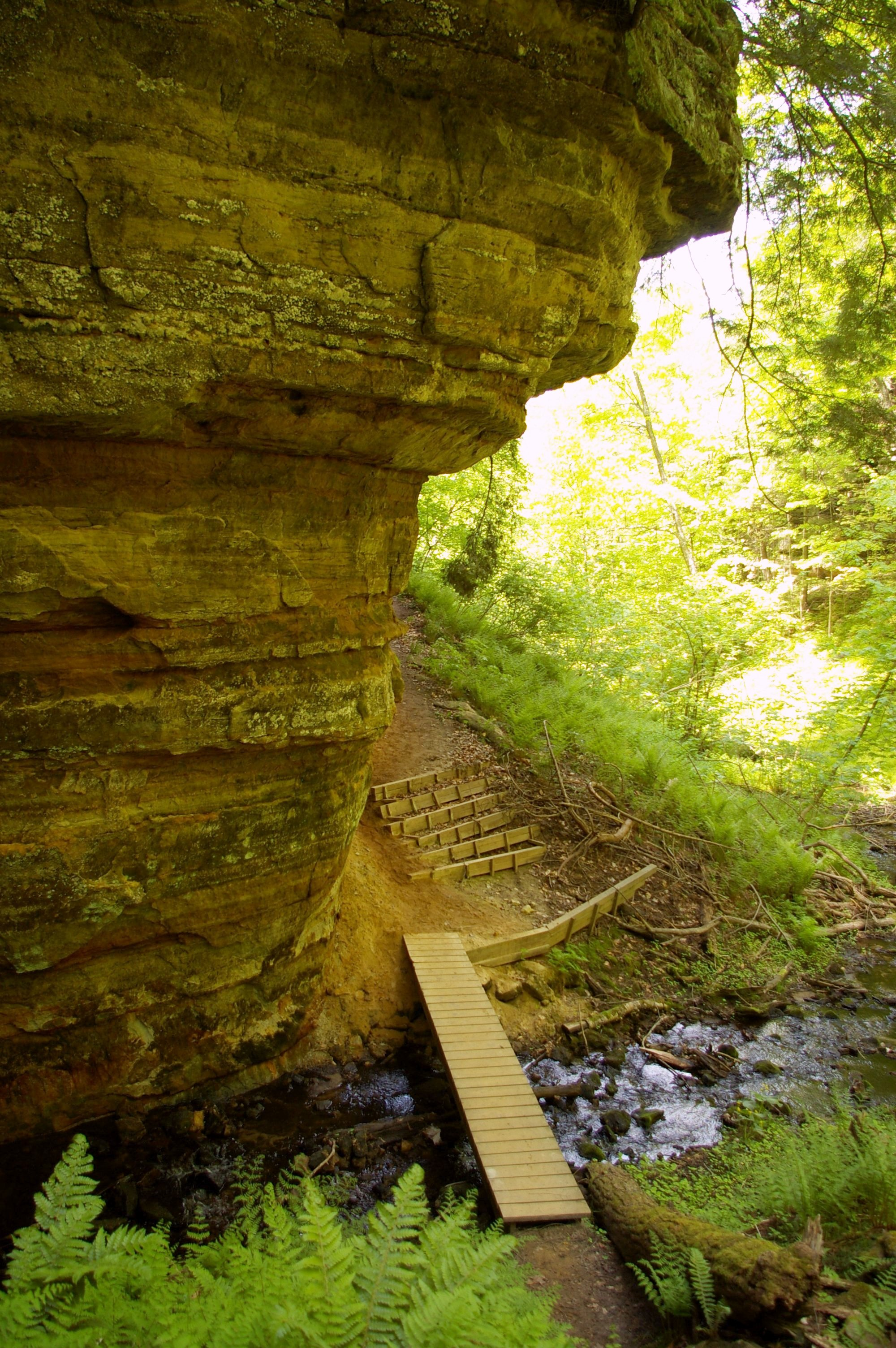
Tannery Creek below the falls

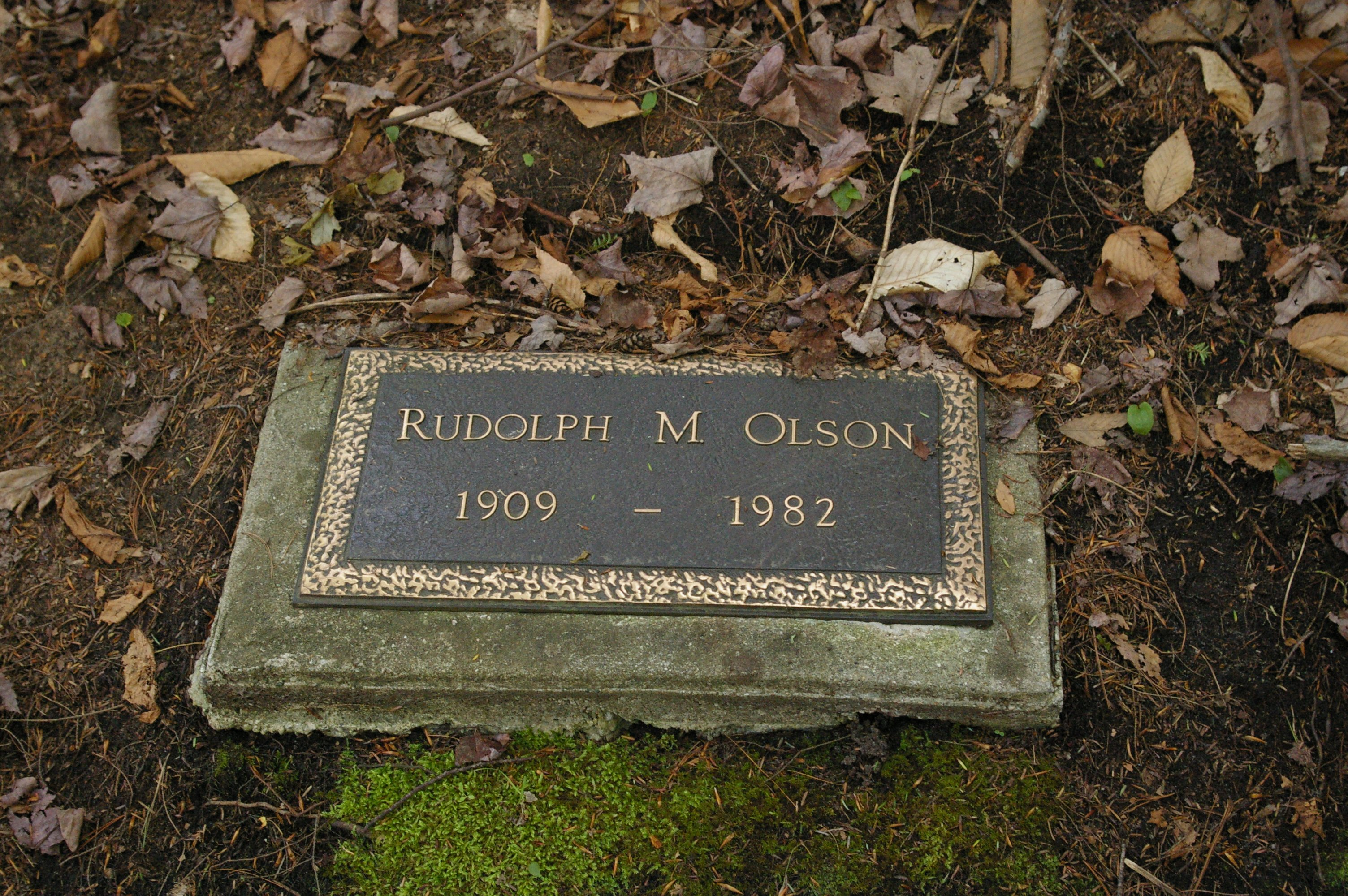
Memorial marker of Rudolf Olson near the entrance to the trail leading to the falls.

Tannery Falls

== See also ==
- List of waterfalls
