= Wagner Falls Scenic Site =

Wagner Falls
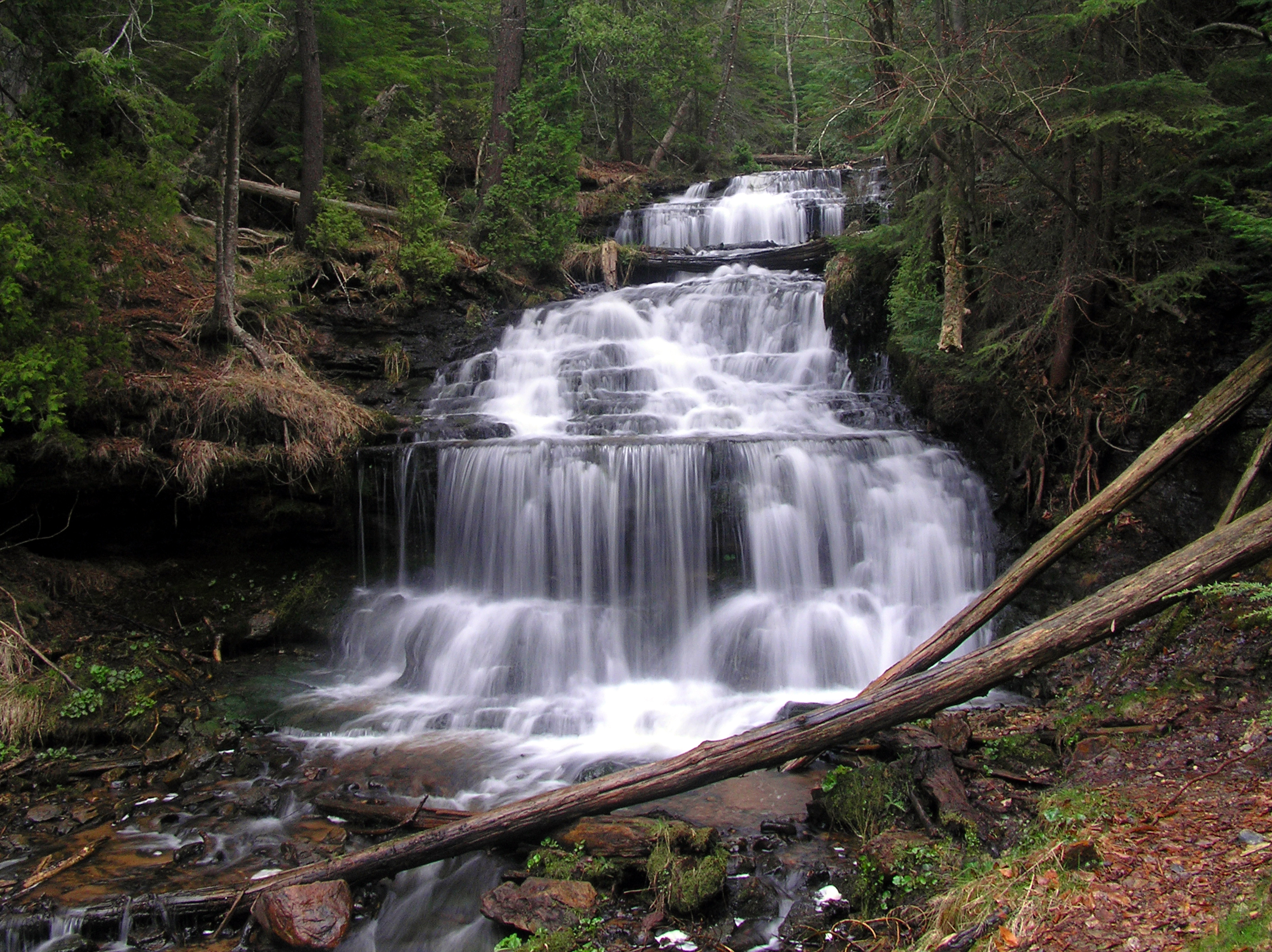
- Wagner Falls
- Interactive map of Wagner Falls
- Location: Alger County, Michigan
- Coordinates: 46°23′16″N 86°38′47″W
- Type: Cascade
- Number of drops: 3
- Watercourse: Wagner Creek

The Wagner Falls Scenic Site is a Michigan State Park, located in central Alger County, Upper Michigan. The 23-acre (0.1 km^{2}) state scenic area protects Wagner Falls.

== Geography ==
The Wagner Falls Scenic Site is 2 miles (3.2 km) south of Munising, in Munising Township, near the junction of Michigan highways M-28 and M-94. It is operated by the Michigan Department of Natural Resources.

== Wagner Falls ==
Wagner Falls is a cascade created by Wagner Creek as it falls over a stratum of erosion-resistant dolomite.

The creek drops into a shallow gorge containing the Anna River. The Anna River then flows northward into Lake Superior.

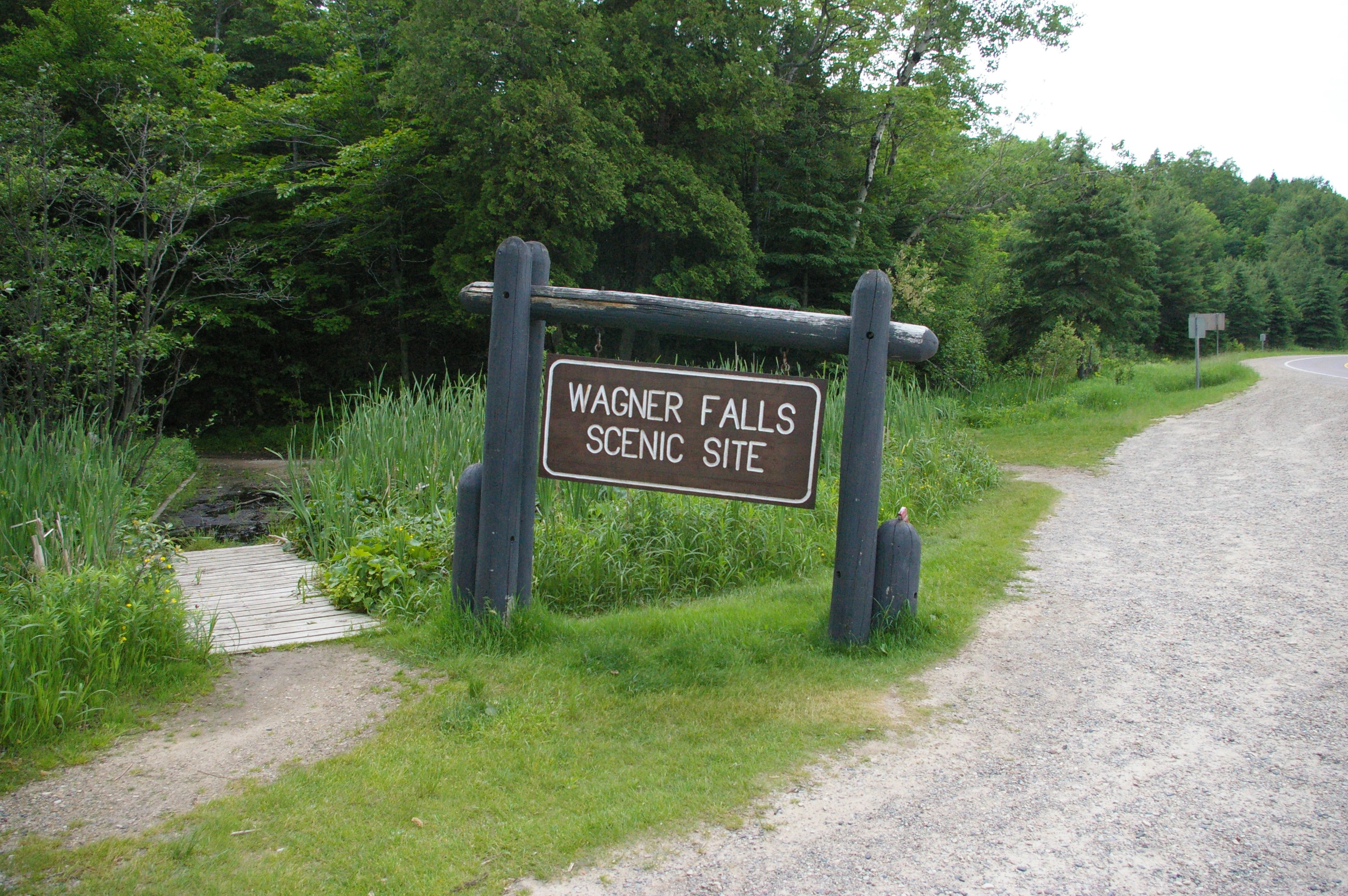
Entrance to the park
