= Grand Island East Channel Light =

Lighthouse in Michigan, United States

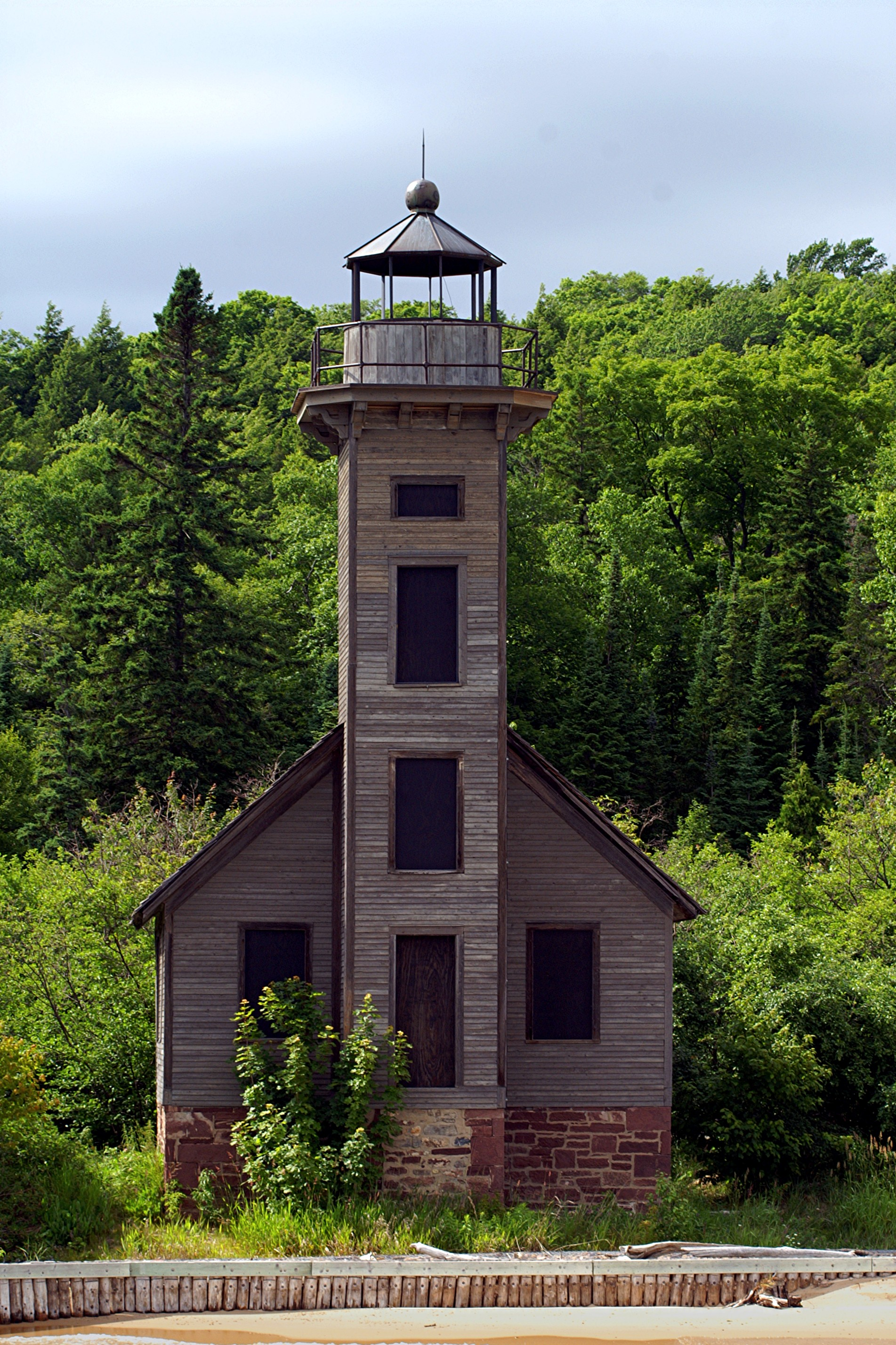
- Grand Island East Channel light in 2009
- Location: Grand Island, Alger County, Michigan
- Coordinates: 46°27.01′N 86°37.345′W

Tower
- Foundation: Brick
- Construction: Wood frame
- Height: 45 feet (14 m)
- Shape: square tower, decagonal lantern, affixed to "schoolhouse" style keeper's residence.
- Markings: White
- Heritage: National Register of Historic Places listed place

Light
- First lit: 1868
- Deactivated: 1908
- Lens: Oil-fired steamer Fifth order Fresnel
- Range: 11.51 nautical miles; 21.32 kilometres (13.25 mi)
- Characteristic: Fixed white
- Grand Island East Channel Lighthouse
- U.S. National Register of Historic Places
- MPS: Historic Engineering and Industrial Sites in Michigan TR
- NRHP reference No.: 80004835
- Added to NRHP: August 29, 1980

The Grand Island East Channel Light is a lighthouse located just north of Munising, Michigan and was intended to lead boats from Lake Superior through the channel east of Grand Island into the Munising Harbor. Constructed of wood, the light first opened for service in 1868. The light was very hard to see from Lake Superior, and light maintenance was very difficult so the Munising Range Lights were constructed (Munising Rear Range Light, Munising Front Range Light) and this light was removed from service in 1908 or 1913 (sources vary).

The lighthouse was severely neglected, and was in danger of being washed away due to erosion. The Grand Island East Channel Lighthouse Rescue Committee was officially formed. Private fund raising was undertaken. Restoration efforts (albeit in "rustic form" not pristine as it was in service) were undertaken. The theory for the lack of paint is that it is more picturesque and attractive to tourists and passing photographers.

As two commentators, lamenting the possible loss of this unique light station, noted in Lighthouse Digest:

It is seen and photographed by thousands of tourists via the Picture Rocks Cruises and Grand Island Charters Glass Bottom Boat tours which make it their first stop on their numerous tours. It appears on sweatshirts, tee-shirts, coffee mugs, post cards, advertisements, and calendars. It is positively one of Michigan's most recognizable landmarks. . . .

In 2000, 85 volunteers worked steadily for thirty days, and completed 75% of a 300-foot-long (91 m) seawall to protect the light. In 2000, the light has been restored and the wall completed.

It is part of a listing on the National Register of Historic Places. It is not listed on the state registry.

== Access ==
The most common way to see the light is to take either of the cruises out of Munising (Shipwreck Tour or Pictured Rocks tour), or Grand Island Cruises, all of which pass by this light and pause for photographers. Alternatively, sea kayak tours of Grand Island are a good way to see this light. Daily trips are available from Memorial Day weekend through October 10. Sea Kayaking is a popular method of exploring the island and is the best way to see it, although it is a serious trip in dangerous and cold water, which should not be undertaken lightly or without proper equipment (dress for the water temperature, not the air temperature). Guides are available. The most efficient port of entry for a sea kayak is from the harbor at Munising.

Out of Munising, Shipwreck Tours and Pictured Rocks Cruises offer boat tours that pass closely by this lighthouse. The ferry to tour Grand Island is available, but does not pass by either Grand Island lighthouses. They are located on private property and are not accessible.

The lighthouse is owned privately, and the grounds, dwelling, and tower are closed to the public.

== See also ==
- Lighthouses in the United States

== Notes ==
1. Reference #80004835. Name of Listing: HISTORIC ENGINEERING & INDUSTRIAL SITES IN MICHIGAN TR.
