= Alger Falls =

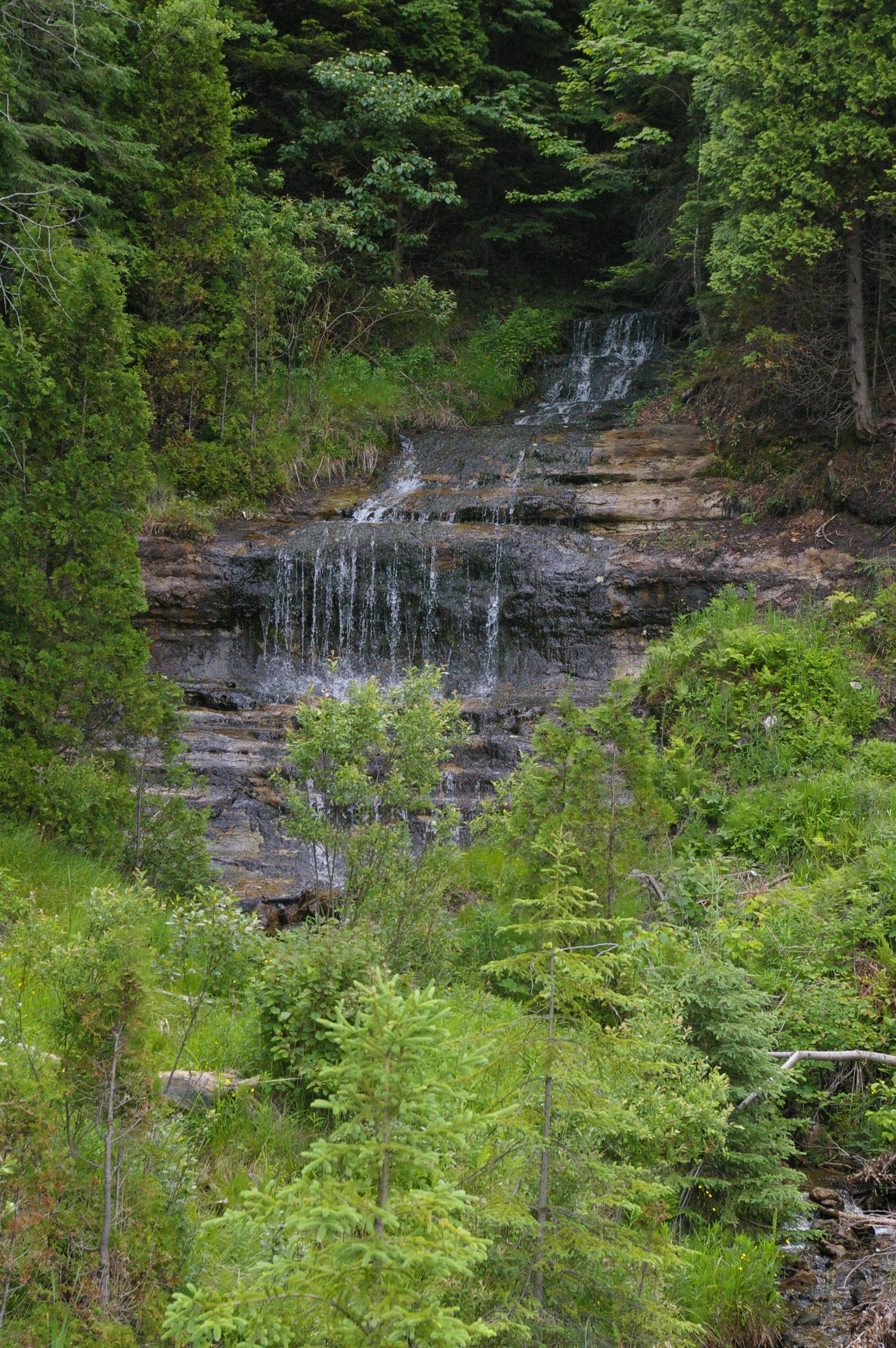
- View of Alger Falls from M-28
- Interactive map of Alger Falls
- Location: Alger County, Michigan
- Coordinates: 46.39295°N 86.64722°W
- Total height: 15 feet (4.6 m)
- Watercourse: Alger Creek

Alger Falls is a waterfall located along highway M-28 (Michigan highway) in Alger County, Michigan near Munising at the junction with M-94. The falls consist of a series of drops, the highest of which is about 15 feet (4.6 m). The falls can be seen from the highway. The level of water coming over the falls can vary greatly depending on snow melt or rainfall.

Alger Falls

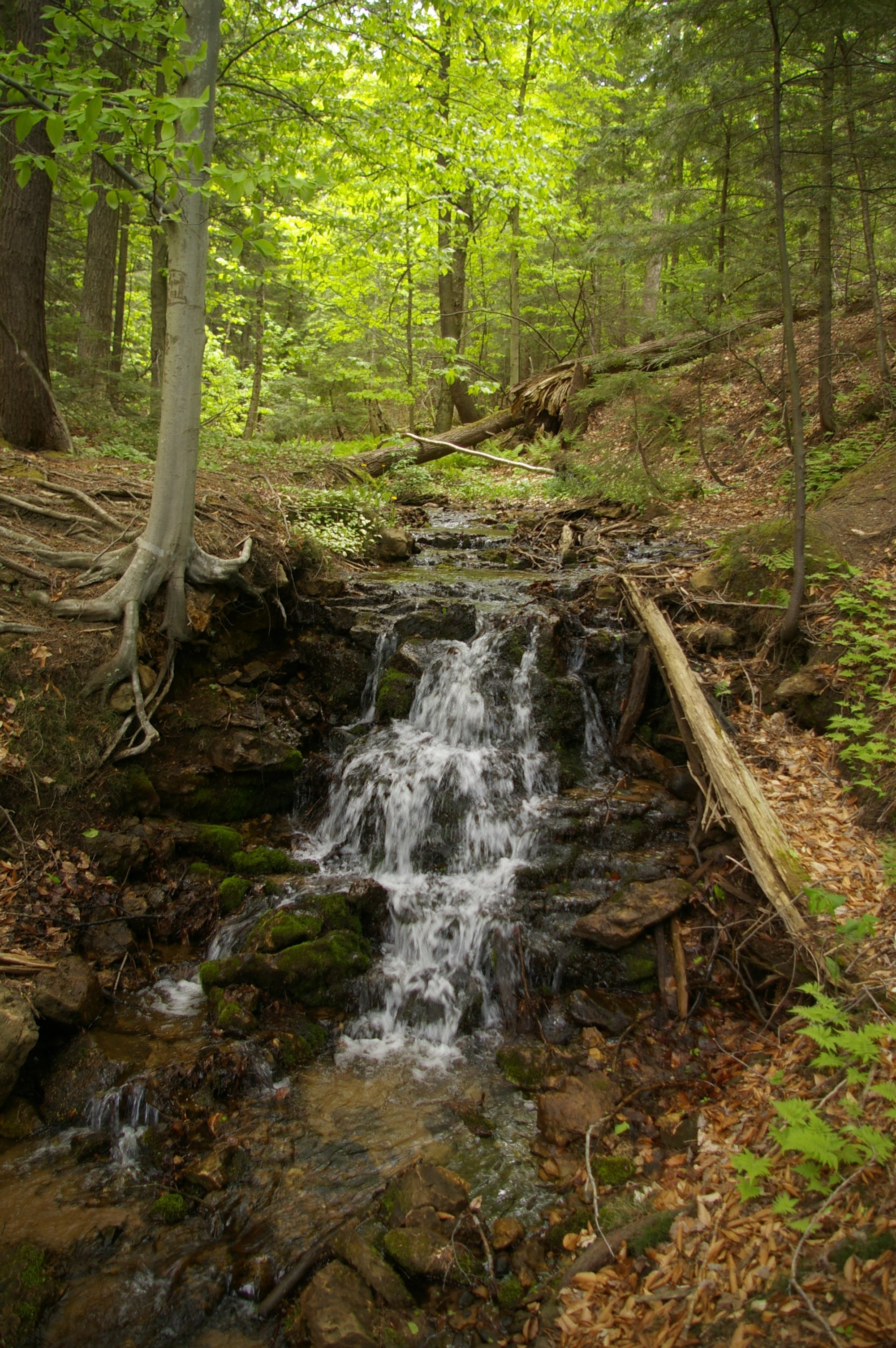
Alger Falls upper section

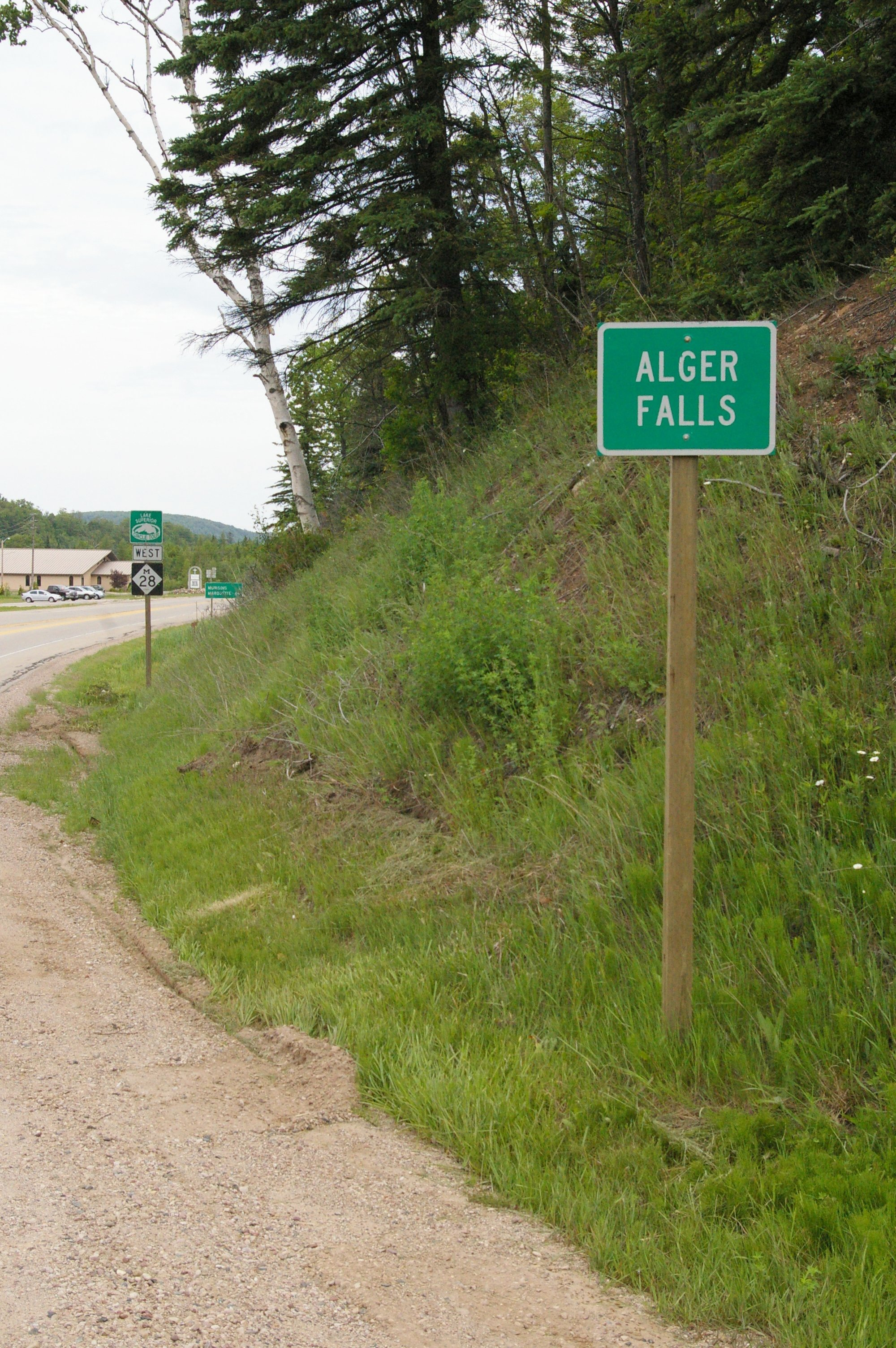
Sign for Alger Falls along M-28
