= Memorial Falls =

Memorial Falls may refer to:

- Memorial Falls (Michigan)
- Memorial Falls (Montana)

== See also ==
- Pioneer Women's Memorial Waterfall
- McArthur–Burney Falls Memorial State Park
