= Grand Island Township, Michigan =

- Civil township
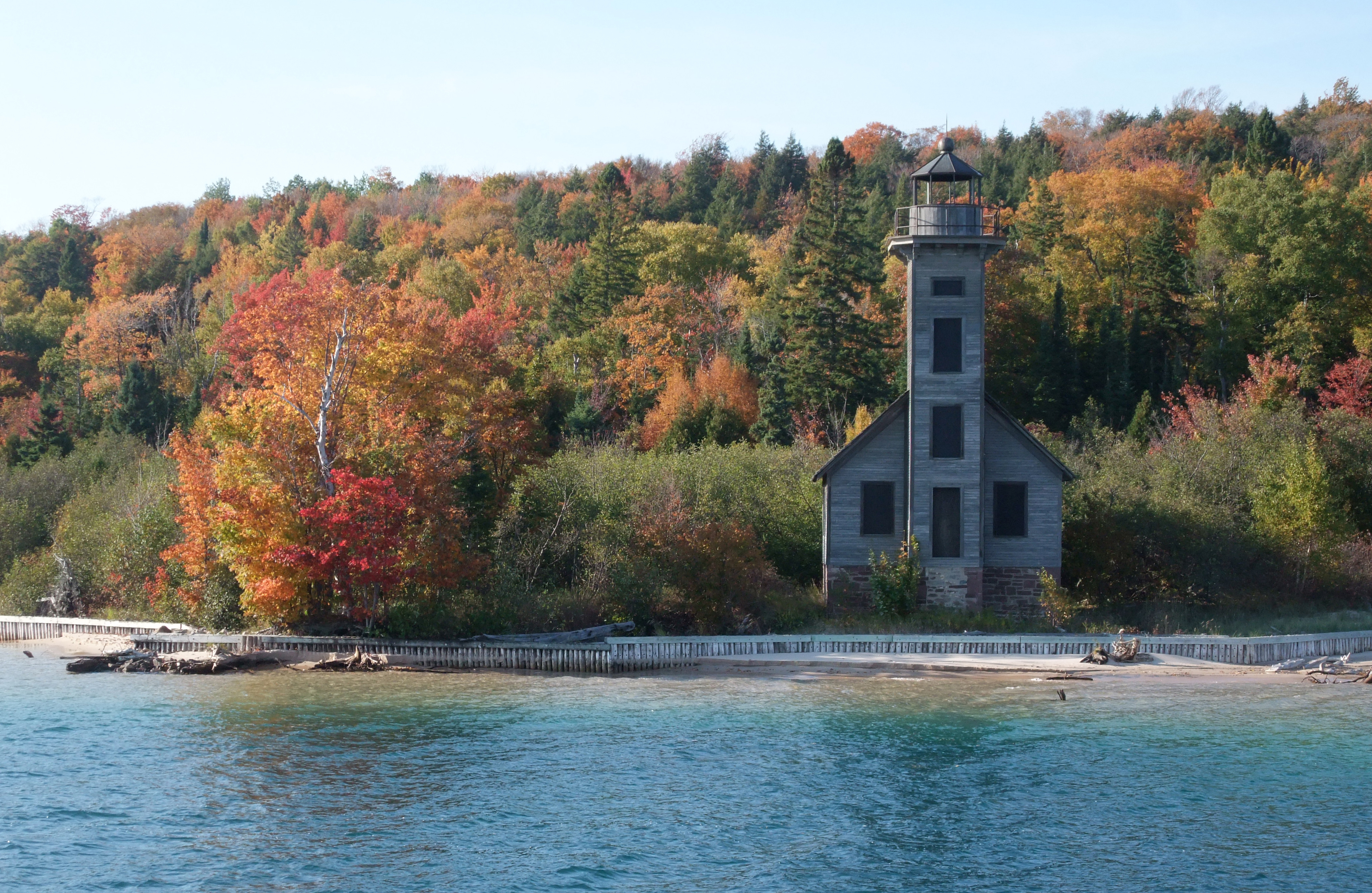
- Grand Island East Channel Light

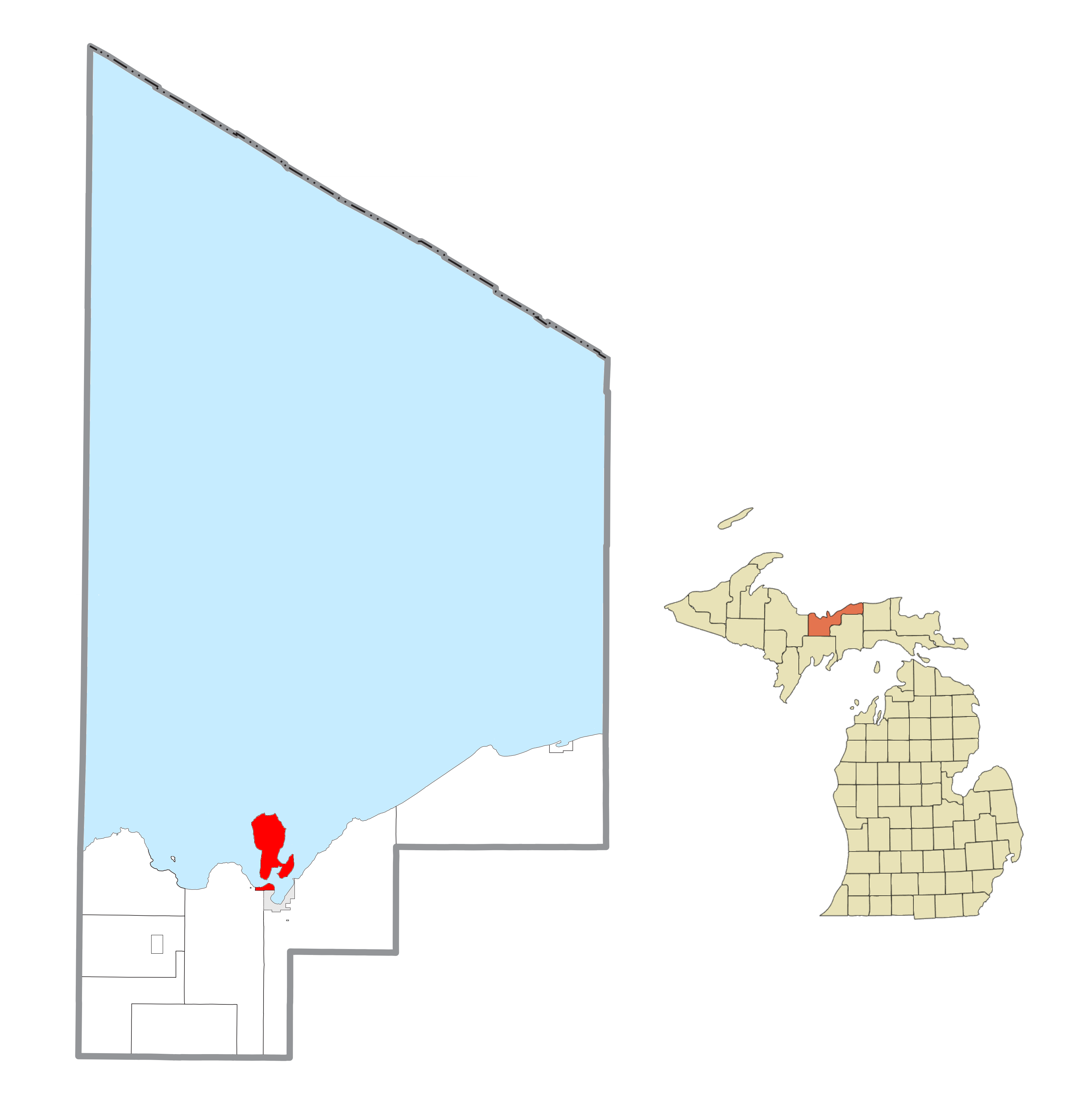
- Location within Alger County

- Location within the state of Michigan Location within the United States
- Coordinates: 46°28′58″N 86°40′36″W
- Country: United States
- State: Michigan
- County: Alger
- Established: 1905

Government
  - Supervisor: Jeff Cromell
  - Clerk: Deanna Boyak

Area
  - Total: 49.1 sq mi (127.1 km^{2})
  - Land: 22.5 sq mi (58.2 km^{2})
  - Water: 26.6 sq mi (68.9 km^{2})
- Elevation: 690 ft (210 m)

Population (2020)
  - Total: 35
  - Density: 2.09/sq mi (0.81/km^{2})
- Time zone: UTC-5 (Eastern (EST))
  - Summer (DST): UTC-4 (EDT)
- ZIP code(s): 49862 (Munising)
- Area code: 906
- FIPS code: 26-33380
- GNIS feature ID: 1626371

Grand Island Township is a civil township of Alger County in the U.S. state of Michigan.

Located along the shores of Lake Superior, the township includes Grand Island, which is designated as the Grand Island National Recreation Area. The township also includes a small portion of the nearby mainland where most of its residents reside along M-28 just north of the city of Munising. At the 2020 census, the township population was 35, which ranked Grand Island Township as the second-least populated municipality in the state after Pointe Aux Barques Township.

== Geography ==
According to the United States Census Bureau, the township has a total area of 49.1 square miles (127.1 km^{2}), of which 22.5 square miles (58.2 km^{2}) is land and 26.6 square miles (68.9 km^{2}), or 54.21%, is water.

=== Communities ===
- Williams Landing is an unincorporated community in the mainland portion of the township at Center Road and Murray Bay.

=== Climate ===
This climatic region is typified by large seasonal temperature differences, with warm to hot (and often humid) summers and cold (sometimes severely cold) winters. According to the Köppen Climate Classification system, Grand Island has a humid continental climate, abbreviated "Dfb" on climate maps.

== Demographics ==
Historical population
Census	Pop.	Note	%±
1960	40		—
1970	32		−20.0%
1980	23		−28.1%
1990	21		−8.7%
2000	45		114.3%
2010	47		4.4%
Source: Census Bureau. Census 1960- 2000, 2010.

As of the census of 2000, there were 45 people, 18 households, and 10 families residing in the township. The population density was 2.0 inhabitants per square mile (0.77/km^{2}). There were 49 housing units at an average density of 2.2 units per square mile (0.85 units/km^{2}). The racial makeup of the township was 95.56% White, 2.22% Native American and 2.22% Asian. 24.1% were of Finnish, 17.2% English, 13.8% German, 6.9% Czechoslovak, 6.9% French Canadian, 6.9% Polish and 6.9% Swedish ancestry. By the 2020 census, its population was 35.

In 2000, there were 18 households, out of which 22.2% had children under the age of 18 living with them, 61.1% were married couples living together, and 38.9% were non-families. 22.2% of all households were made up of individuals, and 5.6% had someone living alone who was 65 years of age or older. The average household size was 2.50 and the average family size was 3.18.

In the township the population was spread out, with 24.4% under the age of 18, 2.2% from 18 to 24, 20.0% from 25 to 44, 28.9% from 45 to 64, and 24.4% who were 65 years of age or older. The median age was 46 years. For every 100 females, there were 80.0 males. For every 100 females age 18 and over, there were 88.9 males.

In 2000, the median income for a household in the township was $76,094, and the median income for a family was $82,500. Males had a median income of $61,250 versus $38,750 for females. The per capita income for the township was $33,892. There were no families and 2.6% of the population living below the poverty line, including no under eighteens and 12.5% of those over 64. The 2021 census estimates determined the township had a median household income of $81,250.
