= Munising, Michigan =

- City
- City of Munising
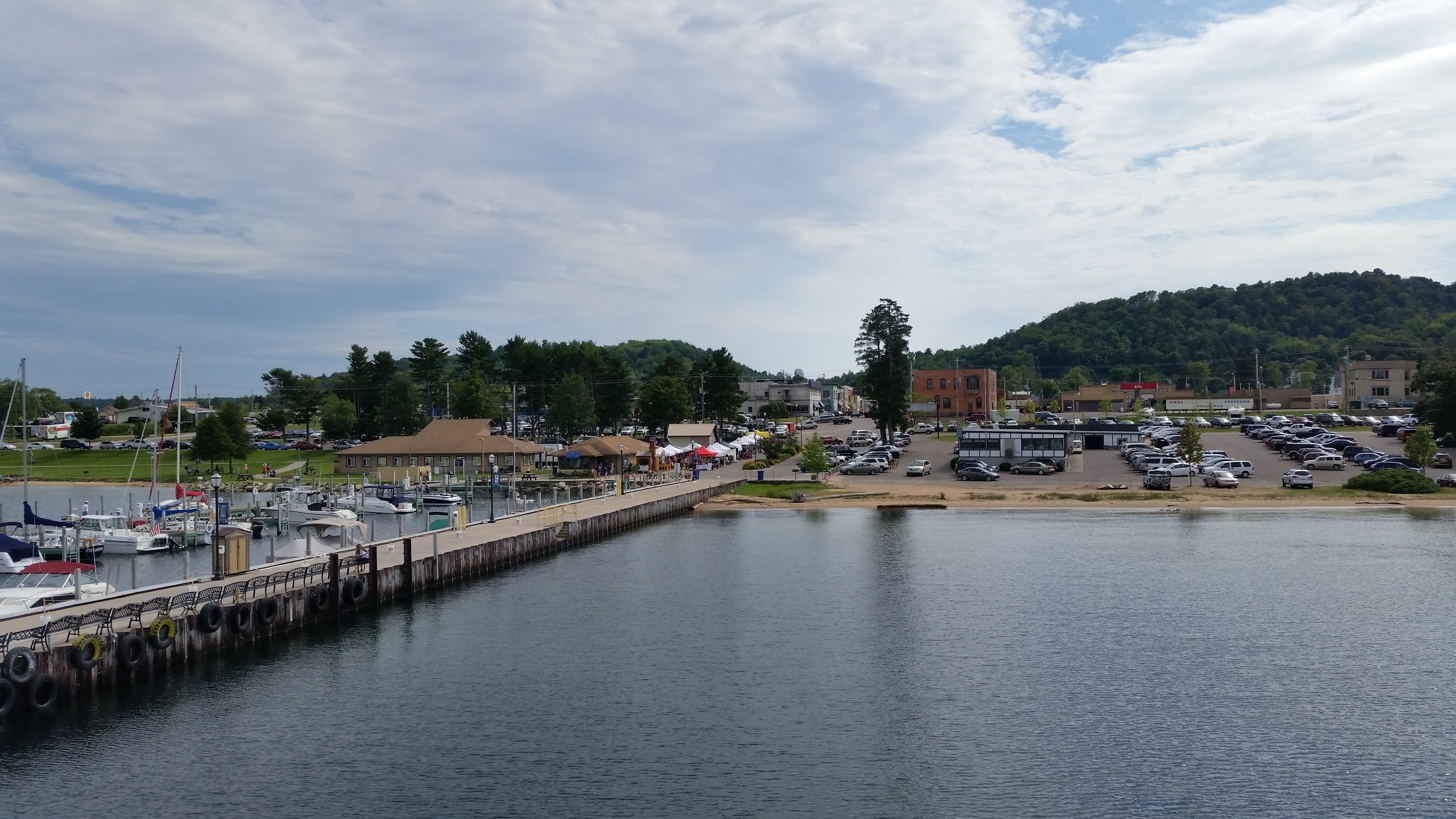
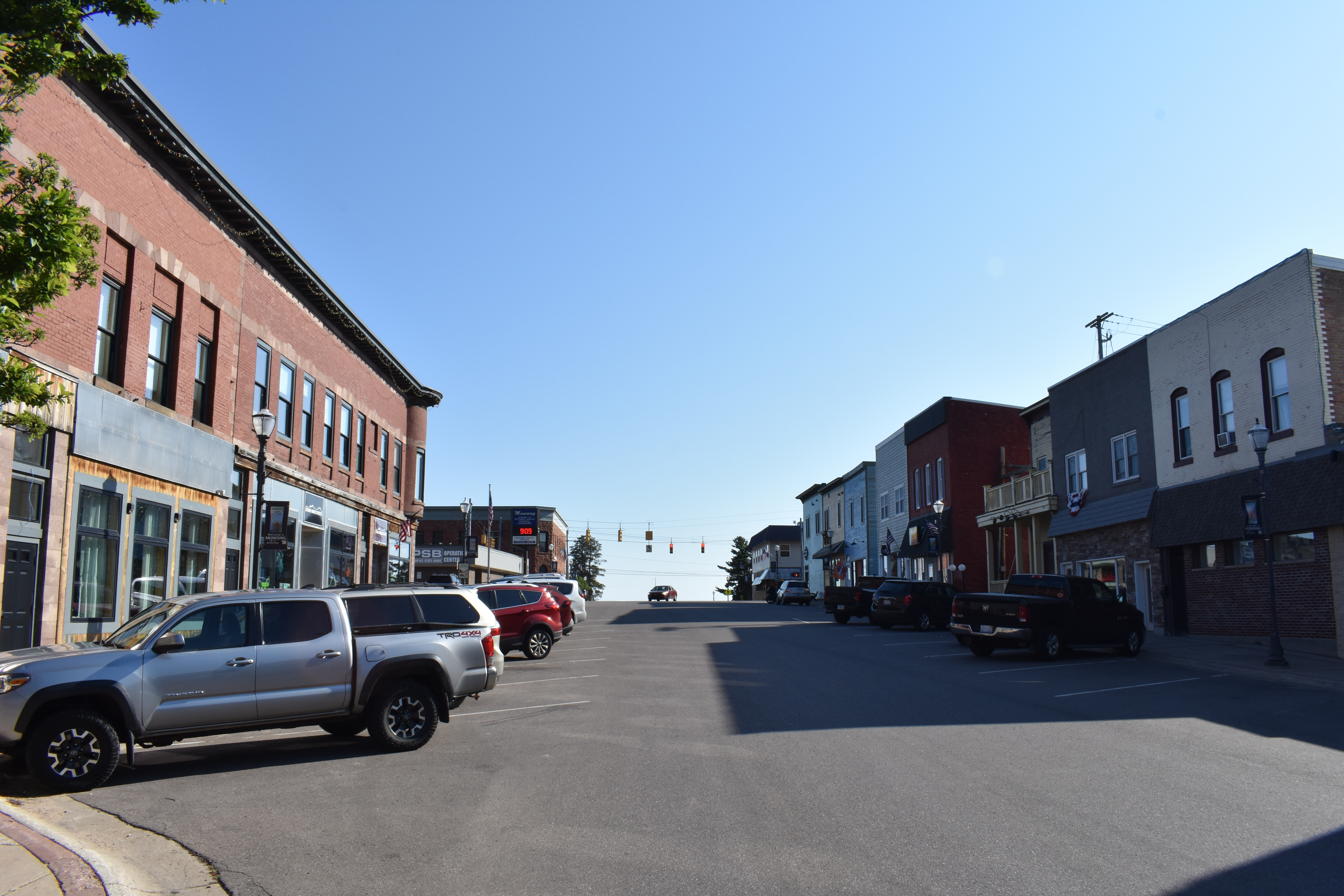
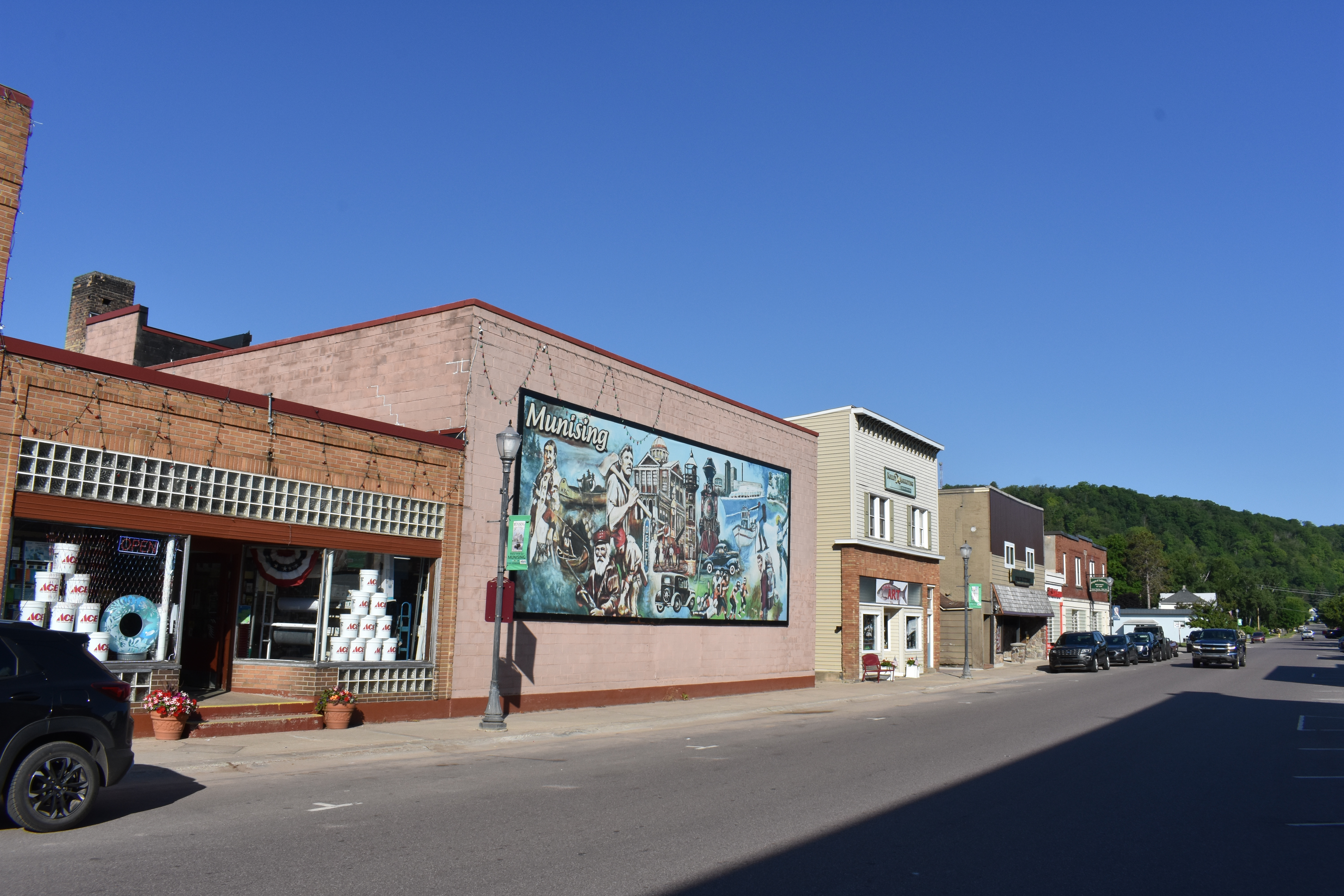
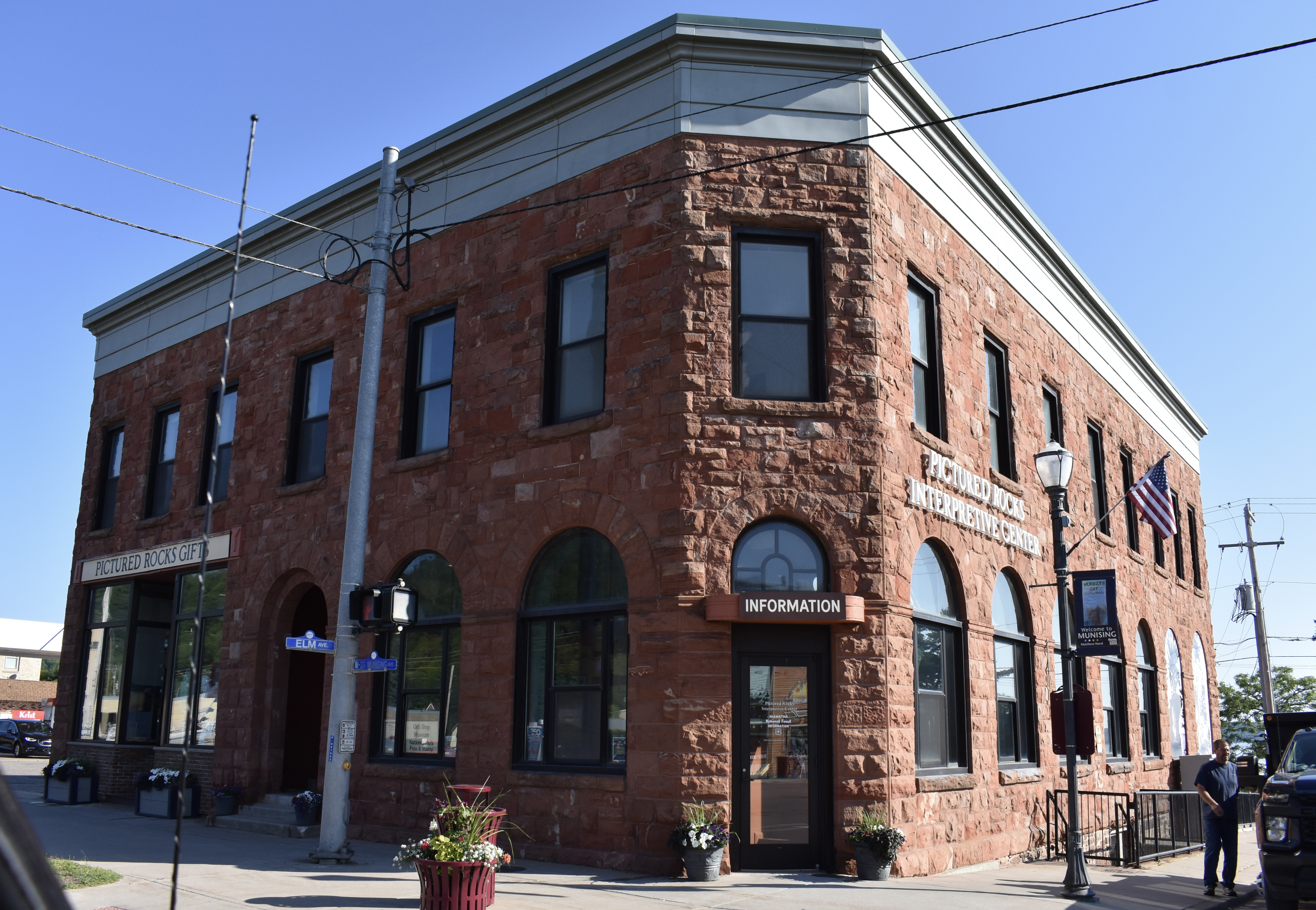
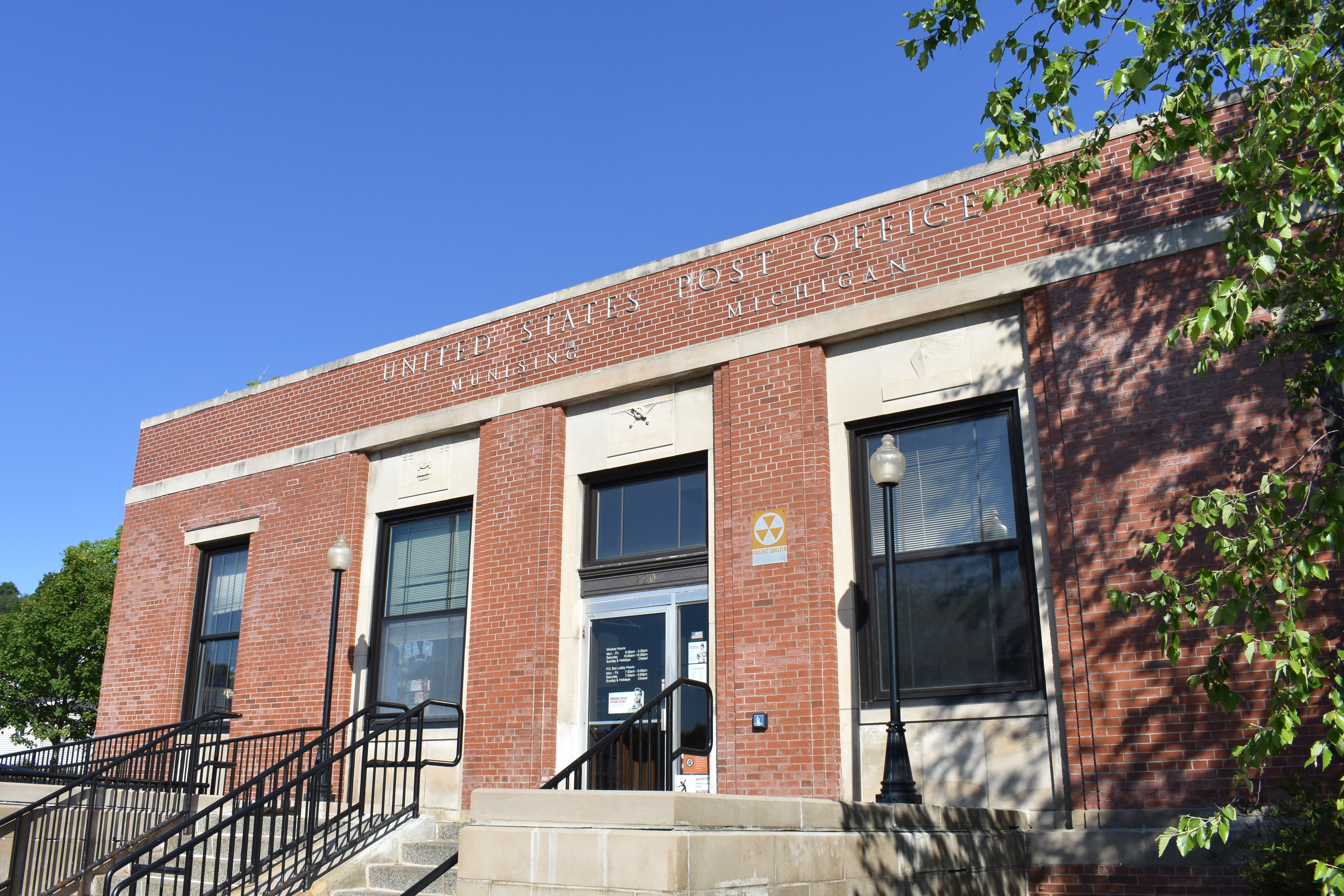
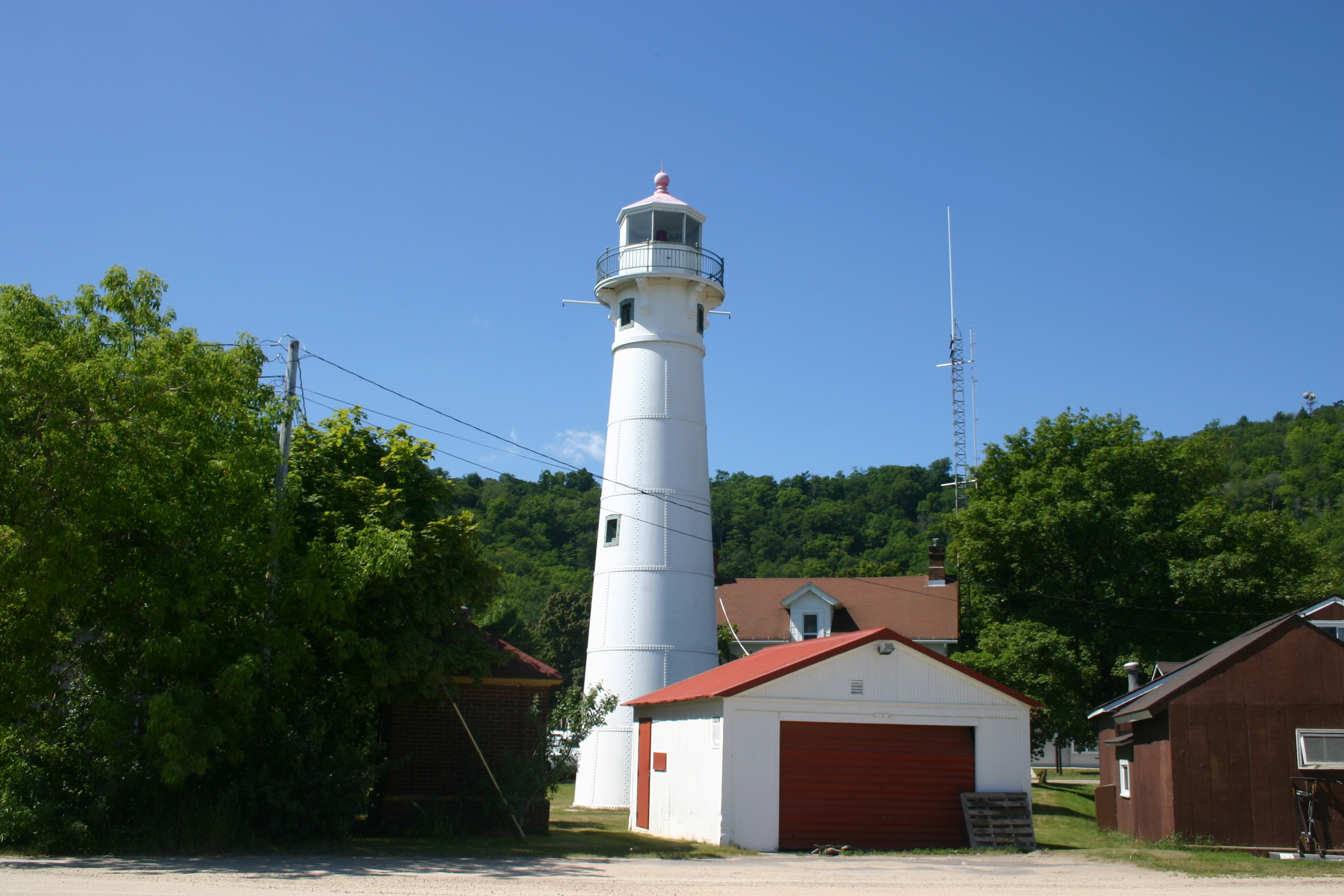
- View of the downtown area from Munising Harbor Elm Avenue Superior Street Pictured Rocks Interpretive Center Post Office Munising Front Range Light

- Seal
- Motto: Gateway to Adventure
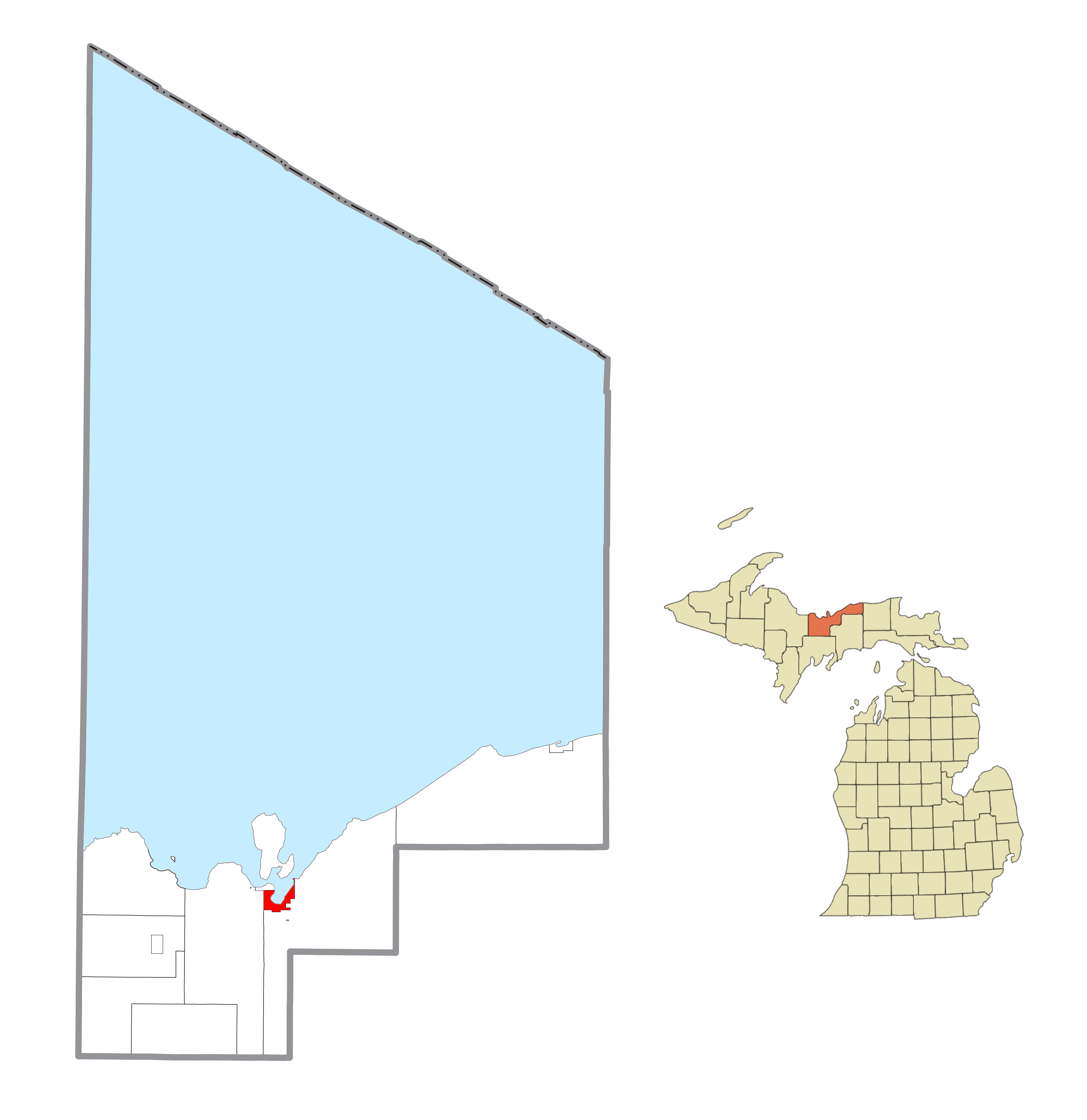
- Location within Alger County

- Location within the state of Michigan Location within the United States
- Coordinates: 46°25′38″N 86°37′45″W
- Country: United States
- State: Michigan
- County: Alger
- Settled: 1855
- Incorporated: 1896 (village); 1915 (city)

Government
  - Type: City commission

Area
  - Total: 9.04 sq mi (23.41 km^{2})
  - Land: 5.26 sq mi (13.62 km^{2})
  - Water: 3.78 sq mi (9.79 km^{2})
- Elevation: 600 ft (180 m)

Population (2020)
  - Total: 1,986
  - Density: 377.7/sq mi (145.84/km^{2})
- Time zone: UTC-5 (Eastern (EST))
  - Summer (DST): UTC-4 (EDT)
- ZIP code(s): 49862
- Area code: 906
- FIPS code: 26-56200
- GNIS feature ID: 1626780
- Website: Official website

Munising (/ˈmjuːnəsɪŋ/ MEW-nə-sing) is a city in the Upper Peninsula of the U.S. state of Michigan. It is the county seat of Alger County. The population was 1,986 at the 2020 census. The city is partially surrounded by Munising Township, but the two are administered autonomously.

Located on the southern shore of Lake Superior in the Upper Peninsula, it serves as the western gateway to Pictured Rocks National Lakeshore.

== History ==
The area encompassing Munising has been inhabited for thousands of years by the Ojibwe and Noquet, who used the low lying grasslands opposite Grand Island to harvest blueberries and other crops. The name for the city comes from the Ojibwe word minisiing, meaning "at the island". A post office was established as the Munising post office on December 22, 1868. It was renamed as Gogarnville on October 23, 1889, when Julius Gogarn was appointed as postmaster. The office was moved to his farm. He was a German-born American Civil War veteran and first Supervisor of Munising Township. That post office continued until July 15, 1893.

== Geography ==
Munising is located on the southern edge of Munising Bay, also known as the South Bay of Grand Island Harbor, across from Grand Island around the mouth of the Anna River. It is the primary embarkation point for cruises to Pictured Rocks National Lakeshore and Grand Island National Recreation Area. Grand Island is located one half mile north in Munising Bay.

According to the United States Census Bureau, the city has a total area of 9.03 square miles (23.39 km^{2}), of which 5.25 square miles (13.60 km^{2}) is land and 3.78 square miles (9.79 km^{2}) is water.

The Munising area has many waterfalls including Alger Falls, Horseshoe Falls, Memorial Falls, Munising Falls, Miners Falls, Scott Falls, Tannery Falls and Wagner Falls.

=== Climate ===
Munising has a warm-summer humid continental climate (Köppen Dfb) with cool to warm summers coupled with cold winters with heavy lake-effect snowfall.

Climate data for Munising, Michigan (1991–2020 normals, extremes 1911–present)
Month	Jan	Feb	Mar	Apr	May	Jun	Jul	Aug	Sep	Oct	Nov	Dec	Year
Record high °F (°C)	58 (14)	57 (14)	82 (28)	89 (32)	95 (35)	97 (36)	103 (39)	103 (39)	99 (37)	87 (31)	70 (21)	60 (16)	103 (39)
Mean daily maximum °F (°C)	23.4 (−4.8)	25.3 (−3.7)	33.4 (0.8)	44.6 (7.0)	58.6 (14.8)	67.6 (19.8)	72.7 (22.6)	72.0 (22.2)	64.6 (18.1)	51.6 (10.9)	39.1 (3.9)	29.0 (−1.7)	48.5 (9.2)
Daily mean °F (°C)	17.4 (−8.1)	18.4 (−7.6)	26.2 (−3.2)	36.6 (2.6)	48.9 (9.4)	58.3 (14.6)	64.1 (17.8)	63.4 (17.4)	56.7 (13.7)	44.6 (7.0)	33.3 (0.7)	23.5 (−4.7)	40.9 (4.9)
Mean daily minimum °F (°C)	11.4 (−11.4)	11.5 (−11.4)	19.0 (−7.2)	28.5 (−1.9)	39.1 (3.9)	49.0 (9.4)	55.4 (13.0)	54.8 (12.7)	48.7 (9.3)	37.7 (3.2)	27.5 (−2.5)	17.9 (−7.8)	33.4 (0.8)
Record low °F (°C)	−27 (−33)	−33 (−36)	−26 (−32)	−15 (−26)	10 (−12)	21 (−6)	31 (−1)	24 (−4)	22 (−6)	4 (−16)	−10 (−23)	−21 (−29)	−33 (−36)
Average precipitation inches (mm)	3.54 (90)	2.38 (60)	2.01 (51)	2.94 (75)	3.08 (78)	3.23 (82)	3.44 (87)	3.15 (80)	4.24 (108)	4.93 (125)	3.47 (88)	3.44 (87)	39.85 (1,012)
Average snowfall inches (cm)	46.0 (117)	32.4 (82)	17.9 (45)	9.6 (24)	0.0 (0.0)	0.0 (0.0)	0.0 (0.0)	0.0 (0.0)	0.0 (0.0)	1.1 (2.8)	14.9 (38)	39.1 (99)	161.0 (409)
Average precipitation days (≥ 0.01 in)	22.0	16.8	12.4	11.4	12.5	11.7	11.9	10.3	14.2	17.6	16.5	18.7	176.0
Average snowy days (≥ 0.1 in)	21.4	16.0	9.0	3.5	0.2	0.0	0.0	0.0	0.0	1.3	8.1	16.2	75.7
Source: NOAA

== Demographics ==
Historical population
Census	Pop.	Note	%±
1880	135		—
1900	2,014		—
1910	2,952		46.6%
1920	5,037		70.6%
1930	3,956		−21.5%
1940	4,409		11.5%
1950	4,339		−1.6%
1960	4,228		−2.6%
1970	3,677		−13.0%
1980	3,083		−16.2%
1990	2,783		−9.7%
2000	2,539		−8.8%
2010	2,355		−7.2%
2020	1,986		−15.7%
U.S. Decennial Census

=== 2020 census ===
As of the 2020 census, Munising had a population of 1,986. The median age was 50.9 years. 17.1% of residents were under the age of 18 and 27.1% of residents were 65 years of age or older. For every 100 females there were 94.7 males, and for every 100 females age 18 and over there were 92.6 males age 18 and over.

0.0% of residents lived in urban areas, while 100.0% lived in rural areas.

There were 918 households in Munising, of which 20.6% had children under the age of 18 living in them. Of all households, 36.4% were married-couple households, 24.1% were households with a male householder and no spouse or partner present, and 31.6% were households with a female householder and no spouse or partner present. About 42.3% of all households were made up of individuals and 21.2% had someone living alone who was 65 years of age or older.

There were 1,198 housing units, of which 23.4% were vacant. The homeowner vacancy rate was 1.3% and the rental vacancy rate was 14.8%.

Racial composition as of the 2020 census
Race	Number	Percent
White	1,762	88.7%
Black or African American	7	0.4%
American Indian and Alaska Native	83	4.2%
Asian	7	0.4%
Native Hawaiian and Other Pacific Islander	0	0.0%
Some other race	10	0.5%
Two or more races	117	5.9%
Hispanic or Latino (of any race)	30	1.5%

=== 2010 census ===
As of the census of 2010, there were 2,355 people, 1,032 households, and 592 families living in the city. The population density was 448.6 inhabitants per square mile (173.2/km^{2}). There were 1,252 housing units at an average density of 238.5 units per square mile (92.1 units/km^{2}). The racial makeup of the city was 91.2% White, 0.2% African American, 4.8% Native American, 0.7% Asian, 0.2% from other races, and 3.0% from two or more races. Hispanic or Latino of any race were 1.4% of the population.

There were 1,032 households, of which 22.9% had children under the age of 18 living with them, 42.0% were married couples living together, 11.0% had a female householder with no husband present, 4.4% had a male householder with no wife present, and 42.6% were non-families. 37.9% of all households were made up of individuals, and 20.2% had someone living alone who was 65 years of age or older. The average household size was 2.13 and the average family size was 2.76.

The median age in the city was 48.6 years. 18.7% of residents were under the age of 18; 6% were between the ages of 18 and 24; 20.5% were from 25 to 44; 28.4% were from 45 to 64; and 26.3% were 65 years of age or older. The gender makeup of the city was 47.4% male and 52.6% female.

=== 2000 census ===
As of the census of 2000, there were 2,539 people, 1,115 households, and 654 families living in the city. The population density was 474.0 inhabitants per square mile (183.0/km^{2}). There were 1,249 housing units at an average density of 233.2 units per square mile (90.0 units/km^{2}). The racial makeup of the city was 93.74% White, 0.16% African American, 3.51% Native American, 0.67% Asian, 0.12% Pacific Islander, 0.08% from other races, and 1.73% from two or more races. Hispanic or Latino of any race were 0.98% of the population. 13.3% were of French, 12.4% German, 11.0% Finnish, 9.9% Polish, 8.8% Swedish, 7.3% French Canadian and 6.8% Irish ancestry according to Census 2000. 97.8% spoke English and 1.6% Spanish as their first language.

There were 1,115 households, out of which 24.4% had children under the age of 18 living with them, 44.8% were married couples living together, 10.2% had a female householder with no husband present, and 41.3% were non-families. 36.3% of all households were made up of individuals, and 19.5% had someone living alone who was 65 years of age or older. The average household size was 2.17 and the average family size was 2.82.

In the city, the population was spread out, with 21.4% under the age of 18, 6.6% from 18 to 24, 23.5% from 25 to 44, 23.4% from 45 to 64, and 25.1% who were 65 years of age or older. The median age was 44 years. For every 100 females, there were 88.8 males. For every 100 females age 18 and over, there were 82.9 males.

The median income for a household in the city was $33,899, and the median income for a family was $46,133. Males had a median income of $41,333 versus $24,444 for females. The per capita income for the city was $19,779. About 7.4% of families and 11.4% of the population were below the poverty line, including 11.6% of those under age 18 and 10.1% of those age 65 or over.

== Transportation ==
- M-28 travels west to Marquette and east to Sault Ste. Marie.
- M-94 travels westerly through Chatham toward Sawyer International Airport south of Marquette, and southerly to Manistique.
- H-11 runs from H-58 just east of the city to Miner's Castle within Pictured Rocks National Lakeshore.
- H-13, a north–south route, terminates at H-58 in the eastern part of the city.
- H-58 begins in downtown Munising and continues northeasterly through Pictured Rocks National Lakeshore.

== Notable people ==
- Connie Binsfeld, 60th Lieutenant Governor of Michigan
- George Snow Hill, painter
- Steven J. Raica, Roman Catholic priest, 5th Bishop of Gaylord, Michigan, 5th Bishop of Birmingham, Alabama
- Brock Strom, professional football player
- James Wickstrom, radio talk show host
- Arthur DeLacy Wood, parole board chairperson

== Gallery ==
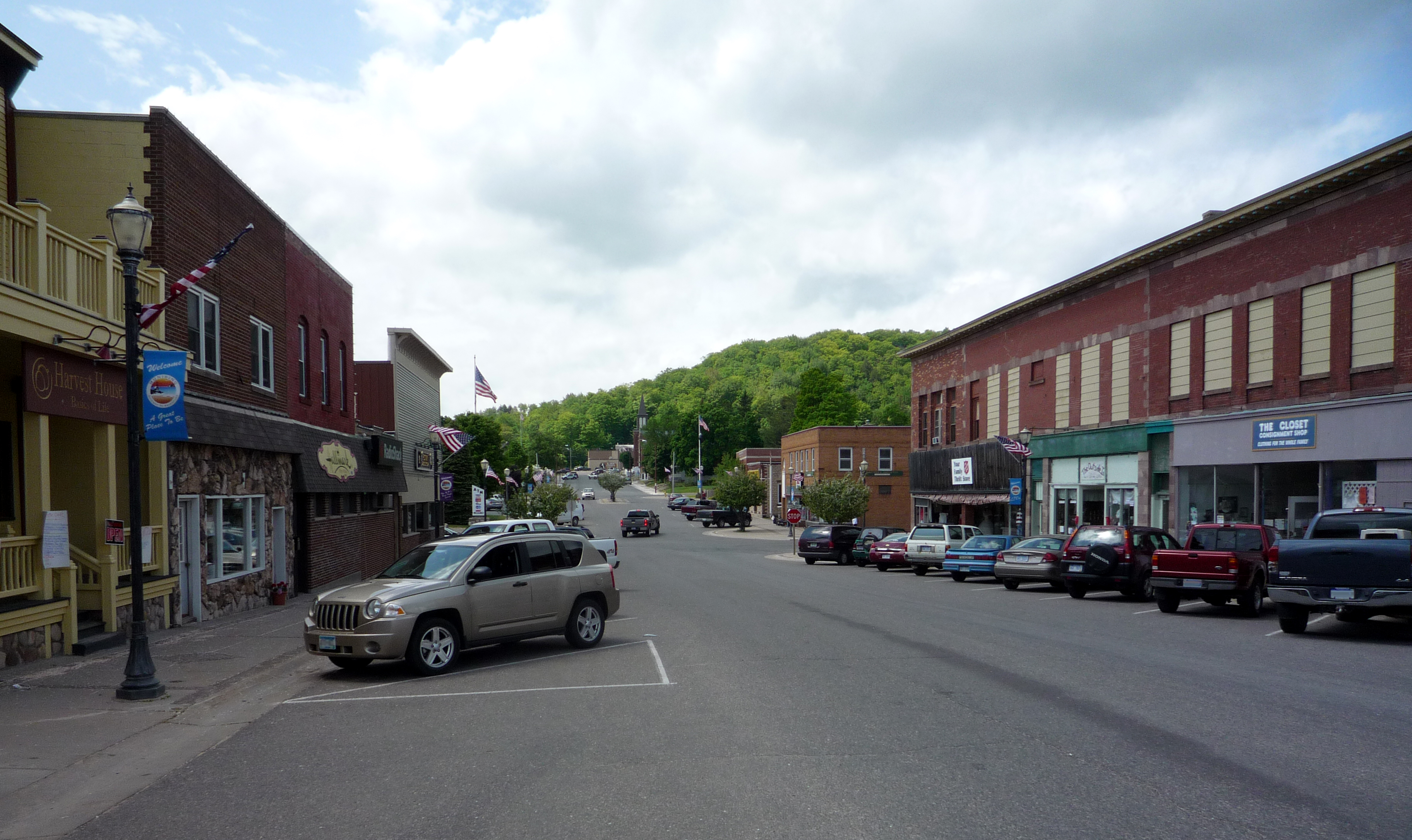
Downtown Munising (Elm Avenue)

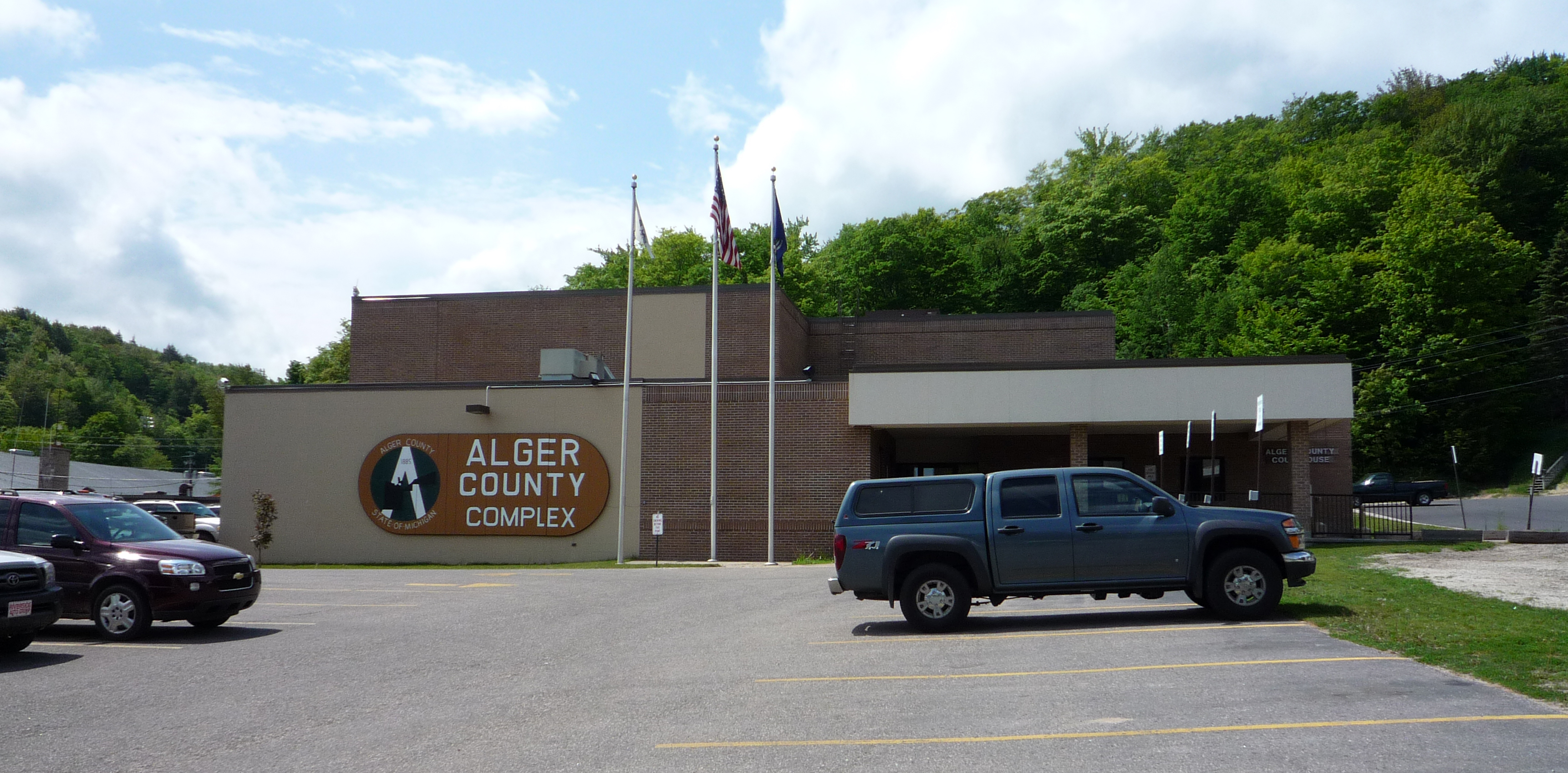
Alger County Courthouse Complex

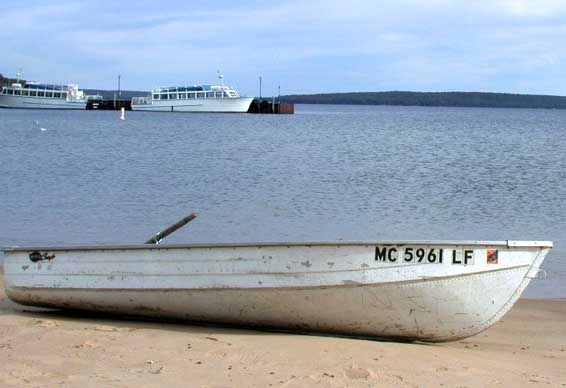
Munising Harbor

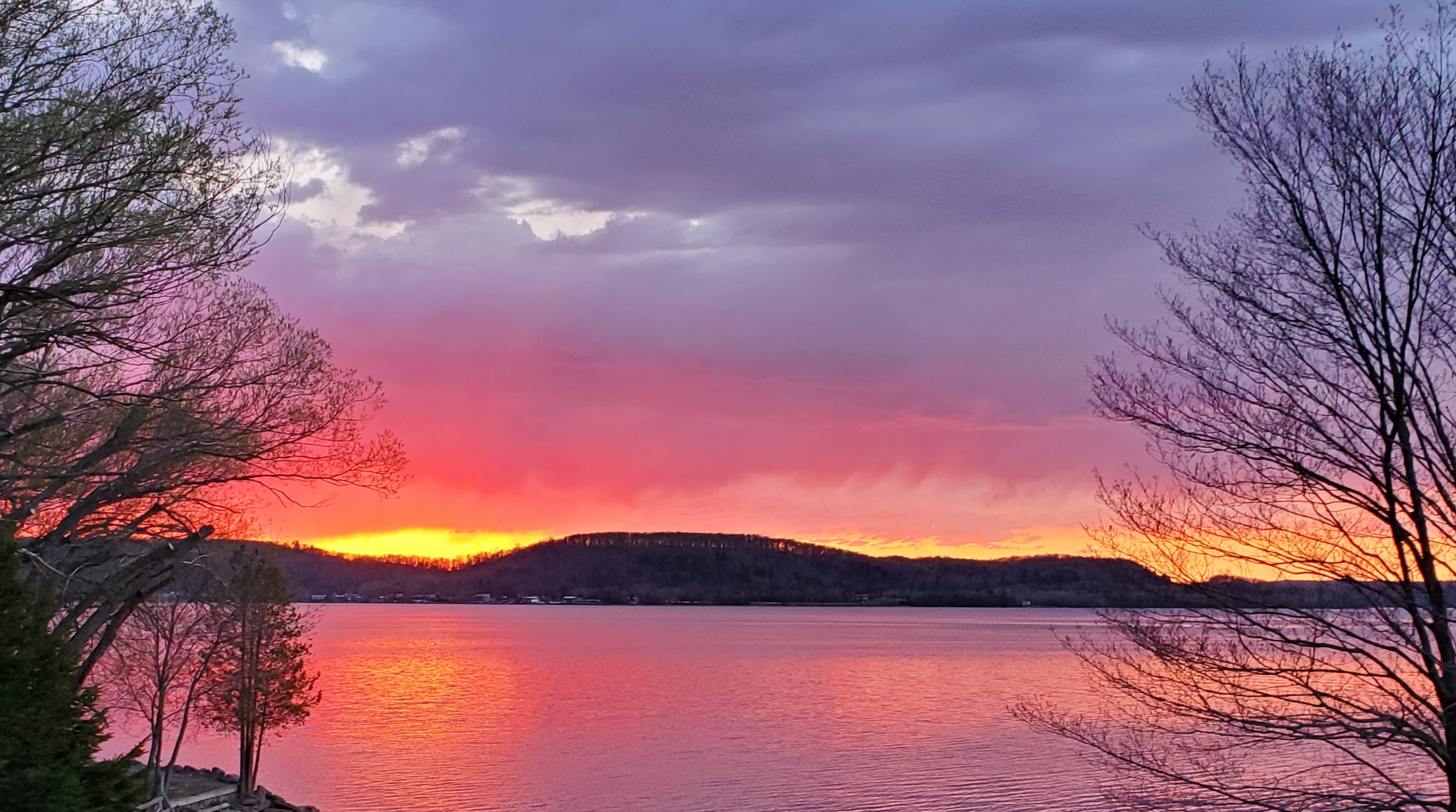
A storm across Munising Bay, seen from the east side
