= Wagner Falls =

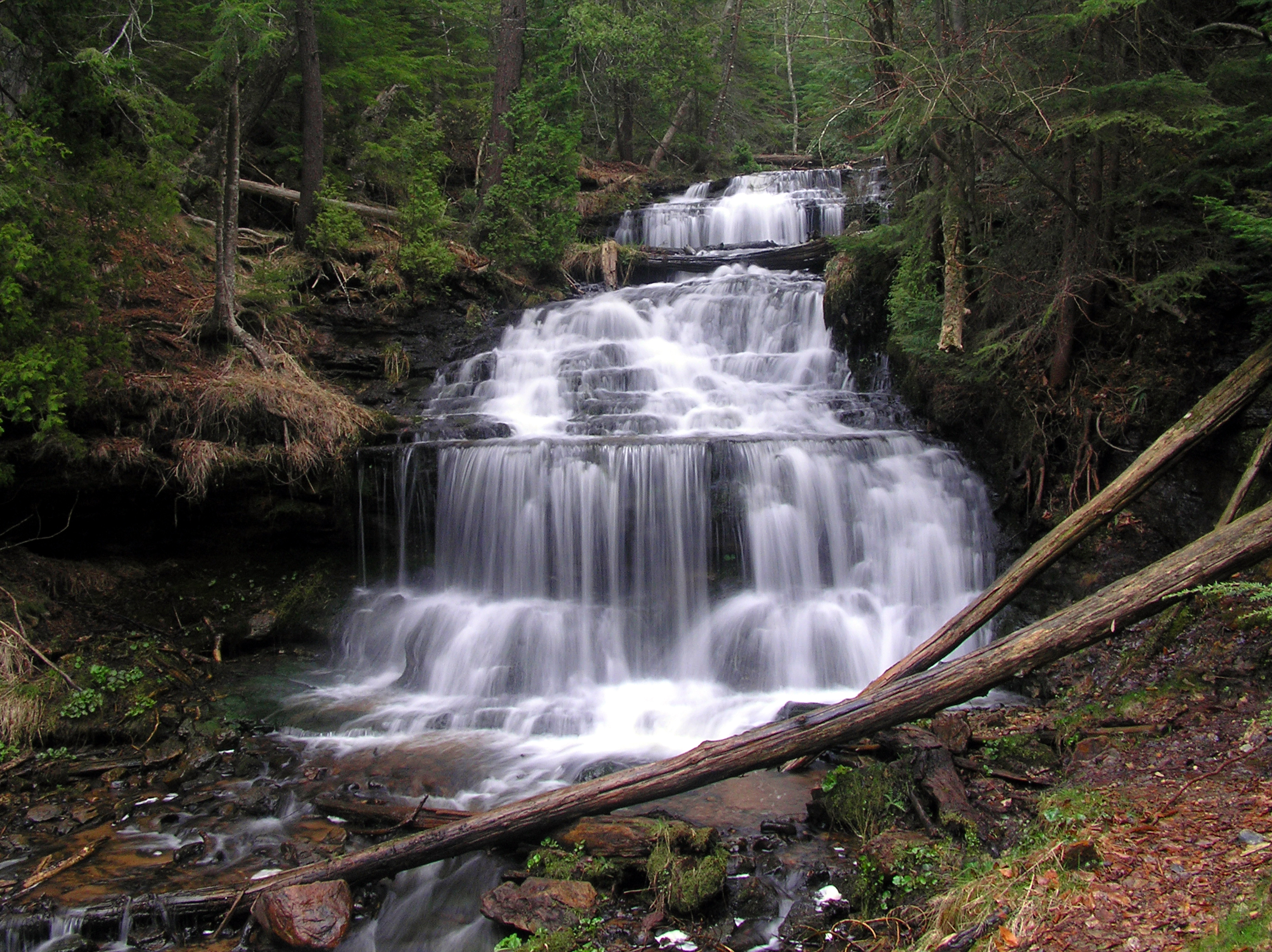
- Wagner Falls
- Interactive map of Wagner Falls
- Location: Alger County, Michigan
- Coordinates: 46.385°N 86.65551°W
- Total height: 20 feet (6.1 m)

Wagner Falls is a waterfall on Wagner Creek near Munising, in Alger County, Upper Michigan. They are in the Wagner Falls Scenic Site, a Michigan State Park of the Michigan Department of Natural Resources.

The falls are located near the junction of M-28 and M-94 and can be reached by a short trail and boardwalk. Water flowing over the falls joins the Anna River below the falls, and flows into Lake Superior near Munising.

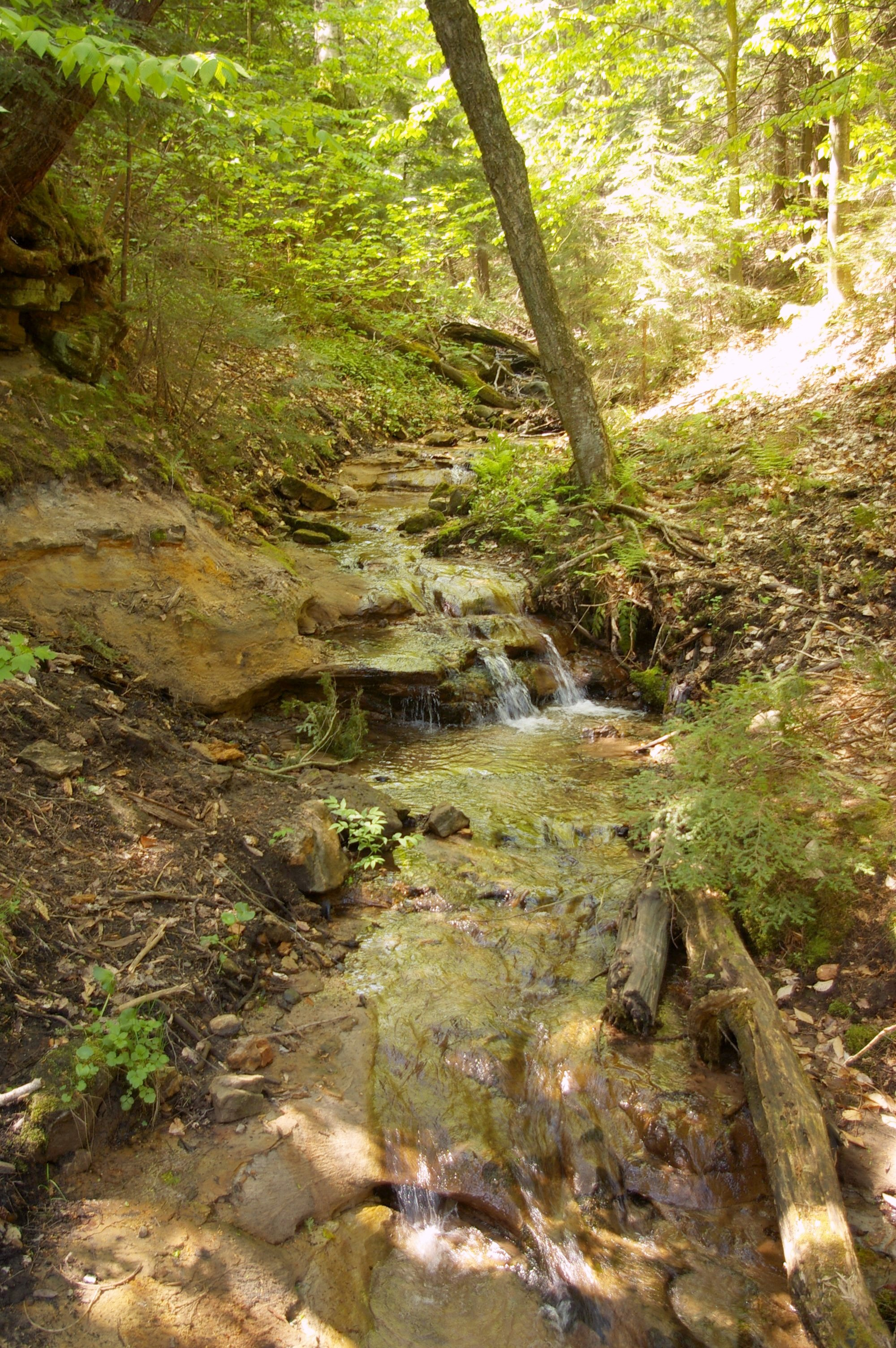
The upper portion of the falls

Video of Wagner Falls
