= SS Western Reserve =

Lake freighter that sank in Lake Superior

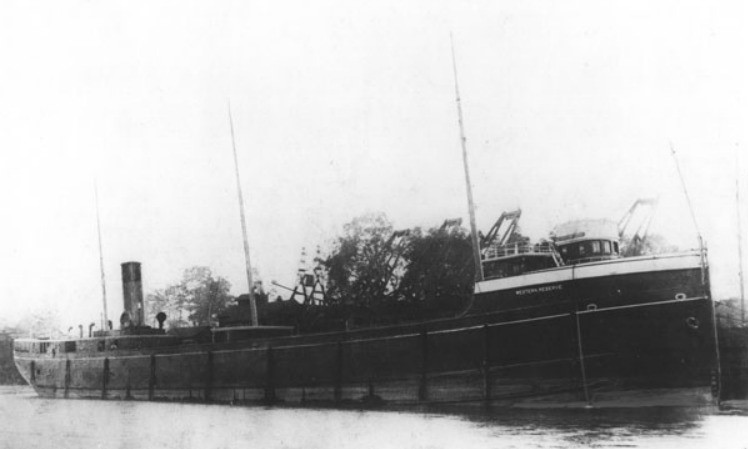
- Western Reserve

History

United States
- Name: Western Reserve
- Namesake: Western Reserve
- Owner: Minch Transportation Co.
- Builder: Cleveland Shipbuilding Co., Cleveland
- Cost: US$200,000
- Yard number: 9
- Launched: August 20, 1890
- Maiden voyage: October 6, 1890
- Home port: Cleveland
- Identification: US Official Number 81294
- Fate: Sank, August 30, 1892

General characteristics
- Type: Bulk carrier
- Tonnage: 2,392.05 GRT; 1,965.08 NRT; 3,000 DWT
- Length: 300 ft 7 in (91.62 m)
- Beam: 41 ft 2 in (12.55 m)
- Depth: 21 ft 0 in (6.40 m)
- Propulsion: Cleveland Shipbuilding Co. 3-cylinder triple expansion
- Speed: 12 knots (14 mph; 22 km/h)

SS Western Reserve was the first steel plate lake freighter on the Great Lakes. She was constructed in 1890 by the Cleveland Shipbuilding Company for and invented by Peter G. Minch, a ship's captain, designer and operator who was pioneering the industrialization of bulk carrier freight service on the Great Lakes. She had a length of 301 feet (92 m), a beam of 41 feet (12 m) and drew 21 feet (6.4 m) of water making her at the time the largest bulk carrier on the lakes. She and a similar ship, SS W.H. Gilcher, were the two first lake freighters to be constructed out of steel plate. Her steel construction made it possible for the vessel to carry heavier loads faster than wooden steamships. The Western Reserve was called the "inland greyhound" because she was so fast from port to port.

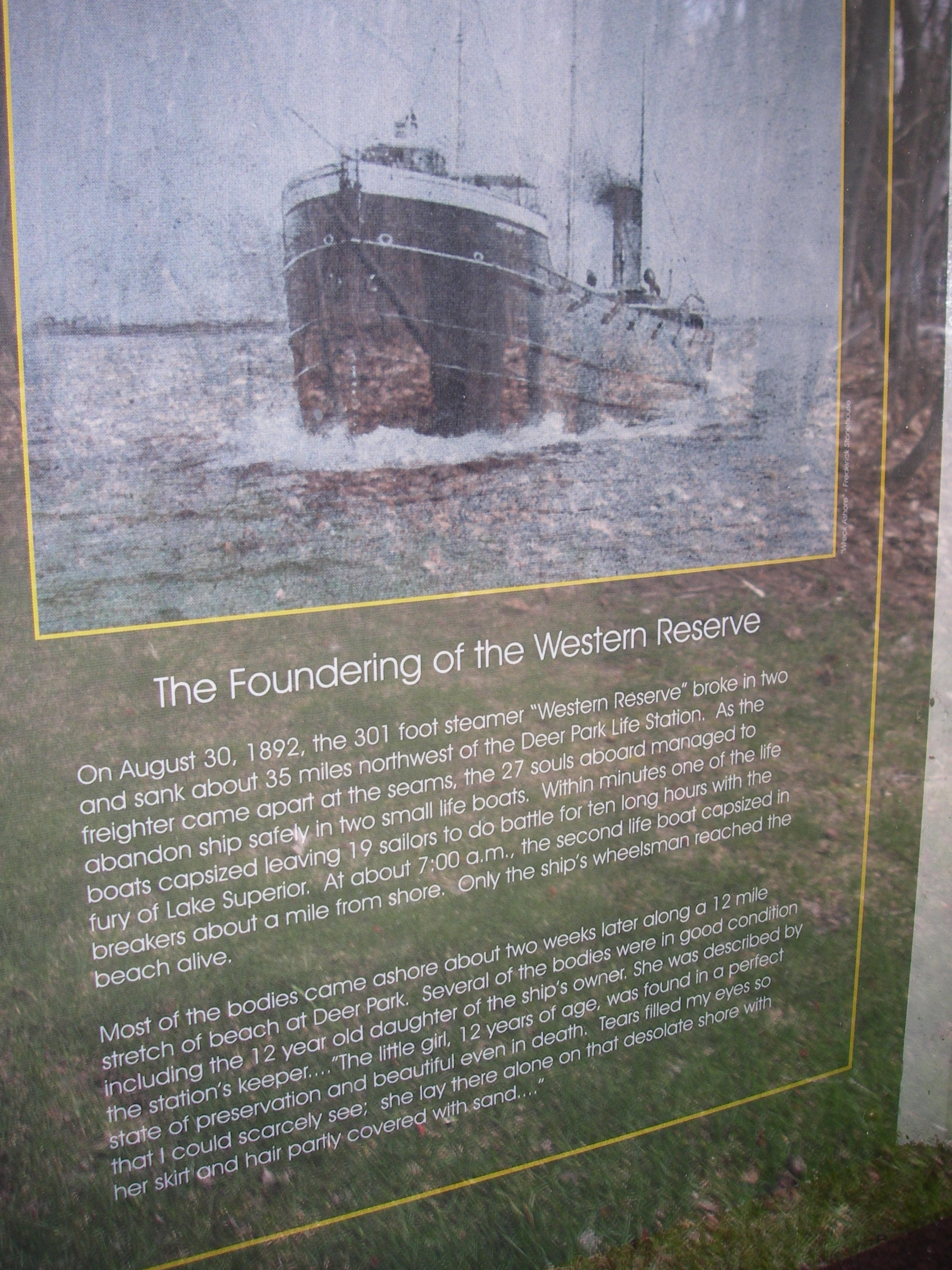
A commemorative plaque of Western Reserve in Muskallonge Lake State Park

== History ==
On August 30, 1892, in Lake Superior, Western Reserve was loaded with ballast and traveling upbound to Two Harbors, a port serving the Minnesota iron ranges, for a load of iron ore. At 9 p.m., she ran into a storm about 60 miles (97 km) above Whitefish Point. With a loud crash, the ship broke in two and sank within 10 minutes. All 21 crew and six passengers were able to get off in two lifeboats. Seventeen people, including Captain Minch and his family, got in the wooden boat. The remaining 10 people got into a metal lifeboat, which then capsized. The wooden boat was only able to pick up two survivors from the metal lifeboat. The wooden lifeboat remained afloat until about 7 a.m. when it also capsized, about one mile (1.6 km) from shore. All were drowned except for wheelsman Harry Stewart, who with considerable effort swam to shore. He lay bedraggled on the beach somewhere between Grand Marais and Deer Park, "almost unconscious" for an hour, before he half crawled 10 miles (16 km) to a lifesaving station. He attributed his survival to a heavy knit close fitting pea jacket which he said "alone saved him".

Experts disagree whether the Western Reserve's construction or design contributed to the breakup. Some believed it sank due to "hogging", where the middle of the ship is lifted by a large wave leaving the two ends hanging in mid-air, causing the middle to snap like a twig—the ship was simply too long without adequate structural support. Others pointed to the location of the superstructure at both ends, most big ships at the time had the superstructure in the middle to help hold it together. Upon being debriefed, Stewart's descriptions led to accusations of brittle steel. This was during the early days of maritime steel, which was not designed to gracefully handle the twisting and stretching forces of waves. The Titanic used the same type of steel as the Western Reserve, and similar accusations of brittle steel were made after that disaster.

Eight weeks after the Western Reserve disaster, W.H. Gilcher—which had been built at the same time with similar mill runs of steel plate—disappeared on northern Lake Michigan. The disasters, loss of life, including a well-known shipowner, and ensuing scandal led to permanent changes in the types of steel approved for use in U.S. and Canadian shipbuilding.

The ship's location remained unknown for 132 years. Beginning in 2022, the Great Lakes Shipwreck Historical Society's research vessel, David Boyd, began systematically searching for the shipwreck in a grid pattern with side-scanning sonar. In the summer of 2024, after two years of effort, the hulk was finally found laying 600 feet (180 m) deep off the coast of Whitefish Point. According to the society, underwater video revealed "it was broken almost straight in half. The way it sank, the bow fell right on top of the stern." It confirmed Harry Stewart's eyewitness report the ship broke straight in half ― many at the time didn't believe it was possible. The discovery was not publicly announced until March 10, 2025, after the society contacted the descendants of Captain Minch, a distant relative of the Steinbrenner family.

== See also ==
- Graveyard of the Great Lakes
