= M-77 (Michigan highway) =

State highway in Schoolcraft and Alger counties in Michigan, United States

M-77
- M-77 highlighted in red

Route information
- Maintained by MDOT
- Length: 42.602 mi (68.561 km)
- Existed: c. July 1, 1919–present
- Tourist routes: Lake Superior Circle Tour Scenic Spur

Major junctions
- South end: US 2 near Blaney Park
- M-28 in Seney; H-58 in Grand Marais
- North end: Braziel Street in Grand Marais

Location
- Country: United States
- State: Michigan
- Counties: Schoolcraft, Alger

Highway system
- Michigan State Trunkline Highway System; Interstate; US; State; Byways
| ← M-76 | → M-78 |

M-77 is a state trunkline highway in the Upper Peninsula (UP) of the US state of Michigan. It starts at US Highway 2 (US 2) near Blaney Park north of Lake Michigan. The highway borders the eastern edge of the Seney National Wildlife Refuge and passes through the community of Germfask. At Seney, it overlaps M-28 to cross the Fox River before returning northward. The northern half has been designated as a Scenic Spur of the Lake Superior Circle Tour. M-77 runs along the eastern end of the Pictured Rocks National Lakeshore and terminates in Grand Marais north of H-58 near Lake Superior. Originally designated by 1919, the highway has not been changed much in its history. By the late 1950s, the highway was paved, completing the modern M-77 highway.

== Route description ==
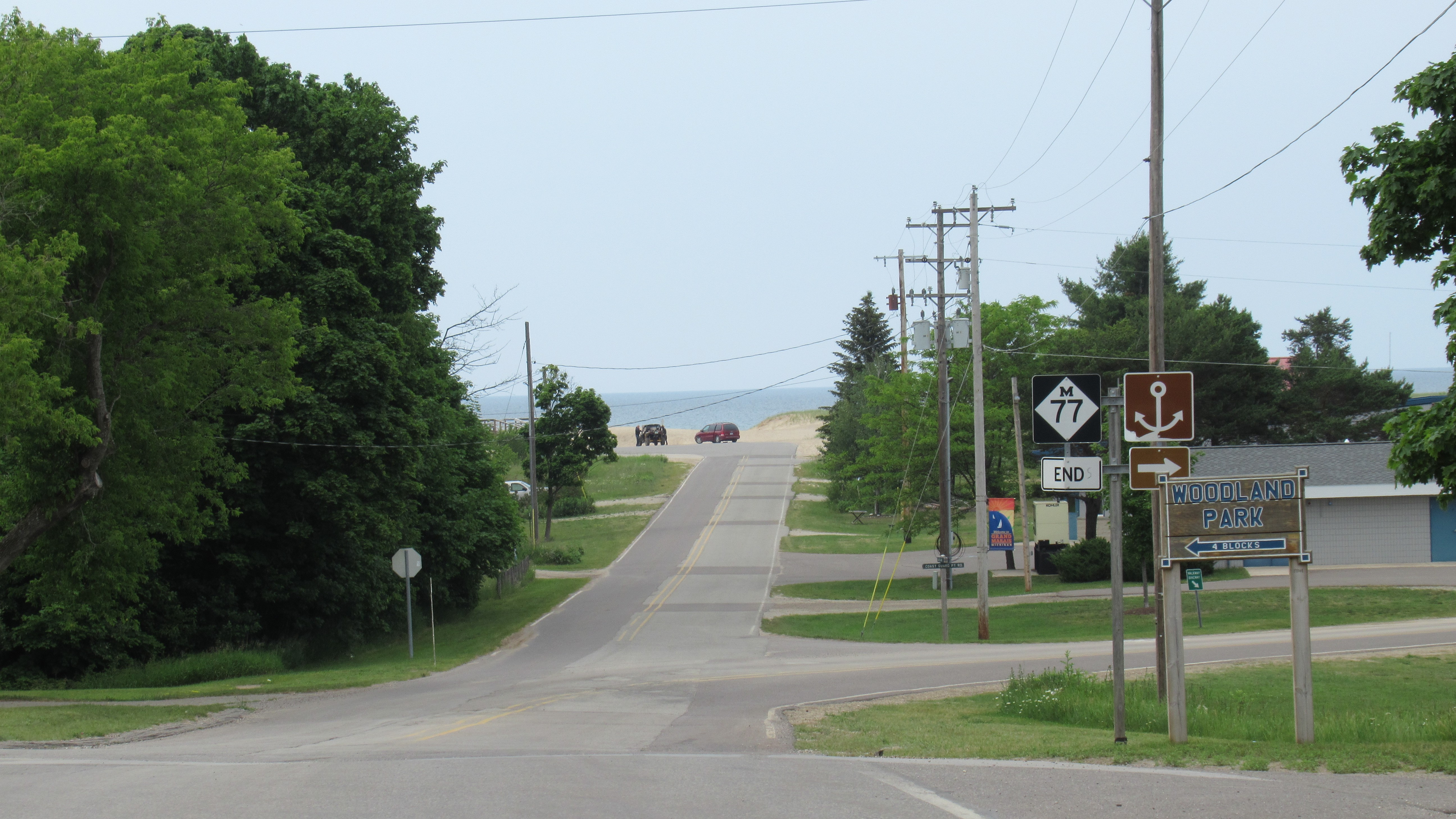
Northern terminus within Grand Marais

From US 2 near Blaney Park going north, M-77 runs past the former Blaney Park Resort and out of town by a small private airport next to Lake Ann Louise. The highway continues through rural woodlands past Chip Lake. The road crosses the Manistique River as it runs through Germfask. From just south of Germfask to just south of Seney, the road forms the eastern boundary of the Seney National Wildlife Refuge.

The refuge is a managed wetland in Schoolcraft County in Michigan. Established in 1935, it has an area of 95,212 acres (38,531 ha) bordered by M-28 and M-77 that is the remains of the Great Manistique Swamp, a perched sand wetland located in the central UP. The refuge contains the Strangmoor Bog National Natural Landmark within its boundaries. During the 1930s, work crews employed by the Civilian Conservation Corps (CCC) rebuilt, restored, and expanded the wetland drains, this time for active wetlands management purposes. These CCC ponds and drains are still used by the wetlands managers that staff the current National Wildlife Refuge.

At Seney, M-77 crosses a line of the Canadian National Railway and turns east along M-28. Both run concurrently for less than half a mile (0.8 km) over a crossing of the Fox River before M-77 turns back northward. About 11 miles (18 km) north of Seney, the road turns sharply to the west, near Snyder Lake. The trunkline continues along several other lakes before turning northeasterly and then northward. The road marks the easternmost extent of the Pictured Rocks National Lakeshore around 2.5 miles (4.0 km) south of Grand Marais. Within Grand Marais, the highway follows Lake Avenue through downtown. M-77 intersects H-58 in town and the two designations run concurrently for two blocks. The trunkline continues one block farther north and ends at an intersection with Braziel Street by the Grand Marais harbor; the roadway continues northward as Lake Avenue at that point.

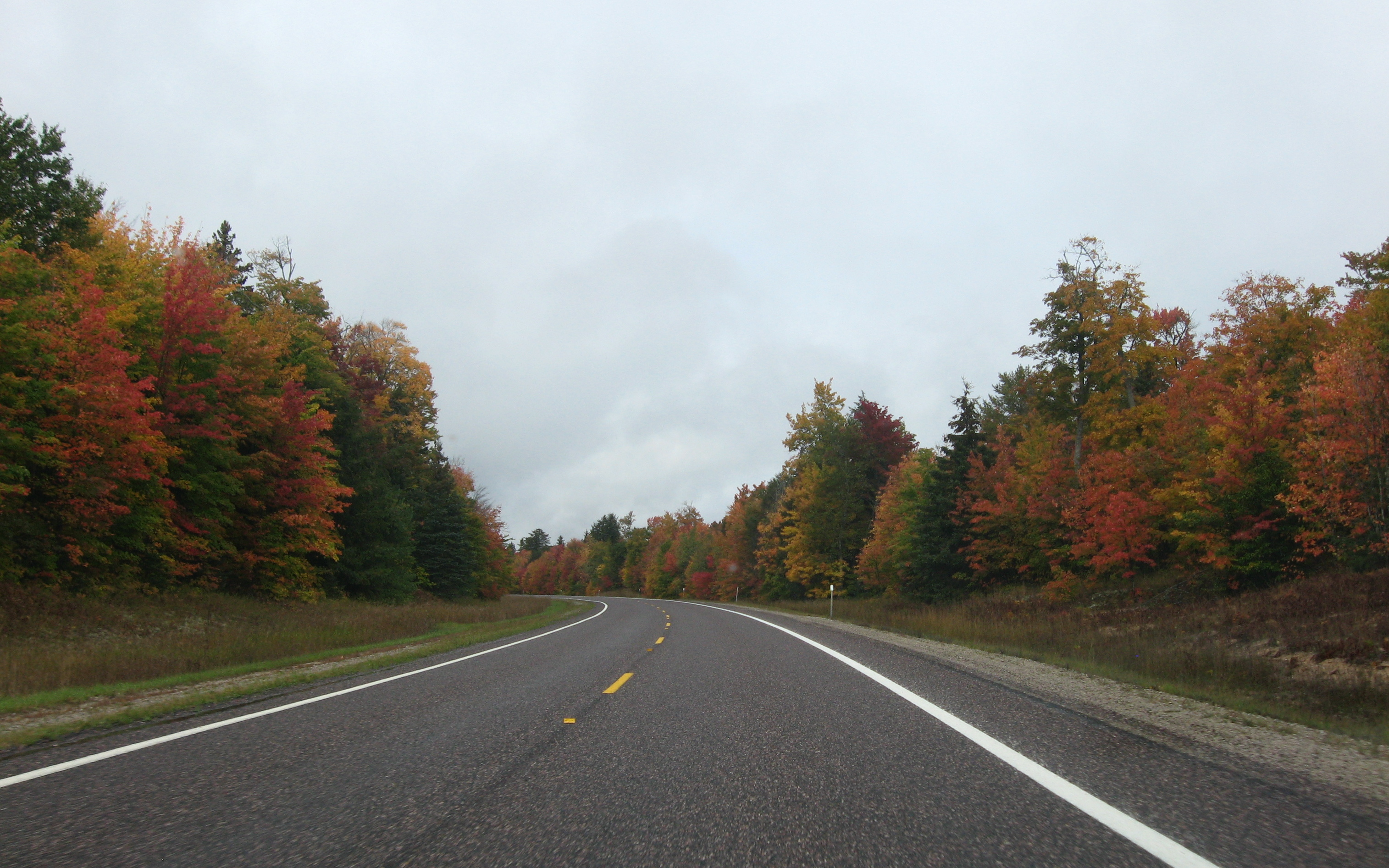
Heading north on M-77 midway between Seney and Grand Marais in autumn

Grand Marais is situated on the shores of Lake Superior some 25 miles (40 km) north of the mainline of the Lake Superior Circle Tour. Since the Tour runs only along state trunklines in Michigan, a Scenic Spur of the tour was created to route traffic north from Seney to Grand Marais. The scenic spur also terminates in Grand Marais with M-77 north of the junction with H-58.

M-77 is maintained by the Michigan Department of Transportation (MDOT) like other state highways in Michigan. As a part of these maintenance responsibilities, the department tracks the volume of traffic that uses the roadways under its jurisdiction. These volumes are expressed using a metric called annual average daily traffic, which is a statistical calculation of the average daily number of vehicles on a segment of roadway. MDOT's surveys in 2009 showed that the highest traffic levels along M-77 were the 1,924 vehicles daily between Floodwood and Ten Curves roads in Schoolcraft county; the lowest counts were the 799 vehicles per day north of M-28 in Seney. No section of M-77 has been listed on the National Highway System, a network of roads important to the country's economy, defense, and mobility.

== History ==
The route was first designated by July 1, 1919, with a route very close to its present course. A pair of sharp turns were straightened 11 miles (18 km) north of Seney at Lavender Corner around 1950. The last segments of gravel road were paved in 1958–59.

== Major intersections ==
| County | Location | mi | km | Destinations | Notes |
|---|---|---|---|---|---|
| Schoolcraft | Blaney Park | 0.000 | 0.000 | US 2 / LMCT – Manistique, St. Ignace | |
| Schoolcraft | Seney | 17.310 | 27.858 | M-28 west / LSCT west – Munising, Marquette | Western end of M-28 concurrency to cross the Fox River |
| Schoolcraft | Seney | 17.670 | 28.437 | M-28 east / LSCT east – Newberry, Sault Ste. Marie LSCT Spur north | Eastern end of M-28 concurrency; southern end of LSCT Scenic Spur concurrency |
| Alger | Grand Marais | 42.219 | 67.945 | H-58 east (Veteran Street) – Muskallonge Lake State Park | Southern end of H-58 concurrency |
| Alger | Grand Marais | 42.373 | 68.193 | H-58 west (Carlson Street) – Munising | Northern end of H-58 concurrency |
| Alger | Grand Marais | 42.602 | 68.561 | Braziel Street; Lake Avenue LSCT Spur south | Northern terminus of M-77 and LSCT Scenic Spur at Lake Avenue; roadway continues north as Lake Avenue |
1.000 mi = 1.609 km; 1.000 km = 0.621 mi: Concurrency terminus
