= McMillan Township, Luce County, Michigan =

McMillan Township, Michigan
- Civil township
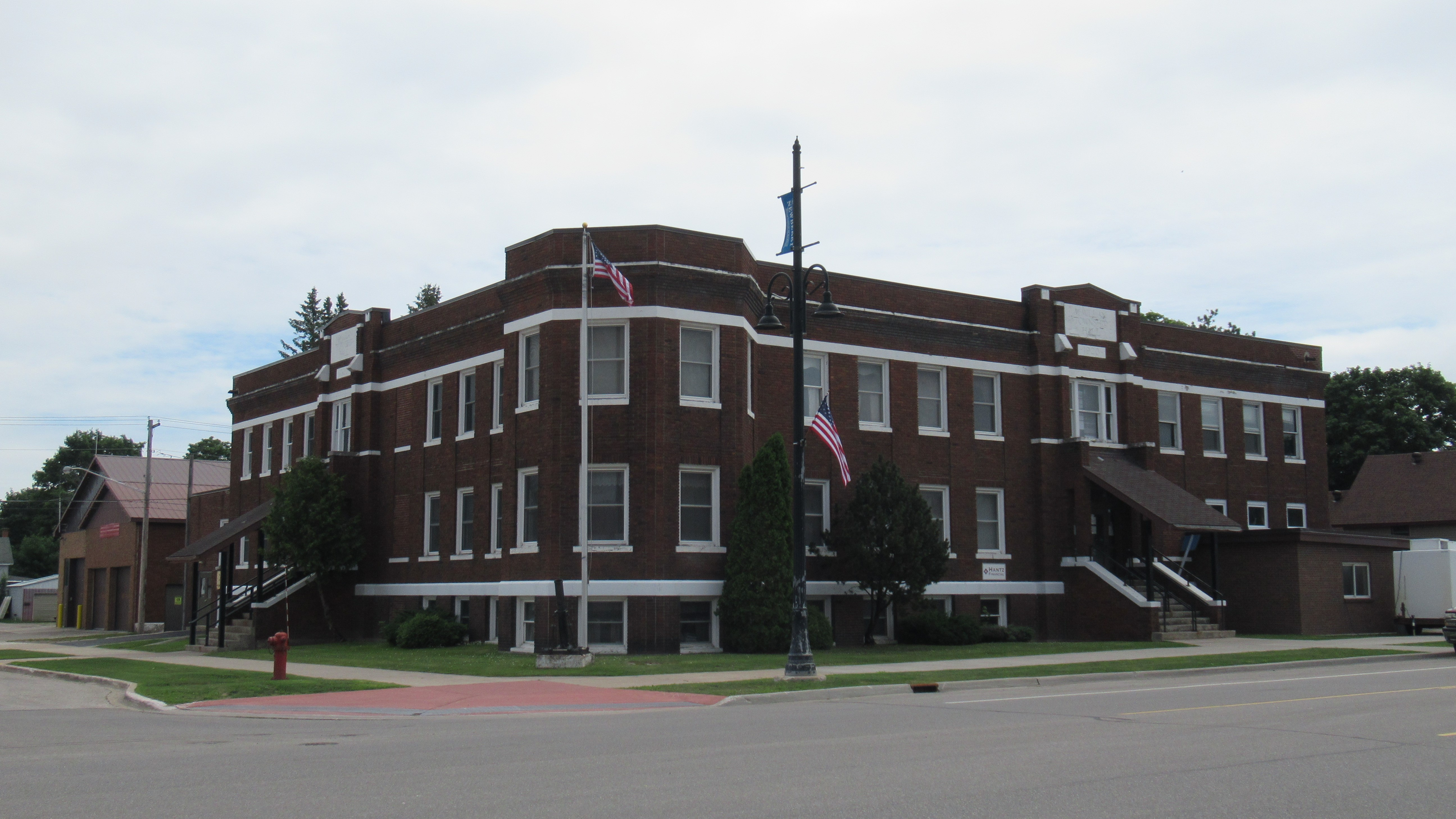
- McMillan Township Hall in Newberry

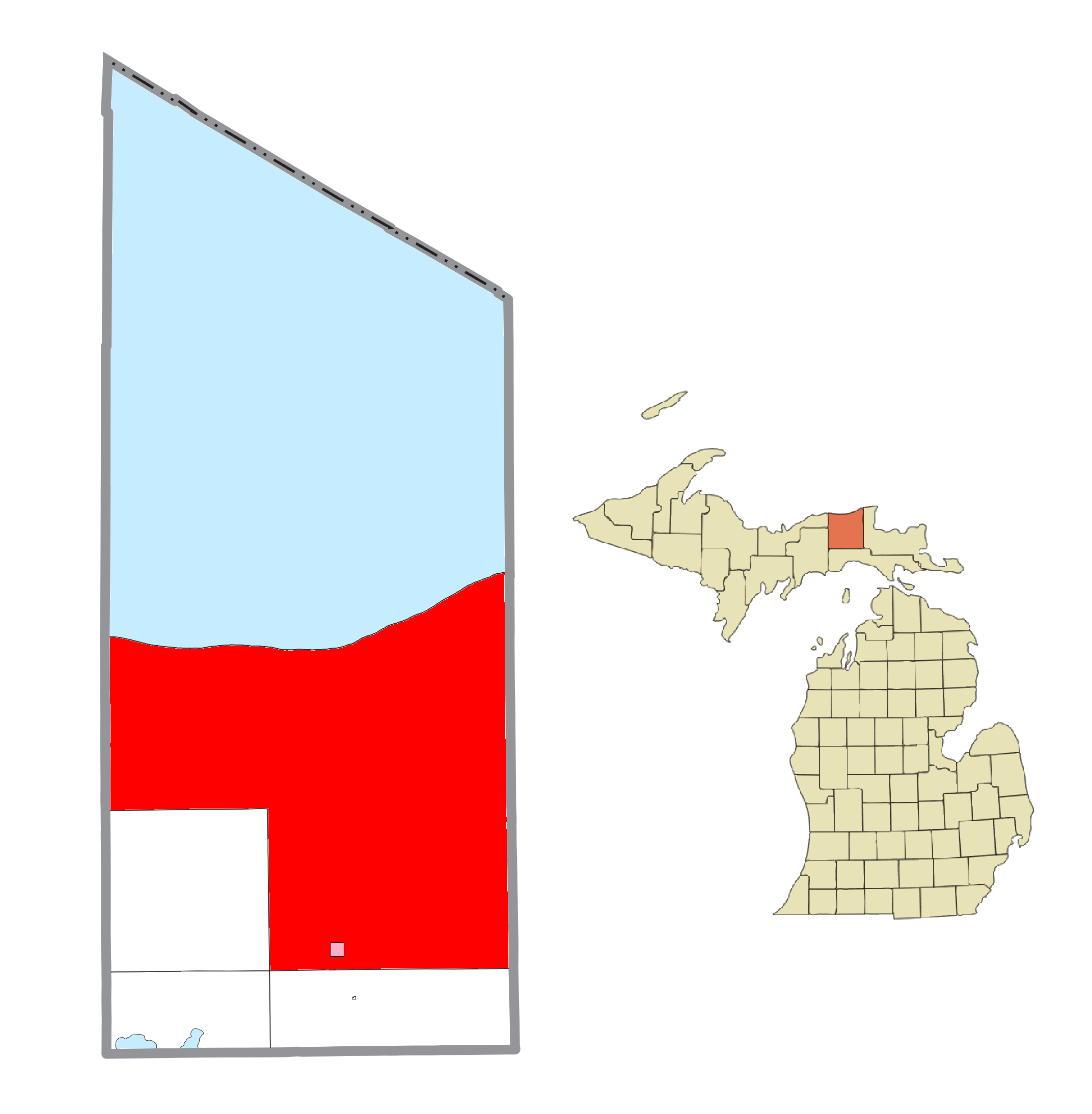
- Location within Luce County (red) and the administered village of Newberry (pink)

- Location within the state of Michigan Location within the United States
- Coordinates: 46°32′16″N 85°30′13″W
- Country: United States
- State: Michigan
- County: Luce
- Established: 1920

Government
  - Supervisor: Arthur Schultz
  - Clerk: Marie McNamara

Area
  - Total: 604.35 sq mi (1,565.26 km^{2})
  - Land: 588.78 sq mi (1,524.93 km^{2})
  - Water: 15.57 sq mi (40.33 km^{2})
- Elevation: 804 ft (245 m)

Population (2020)
  - Total: 2,471
  - Density: 4.2/sq mi (1.6/km^{2})
- Time zone: UTC-5 (Eastern (EST))
  - Summer (DST): UTC-4 (EDT)
- ZIP code(s): 49748 (Hulbert); 49768 (Paradise); 49868 (Newberry)
- Area code: 906
- FIPS code: 26-50440
- GNIS feature ID: 1626658
- Website: Official website

McMillan Township is a civil township of Luce County in the U.S. state of Michigan. The population was 2,471 at the 2020 census. At 588.78 square miles (1,524.9 km^{2}) of total land area, McMillan Township is the largest municipality by area in the state of Michigan.

McMillan Township occupies 65.5% of Luce County's land area and also contains the village of Newberry, which is the county seat and only incorporated municipality in the county. The township contains two state parks: Muskallonge Lake State Park and the western portion of Tahquamenon Falls State Park, which also includes the Upper Tahquamenon Falls. Crisp Point Light is also located in the northeast corner of the township.

== Geography ==
According to the U.S. Census Bureau, the township has a total area of 604.35 square miles (1,565.26 km^{2}), of which 588.78 square miles (1,524.93 km^{2}) is land and 15.57 square miles (40.33 km^{2}) (2.58%) is water.

The township has a long shoreline along Lake Superior and also includes numerous other lakes and rivers, such as Blind Sucker River, Carp River, Little Two Hearted River, Tahquamenon River, and Two Hearted River, as well as Muskallonge Lake.

The North Country Trail also passes through the township.

=== Major highways ===
- M-123 runs north–south through the south-central portion of the township.
- H-58, known locally as Deer Park Road, runs along the shores of Lake Superior and connects to Pictured Rocks.

=== Communities ===
- Betty B Landing is an unincorporated community located along the Tahquamenon River at 46°24′02″N 85°16′40″W. The landing is the northern terminus of a private railroad spur from Soo Junction, which now operates as the Toonerville Trolley Riverboat Tour offering tours on the 5.5 miles (8.9 km) 24-inch gauge railroad. The branch was built by the Duluth, South Shore and Atlantic Railroad from Soo Junction to the Hunter & Love Lumber Company mill on the Tahquamenon River in 1911. Built in standard gauge, the line was converted to narrow gauge to accommodate the mining engines used to pull the trolley tour's cars by Joseph Beech Sr., founder of the riverboat tours.
- Deer Park is an unincorporated community located at 46°40′28″N 85°36′59″W.
- Dollarville is an unincorporated community just west of Newberry at 46°21′05″N 85°32′31″W.
- Eightmile Corner is an unincorporated community located along H-37 in the western portion of the township at 46°25′08″N 85°35′38″W.
- Fourmile Corner is an unincorporated community located at the intersection of H-37 and M-123 at 46°25′09″N 85°30′38″W. It located about 4.0 miles (6.4 km) north of Newberry.
- Hunter's Mill is a former lumbering settlement located between Newberry and Soo Junction.
- Newberry is a village centered along M-123 at 46°21′08″N 85°30′38″W.
- Lencel is an unincorporated community located along the railway line just east of Newberry at 46°21′01″N 85°25′46″W.
- McPhees Landing is an unincorporated community located along the Tahquamenon River at 46°22′20″N 85°25′12″W.
- Natalie is an unincorporated community located along the railway line just west of Dollarville at 46°20′49″N 85°34′39″W.
- Pine Stump Junction is an unincorporated community located along Deer Park Road between Deer Park and Newberry at 46°34′09″N 85°35′29″W.
- Soo Junction is an unincorporated community located east of Newberry at 46°20′08″N 85°15′34″W. The community was named for its location along a railway junction of the South Shore and Atlantic Railroad and had its own post office from January 19, 1891, until May 30, 1941.

== Demographics ==
At the census of 2010, there were 2,692 people, 1,193 households, and 701 families residing in the township. The racial makeup of the township was 82.2% White, 0.3% African American, 6.2% Native American, 0.2% Asian, 0.03% Pacific Islander, 0.79% from other races, and 4.1% from two or more races. Hispanic or Latino of any race were 1.6% of the population. In 2020, its population was 2,471.

In 2010, there were 2,692 households, out of which 24.1% had children under the age of 18 living with them, 42.7% were married couples living together, 11.5% had a female householder with no husband present, and 41.2% were non-families. 55.1% of all households were made up of individuals, and 30.8% had someone living alone who was 65 years of age or older. The average household size was 2.20 and the average family size was 2.84.

== Gallery ==
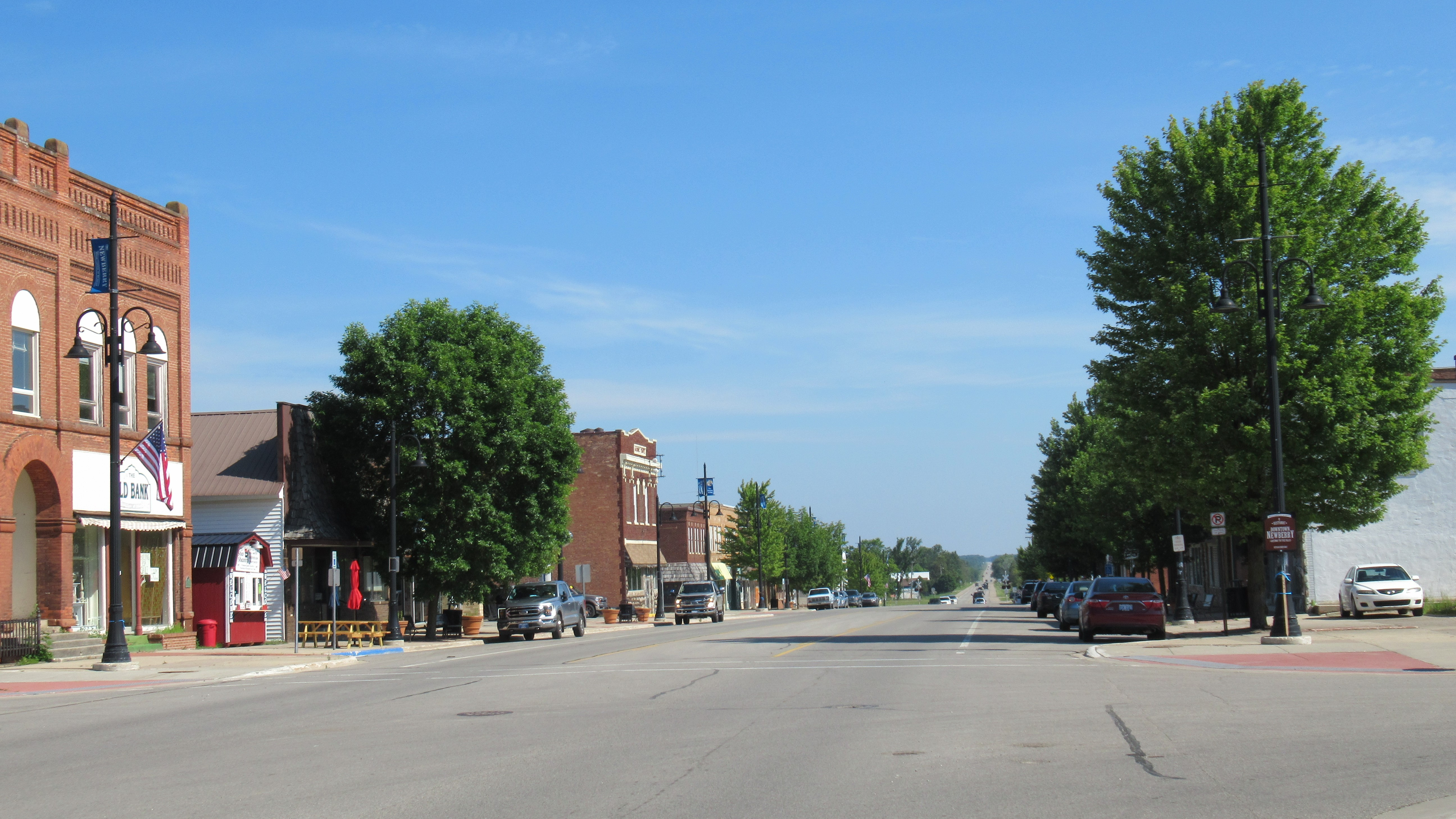
Village of Newberry along M-123

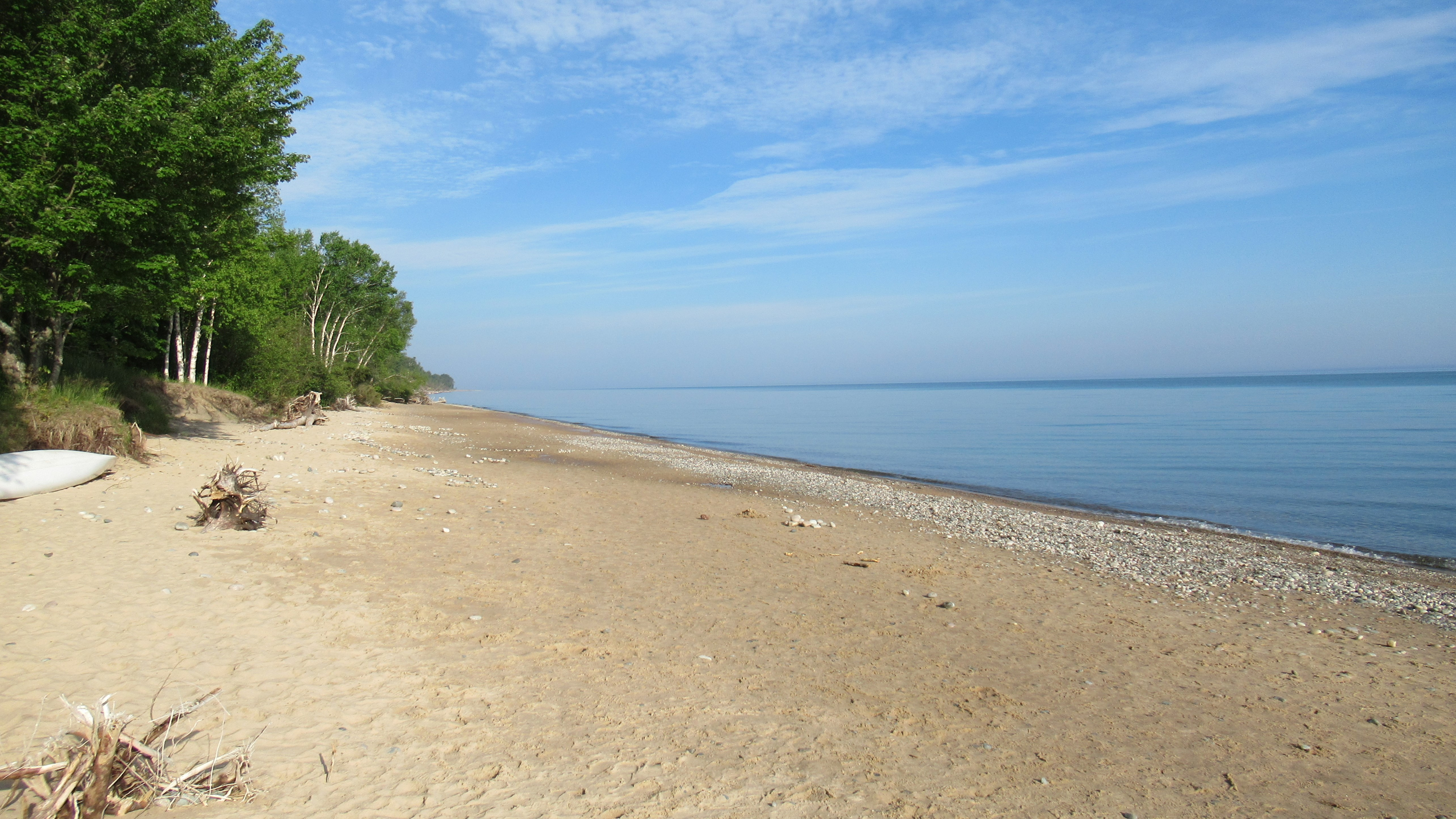
Muskallonge Lake State Park

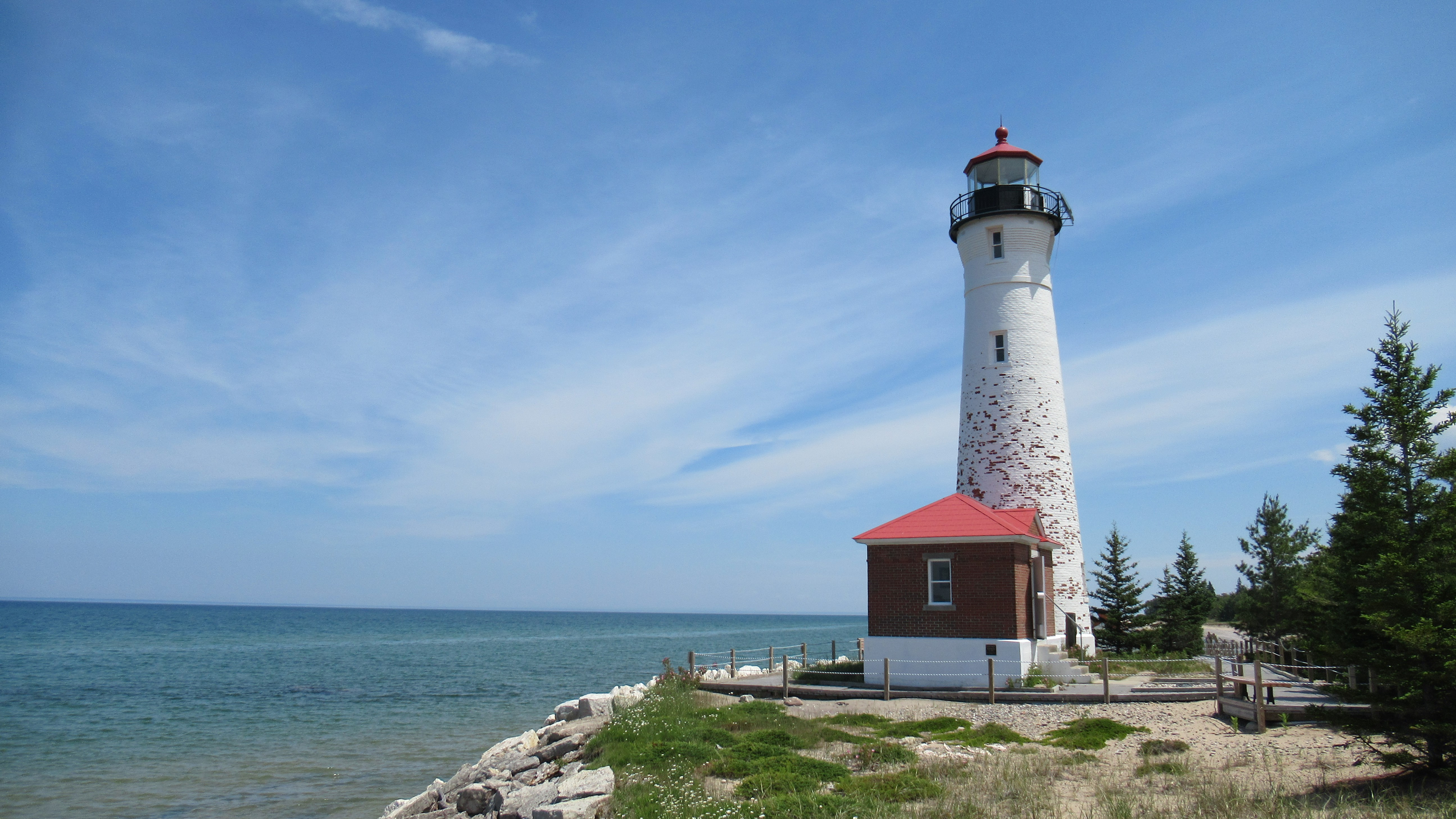
Crisp Point Light

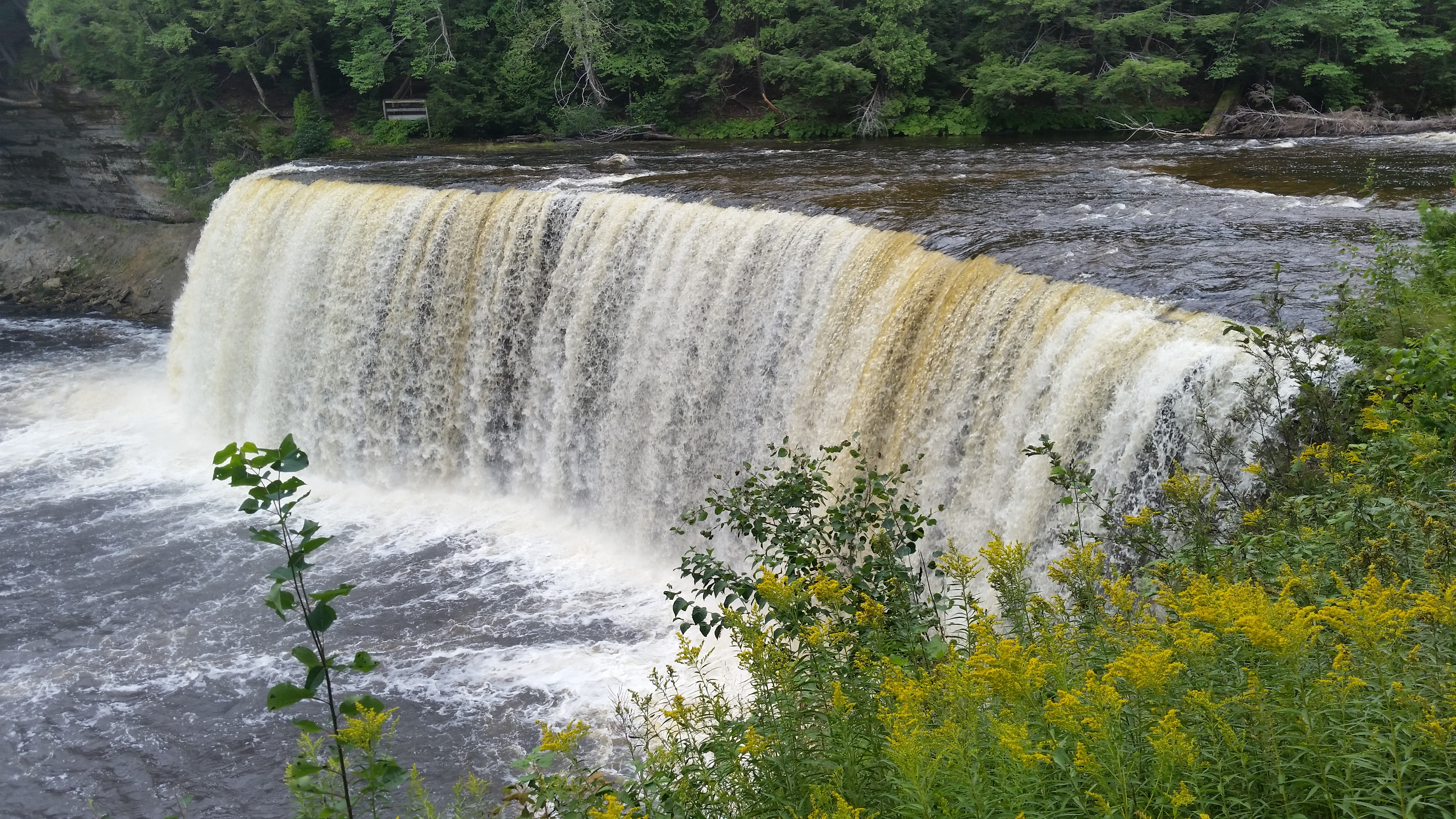
Upper Tahquamenon Falls
