= Muskallonge Lake =

Lake in Luce County, Michigan, United States

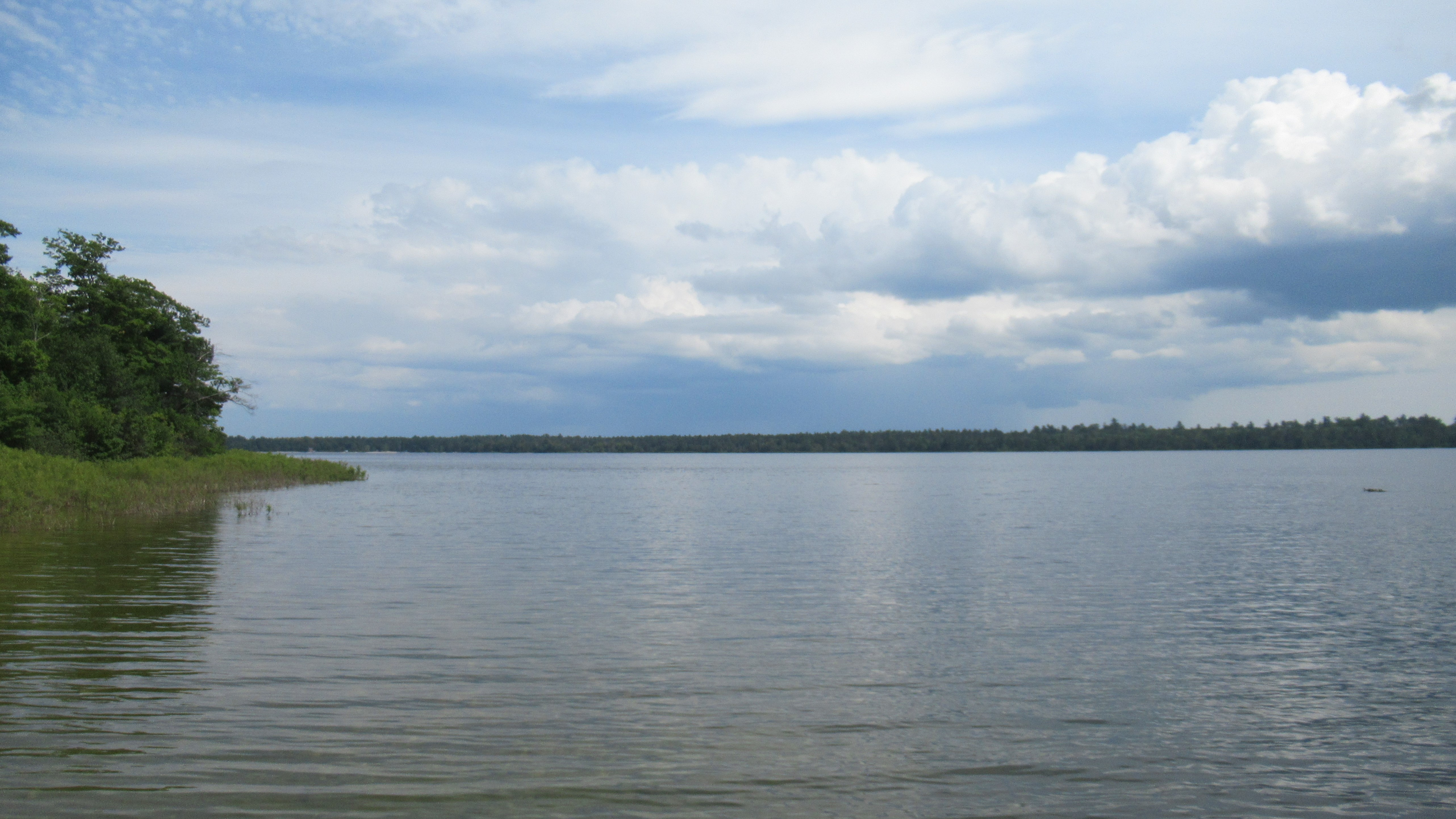
- View from Muskallonge Lake State Park

- Location within Michigan Location within the United States
- Location: McMillan Township; Luce County, Michigan
- Coordinates: 46°40′12″N 85°37′59″W
- Type: Lake
- Max. length: 1.9 mi (3.1 km)
- Max. width: 0.8 mi (1.3 km)
- Surface area: 780 acres (320 ha)
- Max. depth: 20 ft (6.1 m)
- Surface elevation: 630 ft (190 m)

Muskallonge Lake is a 780-acre (320 ha) lake in Luce County in the Upper Peninsula of the U.S. state of Michigan. Approximately 1.9 miles (3,100 m) long and .8 miles (1,300 m) wide, it is separated from Lake Superior to the north by a quarter-mile-wide strip of land that is the site of Muskallonge Lake State Park. Relatively shallow, the lake's deepest point is 20 feet (6.1 m) below the water surface. The lake sits at 630 feet (190 m) above sea level, thirty feet (9.1 m) above Lake Superior.

== Geology ==
Muskallonge Lake was created during the retreat of the Laurentide Ice Sheet, some 6,000 to 4,000 years ago. Since that time, it has been cut off from Lake Superior by a strip of land averaging one quarter of one mile wide. The surface sediments in the area of the lake consist of glacial drift made up clay, silt, sand, and gravel. The sand immediately surrounding and beneath Lake Muskallonge have been shown to be hydrophobic, a unique characteristic that contributes to Muskallonge Lake's maintaining a water level elevation significantly higher than the water level of Lake Superior despite the proximity of the much larger body of water.

== History ==
During the 19th century, the lake was used as a mill pond for white pine logs brought by narrow gauge railroad lines to feed the sawmill at the town of Deer Park. Remnants of its lumbering days are seen in partly submerged logs found in the lake.

== Fishing ==
Muskallonge Lake supports a variety of fish including northern pike, yellow perch, rock bass, walleye, and smallmouth bass. It is a popular destination for ice fishing.
