= Deer Park, Michigan =

- Unincorporated community
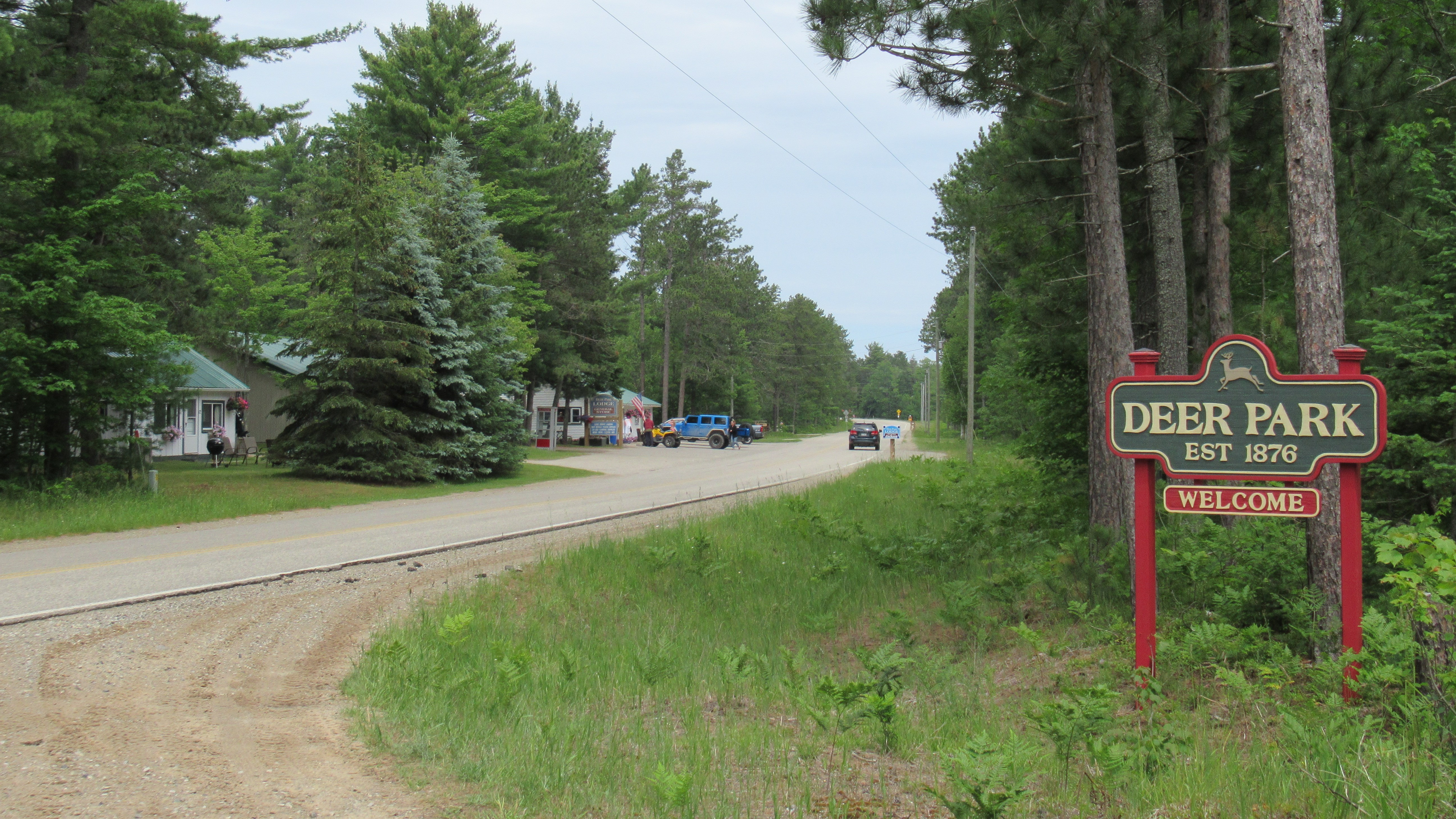
- Looking north along County Road 407

- Location within the state of Michigan Location within the United States
- Coordinates: 46°40′28″N 85°36′59″W
- Country: United States
- State: Michigan
- County: Luce
- Township: McMillan
- Established: 1876
- Elevation: 640 ft (200 m)
- Time zone: UTC-5 (Eastern (EST))
  - Summer (DST): UTC-4 (EDT)
- ZIP code(s): 49868 (Newberry)
- Area code: 906
- GNIS feature ID: 624494

Deer Park is an unincorporated community in Luce County in the U.S. state of Michigan. The community is located within McMillan Township. As an unincorporated community, Deer Park has no legally defined boundaries or population statistics of its own.

Settled as early as 1876, the community is centered along the eastern terminus of H-58 and County Road 407 along the shores of Lake Superior. Muskallonge Lake State Park is within the vicinity of Deer Park.

== History ==
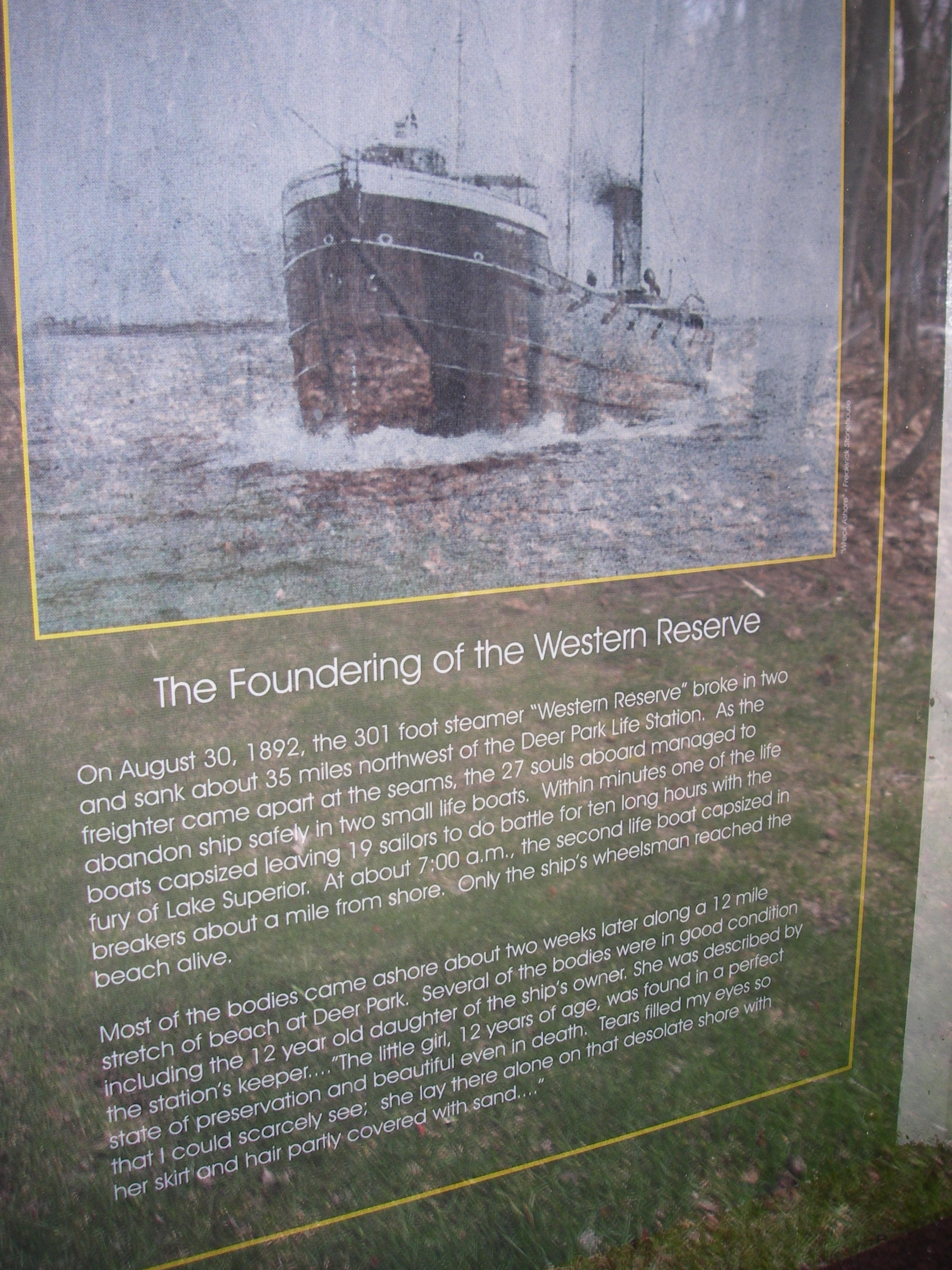
Commemoration of the Western Reserve on Muskallonge Lake State Park sign

Deer Park was originally settled as a Native American encampment. The community was later settled as a lumber-milling town. The Cook and Wilson Lumber Company purchased the first sawmill in the community in 1876. Deer Park expanded after Bradley and Hurst bought the mill ten years later. At the town's peak, it had a population of 400 people, making it one of the largest white pine logging communities. The mill produced 16,000 board feet every 24 hours. The Duluth, South Shore and Atlantic Railroad built a branch from Newberry to Deer Park to serve the mill, though the railroad was eventually removed. A post office opened July 12, 1888 with W.L.M. Powell was the first postmaster. The post office closed on January 15, 1900, due to the town's declining population. By the early 1900s, the lumber supply was gone from Deer Park, the sawmill closed, and Deer Park's population began to decline. The only remaining signs of the lumber industry are piles of sawdust and some pine logs in Muskallonge Lake, which was used to soften the logs before they were milled.

The shipping industry was also significant in Deer Park. The community was located on Lake Superior's Shipwreck Coast. The Deer Park (formerly Muskallonge Lake) Station was the site of one of six Lake Superior stations of the Lifesaving Service between Munising, Michigan and Vermilion Point. In 1892, the SS Western Reserve sank about 35 miles northwest of Deer Park with the loss of all but the wheelsman. In 1907, the SS Cyprus sank north of Deer Park; all but one of its crew members died.

=== Present-day community ===
Since the 21st century, it has remained an unincorporated community, also containing a lodge and a general store, which primarily cater to visitors to the state park. Deer Park is the terminus of County Highways H-37 (aka: CR 407) and H-58.
