= List of lifesaving stations in Michigan =

This is a list of United States Lifesaving Stations in Michigan.

- Beaver Island Harbor Light
- Big Sable Point Light
- Bois Blanc Light
- Charlevoix Life Saving Station
- Crisp Point Light
- Deer Park Lifesaving Station
- Eagle Harbor Lifesaving Station
- Frankfort Lifesaving Station
- Grand Haven Lifesaving Station
- Holland Lifesaving Station
- Grand Marais Light
- Grindstone City Lifesaving Station
- Hammond Bay Lifeboat Station
- Harbor Beach Light
- Ludington Lifesaving Station
- Mackinac Island Lifesaving Station
- Marquette Lifesaving Station
- Middle Island Lifesaving Station
- Muskegon Lifesaving Station
- Pentwater Lifesaving Station
- Pointe aux Barques Light
- Point Betsie Light
- Port Lake Ship Canal Lifesaving Station
- North Manitou Island Lifesaving Station
- Saint Joseph Lifesaving Station
- Sleeping Bear Point Life Saving Station
- South Haven Lifesaving Station
- South Manitou Island
- Station Lake View Beach
- Sturgeon Point Light
- Tawas Point Light
- Thunder Bay Island Lifesaving Station
- Two Heart Lifesaving Station
- Vermilion Point
