= Munising Township, Michigan =

- Civil township
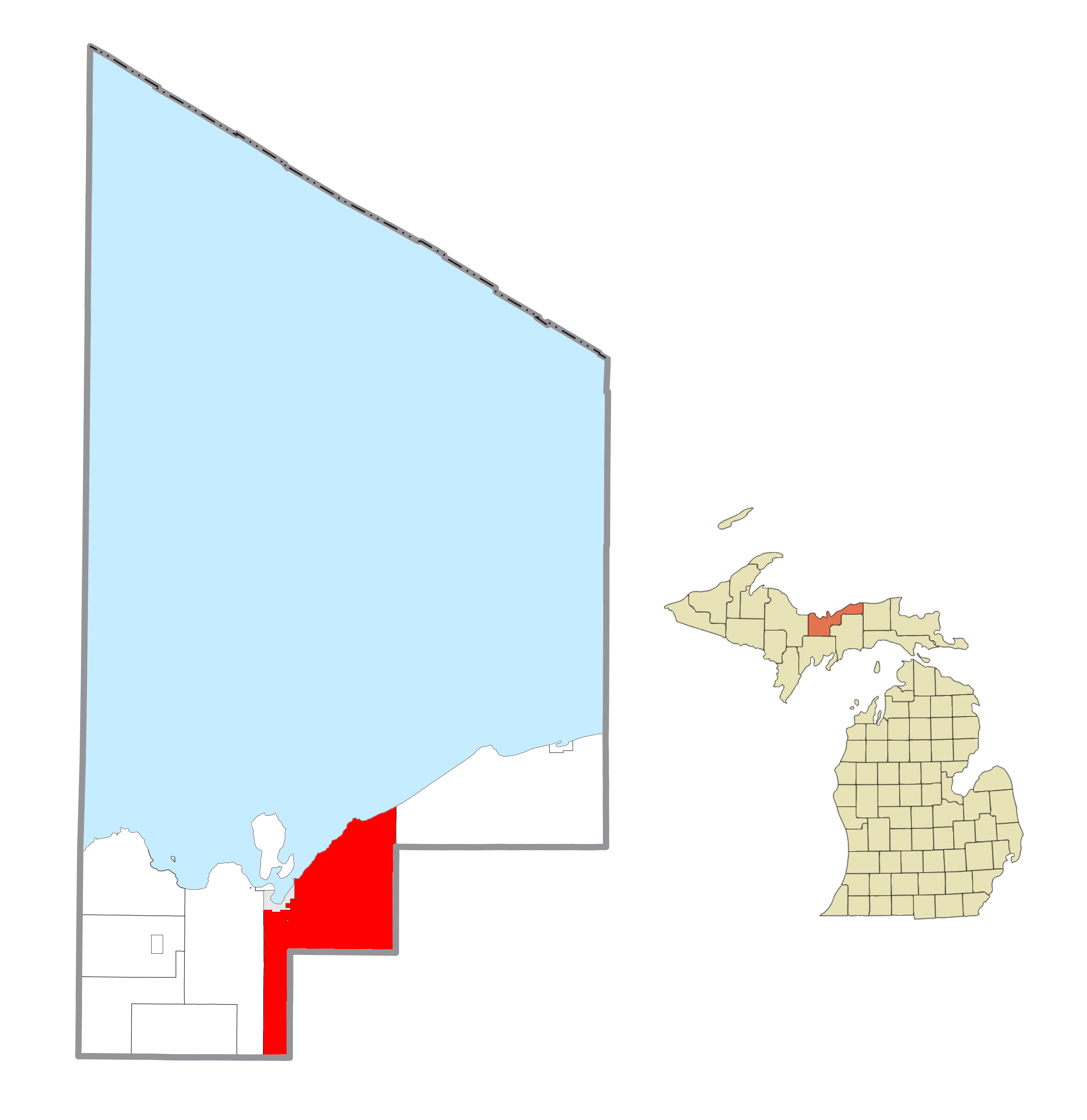
- Location within Alger County

- Location within the state of Michigan Location within the United States
- Coordinates: 46°20′16″N 86°34′17″W
- Country: United States
- State: Michigan
- County: Alger
- Established: 1867

Government
  - Supervisor: Lisa Howard
  - Clerk: Patty Willson

Area
  - Total: 217.7 sq mi (563.8 km^{2})
  - Land: 202.2 sq mi (523.7 km^{2})
  - Water: 15.5 sq mi (40.1 km^{2})
- Elevation: 850 ft (259 m)

Population (2020)
  - Total: 2,865
  - Density: 14.8/sq mi (5.7/km^{2})
- Time zone: UTC-5 (Eastern (EST))
  - Summer (DST): UTC-4 (EDT)
- ZIP code(s): 49862 (Munising); 49884 (Shingleton); 49895 (Wetmore)
- Area code: 906
- FIPS code: 26-56220
- GNIS feature ID: 1626781
- Website: Official website

Munising Township is a civil township of Alger County in the U.S. state of Michigan. As of 2020, its population was 2,865.

== Geography ==
According to the United States Census Bureau, the township has a total area of 217.7 square miles (563.8 km^{2}), of which 202.2 square miles (523.7 km^{2}) is land and 15.5 square miles (40.1 km^{2}), or 7.11%, is water.

=== Communities ===
The city of Munising is adjacent to the northwest corner of the township, but is an autonomous municipality. There are several historic locales and unincorporated communities in the township:

- Camp Cusino, a minimum security state prison, has a Shingleton address one-mile (1.6 km) west of Shingleton.
- Doty is a locale at the junction of the former Marquette and Eastern Railway (now the Lake Superior and Ishpeming Railroad) and the Duluth, South Shore and Atlantic Railway (now the Soo Line Railroad) at 46°21′46″N 86°32′07″W. It was named after Marcus A. Doty, a manager for the Marquette & Eastern. The station is called Evelyn on the Soo Line.
- Gogarnville was the name of a post office here from 1889 until 1893.
- Hallston was a former post office and a station on the Duluth, South Shore and Atlantic Railway 46°23′00″N 86°40′36″W ; Elevation: 712 ft (217 m). The post office was established as "Anna River" on October 12, 1888, with Neil Steinburg as its first postmaster. The office was transferred and renamed Hallston on December 19, 1888, with railroad agent Julius W. Gogarn as its first postmaster. The office operated until August 14, 1897. From 1895 to 1897, the Hallston Post Office operated as a summer post office.
- Indian Town is located at Old Indian Town and Indian Town Road (46°24′32″N 86°33′47″W Elevation: 883 ft (269 m).
- Juniper is a place at Coalwood Recreation Trail and County Road 646 (46°21′29″N 86°35′25″W Elevation: 925 ft (282 m).
- Kentucky is a place on Doe Lake Road west of Kentucky Trail (46°21′29″N 86°35′25″W Elevation: 856 ft (261 m).
- Melstrand is an unincorporated community at the junction of county highways H-58 and H-52 (Cusino Trail) (46°27′47″N 86°24′55″W Elevation: 928 ft (283 m), about eleven miles (18 km) east of Munising on county road H-58. It was a sawmill village with a railway station and a post office that operated from July 11, 1917, until February 15, 1926.
- Myren is a place at 46°25′34″N 86°25′38″W (Elevation: 886 ft (270 m).
- Petrel was a former post office and station on the Duluth, South Shore and Atlantic Railway at 46°21′10″N 86°23′10″W, formed as a lumber settlement around the C. H. Worcester Company operations. A post office was established on September 2, 1903, although the first appointed postmaster, E. V. McGregor, declined the position. Marcel A. Nadeau was appointed on November 2, 1903. The office was discontinued on June 29, 1907.
- Reedsboro was a former post office and a station on the Detroit, Mackinac and Marquette Railroad in 1884 at M-28 and Percy Road (46°20′53″N 86°29′25″W Elevation: 837 ft (255 m). A post office operated from March 29, 1886, until February 16, 1887.
- Shingleton is an unincorporated community at 46°20′54″N 86°28′13″W, about ten miles (16 km) southeast of Munising, at the eastern junction of M-28 and M-94. West of Shingleton, M-28 and M-94 run concurrently until about a mile south of Munising. The Michigan Department of Natural Resources operates the Cusino Wildlife Research Station & Field Office in Shingleton. The ZIP Code is 49884. Shingleton was a station on the Detroit, Mackinac and Marquette Railroad named "Jeromeville" in 1882, after David H. Jerome, then the governor of Michigan (1881–1883). A post office was established in 1887 named Shingleton, after the local shingle mill.
- Star, or Star Siding, is an unincorporated community on M28, west of Star Siding Road (46°20′34″N 86°53′11″W Elevation: 804 ft (245 m).
- Van Meer is a place at 46°25′10″N 86°28′11″W.
- Wetmore is an unincorporated community at 46°22′47″N 86°37′13″W, about two miles (3.2 km) southeast of Munising, on M-28/M-94. The ZIP Code is 49895. Wetmore began as a mostly Indian settlement called "Floeter", and had a post office with that name from 1883 to 1889 (with short interruptions). In October 1889, it was renamed "Munising" (the present city of Munising was known as "Old Munising" at the time). It was a station on the Duluth, South Shore and Atlantic Railway. William L. Wetmore arrived circa 1871 and built up a business making hardwood charcoal and a general store. The town and post office were renamed for him in 1895.

== Demographics ==
Historical population
Census	Pop.	Note	%±
1960	1,408		—
1970	1,614		14.6%
1980	1,963		21.6%
1990	2,193		11.7%
2000	3,125		42.5%
2010	2,983		−4.5%
Source: Census Bureau. Census 1960- 2000, 2010.

In 2000, there were 3,125 people, 828 households, and 669 families residing in the township. The population density was 15.4 per square mile (6.0/km^{2}). There were 1,154 housing units at an average density of 5.7 per square mile (2.2/km^{2}). The racial makeup of the township was 73.02% White, 18.98% African American, 4.29% Native American, 0.32% Asian, 0.03% Pacific Islander, 0.86% from other races, and 2.50% from two or more races. Hispanic or Latinos of any race were 1.54% of the population. Culturally, 8.4% were of American, 8.4% French, 8.0% German, 7.0% Finnish, 6.4% Polish, 6.2% Irish, 6.0% French Canadian and 5.8% English ancestry. By the 2020 census, its population declined to 2,865 with a predominantly non-Hispanic white population.

In 2000, there were 828 households, out of which 37.1% had children under the age of 18 living with them, 70.0% were married couples living together, 6.4% had a female householder with no husband present, and 19.2% were non-families. 14.5% of all households were made up of individuals, and 5.8% had someone living alone who was 65 years of age or older. The average household size was 2.74 and the average family size was 3.02.

In the township the population was spread out, with 20.1% under the age of 18, 9.8% from 18 to 24, 39.5% from 25 to 44, 21.8% from 45 to 64, and 8.9% who were 65 years of age or older. The median age was 35 years. For every 100 females, there were 179.0 males. For every 100 females age 18 and over, there were 206.9 males.

At the 2000 census, the median income for a household in the township was $40,946, and the median income for a family was $45,114. Males had a median income of $38,649 versus $24,167 for females. The per capita income for the township was $17,448. About 5.4% of families and 7.8% of the population were below the poverty line, including 9.8% of those under age 18 and 6.9% of those age 65 or over. As of 2021 census estimates, its median household income was $48,203.
