= Crisp Point Light =

Lighthouse in Michigan, United States

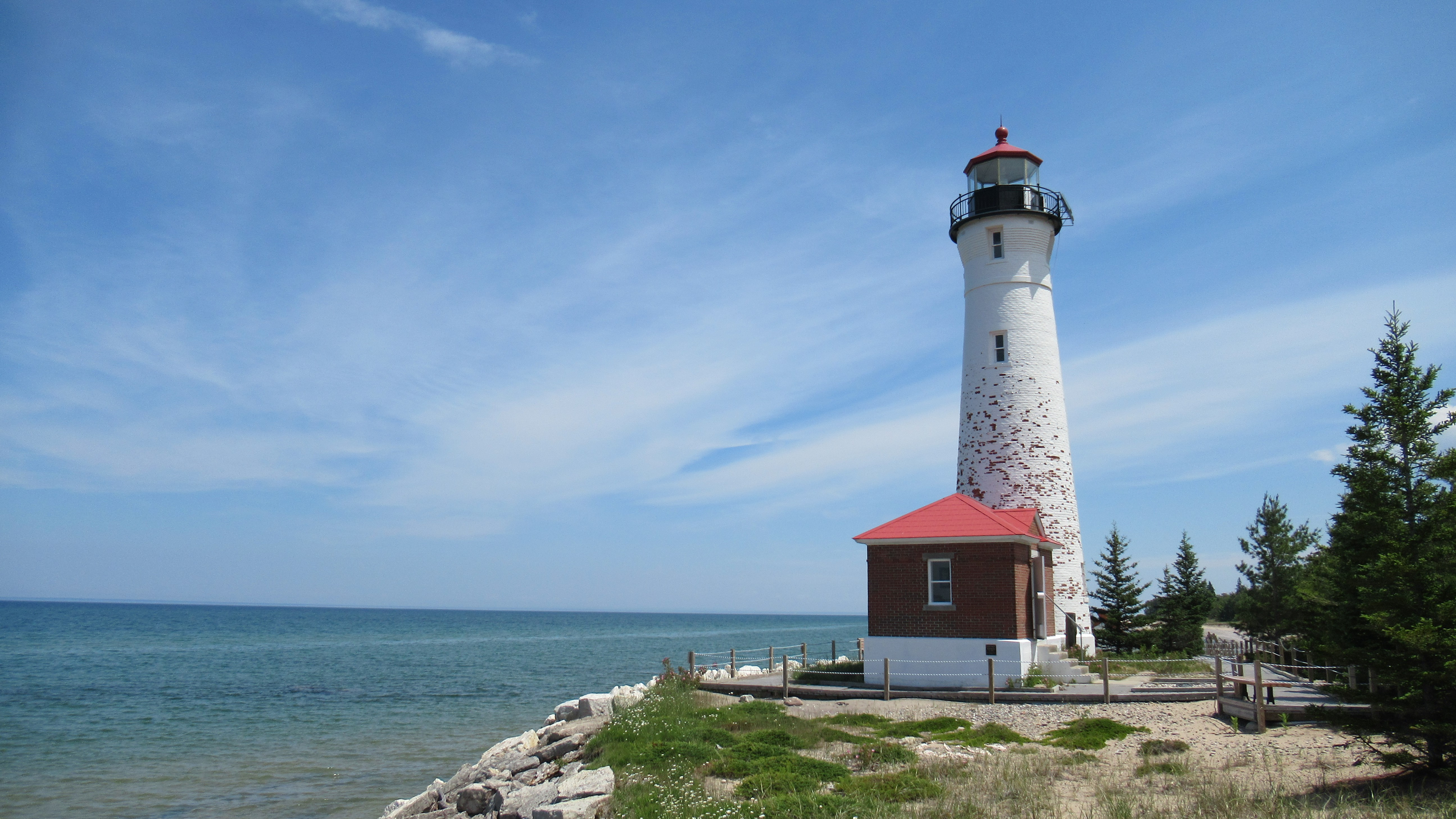
- Crisp Point Light in June 2021
- Location: Lake Superior shoreline McMillan Township, Michigan
- Coordinates: 46°45.173′N 85°15.440′W

Tower
- Foundation: poured concrete
- Construction: brick
- Height: 58 feet (18 m)
- Shape: conical
- Markings: White W/Black Lantern

Light
- First lit: 1904
- Deactivated: 1992-2013
- Focal height: 62 feet (19 m)
- Lens: Fourth Order Fresnel lens
- Range: 13 nautical miles; 24 kilometres (15 mi)
- Characteristic: Fl W 6s

Crisp Point was one of five U.S. Life-Saving Service Stations along the coast of Lake Superior between Munising and Whitefish Point in the Upper Peninsula of Michigan. The lighthouse is within McMillan Township in Luce County.

Located about 14 miles (23 km) west of Whitefish Point, in 1876 it became Life Saving Station Number Ten, of the U.S. Life-Saving Service District 10 (later part of District 11). Crisp Point is named from one of the Life Saving Station keepers, Christopher Crisp, who is said to have been "an iron-willed boatman." Surfmen were stationed there to aid mariners and ships in distress. The station, along with the rest of the United States Life-Saving Service, was integrated into the United States Coast Guard in 1915. (In 1939 the U.S. Lighthouse Service also merged under the control of the Coast Guard). Because the US Life-Saving Service and the US Lighthouse Service were originally two distinct entities, the Crisp Point Life Saving Station and the Crisp Point Lighthouse were also originally two separate entities.

The other four Life-Saving Stations were Vermilion Point (now Vermilion, Michigan), about five miles (8 km) east of Crisp Point, Two Hearted River, 5 or 6 miles (8.0 or 9.7 km) west of Crisp Point, Deer Park, Michigan (formerly known as the Sucker River Station and Muskallonge Lake Station), about 10 or 11 miles (16 or 18 km) west of Two Hearted River, and Grand Marais about 15 or 16 miles (24 or 26 km) west of Deer Park.

== History ==
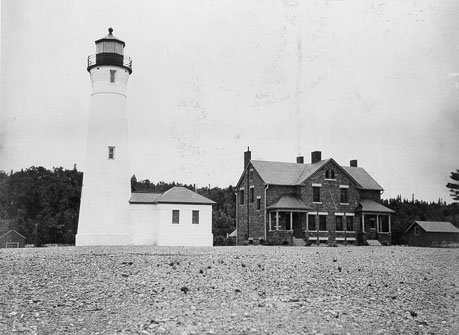
Undated historic photo of the lighthouse with the former keepers dwelling

Crisp Point Lighthouse was first proposed in 1896 and every year thereafter until finally approved in June, 1902. Construction began one year later. The 15 acres (6.1 ha) of land was purchased at a price of $30.00. The deed was dated May 21, 1903. In the 58-foot (18 m) high tower a fourth order red Fresnel lens by Sautter and Lemonnier of Paris, France was installed. The light was displayed for the first time in May 1904.

The lighthouse tower is 58 feet from base to the lantern's ventilator ball top.

This lighthouse and life saving station have undergone massive damage. All were destroyed by erosion, except for the tower and one wall of the entrance room. In the winter of 1997/98, the loss was stayed by the installation of one thousand cubic yards of stone in front of the tower. The stone came from a quarry in Newberry and the cost was approximately $42,000. More stone was installed along the shore in 2003, 2006, 2007, 2010, 2016 (about 141 tons), and 2017 (about 295 tons). There are further plans for protection and stabilization as funds become available.

The stretch of coast between Whitefish Point and Grand Island became known as "The Shipwreck Coast." On November 10, 1975, the SS Edmund Fitzgerald sank during a violent storm. It sank in Lake Superior about 17 miles (27 km) northeast of Crisp Point. The Fitzgerald's last radio communication was with the Coast Guard station at Grand Marais. In fact, some tourists go to the five life saving stations in an organized manner for a day trip.

On December 1, 1908 the 468-foot steel freighter D. M. Clemson (built in 1903) disappeared without a trace somewhere between Crisp Point and Grand Marais.

Nearby, in the Great Lakes Storm of 1913 the freighter Major (built in 1889) was stranded near the point; and the 1902 William Nottingham lost three men in the area, after they agreed to fetch assistance in a lifeboat, which overturned as they embarked. See, Shipwrecks of the 1913 Great Lakes storm and List of victims of the 1913 Great Lakes storm.

This light was almost completely lost due to the elements and neglect. Also demolished were the original white frame boathouse, barn, brick oil house and two outbuildings. In 1993 the lighthouse was decommissioned by the US Coast Guard. In 1997-98, one thousand cubic yards of stone were placed in front of the tower to stabilize and protect it.

Ownership of Crisp Point Light was transferred from the Coast Guard to Luce County in February, 1997 under the National Historic Preservation Act of 1966, which is the predecessor to the National Historic Lighthouse Preservation Act of 2000. The Crisp Point Lighthouse was then leased to the Crisp Point Light Historical Society. In 2012, the CPLHS applied for a Private Aids to Navigation (PATON) permit to operate a Class II light from May 1 to November 1 each year, which was approved by the USCG on July 25, 2012. A 300mm LED marine light was installed in the tower on November 23, 2012. On May 4, 2013, the light was reactivated and has been operated seasonally ever since.

== Present ==
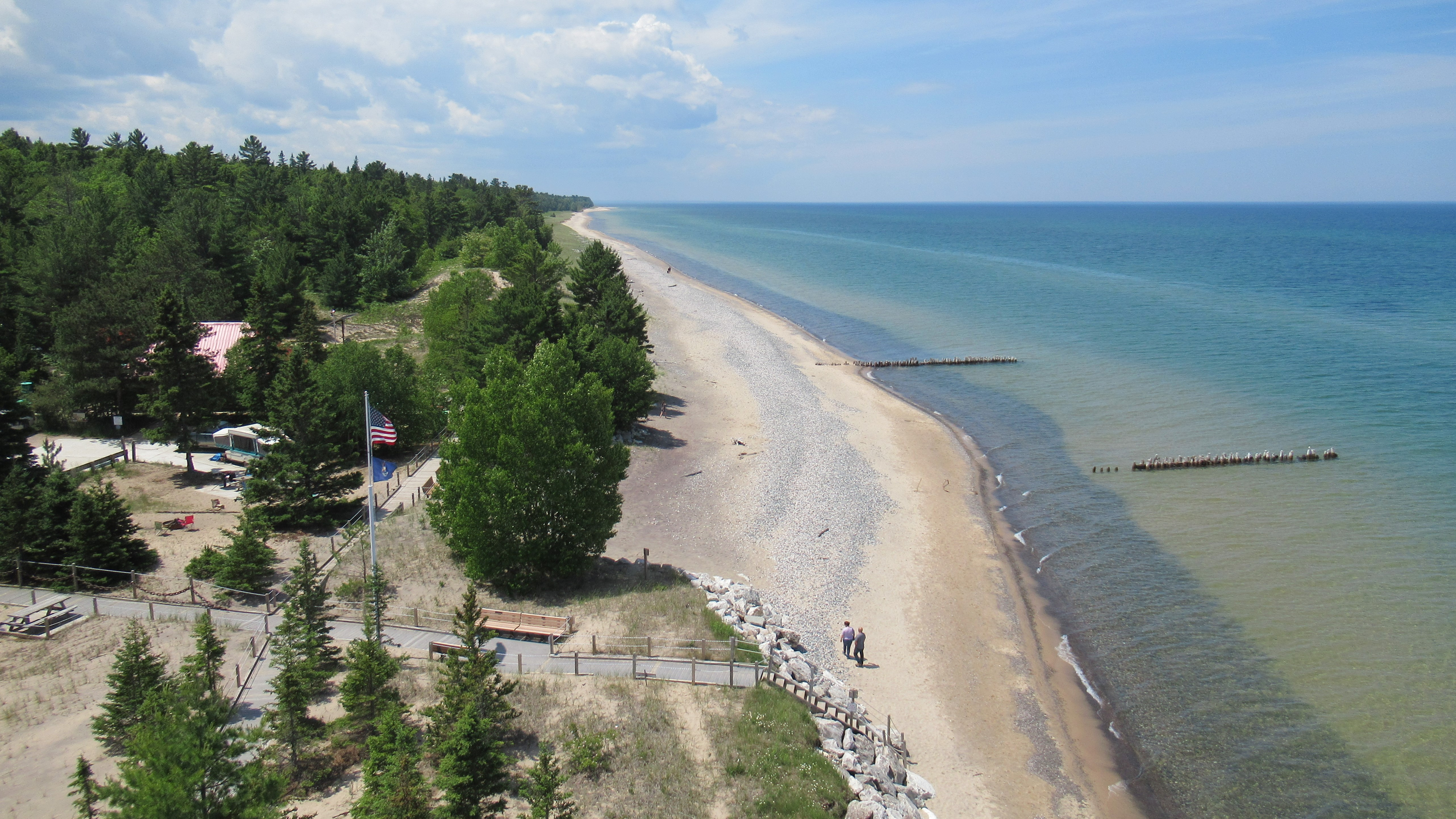
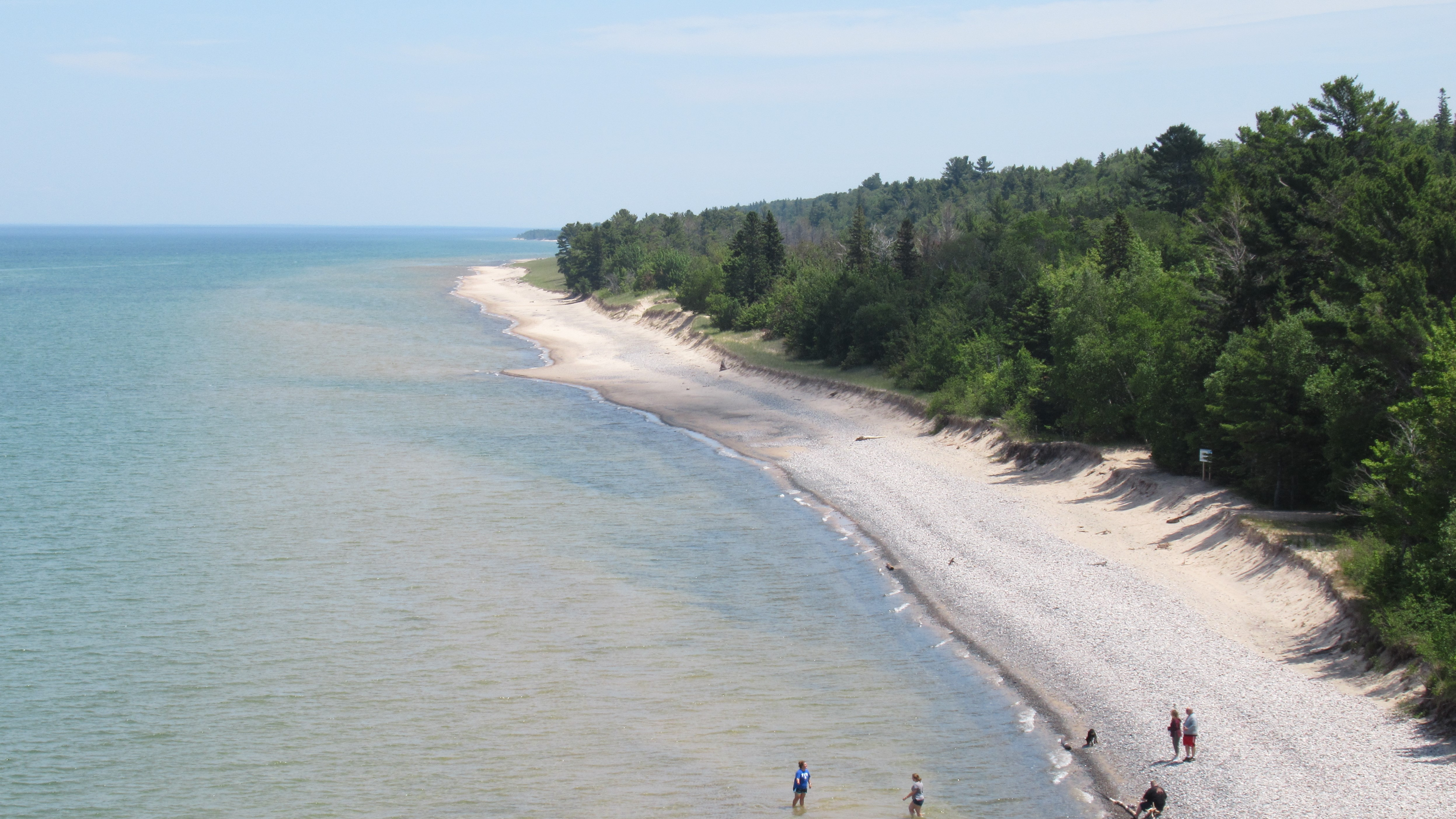
View from the lighthouse tower deck looking west (top) and east (bottom)

The Crisp Point Light is now a center for renovation and renewal. Under the direction of the Crisp Point Light Historical Society, and other cooperating organizations, there are recurring events at the site. Once on the "Doomsday List", the lighthouse has been returned to pristine condition. The service building that was destroyed in 1996 has been rebuilt. A visitor center has been built next to the parking lot. The visitor center contains bathrooms, a very small shop, and a little museum. A fourth order Fresnel lens has been loaned to the society for display. In the summer of 2016, a major brick restoration on the exterior of the tower was completed. All of the paint was stripped from the tower and after the brick work was completed it was repainted white. This work was completed through funds raised by the CPLHS and with a grant of $25,000 from the Michigan Lighthouse Assistance Program, which is administered by Michigan's State Historic Preservation Office. In addition, more stone was placed in front of the boardwalk on the east side of the lighthouse at a cost of approximately $25,000 to help protect the shoreline and boardwalk from further erosion. The CPLHS completed some interior renovations of the tower in 2017 and plans to install more erosion control stone in July 2020.

== See also ==
- Graveyard of the Great Lakes
- Lighthouses in the United States
- List of lifesaving stations in Michigan
- Shipwrecks of the 1913 Great Lakes storm
