= Vermilion Point =

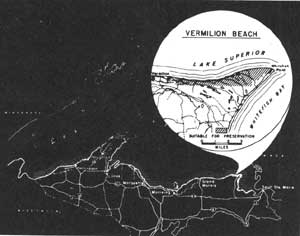
- Location: Whitefish Township, Chippewa County, Michigan, USA
- Coords: 46°45′47″N 85°08′56″W
- Organization: Little Traverse Nature Conservancy
- Historic use: Vermilion Lifesaving Station 1877 - 1944
- Modern use: Vermilion Point Nature Conservancy
- Website: www.landtrust.org

Vermilion Point is a remote, undeveloped shore in Chippewa County, Michigan, United States. Located 9.75 miles (15.69 km) west of Whitefish Point, Michigan, this historic spot lies on a stretch of Lake Superior’s southeast coast known as the "Graveyard of the Great Lakes" or the "Shipwreck Coast". The servicemen of Vermilion Lifesaving Station performed daring rescues of shipwrecks from 1877 until 1944 when it was closed after modern navigational technology made this service obsolete.

Vermilion Point was a popular stopover for Native Americans, early travelers, and explorers. Early settlers used its bogs and marshes to grow cranberries that were shipped to Chicago, Illinois, and Duluth, Minnesota. Today it is protected as a nature preserve for study of avian ecology and research of the piping plover and beach plant community succession.

== Ecology ==
Its sand and pebble beach is intermingled with agates that are churned ashore during storms. Pounding surf and buffeting winds keep the low barrier dune paralleling the beach sparsely vegetated. Water filled Swales, bogs, and marshes occupy the land behind the barrier dune.

Vermilion Point no longer exists as a peninsula. Sand Creek flowing out of the surrounding wetlands into Lake Superior is the only remaining geographical landmark for Vermilion The original forest cover was lumbered off and is now replaced with typical northern hardwoods and conifers.

== Shiras Expeditions ==
In the early 20th century the University of Michigan conducted, over several years, a comprehensive series of ecological investigations in the Whitefish Point-Vermillion region, supported by George Shiras. Subjects included botany; ichthyology; ornithology; herpetology; and others, and provide nearly 100 years later a valuable set of baseline data for conditions at the time. The report of the flora, for example, includes in addition to a list of plants found and their habitats and locations, many photographs of the area around the Vermillion Station and the nearby wetlands. Many of the results were published under the general title "Results of the Shiras Expeditions to the Whitefish Point Region, Michigan", most by the University of Michigan (Occasional Papers series of several of the museums), the Reports of the Michigan Academy of Science, or the Michigan Geological and Biological Survey.

== Early history ==
Vermilion was named for the nearby vermilion deposits used by the Native Americans for paint. There is no evidence that Native Americans permanently settled at Vermilion but it was a popular stopover for Native Americans, Voyageurs, Coureur des bois, trappers, and anyone who traveled the south shore of Lake Superior. Jesuit missionaries were probably the first Europeans to stop at Vermilion in the 17th century. Territorial governor Lewis Cass and geologist and Indian Agent Henry Schoolcraft passed through Vermilion Point with a party of 44 in 1820 on an official expedition along the south shore of Lake Superior. Henry Schoolcraft took overnight shelter from a storm at Vermilion in 1831 when leading a party to vaccinate Native Americans.

== Life Saving Service ==
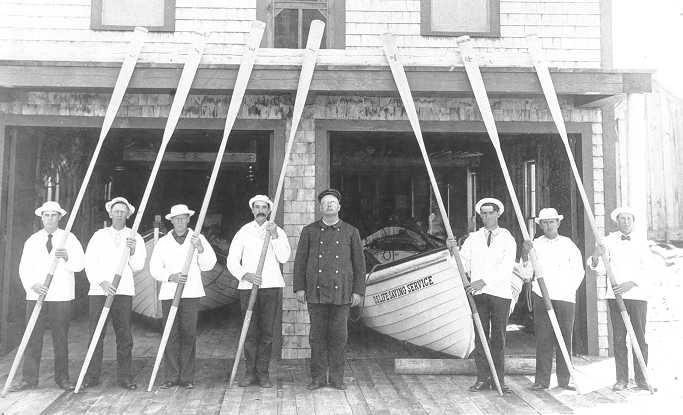
Vermilion Lifesaving Station Keeper and Crew

The Vermilion Lifesaving Station began operation in 1877 on the Lake Superior coast known as the “Graveyard of the Great Lakes” or, the "Shipwreck Coast". Shipwrecks along this coast dramatically increased after the Soo Locks opened this coastline to shipping in 1855. During this time, the United States Life-Saving Service established three other sister life saving stations between Munising and Whitefish Point, Michigan at Crisp Point Light, Deer Park, and Two Hearted River. Vermilion is the only site of the four life saving stations that still has remaining historical structures.

Servicemen considered duty at the Vermilion Live Saving Station so hard and desolate that some called it the “Alcatraz” of the U.S. Life-Saving Service. Life for the men and their families was isolated and monotonous except during dangerous, dramatic rescue operations in boiling seas. For many years there were few roads and supplies were delivered by boat. During the snowbound winter months in the 1930s, they received their mail by dog sled.

The Vermilion surfmen’s rigorous training and drills with self-bailing and self-righting lifeboats in rolling seas made them so skillful that the United States Life Saving Service chose them to demonstrate their life saving at the St. Louis World Fair in 1904.

The United States Life-Saving Service was merged with U.S. Coast Guard in 1915. The advent of bigger and better diesel freighters, better weather forecasting, and improved radio communication and navigational instruments such as radar greatly increased the safety of sailing. During World War II, the Coast Guard found that the life saving stations were no longing serving a useful purpose. The Vermilion Life Saving Station was first merged with the Crisp Point Lifesaving Station as an unmanned sub-station in 1940, and then closed in 1944.

== Cranberry operation ==
The low bog lands and surrounding wetlands, small lakes, ponds, and Sand Creek made Vermilion Point ideally suited for cranberry cultivation. By dividing the bogs with earthen walls and damming Sand Creek, workers harvested the cranberries by combing the vines with narrow-tined forks and floating the ripe, buoyant cranberries that were gathered with wide bottomed scoops. The cranberries were transported by flat bottomed boat to a large water wheel on Sand Creek that scooped them up from a trough and dumped them on a conveyor belt to a mill. After the cranberries were sorted and created for shipping or processed into cats-up or jelly, they were loaded onto small trolley cars, and hauled down a tramway to Lake Superior where they were loaded onto small boats and then transferred to a steamer waiting offshore. The cranberries were shipped to Chicago, Duluth, and other places on the waterways.

The cranberry operation at Vermilion Point lasted from 1887 to 1932 with the greatest production years occurring between 1888 and 1910. Vermilion Point produced 1,600 bushels of cranberries in 1897. Today the earthen walls still exist but the marshes are flooded by beaver dams on the channels. Cranberries can still be found along the edges of the marshes and wet beach areas.

== Hard times ==
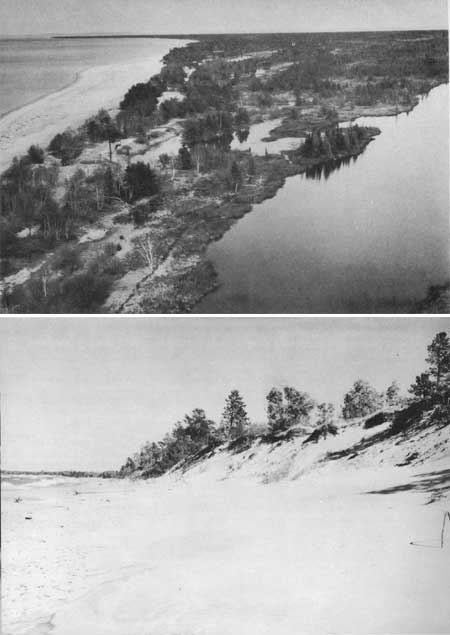
Vermilion Beach 1959 - still pristine today as Vermilion Point Nature Conservancy

When the Coast Guard closed the station, local residents vandalized the original equipment that dated back to 1876 that the Coast Guard left behind. The station was sold to private owners in 1947 for the sum of $17,000. It was reported that motorcycle gangs frequented the station in the 1950s and “hippies” took up summer residence in the 1960s. Four-wheel drive vehicles and snowmobiles destroyed much of the beach grass surrounding the old station in the 1970s.

== Vermilion today ==
In early 1970s the Vermilion Life Saving Station and the surrounding 1.5 miles (2.4 km) undeveloped shoreline was privately purchased for preservation and restoration. Vermilion Point is one of the few Great Lakes sites where the piping plover has successfully nested. By 2004 it was transferred to the Little Traverse Conservancy as the Vermilion Point Nature Preserve that is used by the Lake Superior State University, the Whitefish Point Bird Observatory, and the Michigan Audubon Society for research of the federally endangered piping plover and beach plant community succession as well as student hands-on experience in avian ecology. The property is open to the public for quiet recreation. No motorized vehicles are allowed on the preserve and the areas around piping plover nests and bird-trapping nets are restricted.

Today in 2023, efforts are underway from a non-profit group called S.O.S. Vermillion, to restore the original boat house and residence quarters. https://www.sosvermilion.org/

== See also ==
List of lifesaving stations in Michigan
