= H-58 (Michigan county highway) =

County highway in Alger and Luce counties in Michigan, United States

H-58
- H-58 highlighted in red

Route information
- Maintained by ACRC and LCRC
- Length: 68.985 mi (111.021 km)
- Existed: c. October 5, 1970–present
- Restrictions: Central section closed to vehicular traffic in winter

Major junctions
- West end: M-28 in Munising
- M-77 in Grand Marais
- East end: H-37 in Deer Park

Location
- Country: United States
- State: Michigan
- Counties: Alger, Luce

Highway system
- County-Designated Highways
← H-57	→ H-60

H-58 is a county-designated highway in the US state of Michigan that runs east–west for approximately 69 miles (111 km) between the communities of Munising and Deer Park in the Upper Peninsula. The western section is routed through Pictured Rocks National Lakeshore, along the southern shore of Lake Superior, and the adjacent Lake Superior State Forest in Alger County while connecting Munising to the communities of Van Meer and Melstrand. At Grand Marais, H-58 exits the national lakeshore area and runs through town. The segment running east of Grand Marais to Deer Park in Luce County is a gravel road that connects to H-37 in Muskallonge Lake State Park.

A roadway was present along parts of today's H-58 by the late 1920s; initially, this county road was gravel or earth between Munising and Kingston Corners and connected with other roads to Grand Marais. In the 1930s, another segment was built to connect to Deer Park and to fill in the gap between Kingston Corners and Grand Marais. The southwestern segment between Munising and Van Meer formed part of M-94 from 1929 until it was transferred back to county control in the early 1960s.

The H-58 designation was created after the county-designated highway system itself was formed in 1970. Initially, only the section from Grand Marais to Deer Park was given the number; the remainder was added in 1972. The last sections to be paved in the 20th century were completed in 1974. The National Park Service was required to build their own access road for the Pictured Rocks National Lakeshore in the initial legislation that created the park. This requirement was rescinded by the United States Congress in 1998, and the park service was authorized to fund improvements to H-58 instead. Paving projects were completed between 2006 and 2010 so that the entire length of H-58 in Alger County is now paved; the section in Luce County is still a gravel road.

== Route description ==
H-58 starts in Munising at an intersection with M-28. The highway follows the eastern end of Munising Street through the eastern side of the city by the Neenah Paper Mill, then turns northeasterly. The roadway runs outside of, and parallel to, the southern boundary of the Pictured Rocks National Lakeshore. The park visitors center, which is open year-round, is located off H-58 on Sand Point Road at the west end of the park. The highway turns due east and runs through an intersection with H-13 (Connors Road). Leaving town, H-58 becomes Munising–Van Meer–Shingleton Road and enters the national park. East of the intersection with Carmody Road, the county road passes to the south of the Pictured Rocks Golf and Country Club before meeting the intersection with H-11 (Miners Castle Road). This latter road provides access to Miner's Castle, a natural rock formation located on the shores of Lake Superior, and the Miners Falls. Further east, H-58 meets H-15 in Van Meer, site of the Bear Trap Inn and Bar. Munising–Van Meer–Shingleton Road turns south along H-15, and H-58 turns northeast along Melstrand Road to the community of Melstrand.

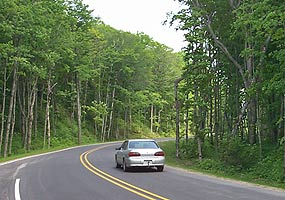
H-58 west of Grand Marais

Melstrand is located outside the national lakeshore in the Lake Superior State Forest. H-58 continues through "burned and cut areas, meadows, maturing second growth, and the haunting sounds of silence" in the state forest. H-58 reenters the national lakeshore and approaches more Pictured Rocks facilities like the Hurricane River Campground. The road then travels northward towards Buck Hill, which is near the intersection with the Adams Truck Trail; at that intersection, there is a parking lot for snowmobiles. Past this point, the road is closed to vehicles during the winter months each year; snow plows do not clear the snow from the roadway, allowing it to be used as a snowmobile trail. The area on each end of the park averages around 140–144 inches (360–370 cm) of snowfall annually, while the National Park Service says that this central section is higher.

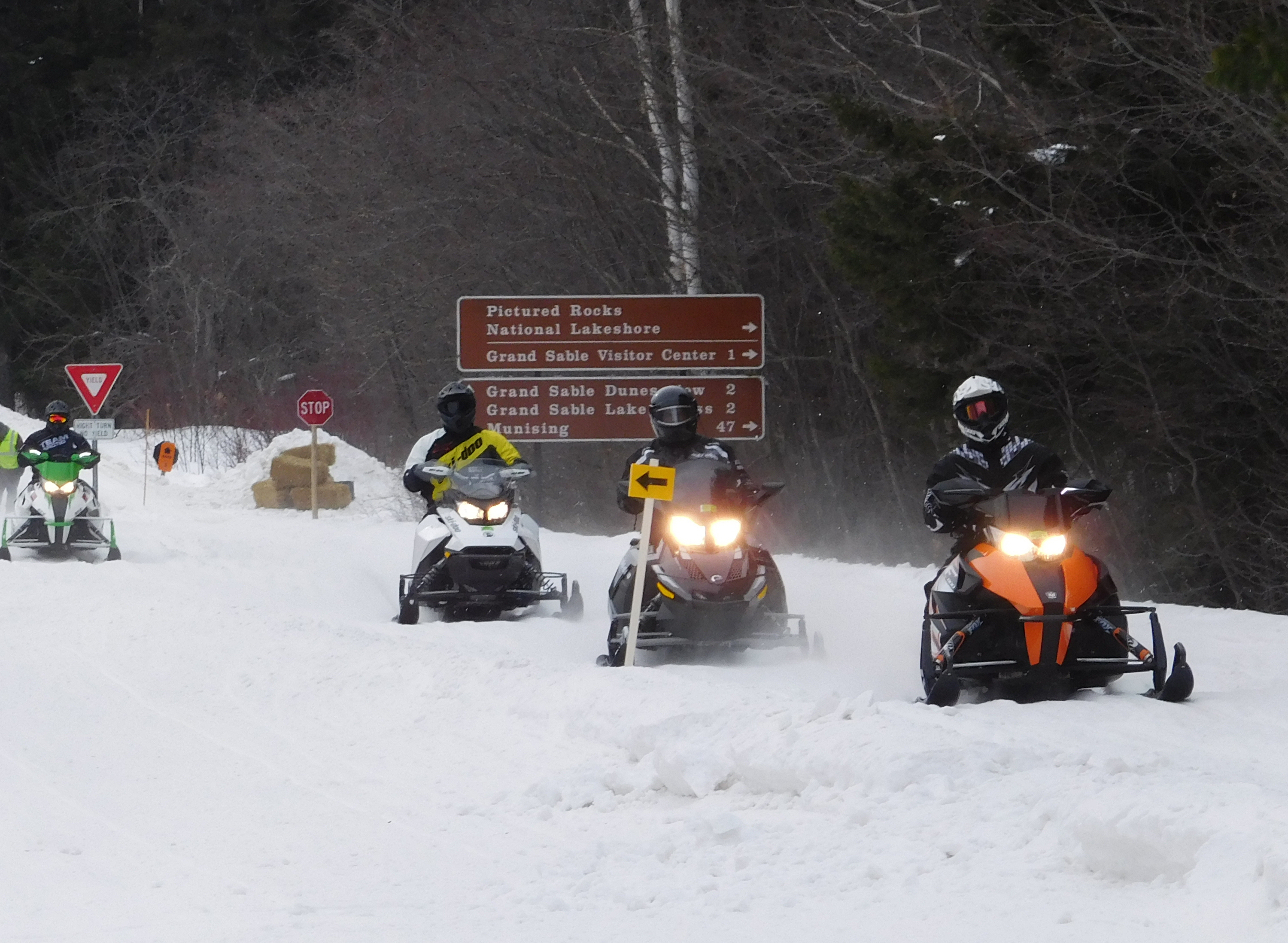
Portions of H-58 are not plowed in the winter months; closed to vehicle traffic, the road is used as a snowmobile trail instead.

The road meanders through forest lands and fields as it continues northwesterly toward the Log Slide. This location gives motorists a chance to hike down to the lakeshore to see the Au Sable Point Lighthouse peeking above the trees to the east and the Grand Sable Dunes to the west. The American Motorcyclist Association said of this segment of the roadway that it is "so close to the beach and lake that [one] can smell it when [he] rides." The lighthouse is listed on the National Register of Historic Places and can be accessed from the Hurricane River Campground. The roadway crosses the Hurricane River and turns southerly away from Lake Superior. H-58 turns back eastward near Grand Sable Lake, running between the north shore of the lake and the Grand Sable Dunes on the south shore of Lake Superior. At the intersection with William Hill and Newburg roads, H-58 makes a 90° curve and travels northward for about three-quarters of a mile (1.2 km). The road turns back eastward next to the Sable Falls parking lot. This lot also marks the eastern end of the segment of H-58 that road crews do not plow. The roadway exits the national park and runs to the community of Grand Marais. On the edge of town is the Woodland Township Park where hikers can walk along the beach to the base of the Grand Sable Dunes that form the east end of the Pictured Rocks National Lakeshore. These dunes reach heights of up to 275 feet (84 m) at a 35° incline. Hikers are advised to use the access points along H-58 to get to the dunes instead of attempting the climb up the face.

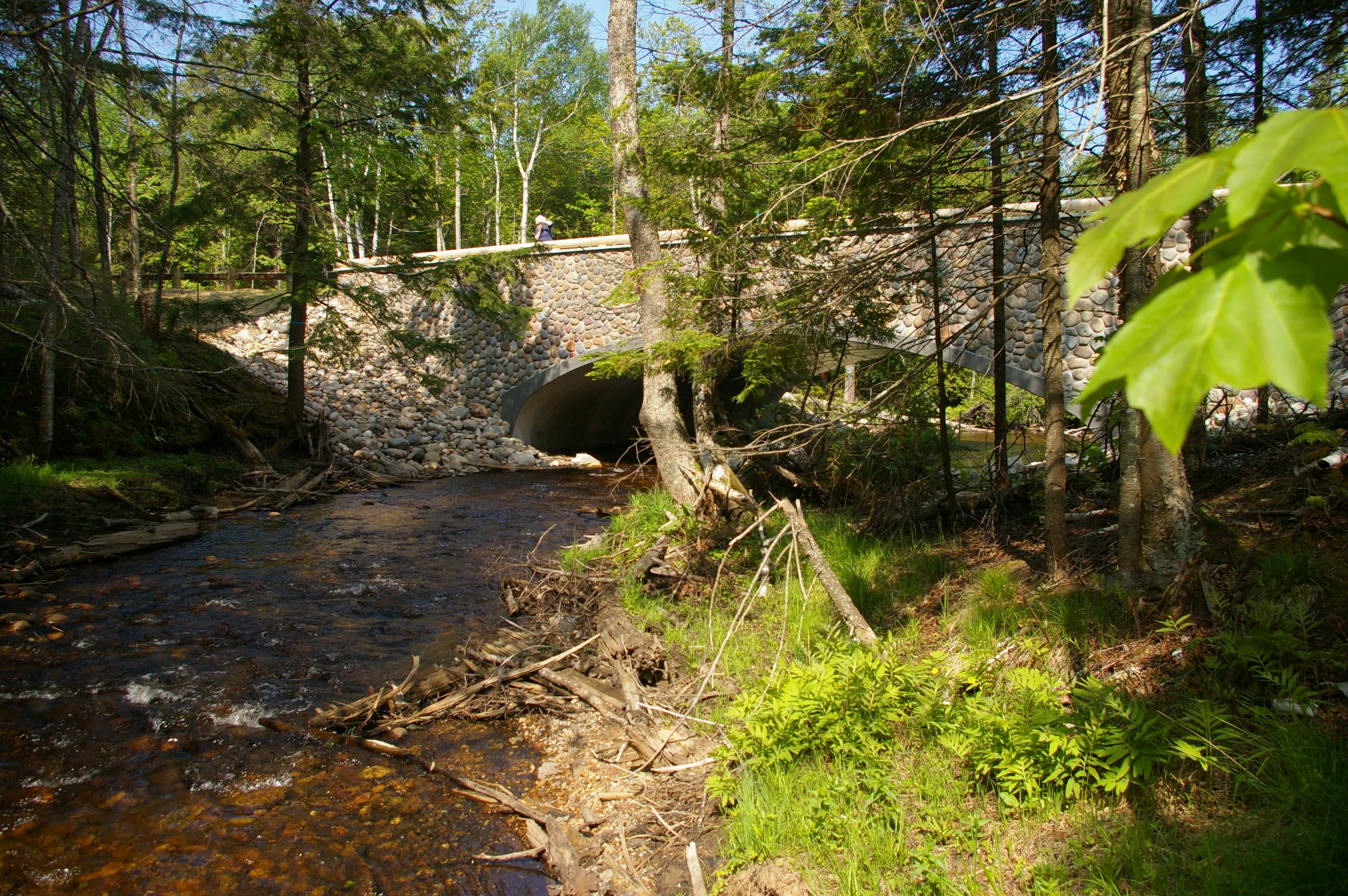
Bridge over the Hurricane River

H-58 meets M-77 in Grand Marais. This town is the location of a small harbor that was once the home of a lumber shipping port. H-58 turns south to run concurrently along M-77 for about two blocks before turning back eastward. The county road runs along the southern edge of the harbor past the township's school and out of town. The pavement ends when the road leaves Alger County for Luce County.

H-58 follows a gravel roadway through the forested northwestern corner of Luce County. The roadway turns northeasterly and runs closer to Lake Superior as it approaches Deer Park. The road also carries the County Road 407 (CR 407) designation and the name Grand Marais Truck Trail. Near the Blind Sucker Flooding, a man-made reservoir, the truck trail turns south to intersect Deer Park Road. H-58 turns east on Deer Park Road and runs between Rainy and Reedy lakes to the south and Lake Superior to the north. The east end of H-58 is at an intersection with H-37 near Muskallonge Lake State Park in Deer Park, north of Newberry. Deer Park is the location of a trio of resorts and remnants of a community that once included a sawmill, hotel and store. The state park is located on the shore of Muskallonge Lake and is visited by about 71,000 people each year.

== History ==
=== Road origins ===
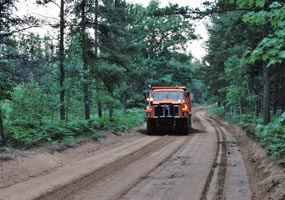
Grading the gravel section of H-58 in Alger County before 2007

A county road along part of the route of H-58 was present at by at least 1927; the road ran east and northeasterly from Munising to Kingston Corners where it followed what is now Adams Trail east to M-77. A second county road ran westward from Grand Marais. By 1929, M-94 was rerouted through Alger County to follow Munising–Van Meer–Shingleton Road east from Munising to Van Meer and then south to Shingleton; that routing followed what is now H-58 and H-15. The section of county road between Van Meer and Melstrand was surfaced in gravel by 1936 with the remainder only an earthen road. By the end of the year, an earthen road was constructed east of Grand Marais to Deer Park. After the end of World War II, the gravel segment was extended north of Melstrand to the Buck Hill area, and the earthen road was extended between the Adams Trail and Grand Marais by way of Au Sable Point. East of Grand Marais, the roadway was improved with gravel to the county line. In late 1946 or early 1947, the first two miles (3.2 km) east of Grand Marais were paved; additional sections in Luce County were improved to gravel. All of the earthen road segments of what is now H-58 were improved to gravel road by the middle of 1958; the section between Van Meer and Melstrand as well as a section east of Grand Marais were paved.

In the early 1960s, M-94 was moved to follow M-28 between Munising and Shingleton. The section of Munising–Van Meer–Shingleton Road east of the junction with Connors Road was returned to county control by the middle of 1960, and the remainder westward into Munising was turned over on November 7, 1963. In late 1961, about three miles (4.8 km) was paved to the west of Grand Marais. The county-designated highway system was created around October 5, 1970, and the section of H-58 was shown on state maps for the first time in 1971. Initially, only the section between Grand Marais and Deer Park was marked as part of H-58. Within two years, the remainder was marked as H-58 from Munising northeasterly to Grand Marais; between Connors and Miners Castle roads, it was also marked as a section of H-13 where the two designations ran concurrently together. In 1974, the road was paved from Melstrand north to the Buck Hill area. The H-13 concurrency was removed in 2004 when the northern segment of H-13 along Miners Castle Road was redesignated H-11.

=== Park service gets involved ===
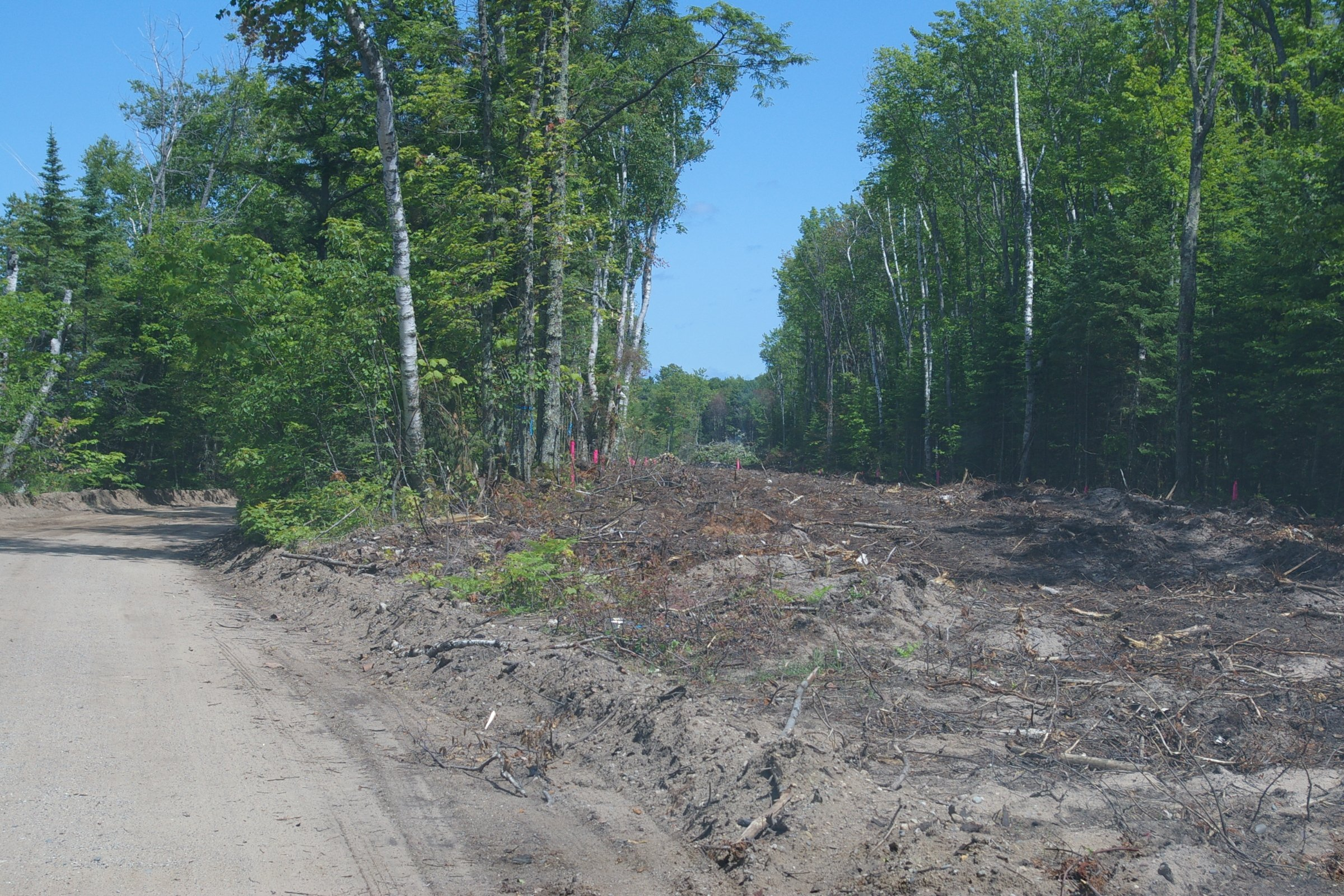
Clearing for paving project summer 2009

The Pictured Rocks National Lakeshore was authorized on October 15, 1966, when President Lyndon Johnson signed into law the enabling legislation. The park was inaugurated on October 6, 1972, in ceremonies in Munising. The original legislation that created the park included a mandate to build an access road along Lake Superior. When the National Park Service (NPS) conducted environmental studies on such a road in the mid-1990s, they decided on a 13-mile-long (21 km) road called the Beaver Basin Rim Road between Twelvemile Beach and Legion Lake. Area residents opposed the plan, preferring that the federal government instead improve the existing H-58. Representative Bart Stupak lobbied his colleagues in Congress in 1996, saying that building the new road would cost twice as much as improving the existing H-58; Stupak also introduced legislation to remove the construction mandate from the park.

In 1997, the Alger County Road Commission (ACRC) initially decided to close an eight-mile (13 km) section of H-58 to tourist traffic and only allow local residents and logging trucks access to the roadway. Then it decided to completely close the section to all traffic. This decision was rescinded in August of that year. Instead, the commission wanted the Michigan Department of Transportation (MDOT) or another agency to take control of H-58 from Munising to Grand Marais. In a letter that October, Stupak and Senator Carl Levin urged the ACRC to deed over 18 miles (29 km) of the roadway within the park boundaries to the NPS. The NPS agreed to pay $5.6 million of the estimated $9.2 million (equivalent to $10.1 million of $16.6 million in 2024) to rebuild the roadway. The commission rejected this proposal in October citing distrust that the NPS would carry through with paving the roadway if they received ownership of it.

Because H-58 was under the jurisdiction of the county, and not the park, it was ineligible for park service funding. Appropriations legislation passed by Congress in 1998 allowed the NPS to fund road improvements in the Pictured Rocks National Lakeshore for county-maintained roads. Additional legislation reintroduced and sponsored by Stupak was also passed, removing the original road construction mandate from the park. On November 12, 1998, President Bill Clinton signed the legislation which cleared the last hurdles; the NPS was prohibited from building that road and instead authorized to help the ACRC improve H-58. In 2005, the Safe, Accountable, Flexible, Efficient Transportation Equity Act: A Legacy for Users budgeted $13.3 million (equivalent to $20.5 million in 2024) for the paving and reconstruction project.

The ACRC implemented a five-stage plan to pave the remaining sections of the road between the Melstrand area and Grand Marais utilizing NPS funding. Plans were put into place by July 2006 to straighten some tight curves and realign the roadway in places. The commission designed the updated road for travel speeds of 40 mph (64 km/h) "to maintain the nature of the road and the park setting." One phase was divided into subsections to accommodate the bridge across the Hurricane River.

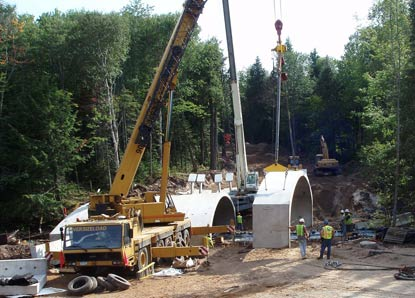
Construction to build the bridge over the Hurricane River in 2010

Funding on the paving project between Buck Hill and the boundary of the national lakeshore was held up, pending passage of a technical corrections bill by the US Senate. The original funding authorization specified that sections were being repaved; instead they were being paved for the first time or realigned. A technical corrections bill solved the legal hurdles involved. The road commission used state matching grants from MDOT to complete the financing needed to pave the roadway. Local officials received the checks to pay for the projects at a ceremony in August 2008. While the county completed a segment on their own in 2006, the 2008 projects paved segments of the roadway outside of the national lakeshore boundaries from Buck Hill northwards. Construction in 2009 and 2010 completed the roadway inside the park boundaries, including a new bridge over the Hurricane River.

The final section was dedicated at a ribbon-cutting ceremony on October 15, 2010, which marked the official opening to traffic. Final work was continued through the end of that month to complete the Hurricane River Bridge. Since the road was completed, traffic has increased. After paving, the new road has reduced travel times between Munising and Grand Marais from 90 to 45 minutes. Not all residents have been happy with the updated H-58; thousands of nails have been scattered along the road, and have led to flat tires on many vehicles. Police said at the time they believed it was intentional, but had no motive for the vandalism. Since the thoroughfare has re-opened, motorcyclists now frequent the highway, and a local group has named H-58 "one of the top five motorcycling roads in Upper Michigan", and it has been promoted by the American Motorcyclist Association in their guidebooks; riders enjoy the 198 curves and scenic vistas along the road.

== Major intersections ==
County	Location	mi	km	Destinations	Notes
Alger	Munising	0.000	0.000	M-28 / LSCT (Cedar Street, Munising Avenue) – Marquette, Newberry	
Alger	Munising Township	2.114	3.402	H-13 south (Connors Road) – Wetmore	Northern terminus of H-13; H-58 enters the Pictured Rocks National Lakeshore
Alger	Munising Township	5.286	8.507	H-11 north (Miners Castle Road) – Miners Castle	Southern terminus of H-11
Alger	Van Meer	9.225	14.846	H-15 south (Munising–Van Meer–Shingleton Road) – Shingleton	Northern terminus of H-15
Alger	Melstrand	13.743	22.117	Melstrand Truck Trail east	Western terminus of the former H-52
Alger	Grand Marais	49.743	80.054	M-77 north (Lake Avenue)	Northern end of M-77 concurrency just south of M-77 northern terminus; H-58 exits the Pictured Rocks National Lakeshore
Alger	Grand Marais	49.897	80.301	M-77 south (Lake Avenue) – Seney	Southern end of M-77 concurrency
Luce	Deer Park	68.985	111.021	H-37 south (CR 407) – Newberry	Eastern terminus of H-58 and northern terminus of H-37
1.000 mi = 1.609 km; 1.000 km = 0.621 mi: Concurrency terminus
