= Muskallonge Lake State Park =

Park in Michigan, USA

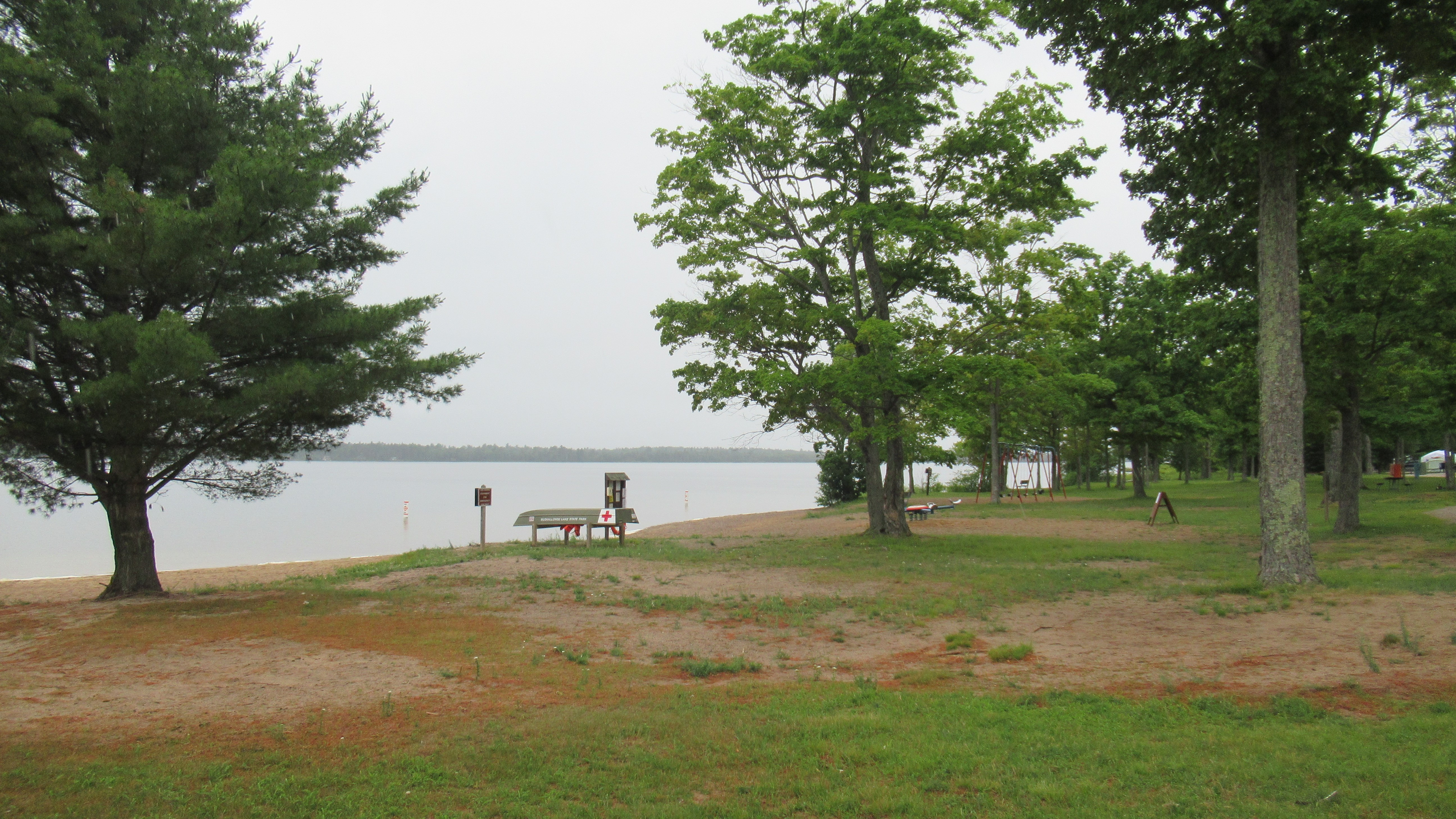
- Beachfront along Muskallonge Lake

- Location within Michigan Location within the United States
- Location: Deer Park, McMillan Township, Luce County, Michigan, United States
- Coordinates: 46°40′35″N 85°38′09″W
- Area: 217 acres (88 ha)
- Elevation: 643 feet (196 m)
- Established: 1956
- Administrator: Michigan Department of Natural Resources
- Designation: Michigan state park
- Website: Official website

Muskallonge Lake State Park is a state park located in Luce County in the U.S. state of Michigan. It is located in Deer Park about 16 miles (25.7 km) east of Grand Marais along H-58.

The park encompasses 217 acres (87.8 ha) between the shores of Lake Superior and Muskallonge Lake where Native Americans once had an encampment and where a station of the United States Life-Saving Service once stood.

== History ==
The park occupies land just west of Deer Park, a 19th-century mill town that all but disappeared once the forests on which its mill depended were gone. The state park is also the site of former Station Muskallong Lake (Coast Guard Station #295; later called Station Deer Park), one of five such stations along the coast of Lake Superior between Munising and Whitefish Point in the Upper Peninsula. It was part of U.S. Life-Saving Service District 10 (later part of District 11). The other four stations along Lake Superior's "Shipwreck Coast" were Grand Marais, Two Heart, Crisp Point Light, and Vermilion Point.

Deer Park Life-Saving Station was in service from 1876 to 1909. The park was transferred from the Forestry Division to Parks and Recreation Division in 1957.

== Activities and amenities ==
The park offers swimming and fishing and includes a 159-site campground, boat launch, picnic area, playground, and trails for hiking and snow-mobiling. The park has the darkest skies for a state park in the entire state of Michigan, which makes the state park a great place for astronomy.

== Images ==
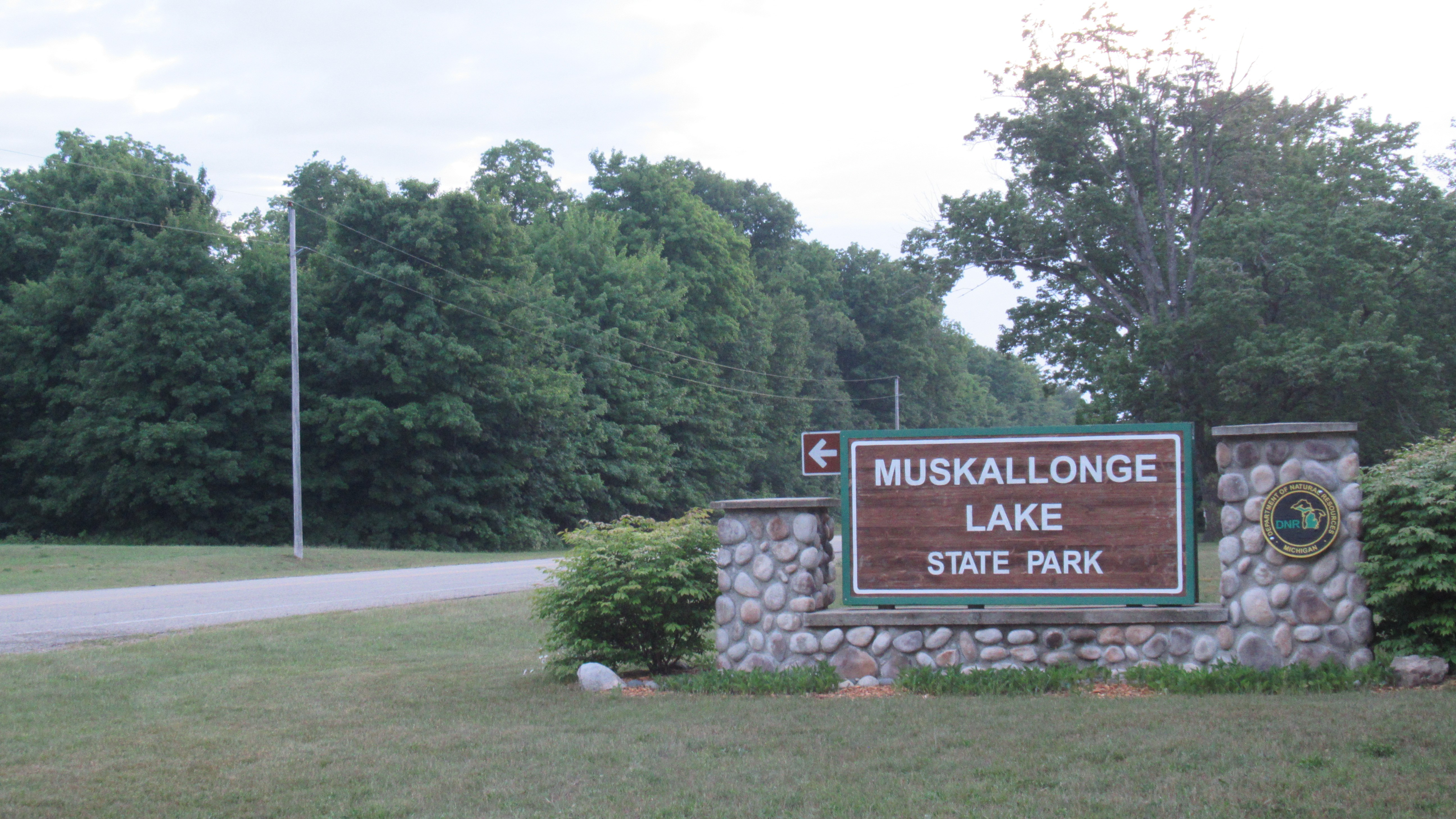
Entrance along Deer Park Road (H-58)

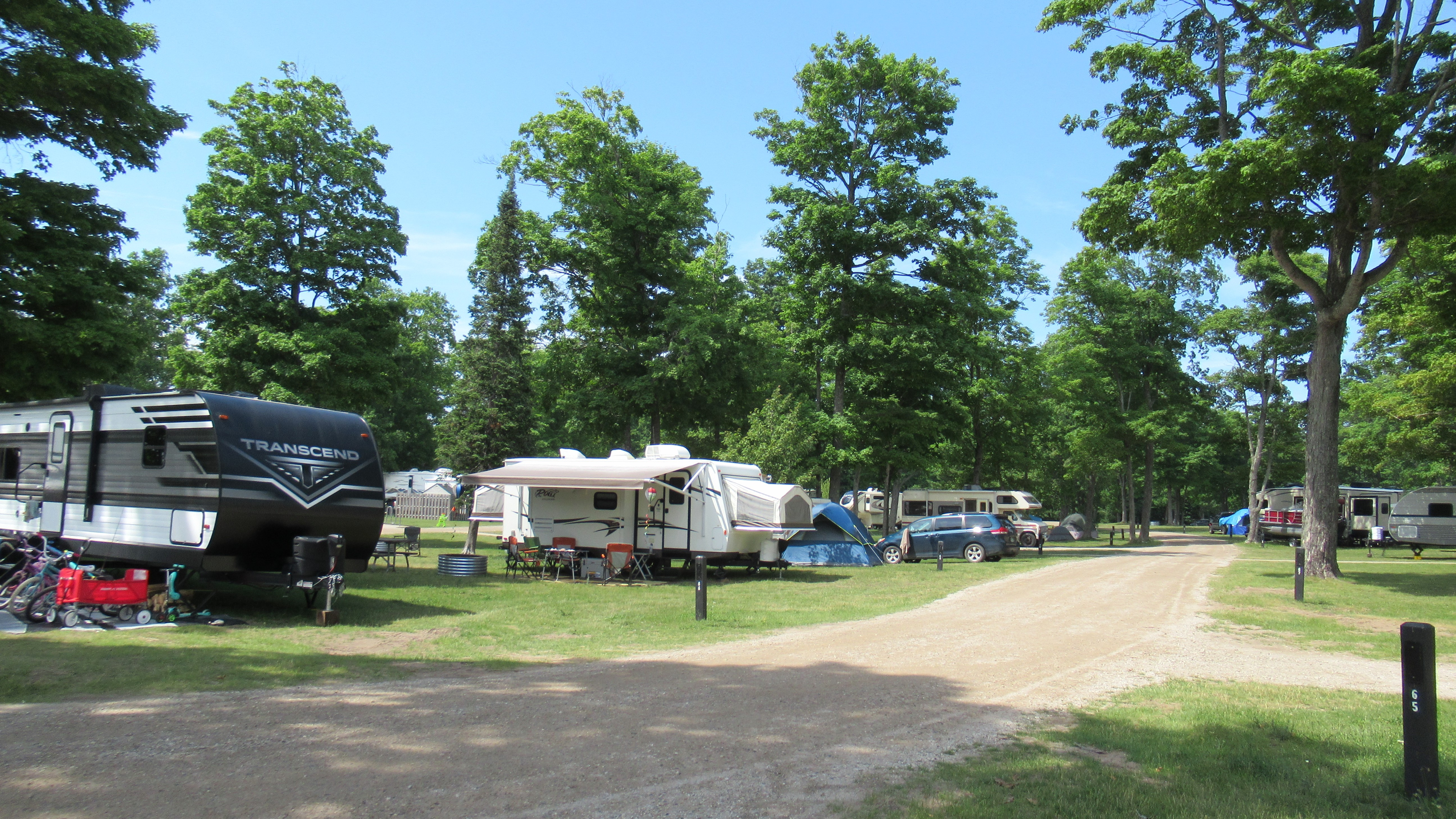
State park campground

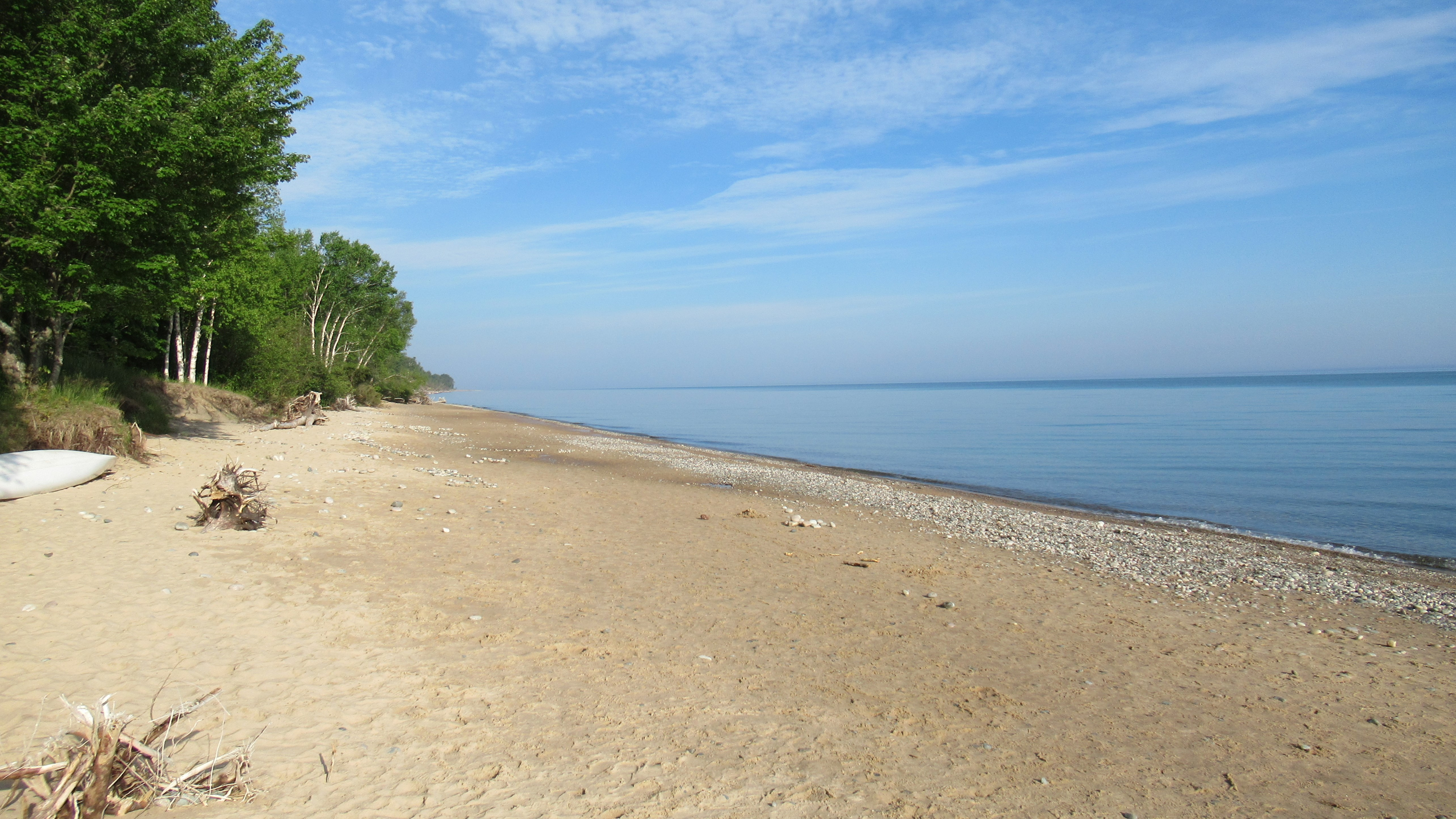
Lake Superior beachfront

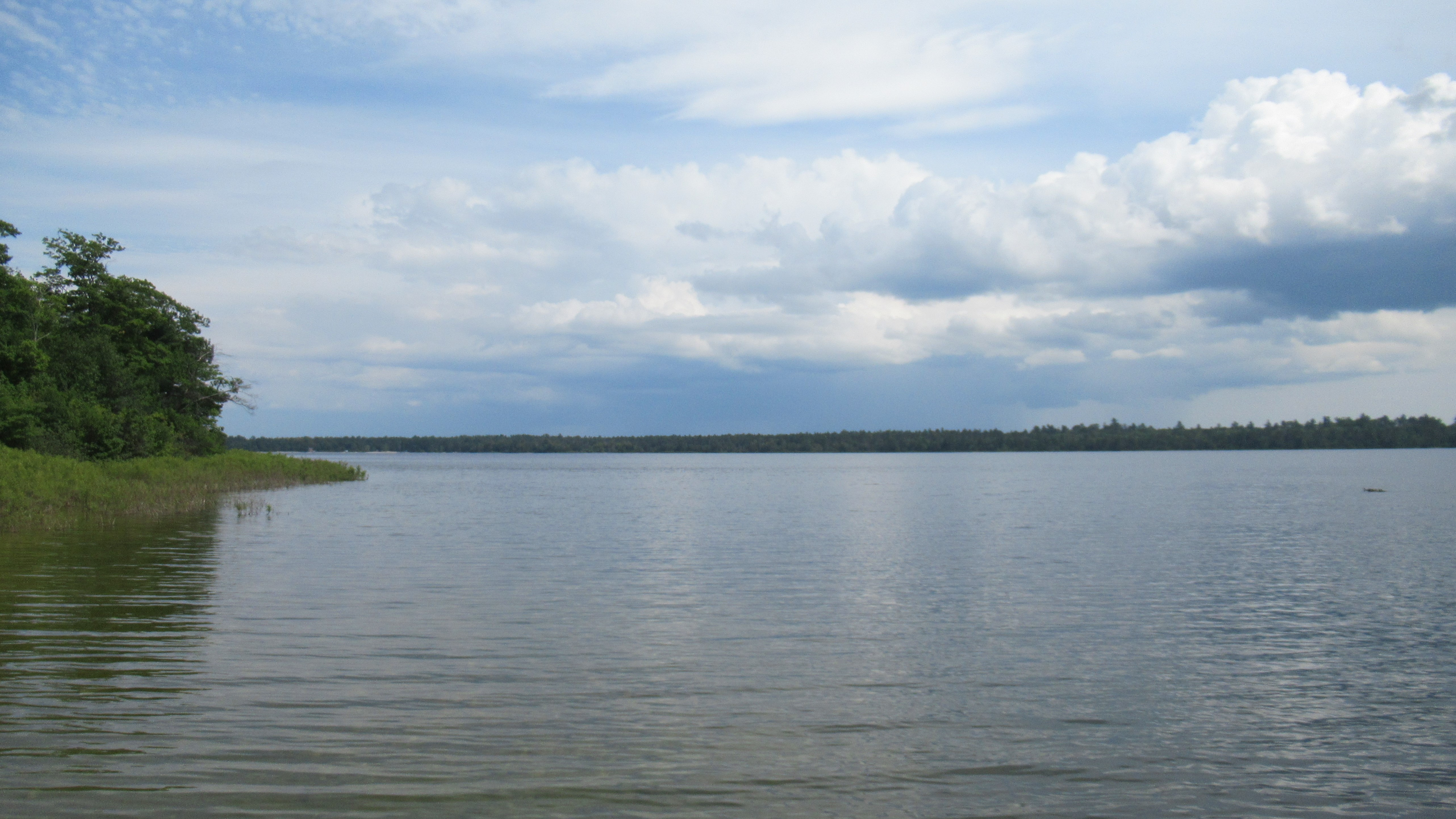
Muskallonge Lake shoreline

== See also ==
- List of lifesaving stations in Michigan
