= Miners Falls =

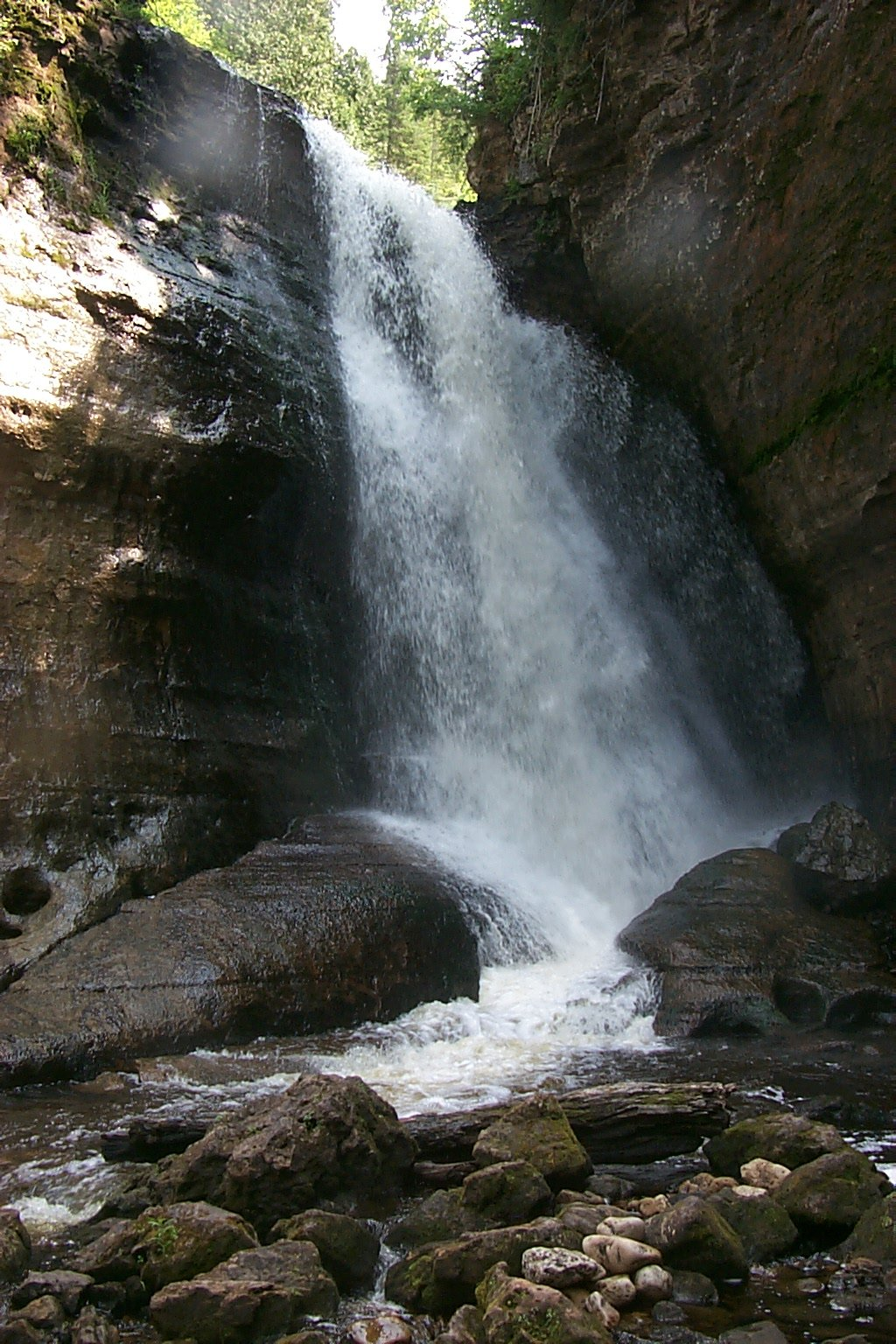
- View of Miners Falls from below
- Interactive map of Miners Falls
- Location: Pictured Rocks National Lakeshore, Michigan
- Coordinates: 46.47444°N 86.53056°W
- Total height: 40 feet (12 m)
- Watercourse: Miners River

Miners Falls is a waterfall located on Miners River in the western portion of the Pictured Rocks National Lakeshore in Alger County, Michigan. The falls drops about 40 feet (12 m) over a sandstone outcrop with a 10-foot (3.0 m) crest. The falls can be accessed by a 0.6 mile gravel path, with stairs leading to a lookout.

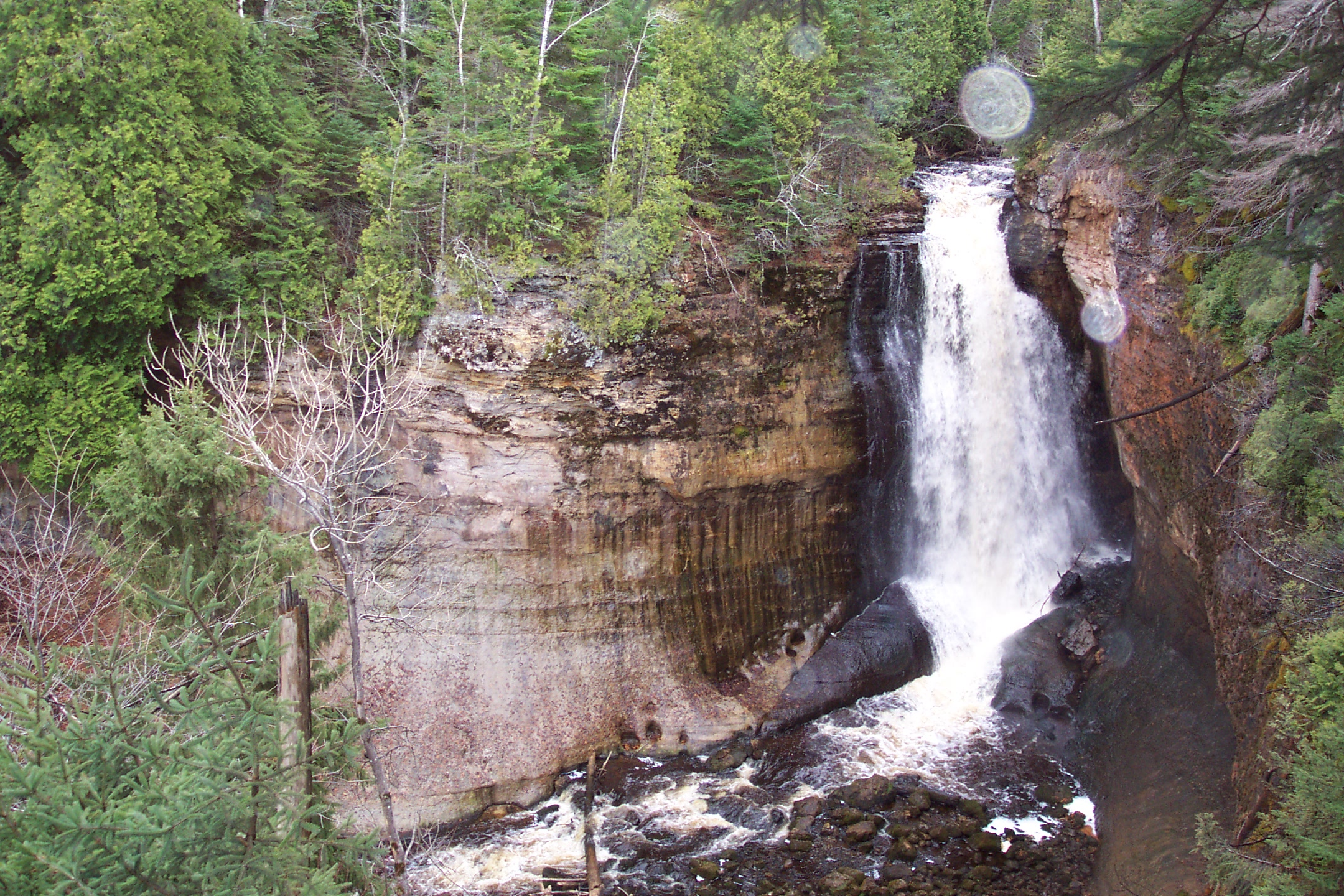
Miners Falls

== See also ==
- List of waterfalls
