= Au Train Formation =

Geologic formation in Michigan, United States

- Stratigraphic range: Early Ordovician
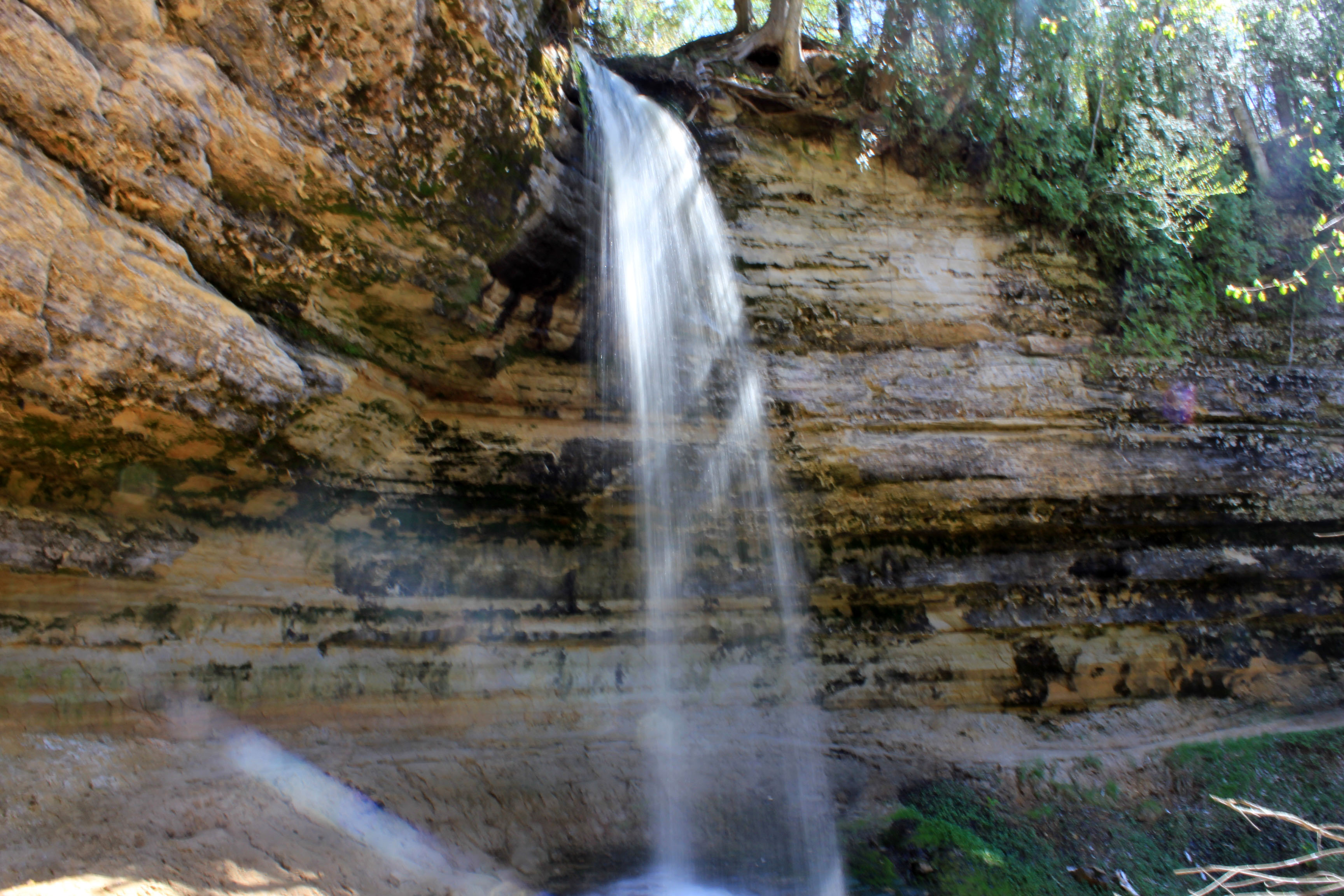
- Au Train Formation at Munising Falls (Pictured Rocks National Lakeshore)
- Type: Formation
- Underlies: Black River Formation
- Overlies: Munising Formation

Location
- Region: Michigan
- Country: United States

The Au Train Formation is a geologic formation in Michigan. It preserves fossils dating back to the Ordovician period.
