= Bridalveil Falls (Michigan) =

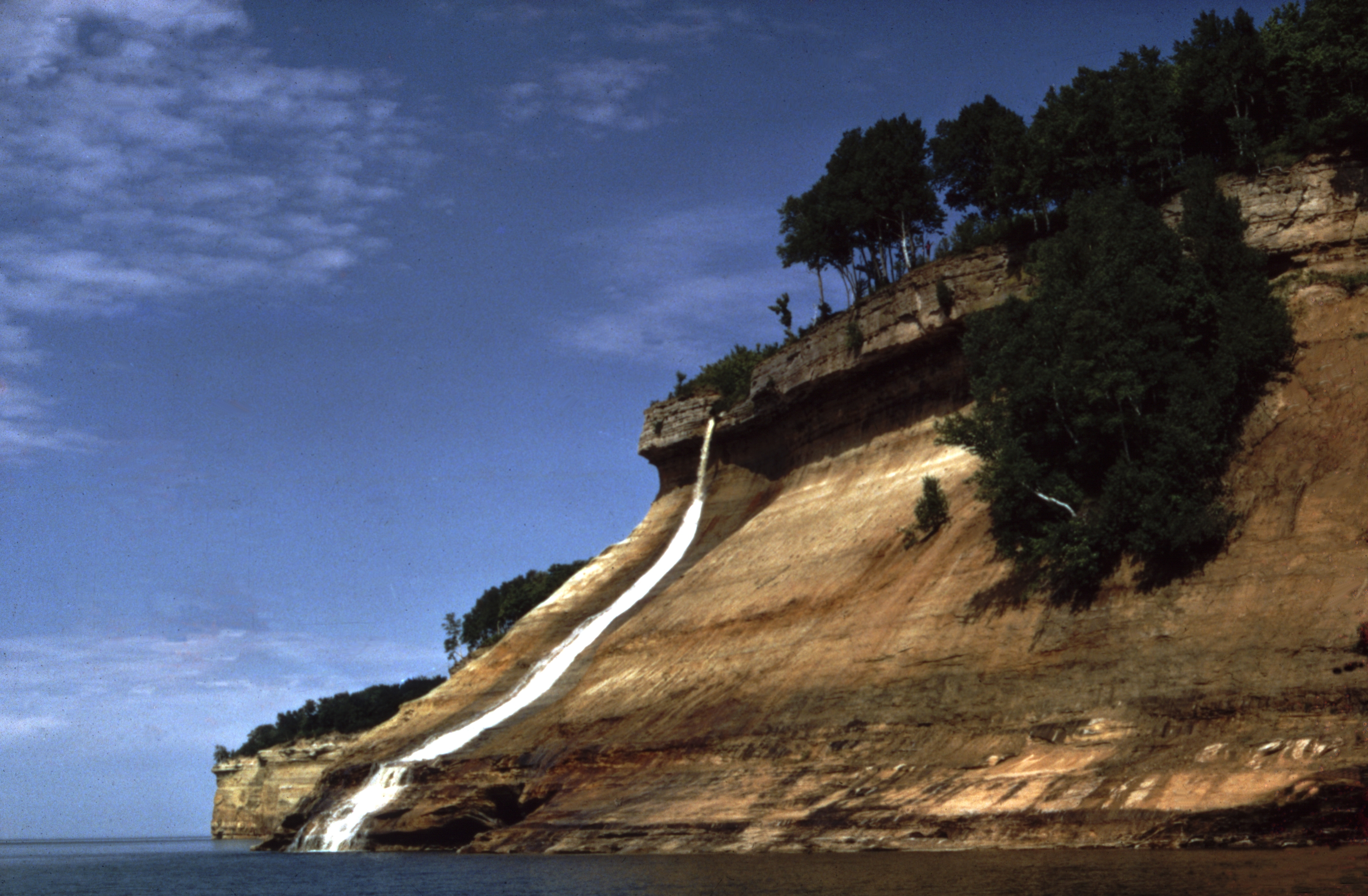
- Bridalveil Falls, Michigan

- Location within Michigan
- Location: Alger County, Michigan, United States
- Coordinates: Maps 46°30′30″N 86°31′23″W
- Type: Plunge Horsetail
- Total height: 140 feet (43 m)

Bridalveil Falls is a seasonal waterfall located at Pictured Rocks National Lakeshore, Michigan. From H-58 from Munising it can be reached by going east 4.5 miles (7.2 km) to Miners Castle Road, then going 5 miles (8.0 km) to the Castle. It can be seen from afar from here. It can also be seen from the lake in a boat, or hiking on the Lakeshore Trail (although only partial views from a distance can be seen from the trail itself. A dangerous view of the crest can be seen after a short hike from the trail).

== See also ==
- List of waterfalls
