= Au Sable Light =

Lighthouse in Michigan, United States

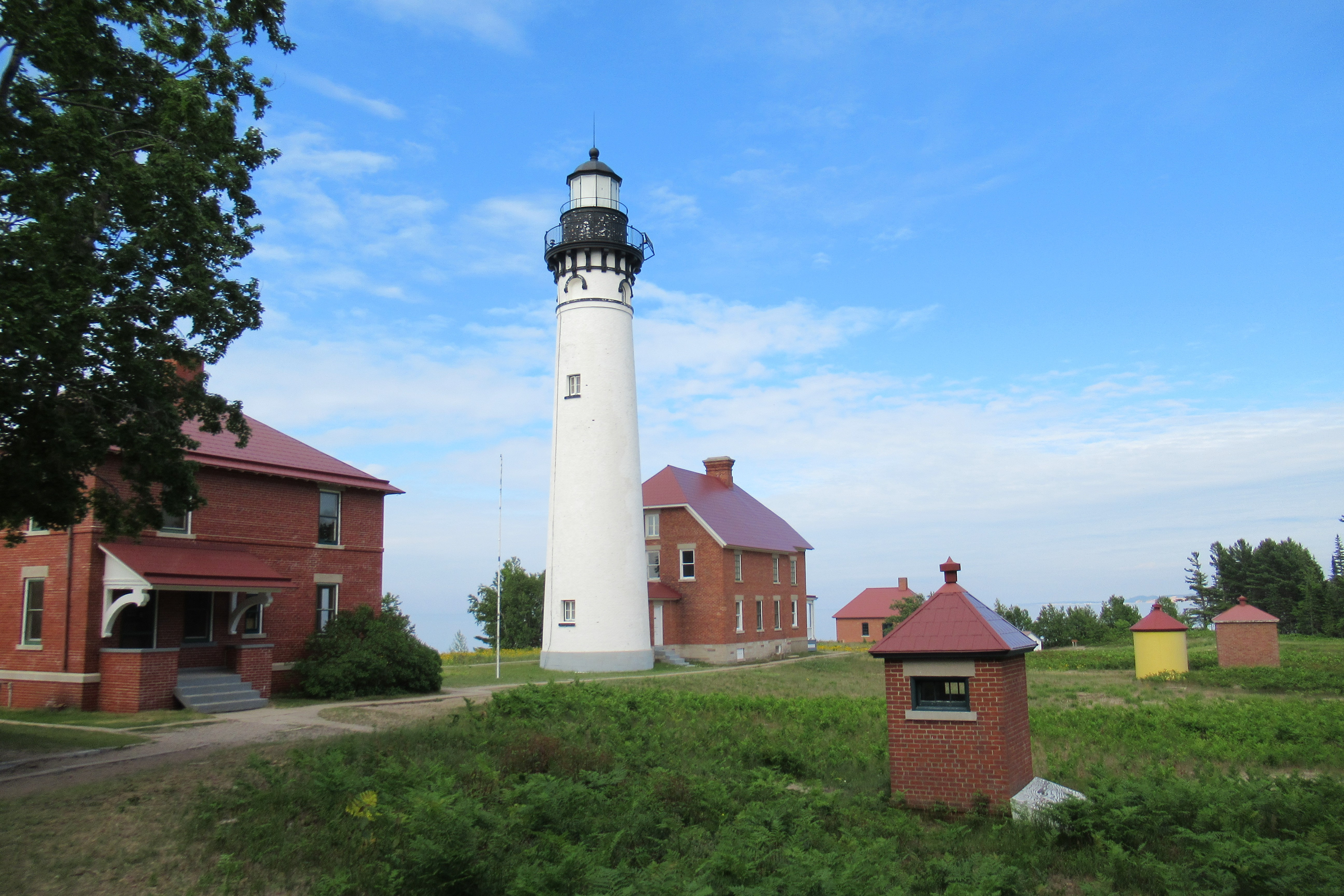
- Au Sable Light complex in June 2021
- Location: Pictured Rocks National Lakeshore on Lake Superior
- Coordinates: 46°40′23″N 86°08′21.6″W

Tower
- Constructed: 1874
- Foundation: Wood pilings
- Construction: Brick, Italianate bracketing
- Automated: 1958
- Height: 87 feet (27 m)
- Shape: Frustum of a cone
- Markings: White with black lantern
- Heritage: National Register of Historic Places listed place, Michigan State Historic Site

Light
- First lit: 1874
- Focal height: 107 feet (33 m)
- Lens: Third-order Fresnel lens (original), 12-inch (300 mm) acrylic (current)
- Range: 11 nautical miles (20 km; 13 mi)
- Characteristic: Flashing white every 6 s
- Au Sable Light Station
- U.S. National Register of Historic Places
- Michigan State Historic Site
- Nearest city: Grand Marais, Michigan
- Area: 5 acres (2.0 ha)
- Architect: Col. Orlando M. Poe
- Architectural style: Italianate bracketing
- NRHP reference No.: 78000374

Significant dates
- Added to NRHP: May 23, 1978
- Designated MSHS: September 21, 1976

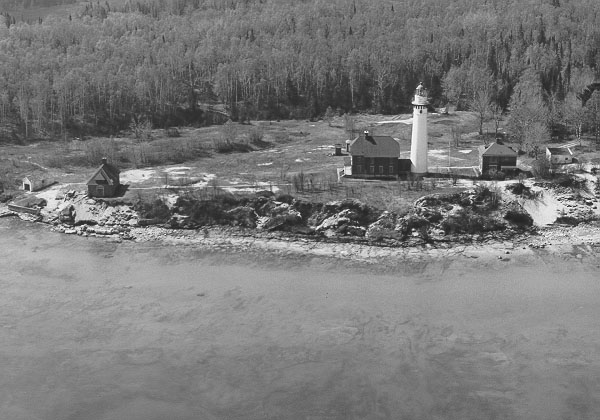
Undated historic photo of the lighthouse

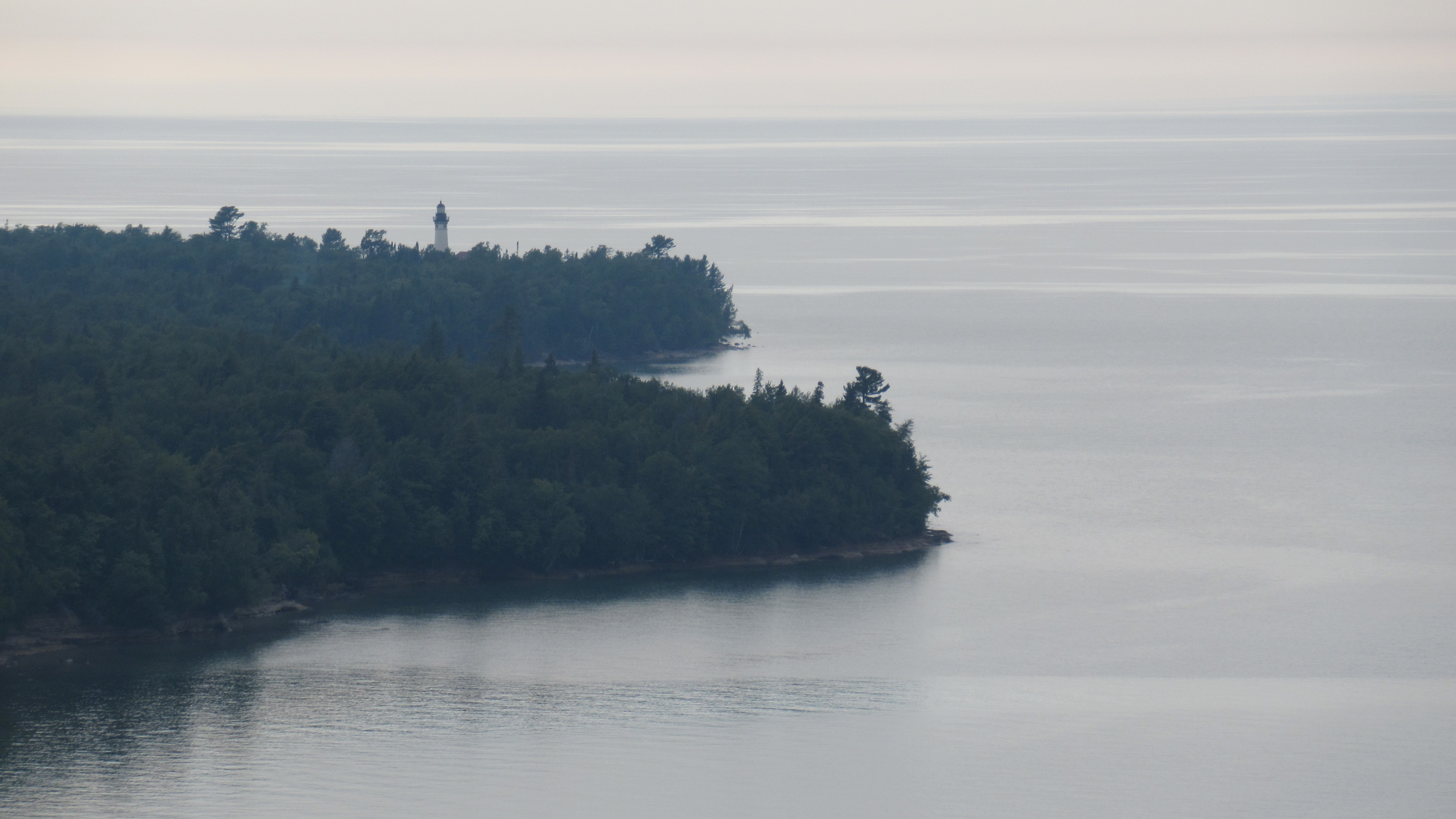
Distant view of the lighthouse from Grand Sable Dunes

Au Sable Light is an active lighthouse in the Pictured Rocks National Lakeshore west of Grand Marais, Michigan off H-58. Until 1910, this aid to navigation was called "Big Sable Light" (not to be confused with Big Sable Point Light near Ludington, Michigan on Lake Michigan or Little Sable Point Light south of Pentwater, Michigan).

== History ==
The Au Sable Light Station was built in 1874 on Au Sable Point, a well known hazard on Lake Superior's "shipwreck coast". The Au Sable Point reef is a shallow ridge of sandstone that in places is only 6 feet (1.8 m) below the surface and extends nearly 1 mile (1.6 km) into Lake Superior. The Au Sable Point reef was one of the greatest dangers facing ships coasting along the south shore of Lake Superior during the early shipping days when keeping land in sight was the main navigational method. The Au Sable Point reef was known as a "ship trap" that ensnared many ships, including the passenger ship Lady Elgin which was stranded there in 1859.

The shoreline in this area is considered one of North America's most beautiful, "but in the 1800s it was considered one of the most deadly because of unpredictable features below the surface and violent storms and blinding fogs above." The reef extends nearly a mile out as a ridge of sandstone a few feet below the surface. The shallow water caught many a vessel following the shore. Turbulence was common when the lake was "pushed in by violent storms out of the north and northwest." Thick fogs resulted form the mix of frigid lake air and warmth from the sand dunes. "As early as 1622, French explorers called the region 'most dangerous when there is any storms'."

Additionally, the location was chosen to eliminate a "dark spot" in the 80 miles (130 km) stretch between Granite Island Light and Whitefish Point Light.

The lighthouse tower and attached keepers' quarters were designed by Colonel Orlando Metcalfe Poe. In this capacity he designed eight "Poe style lighthouses" and oversaw construction of several. Poe was named District Engineer for the Eleventh Lighthouse District, Those lights are New Presque Isle Light (1870) on Lake Huron, Lake Michigan's South Manitou Island Light (1872), Grosse Point Light (1873) in Evanston, Illinois, Lake Superior's Au Sable Light (1874), Racine, Wisconsin's Wind Point Light (1880); Outer Island Light (1874) in the Apostle Islands, Little Sable Point Light (1874) on Lake Michigan, Manistique, Michigan's Seul Choix Light (1895) and Spectacle Reef Light.

The tower is a white brick conical tower with a black lantern. A red brick lightkeeper's house stands next to the lighthouse. It originally had a third-order Fresnel lens, which is now on display at the light station. The lighthouse was automated in 1958 and is currently equipped with a 12-inch (300 mm) solar-powered light.

A wooden boathouse was added in 1875; the fog signal building was added in 1897; the keepers' quarters were converted to a duplex in 1909; and the steel oil house was raised in 1915. There is also a second brick Keepers house (1909), a kerosene storage shed (1895), two brick outhouses (1874/1909), a wooden woodshed and boathouse (1875), a brick cistern, and a two vehicle wood frame garage (1954). Most of these buildings are still extant; only one outhouse remains standing.

The keeper's house was renovated. A visitor center is on the lower floor and an apartment for volunteer caretakers on the upper floor.

In 1996, the original Third Order Fresnel lens was returned to the tower after 39 years on display at the Pictured Rocks Nautical and Maritime Museum, also known as the Grand Marais Maritime Museum in Grand Marais. However, it is an external 300 mm lens that is operative.

The steam whistle and airhorn have been removed. Nevertheless, the "boarded lantern area is an impressive sight."

The lighthouse tower is open to the public in summer. The complex was maintained by the National Park Service, and the automated light continues to be operated by the United States Coast Guard. The National Park Service's stated goal is to continue to maintain the lighthouse complex to its 1909–10 appearance, during its first year of operation as a two-person Lighthouse keeper station.

The Light Station is part of the National Park Service's Pictured Rocks National Lakeshore. The Au Sable Light Station is on the National Register of Historic Places, #78000374.

To visit this light, take H-58 from the Hurricane River Campground, which is 12 miles (19 km) west of Grand Marais, Michigan. From the Campground the lighthouse is a 1.5-mile (2.4 km) walk on a sand trail.

== See also ==
- Lighthouses in the United States
