= Pictured Rocks National Lakeshore =

U.S. National Lakeshore on Lake Superior

- IUCN category III (natural monument or feature)
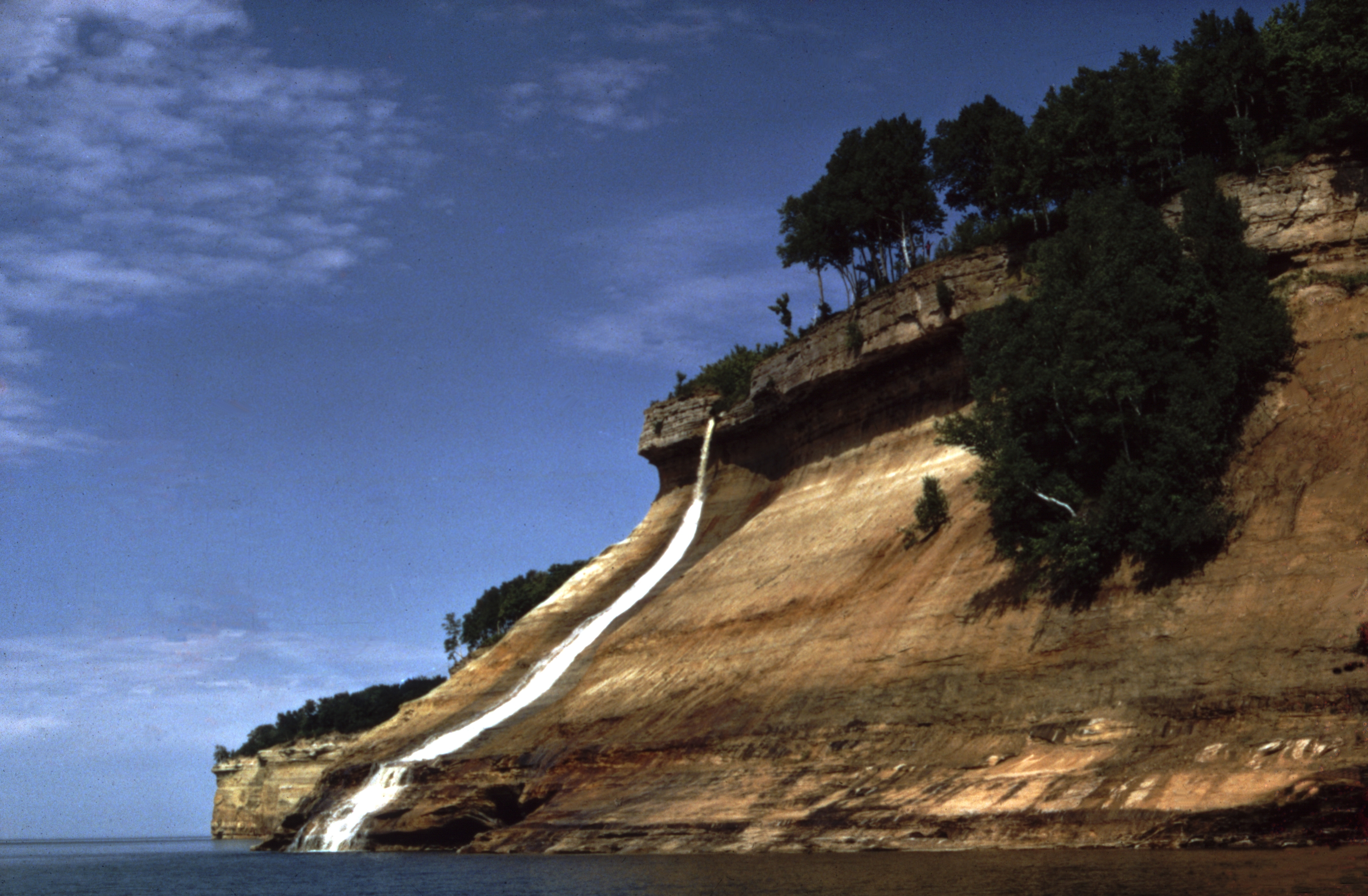
- Bridalveil Falls emptying into Lake Superior

- Location within Michigan Location within the United States
- Interactive map of Pictured Rocks National Lakeshore
- Location: Alger County, Michigan, U.S.
- Nearest city: Munising, Michigan, U.S.
- Coordinates: 46°33′44″N 86°18′45″W
- Area: 73,236 acres (296.38 km^{2})
- Established: October 15, 1966
- Visitors: 953,052 (in 2024)
- Governing body: National Park Service
- Website: Pictured Rocks National Lakeshore

Michigan State Historic Site
- Official name: Pictured Rocks
- Designated: February 17, 1965

Pictured Rocks National Lakeshore is a U.S. National Lakeshore in the Upper Peninsula of Michigan, United States. It extends for 42 mi (68 km) along the shore of Lake Superior and covers 73,236 acres (114 sq mi; 296 km^{2}). The park has extensive views of the hilly shoreline between Munising and Grand Marais in Alger County, with picturesque rock formations, waterfalls, and sand dunes.

Pictured Rocks derives its name from the 13 miles (24 km) of colorful sandstone cliffs northeast of Munising. The cliffs reach up to 200 feet (60 m) above lake level. They have been naturally sculptured into a variety of shallow caves, arches, and formations resembling castle turrets and human profiles. Near Munising, visitors can also visit Grand Island, most of which are included in the separate Grand Island National Recreation Area.

The U.S. Congress designated Pictured Rocks the first national lakeshore in the United States in 1966. It is governed by the National Park Service (NPS), with 22 year-round NPS employees as of May 2006, and received 1.31 million visitors in 2021.

== History ==
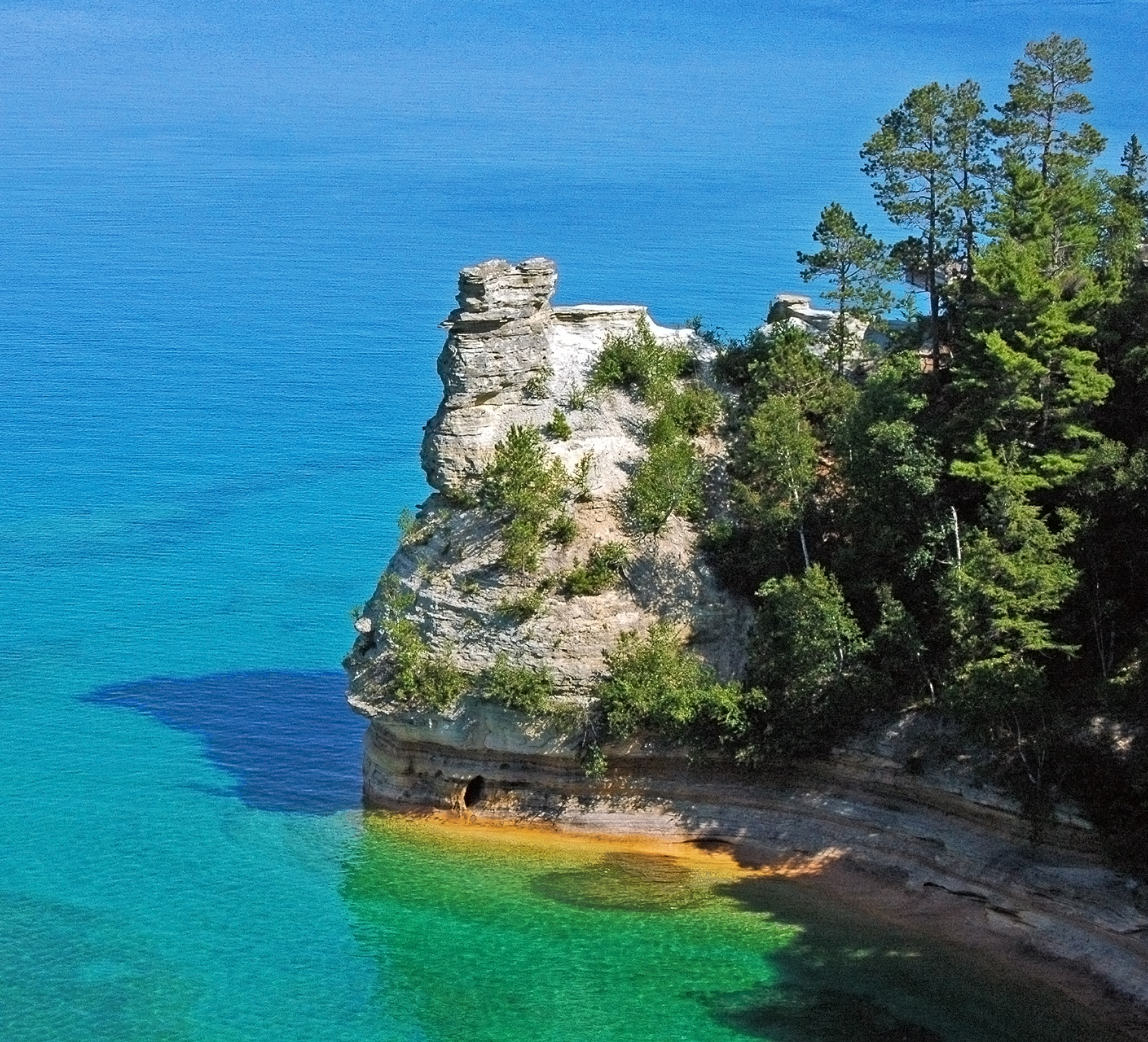
Miners' Castle after one turret collapsed in April 2006

Although the Pictured Rocks shore waters are a rich fishing ground, the sandstone cliffs are dangerous to canoes and other open boats skirting the coastline. In 1658, the fur trader Pierre Esprit Radisson made this risky passage and noted that his Native American companions made an offering of tobacco to the local spirit of the cliffs.

During the Romantic Era of the 1800s, a series of American writers described their feelings upon sight of the Pictured Rocks. Geologist and US Indian Agent Henry Rowe Schoolcraft visited in 1820 and remarked upon "some of the most sublime and commanding views in nature". In 1850, George Copway Kah-Ge-Ga-Gah-Bow, a Mississaugas Ojibwe writer and Methodist missionary, published The Traditional History and Characteristic Sketches of the Ojibway Nation, in which he cited the detailed description of the Pictured Rock by General Lewis Cass. Around 1850, developers planned a tourist resort, Grand Island City, adjacent to the Pictured Rocks near the current site of Munising.

After the lumbering era ended around 1910, much of the land making up the current National Lakeshore reverted to the state of Michigan for unpaid property taxes. Eager for federal help and recognition, the state cooperated with the federal government in the region's redevelopment. In October 1966, Congress passed a bill authorizing the establishment of the Pictured Rocks National Lakeshore " to preserve for the benefit, inspiration, education, recreational use, and enjoyment of the public, a significant portion of the diminishing shoreline of the United States and its related geographic and scientific features." This was America's first National Lakeshore.

On April 13, 2006, one of the named rock formations collapsed: the Inner Turret of Miner's Castle in the Munising Formation. The collapse was reported via cell phone by fishermen in the area, according to chief ranger Larry Hach. Miners Castle consists of crumbly cross-bedded sandstone poorly cemented by secondary quartz, according to Research Ecologist Walter Loope of the U.S. Geological Survey. Rockfalls along the cliffs typically occur in the spring and fall due to freezing-thawing action.

On March 30, 2009, the Omnibus Public Land Management Act was signed into law, protecting 11,740 acres (47.5 km^{2}) of Pictured Rocks as the Beaver Basin Wilderness, spanning the 13 miles of shoreline.

In 2010, singer Kid Rock filmed the video for his song "Born Free" at the Pictured Rocks National Lakeshore.

In early 2014, Courtney Kotewa's snapshot of kayakers passing under a rock arch at the Pictured Rocks National Lakeshore was chosen as the grand prize winner of the 2013 Share the Experience photo contest, sponsored by the National Park Foundation.

== Geography ==
Points of interest in the national lakeshore include Munising Falls, Miners River, Beaver Basin Wilderness, the Au Sable Light, Grand Sable Dunes, Grand Sable Lake, and Sable Falls.

=== Access ===
Vehicular access to much of the park is seasonal. Only the road to the visitor center is plowed. All other park roads are closed from December to March, and County Road H-28 is only partially plowed. Snowmobiles are permitted into the interior of the park year round. Munising, on the western end of the lakeshore, is accessed by M-28 and M-94. Grand Marais, on the eastern end, is reached by M-77.

Paved highways penetrate the Lakeshore from both ends, connected by County Road H-58. Roads come close to the shoreline only near Miners Castle, 12 Mile Beach, and the Grand Sable Dunes. The rest of the shoreline is seen from land only by hiking. A 42-mile (67-km) section of the North Country Trail spans the lakeshore. A permit is needed for backcountry camping, which is allowed along many miles of the National Lakeshore. This means that dispersed camping is not allowed in the park.

Many boat companies offer daily trips along the lakeshore from Memorial Day weekend through the fall season. Sea kayaking is another popular way to explore the park. While this may be the best way to see the natural formations, it is a strenuous trip in cold, dangerous water, not to be undertaken lightly or without proper equipment. Guides are available. The most efficient port of entry for kayaks is from Miner's Beach or the harbor at Munising. In addition, pontoons can be cheaply rented locally.

The administrators of Pictured Rocks have worked to make much of its rugged environment wheelchair accessible.

=== Waterfalls ===
Pictured Rocks is the site of many of Michigan's waterfalls. Most of the waterfalls resulted from water running over the cliffs of the Munising Formation. This lime and sandstone formation exists between Tahquamenon Falls, some 75 miles (121 km) east, to Laughing Whitefish Falls, 30 miles (48 km) west of the Lakeshore. Pets are not allowed on most of the trails.

- Munising Falls is a 50-foot (15 m) waterfall over a sandstone cliff. Along the trail may be seen ferns, wildflowers, and an occasional mink. The trail is fully accessible to people with disabilities and dogs are allowed.
- Miners Falls is located at the end of a self-guiding interpretive trail that passes Miners Basin. There are 77 steps leading down to the viewing platform. The falls drops 50 feet (15 m) over the sandstone outcrop.
- Bridalveil Falls is a seasonal waterfall. In the summer, it may not exist or be only a trickle.
- Mosquito Falls drops over an 8-foot (2.4 m) rock shelf on the Mosquito River. River otters and beavers live in the stream along the trail.
- Chapel Falls Chapel Falls cascades some 60 feet (18 m) down the sandstone cliffs on its way to Chapel Lake.
- Spray Falls is best seen from Lake Superior. The 1856 shipwreck of the Superior is at the base of the falls in 20 feet (6.1 m) of water.
- Sable Falls tumbles 75 feet (23 m) over several cliffs of Munising and Jacobsville sandstone formations on its way to Lake Superior.
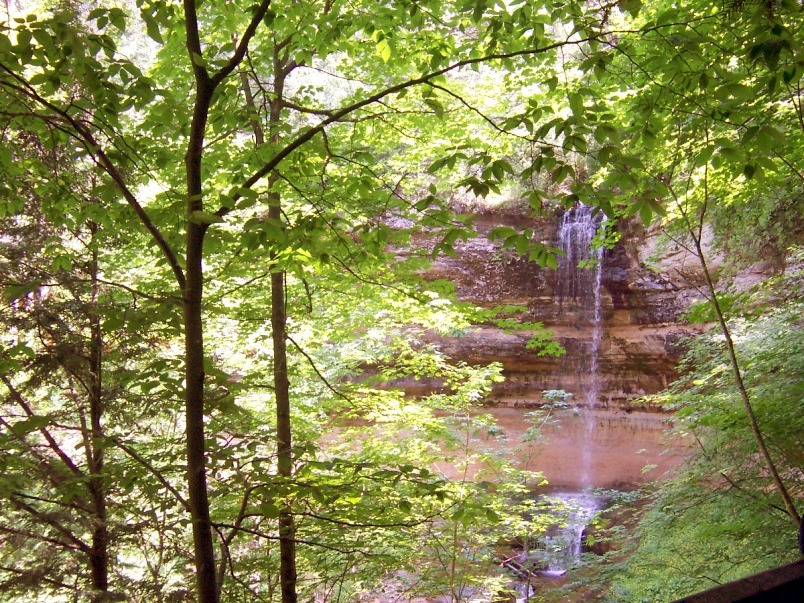
Munising Falls

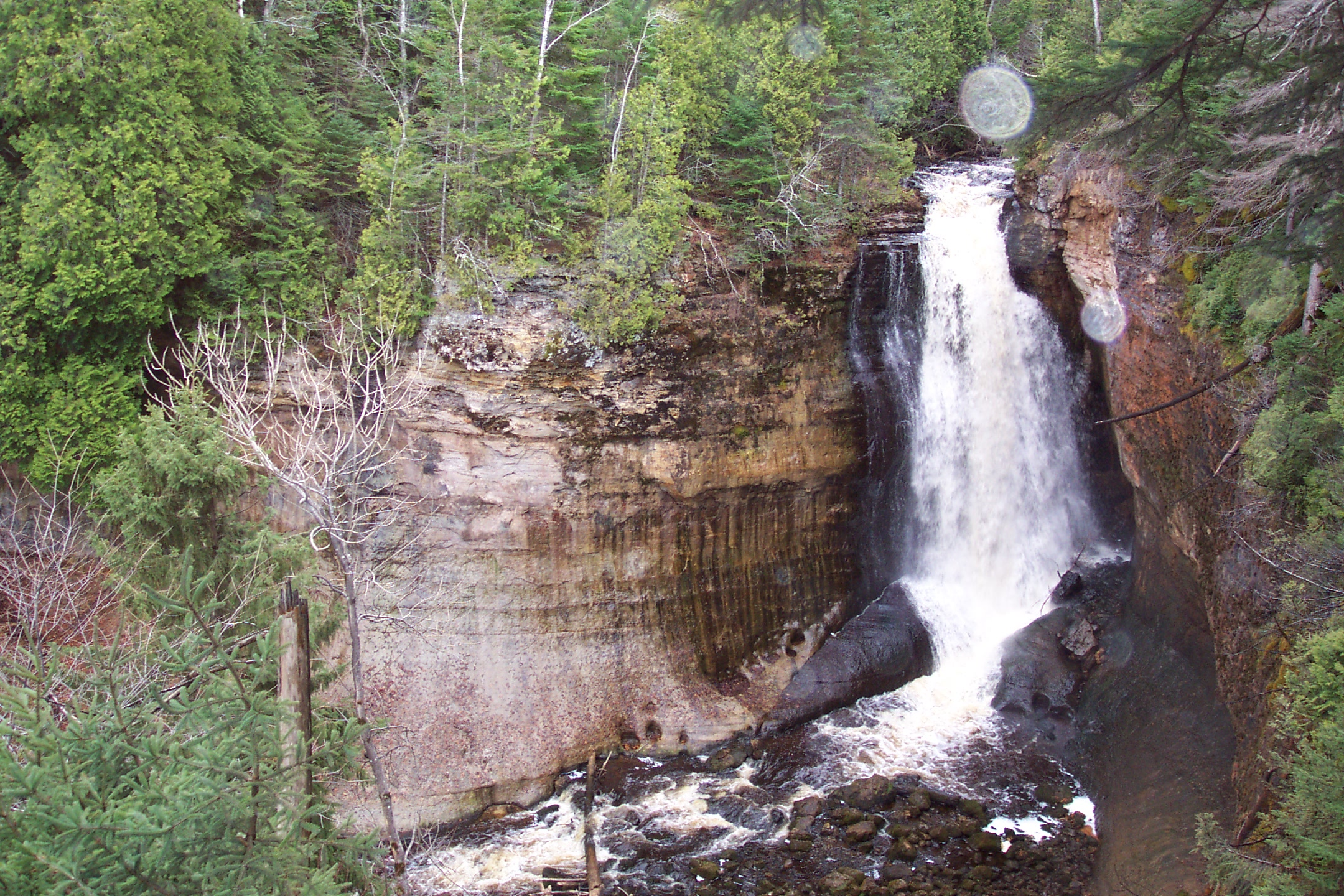
Miners Falls

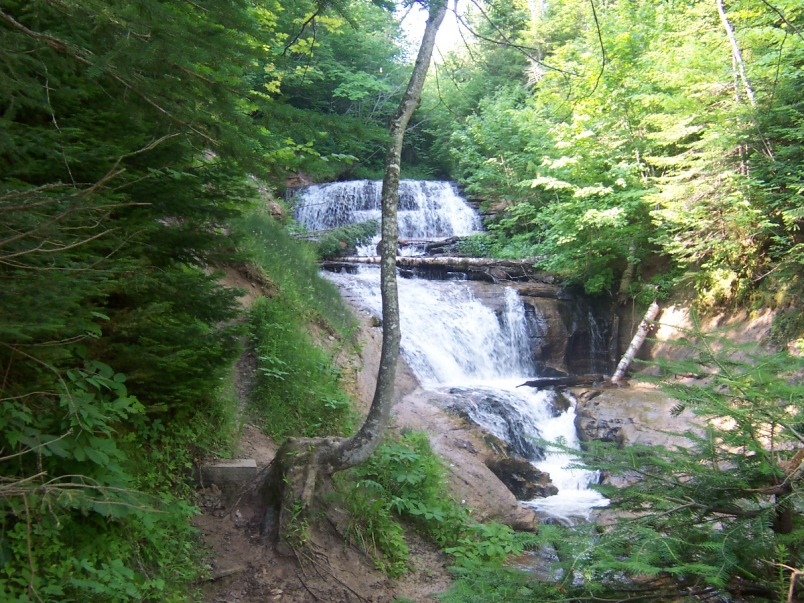
Sable Falls

=== Grand Sable Dunes ===
The Grand Sable Dunes, at the eastern end of the Lakeshore, are a perched dune formation. Sand washed ashore by wave action was then blown upslope by northerly prevailing winds until it came to rest atop a glacial moraine. The Grand Sable Dunes today form a five-mile-long sand slope that rises from Lake Superior at a 35° angle. The summits of the tallest dunes are as high as 275 feet (85 m) above lake level.

Glacial melt during the last major advance/retreat called the Marquette Readvance created the conditions for the formation of the Grand Sable Banks. Dominant northwesterly winds eventually caused blowing sand to become perched on the banks. Today, the Grand Sable Banks rise to heights of up to 300 ft. at a 35-degree angle from the shore of Lake Superior. The Grand Sable Dunes perched on top of these banks offers a desolate sandscape with jack pine forest near the edges.

In the late 19th century, loggers in the area built a wooden log slide from the top of the dunes at the Grand Sable Banks to Lake Superior below to facilitate the transportation of timber from the area. The location is a popular spot to view the Grand Banks and climb on the dunes. Visitors may also take a trail from the Grand Sable Visitors Center near the eastern end of the dunes or stop along a section of the dunes that border on Grand Sable Lake.

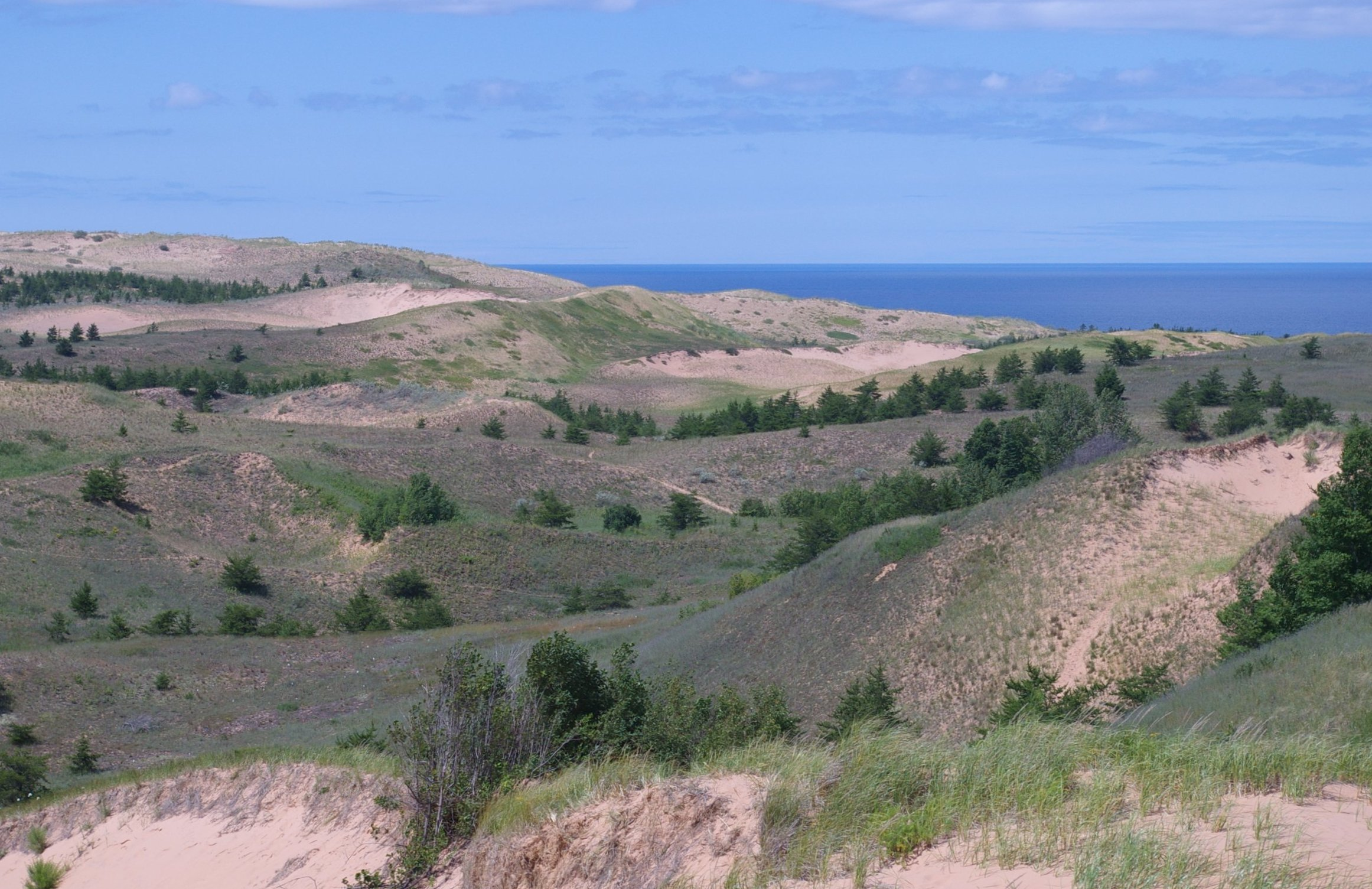
View of the dunes with Lake Superior in the background

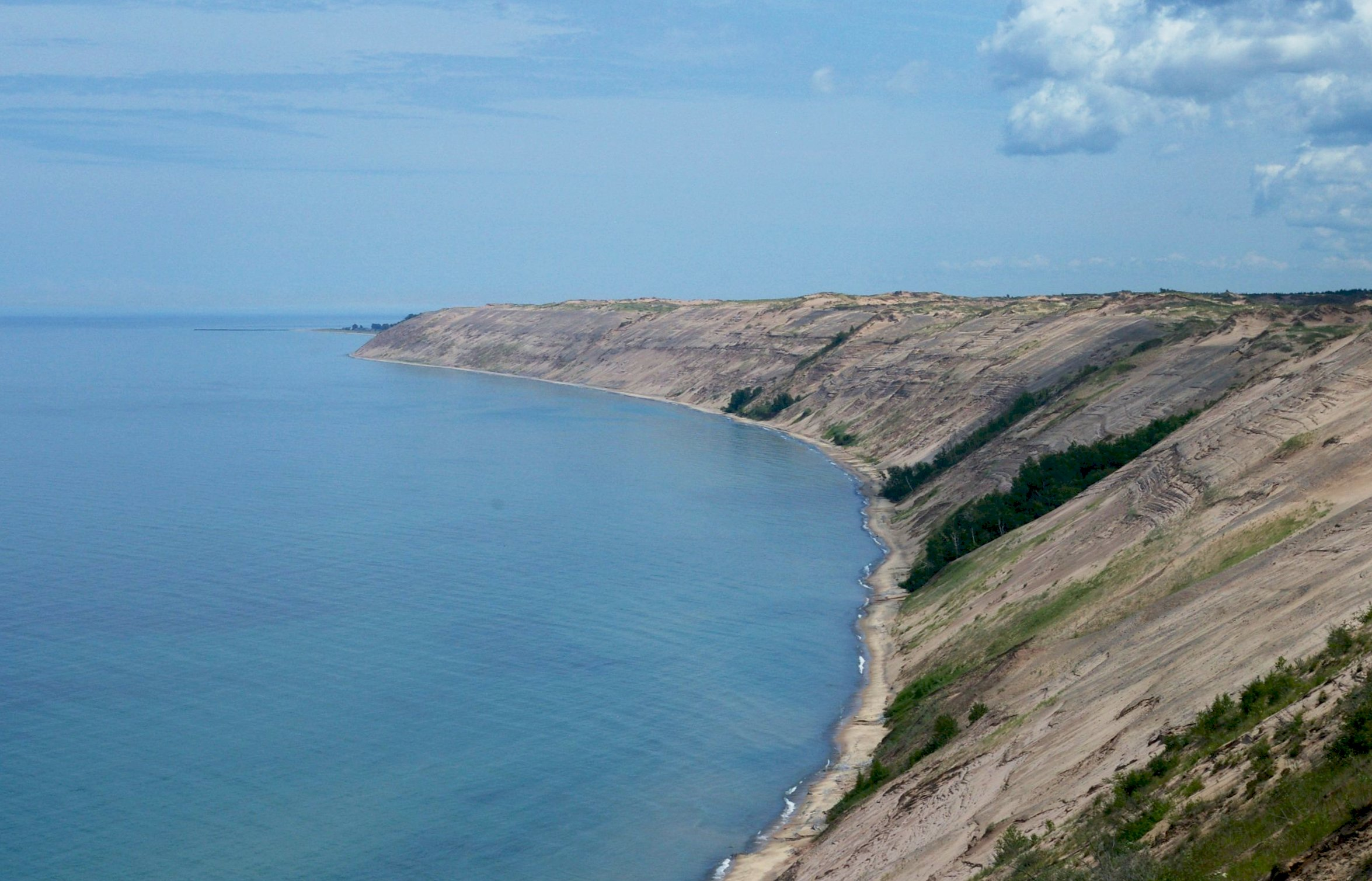
A view of the Grand Sable Banks looking east from the logslide location

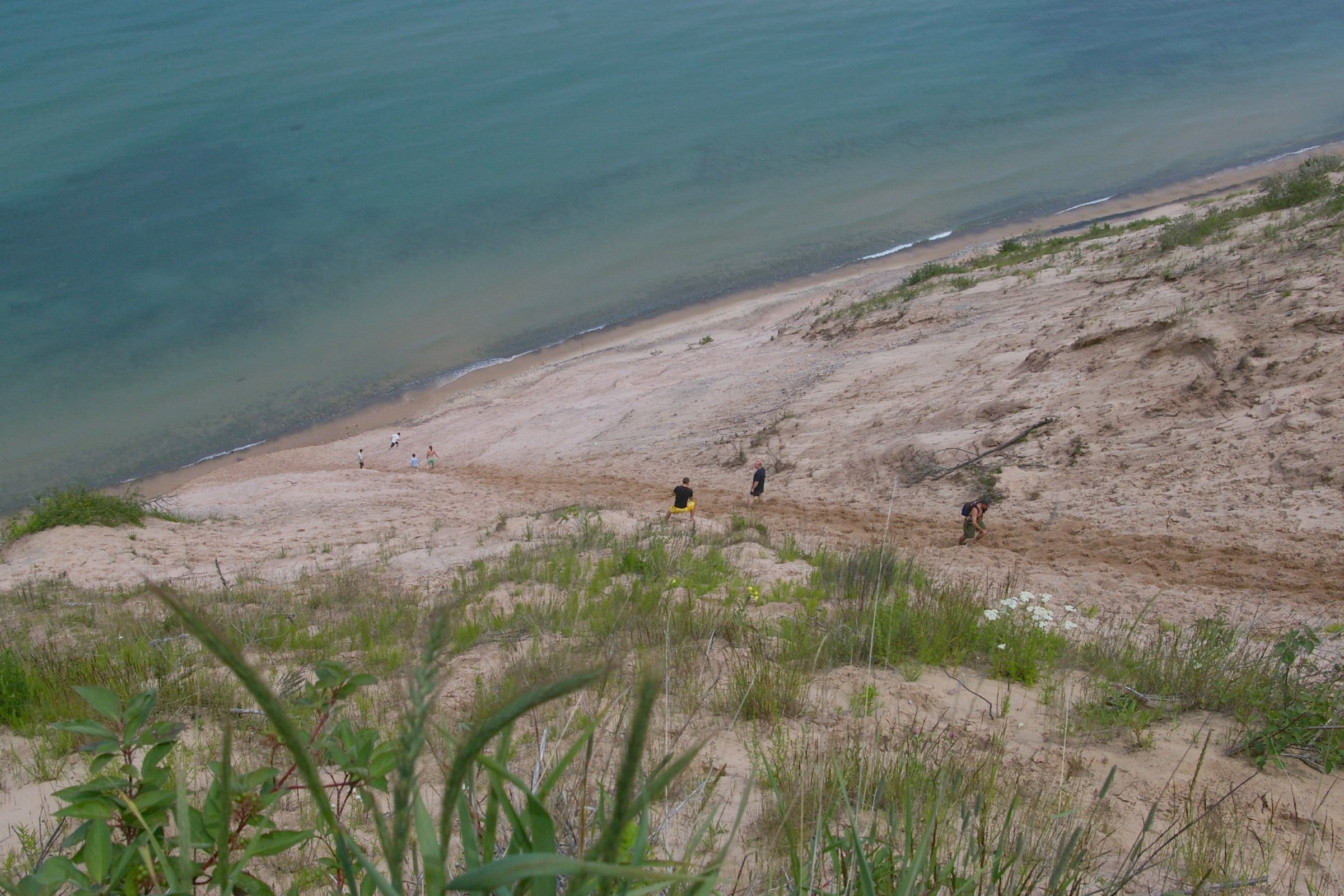
A view of the former logslide site from the top of the banks

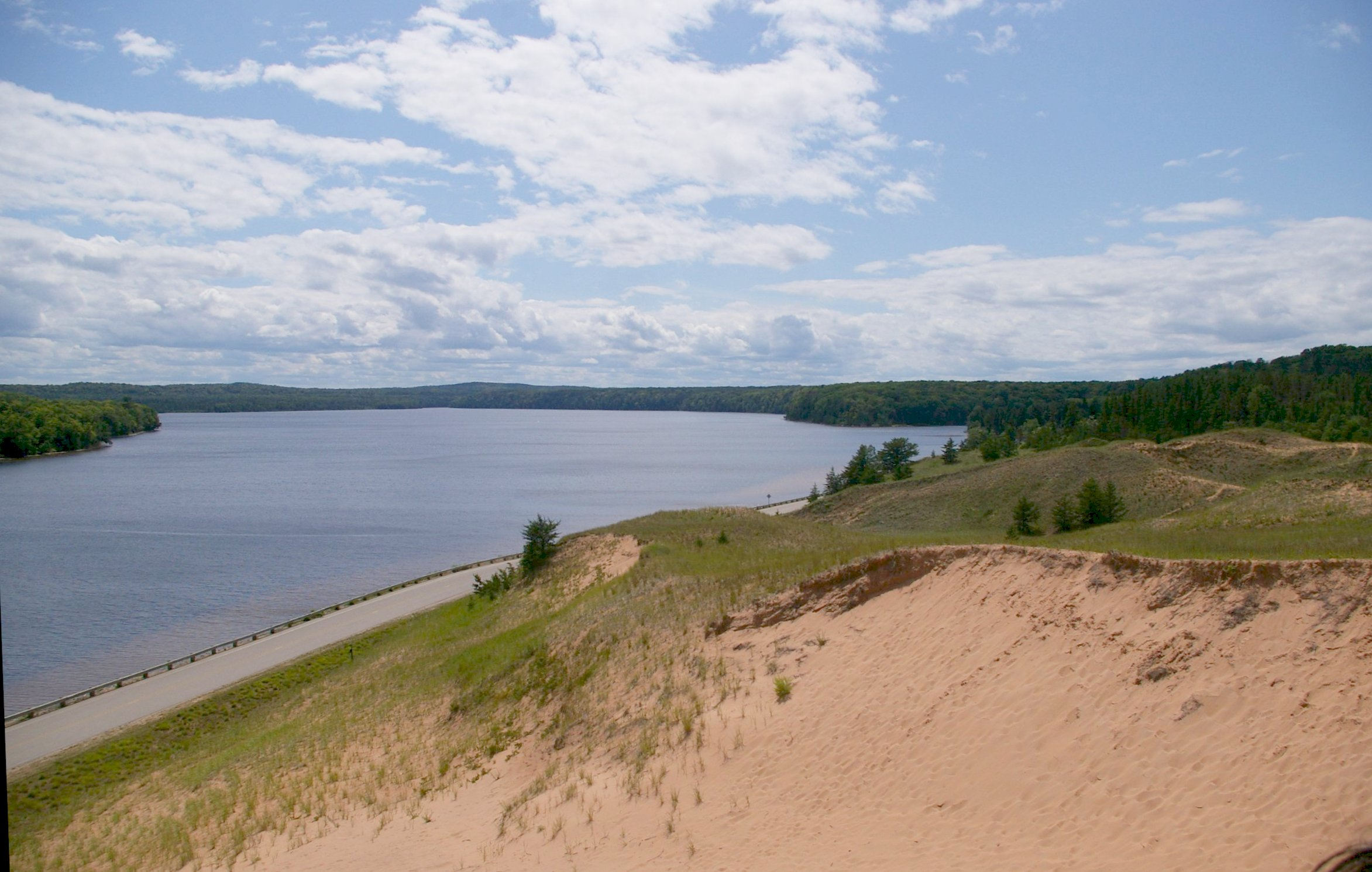
A view of the dunes overlooking Grand Sable Lake

== Geology ==
The colors in the cliffs are created by the large amounts of minerals in the rock. The cliffs are composed of the Munising Formation of 500-million-year-old Cambrian Period sandstone. The Munising Formation sits atop Precambrian sandstone of the Jacobsville Formation. The mottled red Jacobsville Formation is the oldest rock in the park. On top of the Munising Formation, acting as a cap over the other layers is the hard sandstone of the younger Au Train Formation from the Ordovician Period. Streaks on the face of the cliffs come from groundwater leaching out of the rock and evaporating, leaving streaks of iron (red), manganese (black-white), limonite (yellow-brown), copper (pink-green), and other minerals.

== Climate and weather ==
Climate data for Grand Marais, Michigan
Month	Jan	Feb	Mar	Apr	May	Jun	Jul	Aug	Sep	Oct	Nov	Dec	Year
Mean daily maximum °F	25.3	27.4	36.4	49.2	62.1	70.4	75.9	74.8	67	55.8	41.5	29.7	51.3
Mean daily minimum °F	11.2	10.6	17.9	29.3	37.9	45.7	51.9	52.8	47.1	38	28.2	17	32.3
Average rainfall inches	2.3	1.4	1.6	1.6	2.5	2.9	2.5	3.2	3.6	3	2.6	2.5	29.8
Average snowfall inches	47.3	30.7	16	4.8	0.3	0.0	0.0	0.0	0.0	0.9	12.6	41.7	154.2
Mean daily maximum °C	−3.7	−2.6	2.4	9.6	16.7	21.3	24.4	23.8	19	13.2	5.3	−1.3	10.7
Mean daily minimum °C	−11.6	−11.9	−7.8	−1.5	3.3	7.6	11.1	11.6	8.4	3	−2.1	−8	0.2
Average rainfall mm	58	36	41	41	64	74	64	81	91	76	66	64	760
Average snowfall cm	120	78	41	12	0.76	0.0	0.0	0.0	0.0	2.3	32	106	392

Pictured Rocks National Lakeshore

Climate chart (precipitation, max. and min. temperature)
J	F	M	A	M	J	J	A	S	O	N	D
58 −4 −12	36 −3 −12	41 2 −8	41 10 −2	64 17 3	74 21 8	64 24 11	81 24 12	91 19 8	76 13 3	66 5 −2	64 −1 −8
- █ Average max. and min. temperatures in °C
- █ Precipitation totals in mm
Imperial conversion
J	F	M	A	M	J	J	A	S	O	N	D
2.3 25 11	1.4 27 11	1.6 36 18	1.6 49 29	2.5 62 38	2.9 70 46	2.5 76 52	3.2 75 53	3.6 66 47	3 56 37	2.6 42 28	2.5 30 18
- █ Average max. and min. temperatures in °F
- █ Precipitation totals in inches

== Recreation ==
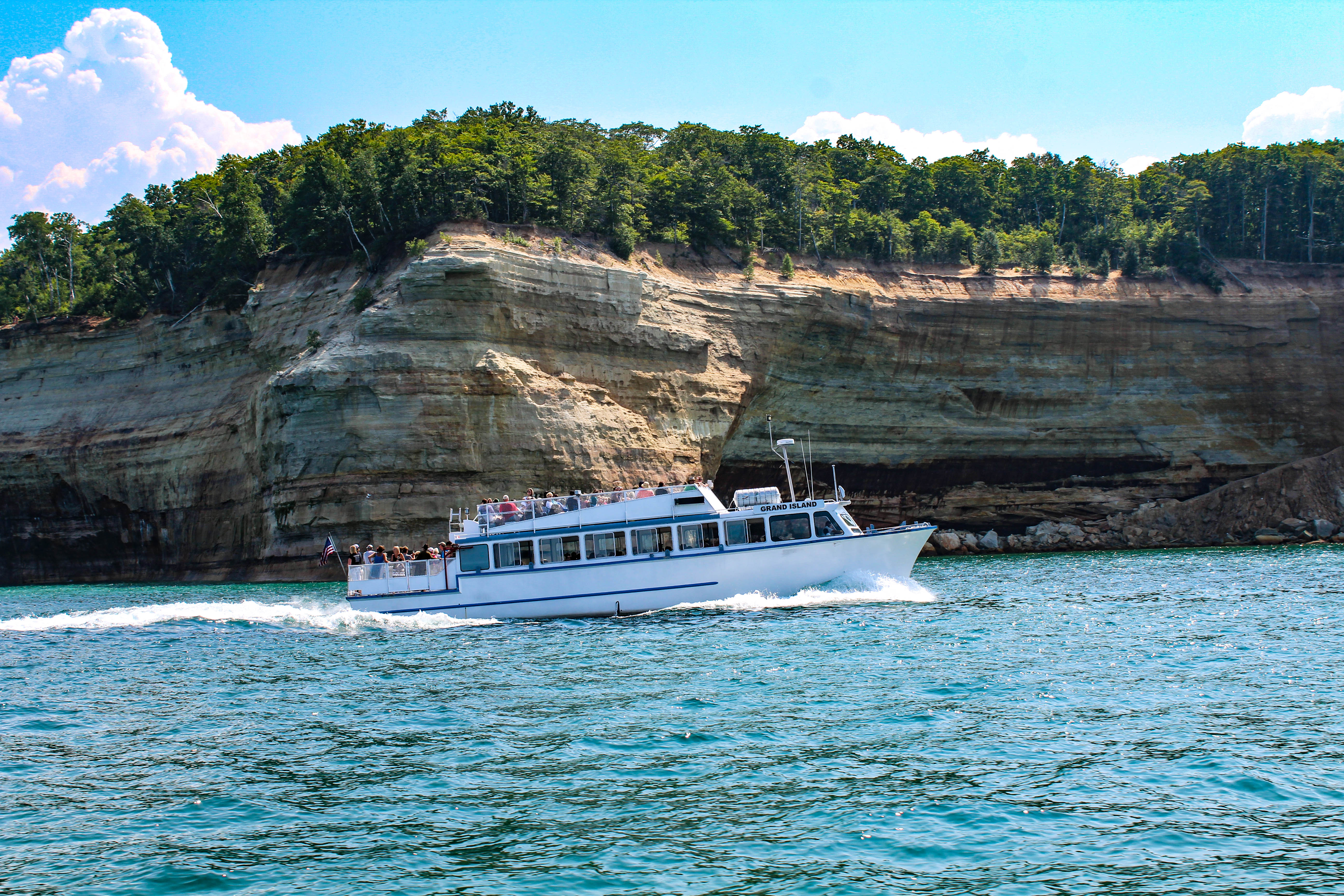
A tour boat at Pictured Rocks

Pictured Rocks National Lakeshore offers a variety of recreational opportunities for visitors year-round, including hiking, back-country camping, kayaking, boating, swimming, scuba diving, fishing, and winter activities including snowmobiling, ice climbing, and cross-country skiing. The scenery and park activities make the park popular, with a record 800,000 visitors in 2018.

The colored rock formations attract kayakers and boat tours during the summer, as visitors flock to see the varied rock formations and colored rocks. Due to the danger of kayaking on the water near the cliffs, specialized equipment for sea-kayaking and knowledge are required to safely paddle near the cliffs.

Pictured Rocks National Lakeshore is a popular scuba diving destination in the Midwest and country, as the turbulent waters of Lake Superior have created many shipwrecks to explore over the years. A popular destination is the Alger Underwater Preserve.

Due to the lake-effect snow, Pictured Rocks and the Munising area have some of the highest snowfall levels across the country. This snowfall creates an ideal environment for snowmobilers, with dedicated snowmobile and cross-country ski trails being available in the park. Additionally, the long winter and constant runoff from snowmelt create a similarly ideal environment for ice-climbing, with over 50 named ice formations. Ice climbing in Michigan attracts climbers from across the Midwest, the country, and even internationally. Additionally, the ice formations attract visitors for sightseeing.

== Gallery ==
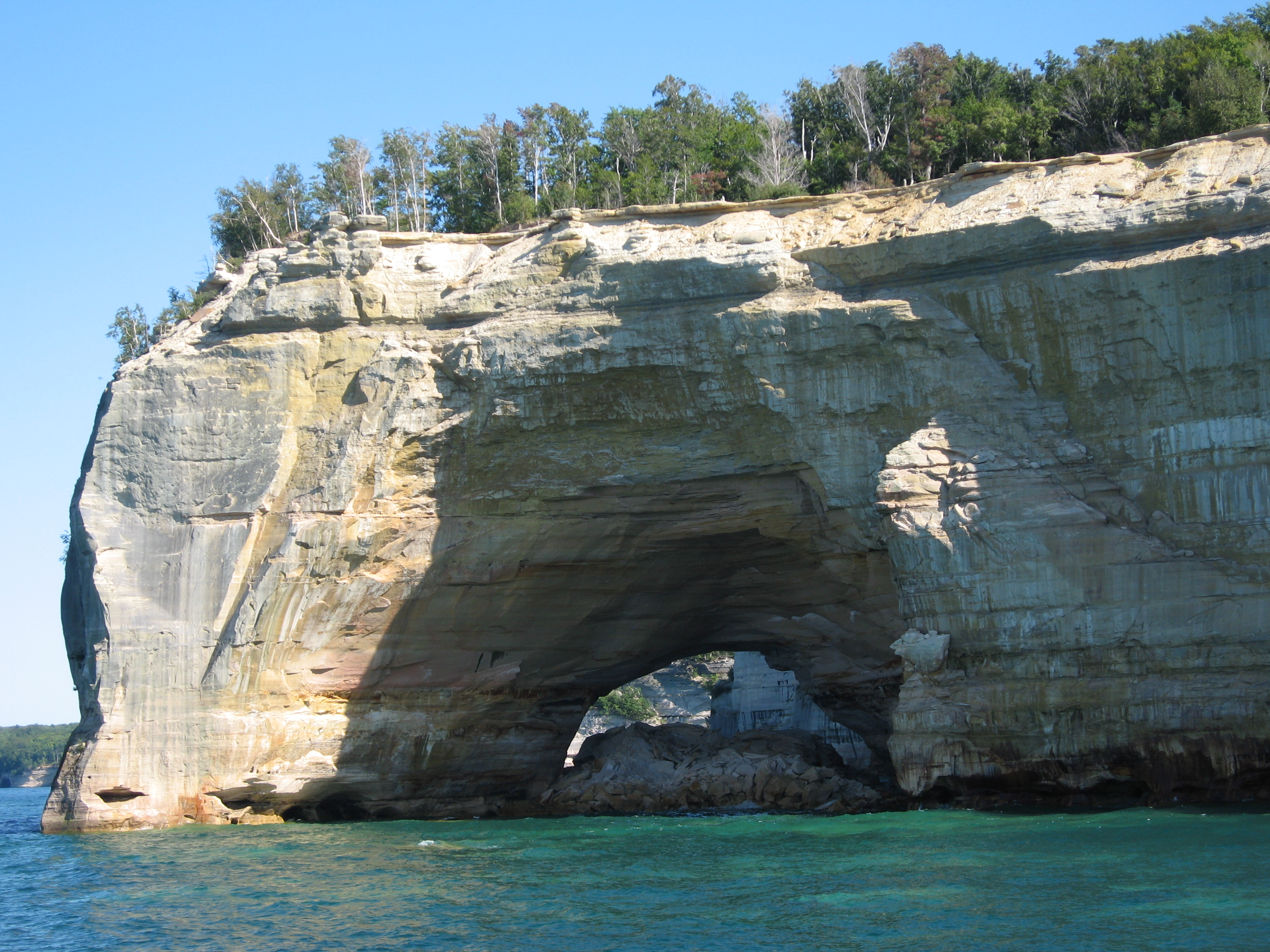
Rock arches and sea caves are popular with kayakers

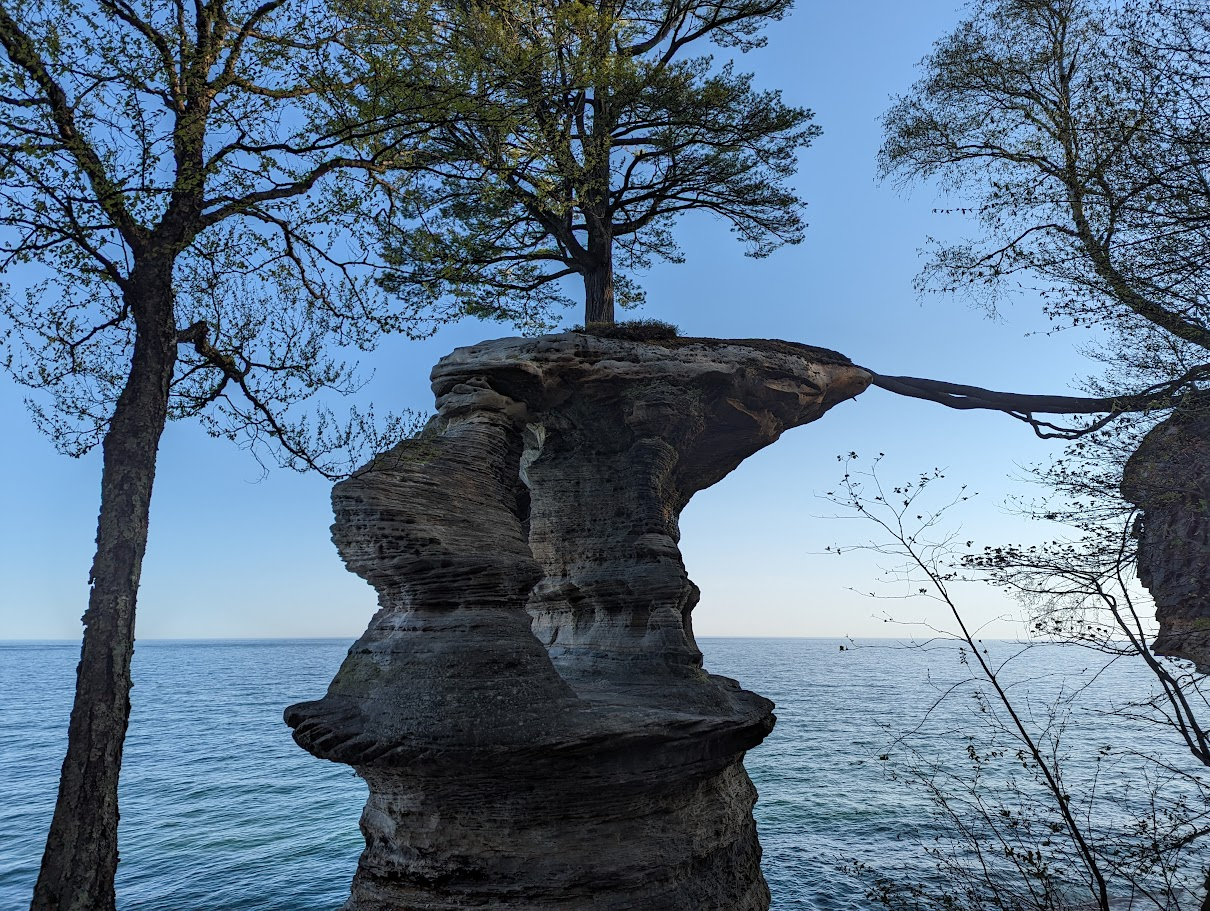
Photo of Chapel Rock at dawn from the shore, looking over Lake Superior

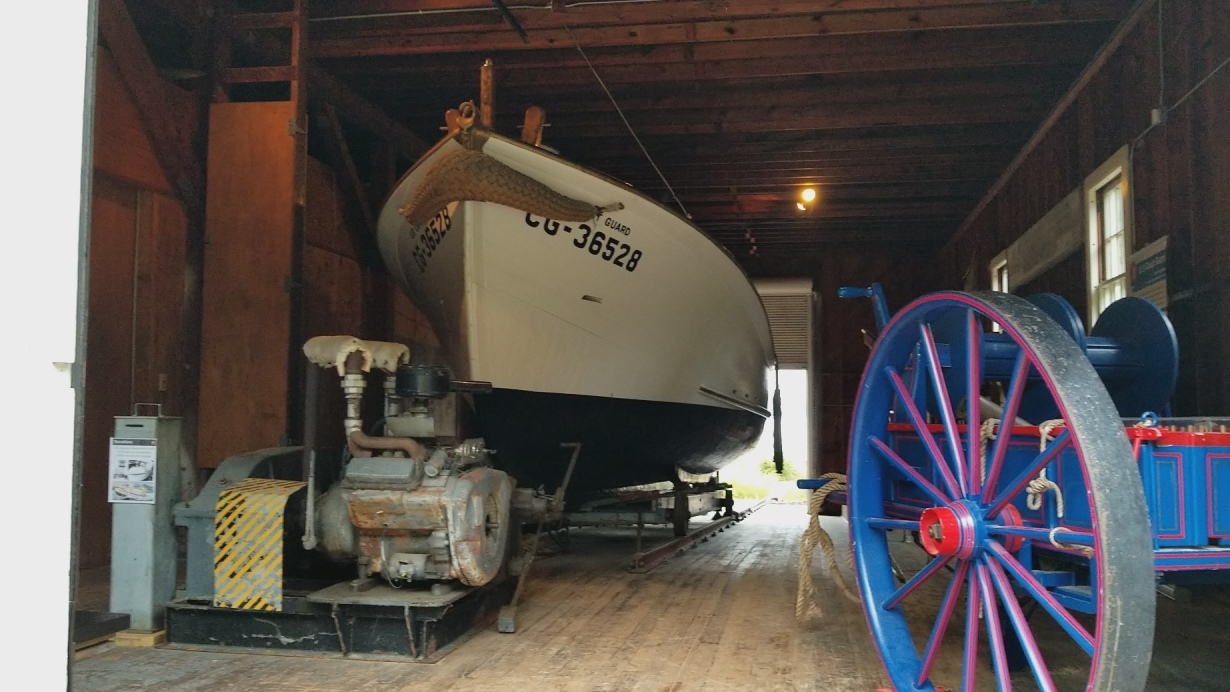
Munising Coast Guard Station

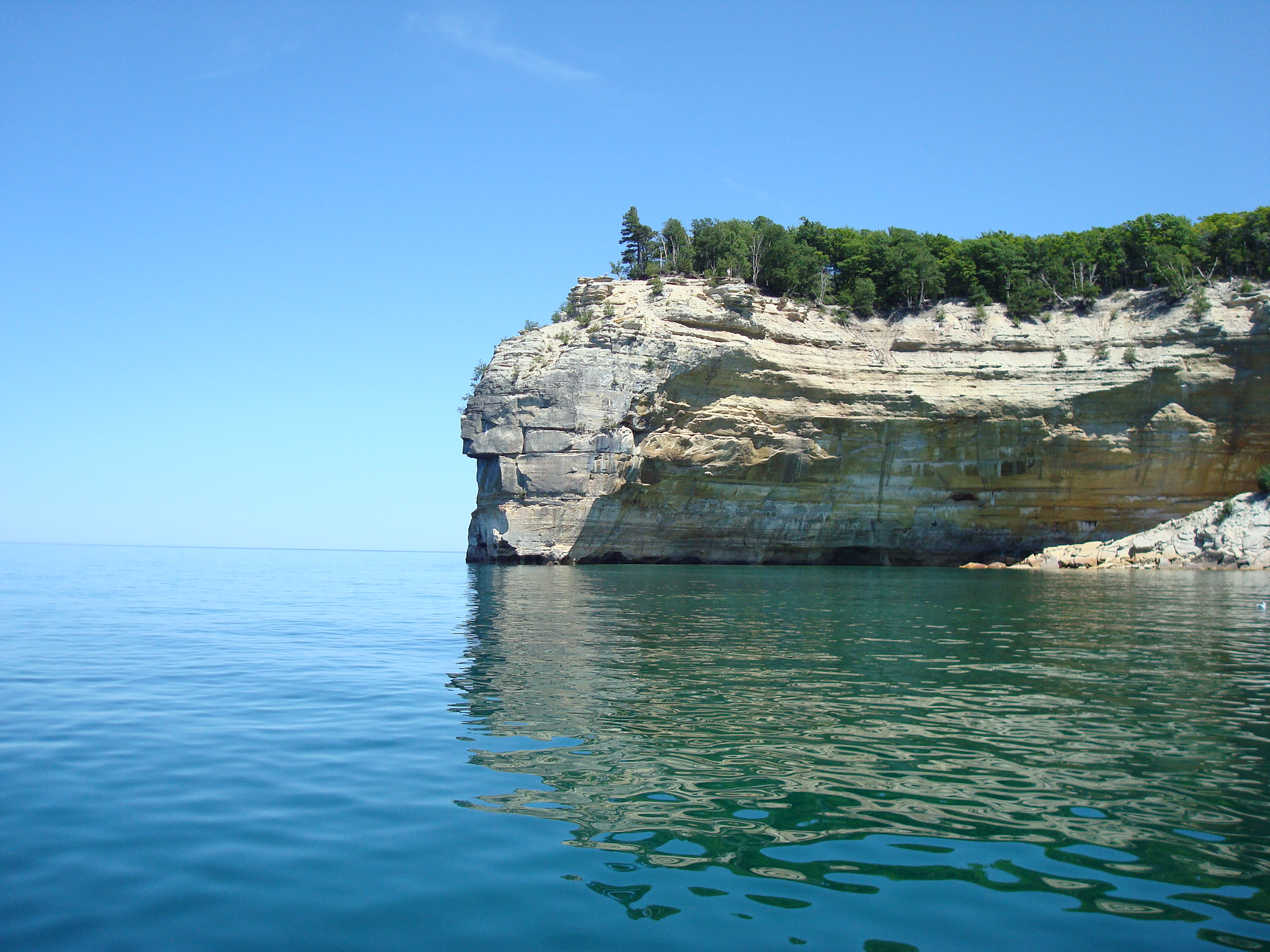
Indian Head as seen during Pictured Rocks Cruises

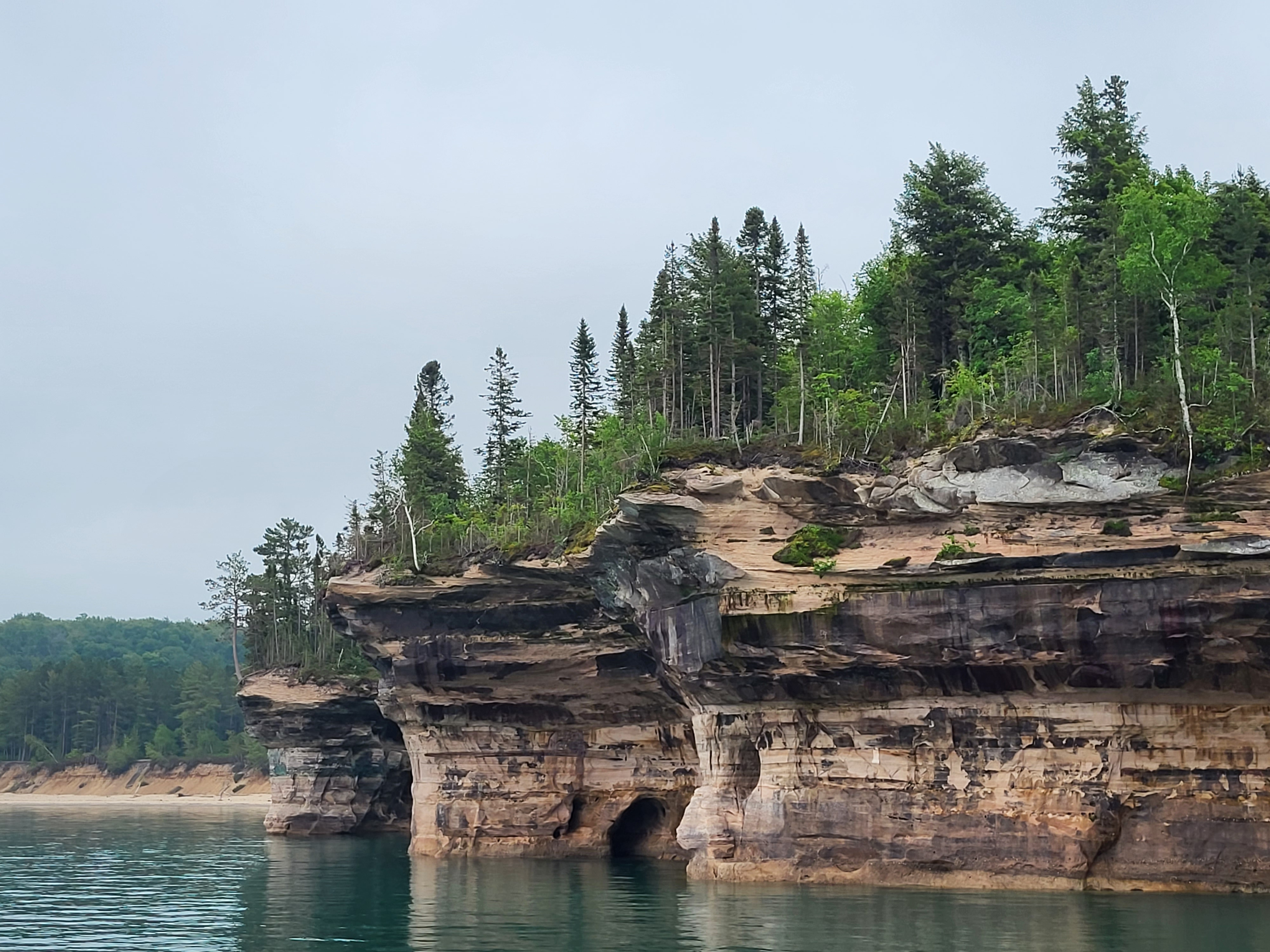
Pictured Rocks seen from the Pictured Rocks Cruises

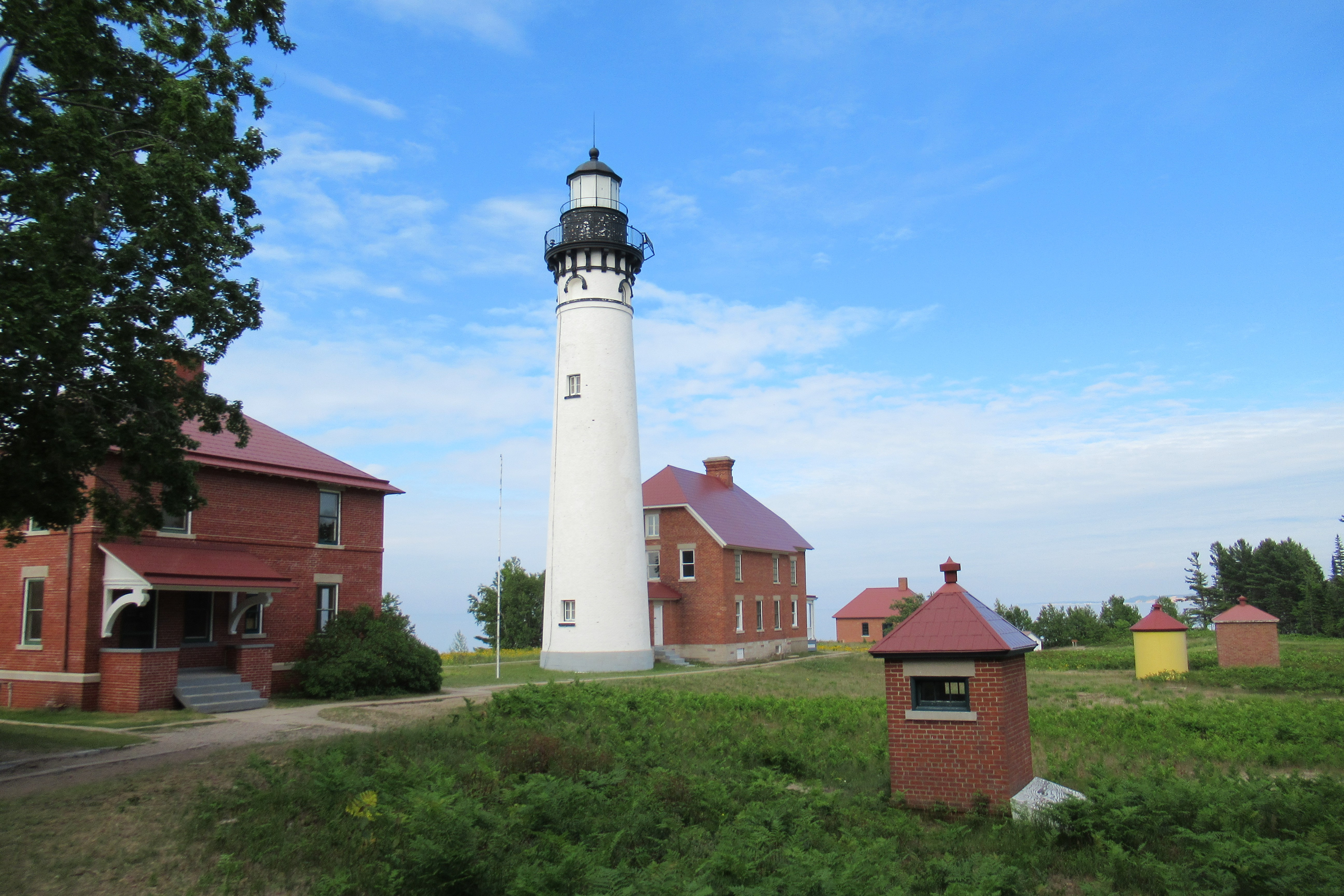
Au Sable Light, built in 1874 after numerous shipwrecks

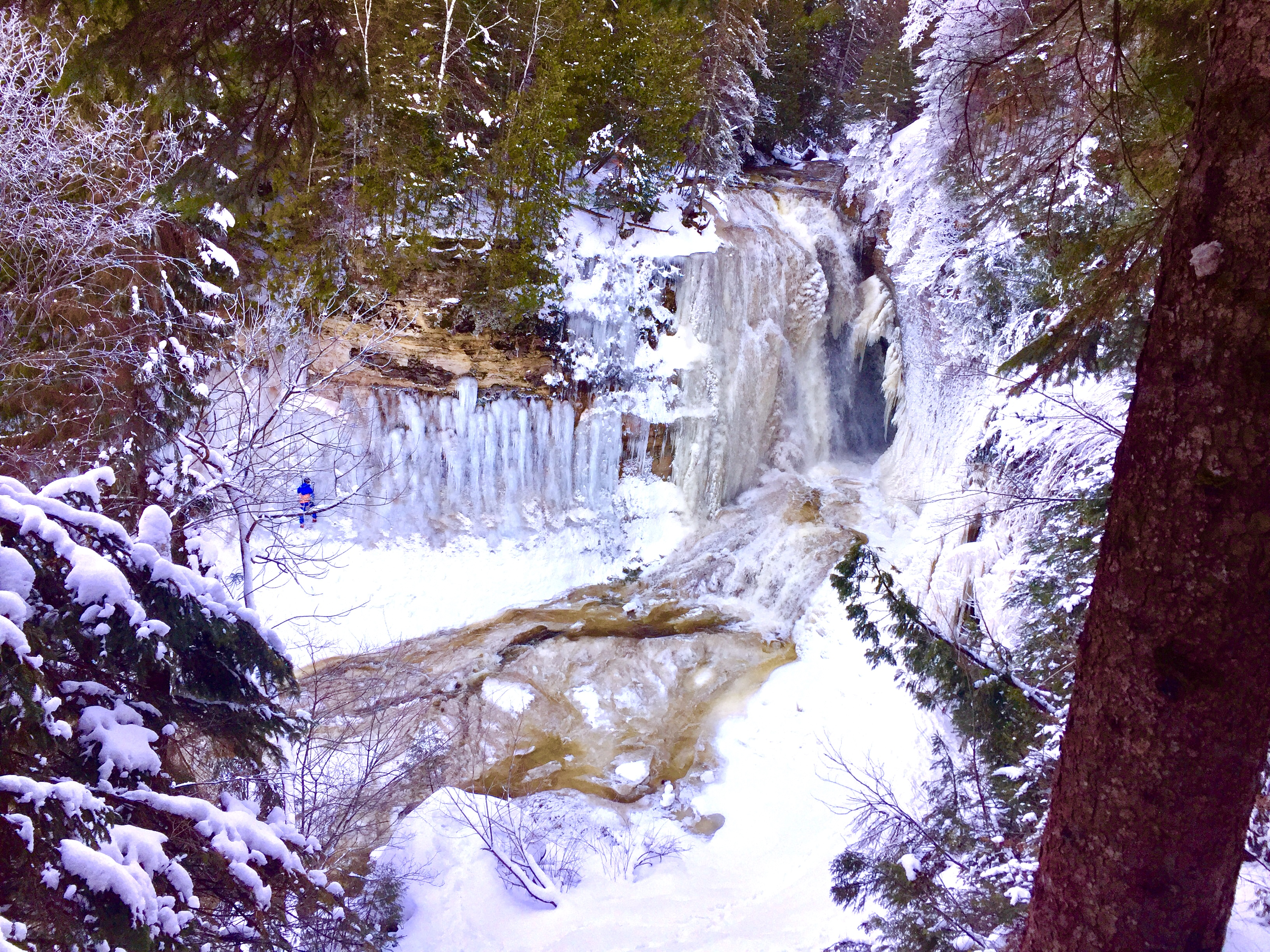
An ice climber explores ice formations near Miner's Falls, Pictured Rocks National Lakeshore

Pictured Rocks is featured on Michigan's America the Beautiful quarter.
