= Seul Choix Light =

Lighthouse in Michigan, United States

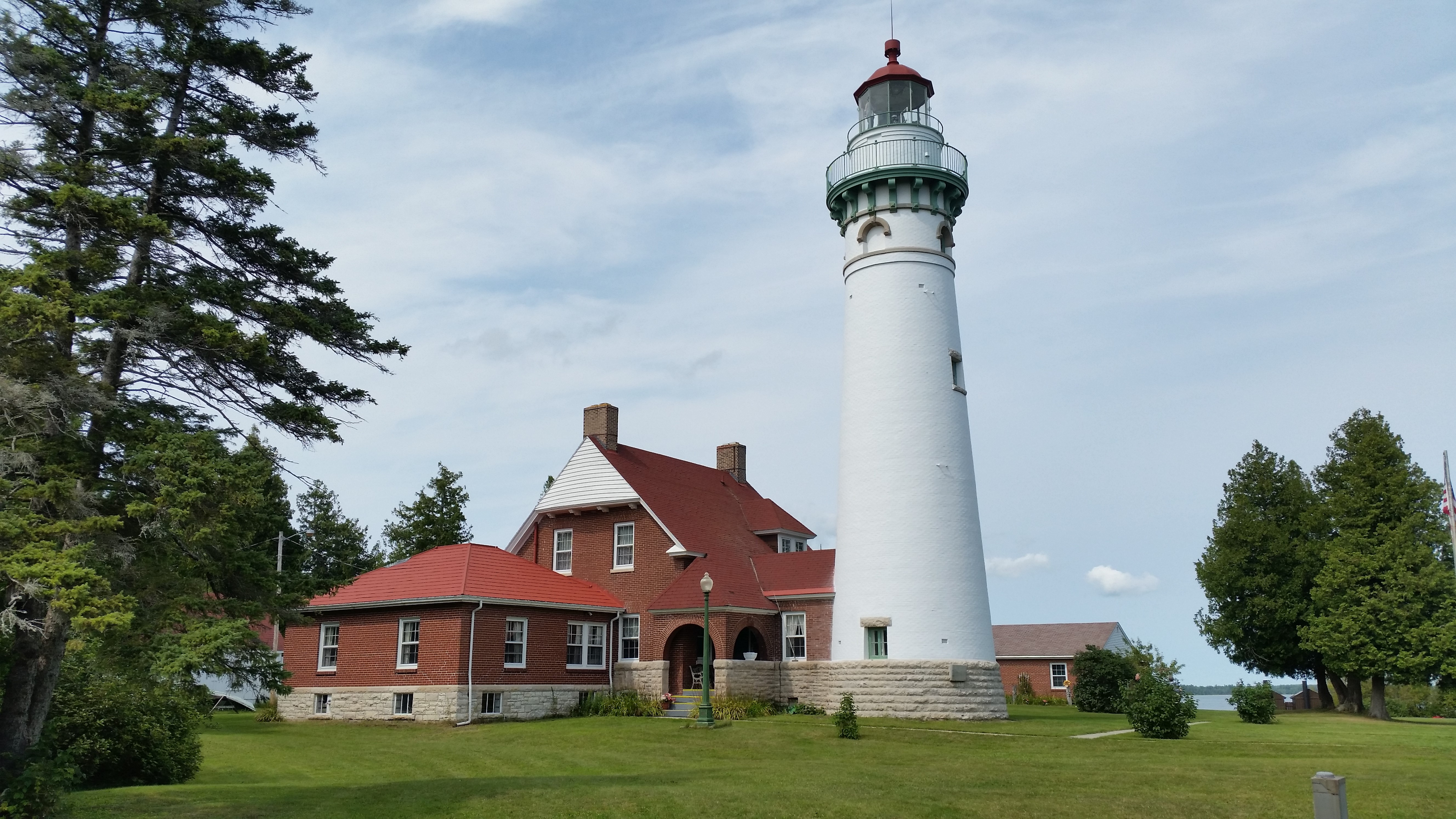
- Seul Choix Light (August 2017)
- Location: Schoolcraft County, Michigan
- Coordinates: 45°55′17″N 85°54′43″W

Tower
- Constructed: 1892
- Foundation: Ashlar stone
- Construction: Brick, Italianate bracketing
- Automated: 1972
- Height: 77 feet (23 m)
- Shape: Frustum of a cone, attached keeper's house
- Markings: White orig./White/black markings/red roofs
- Heritage: National Register of Historic Places listed place, Michigan State Historic Site
- Fog signal: Diaphone (not active, on display)

Light
- First lit: 1892
- Focal height: 80 feet (24 m)
- Lens: Third order Fresnel lens (original), Vega Industries Marine LED Beacon (current)
- Range: 16 nautical miles (30 km; 18 mi)
- Characteristic: white flash every 6 seconds
- Seul Choix Pointe Light Station
- U.S. National Register of Historic Places
- Michigan State Historic Site
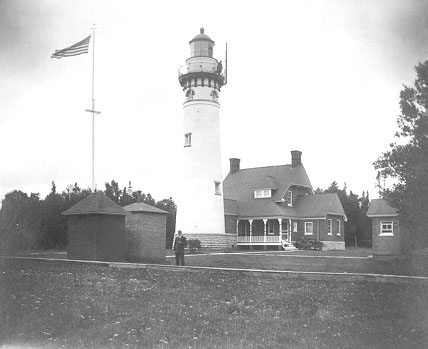
- U.S. Coast Guard photo c1915
- Nearest city: Manistique, Michigan
- Area: 2 acres (0.81 ha)
- Architect: Orlando M. Poe
- Architectural style: Italianate bracketing
- MPS: USCG Lighthouses and Light Stations on the Great Lakes TR
- NRHP reference No.: 84001846

Significant dates
- Added to NRHP: July 19, 1984
- Designated MSHS: August 21, 1987

The Seul Choix Light is a lighthouse located in the northwest corner of Lake Michigan in Schoolcraft County, Michigan. The station was established in 1892 with a temporary light, and this light started service in 1895, and was fully automated in 1972. It is an active aid to navigation. There is now a museum at the light and both the building and the grounds are open for visitors from Memorial Day until the middle of October.

== History ==
This location is the only harbor of refuge along a treacherous stretch of coast. Its French name is "only choice", suggesting that it was used as a refuge by the early French traders in this area. Local references state that the correct pronunciation is "Sis-shwa", assumed to be the common name used by both the French Voyageurs and the Native Americans with whom they traded.

In the 1880s, there was increased maritime traffic between the harbors on Lake Michigan's western shore and Green Bay on the one hand, and the Straits of Mackinac on the other. Although the St. Helena Island Light marked the western entry into the Straits, and Poverty Island Light lighted the entrance to the Bays de Noc, there were no lighthouses to aid mariners navigating a dark 100-mile (160 km) stretch of coastline on the southern shore of Michigan's Upper Peninsula. The navigation season along this shoreline often began and ended with treacherous storms. Waves would build as they traversed the lake, making the shelter a matter of life and death. Thus, mariners would seek shelter on the leeward side of points protruding into the lake along this stretch of unlighted shore.

The United States Lighthouse Board sought to mark the sheltering harbor, and provide a visual waypoint between the two existing lights. After considerable investigation and delay, the result was the building of this lighthouse. It also included a separate fog horn building, and a life-saving station. Although it was built two decades later, the design of this light is similar to the Au Sable Light which was designed by Orlando M. Poe, which also resembles the Grosse Point Light The building is designed in Italianate architecture.

The original optic was a fixed third-order Henry-LePaute Fresnel lens /freɪˈnɛl/. After its removal in 1973, it was housed in the Steamship Valley Camp Museum in Sault Ste. Marie, but is now in a private collection according to a sign in the keeper's dwelling.

When the light was automated, the original lens was removed and an aerobeacon was emplaced

The light was replaced with a DCB-224 aero beacon manufactured by the Carlisle & Finch Company. In this configuration, its characteristic is a white flash every six seconds, which is visible for a distance of 17 nautical miles (31 km; 20 mi) in clear weather conditions, like the original lens. In 1973, the Coast Guard closed the station, and left the automated light unmanned. Putting aside questions of nostalgia, aesthetics, or appreciation for the engineering of a bygone era (as exemplified by the Fresnel lens), this iteration of lighthouse illumination is itself incredibly effective, and an endangered remnant of another bygone era.

The site includes two brick oil houses, a workshop, barn, cistern in lighthouse keeper's house, converted boathouse (now a garage), a second keepers house, two outhouses, and a dock.

On July 19, 1984, the site was listed in the National Register of Historic Places, Reference #84001846 as Seul Choix Pointe Light Station (U.S. Coast Guard/Great Lakes TR). In 1987 it was also listed on the state registry.

== Current status ==
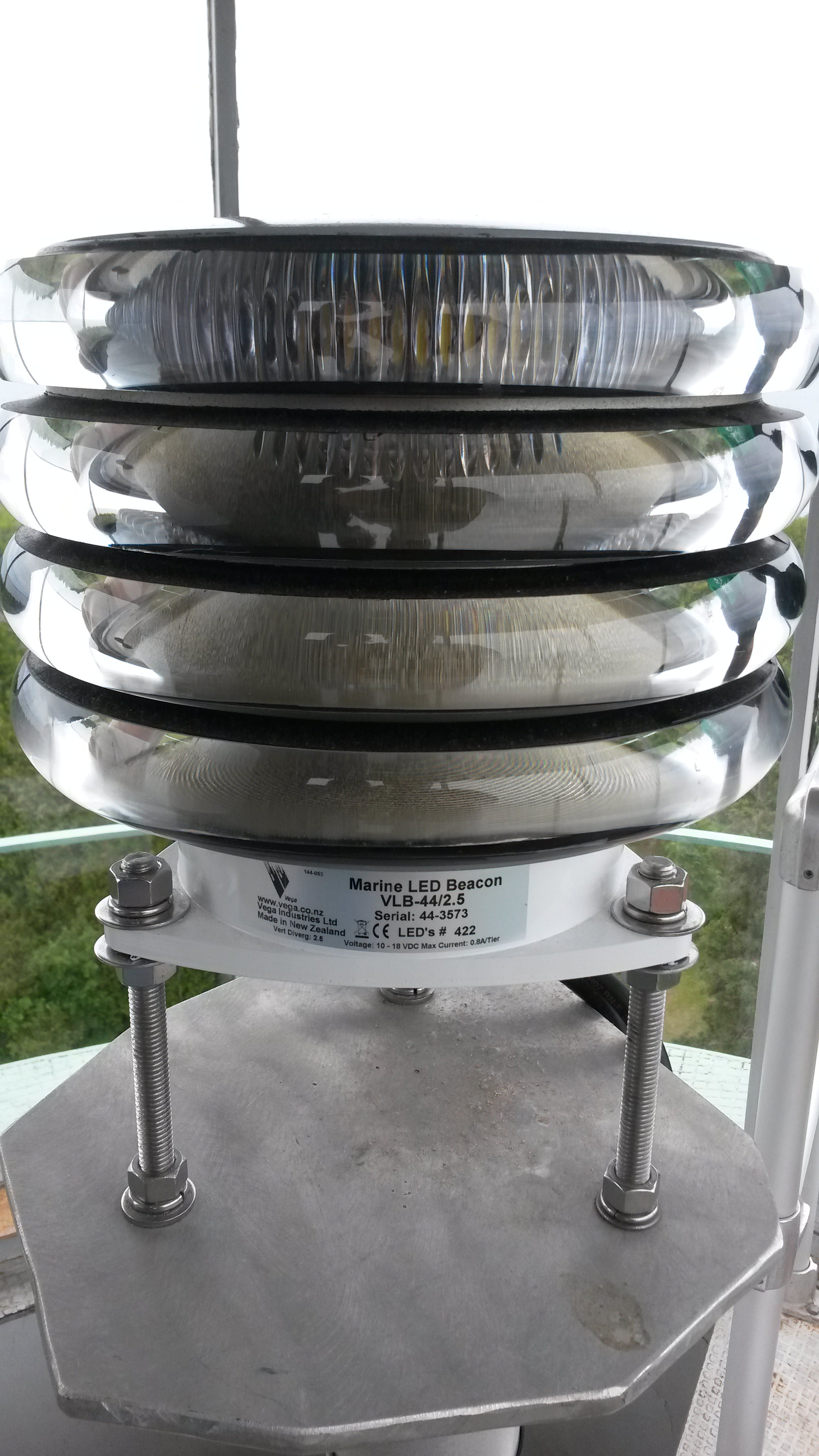
View of the current beacon taken from the lantern room July 2015

The lighthouse is operated by the Gulliver Historical Society, in cooperation with the Michigan Department of Natural Resources.

It is open to the public and tours are available (including climbing the tower), which is "relatively rare for an active aid to navigation." On display are the fog signal and a very old dugout canoe which was found on site. There are also "unique copper moldings around some of the interior door frames... a [rare] decorative touch... in lighthouse dwellings."

The lighthouse is in the end stage its historical restoration, being performed by National Restoration, Inc.

Grounds are open year-round, and the light and museum is open from Memorial Day until October 15.

It is also said to be haunted by the old lightkeeper, Joeseph William Townshed.

== Location ==
The light is located at the tip of Seul Choix Pointe on the shore of Lake Michigan in southern Mueller Township, at the end of Co. Rd. 431/John Goudreau Road southeast of Gulliver, Michigan near Port Inland, about 11 miles (18 km) east of Manistique.

== Popular culture ==
The light has been the subject of drawings and needlepoint illustrations.

Folk singer Carl Behrend recorded an album entitled The Ballad of Seul Choix Lighthouse.
