= Sable Falls =

Waterfall in Burt Township, Michigan, US

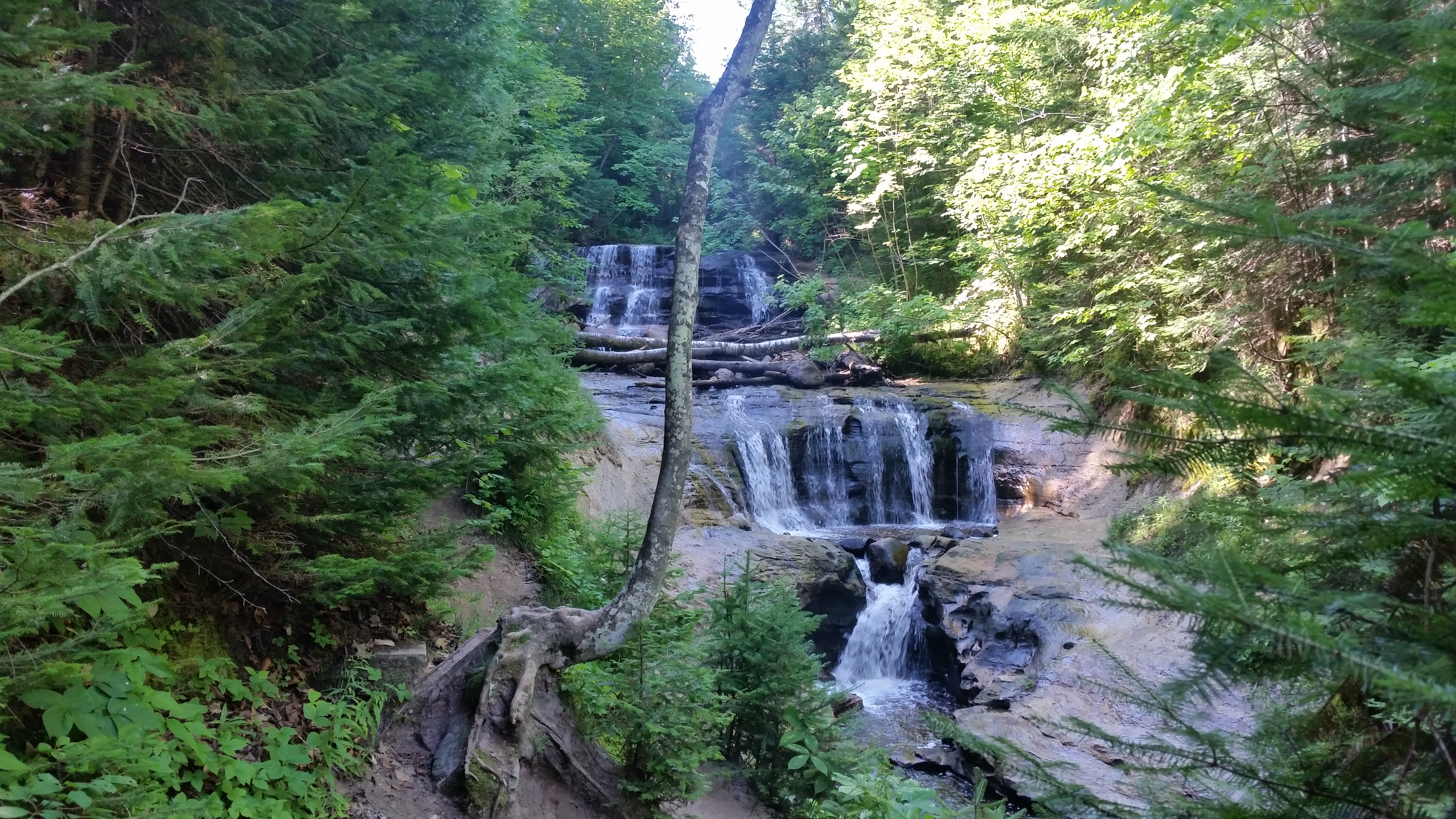
- View of Sable Falls from downstream

- Location within Michigan
- Location: Pictured Rocks National Lakeshore; Burt Township, Michigan
- Coordinates: 46°40′08″N 86°00′48″W
- Total height: 75 feet (22.9 m)
- Watercourse: Sable Creek

Sable Falls is a waterfall located on Sable Creek in the easternmost portion of the Pictured Rocks National Lakeshore in Alger County, Michigan. The main access road to the falls is H-58 west of Grand Marais, Michigan. The falls tumbles 75 feet over Munising and Jacobsville sandstone formations. The waterfall is approximately one-half mile from Lake Superior. Stairs allow for relatively easy access to the falls. Between 2007 and 2010, the park service extended the boardwalk along the falls to include a portion of Sable Creek downstream from the major (upper) falls to allow visitors to take in the minor (lower) falls and rapids downstream. There is no handicap accessibility to the site.

== See also ==
- List of waterfalls
