= Grand Sable Lake =

Lake in the state of Michigan, United States

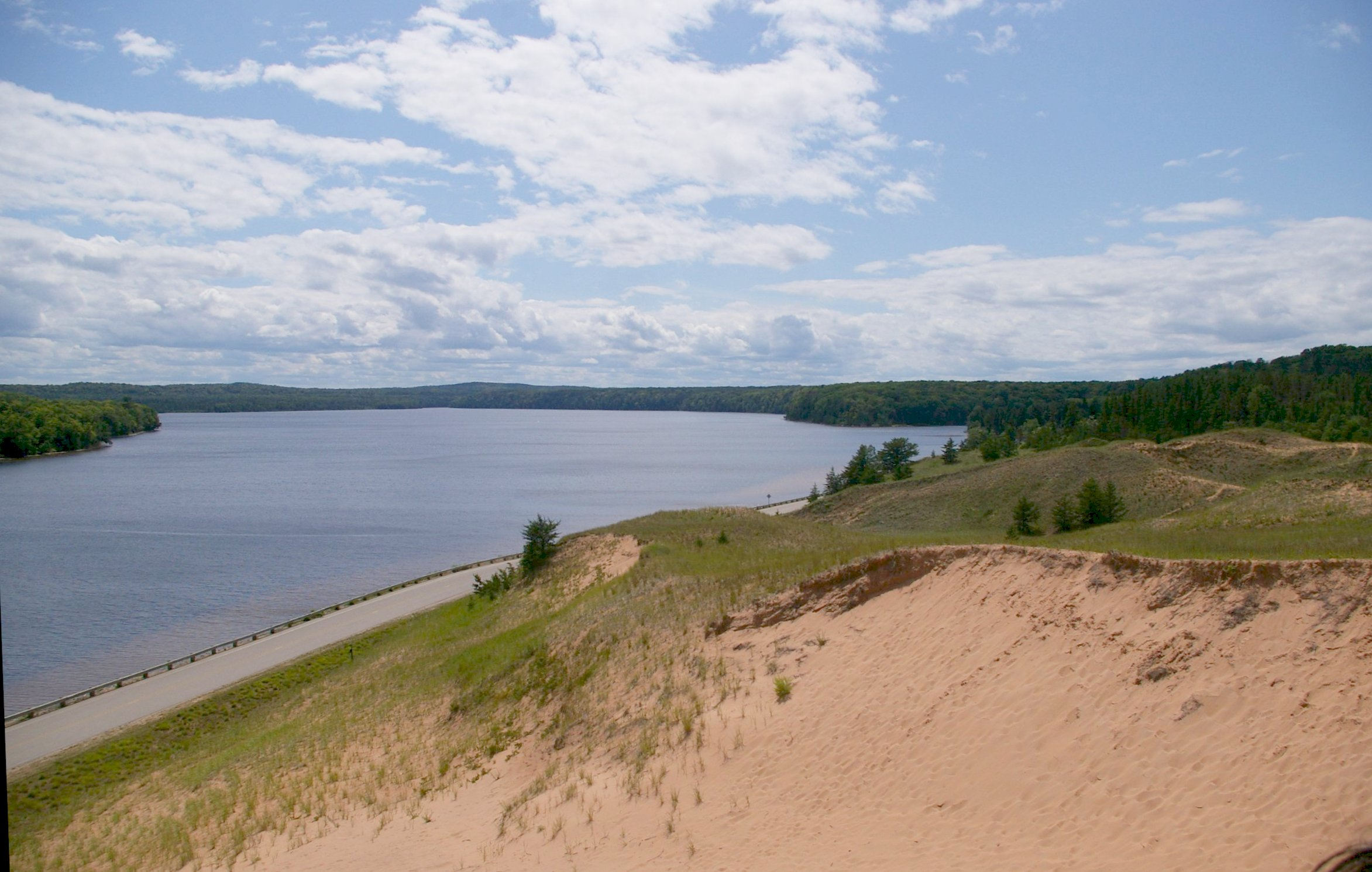
- Grand Sable Lake

- Location within Michigan
- Location: Alger County, Michigan
- Coordinates: 46°38′17.45″N 86°2′24.47″W
- Primary inflows: Towes, Rhody, DeMull Creeks.
- Primary outflows: Sable Creek
- Basin countries: United States
- Max. length: 2.2 mi (3.5 km)
- Max. width: 0.7 mi (1.1 km)
- Surface area: 630 acres (250 ha)
- Average depth: 40 ft (12 m)
- Max. depth: 85 ft (26 m)
- Surface elevation: 741 feet (226 m)

Grand Sable Lake is an undeveloped lake in Michigan's Upper Peninsula near the town of Grand Marais, Michigan. It lies within the boundaries of the Pictured Rocks National Lakeshore.

County Highway H-58 runs along the northwestern shore of the lake and provides access to the Grand Sable Dunes which overlook the lake. Additionally, there is a sandy beach and picnic area available to visitors. There is a concrete boat access site on the eastern shore of the lake.

The soils around Grand Sable Lake are very sandy and the shoreline is mostly wooded

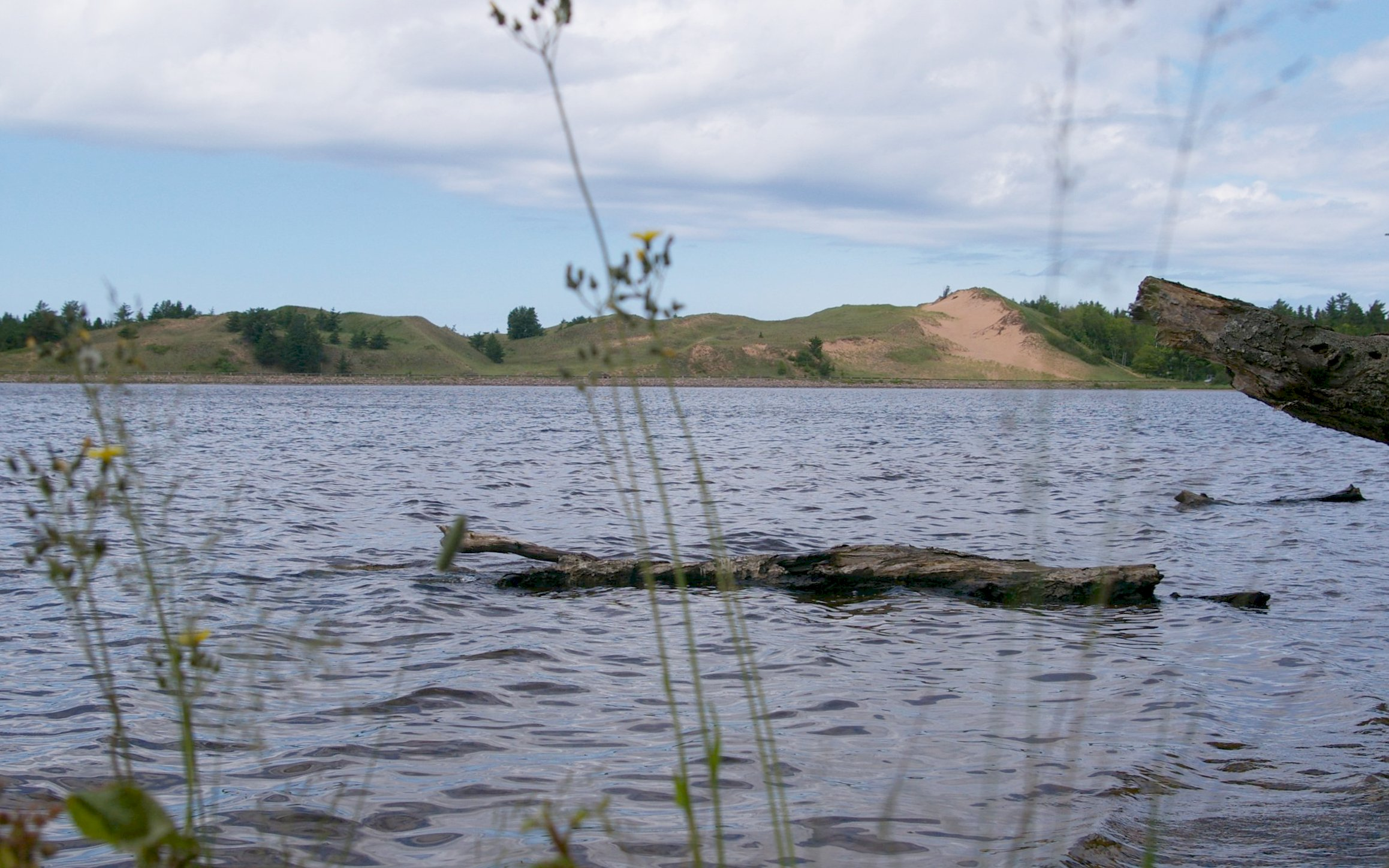
View of Grand Sable Dunes across Grand Sable Lake from the boat access area

== See also ==
- List of lakes in Michigan
