= Miners River =

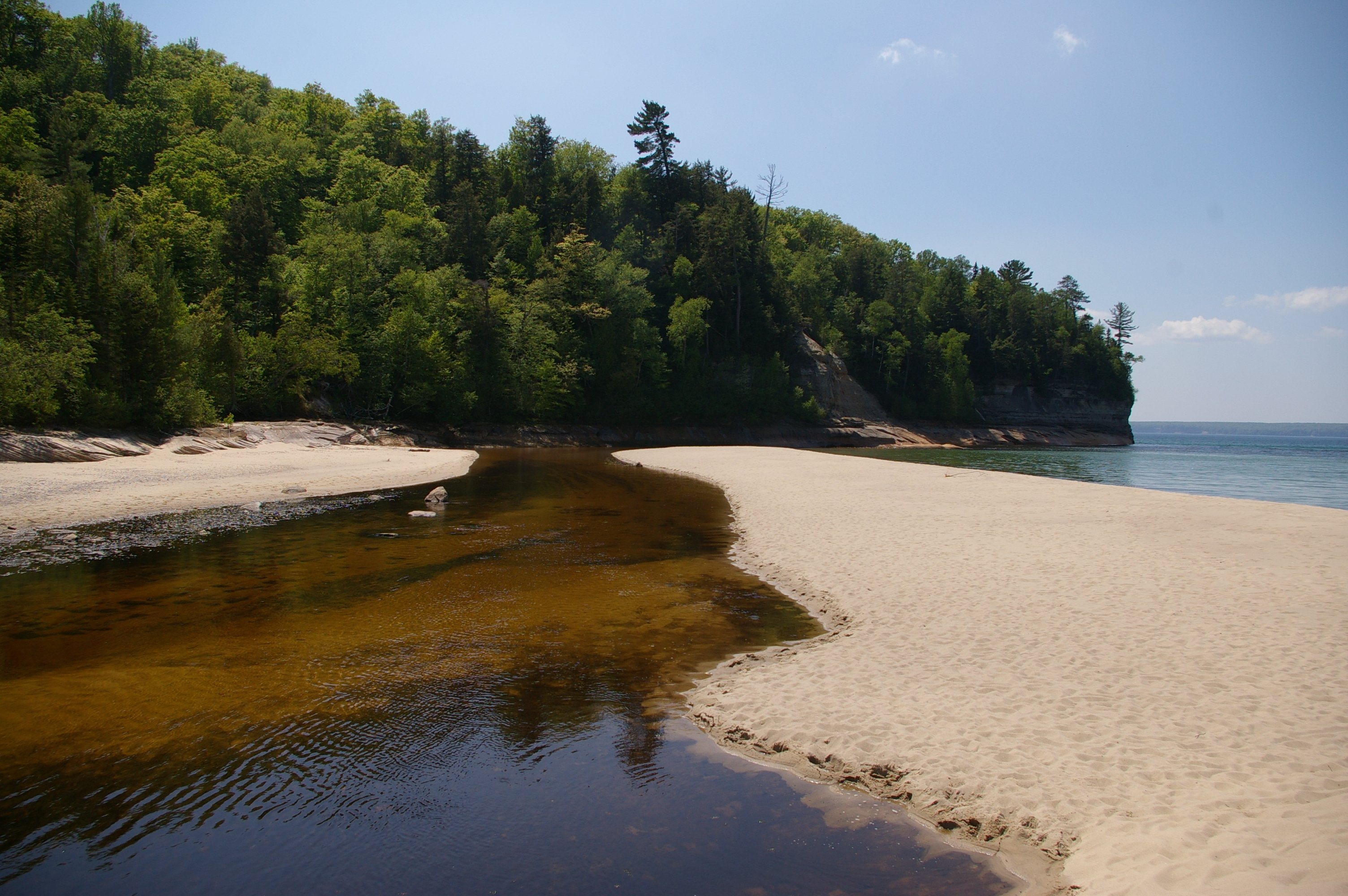
- Mouth of Miners River at Miners Beach

Location
- Country: United States

Physical characteristics
- Source
  - location: Alger County, Michigan
  - coordinates: 46.4294°N 86.5763°W
- Mouth
  - location: Lake Superior, Michigan
  - coordinates: 46.4952°N 86.5454°W
- Length: 12.4 mi (20.0 km)

The Miners River is a river on the Upper Peninsula of Michigan in the United States. It is the largest river in the Pictured Rocks National Lakeshore. Miners River has its origin outside of the National Lakeshore, north of Indian Town in the Hiawatha National Forest, and flows 12.4 miles (20.0 km) into Lake Superior. Miners Lake and Miners Falls are found along the river. The river empties into Lake Superior at the western end of Miners Beach. It is popular for tourism and fishing.

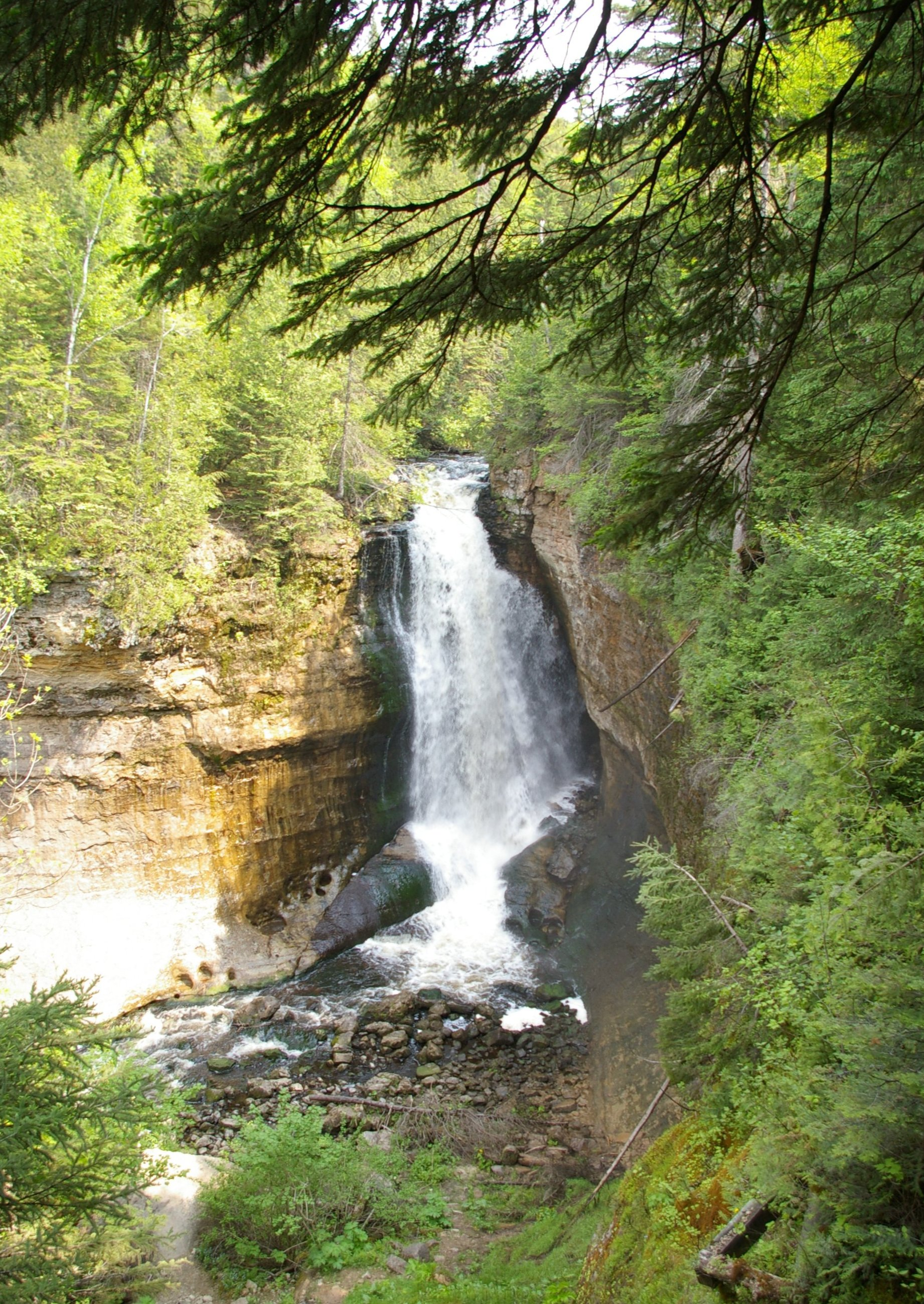
View of Miners Falls on Miners River

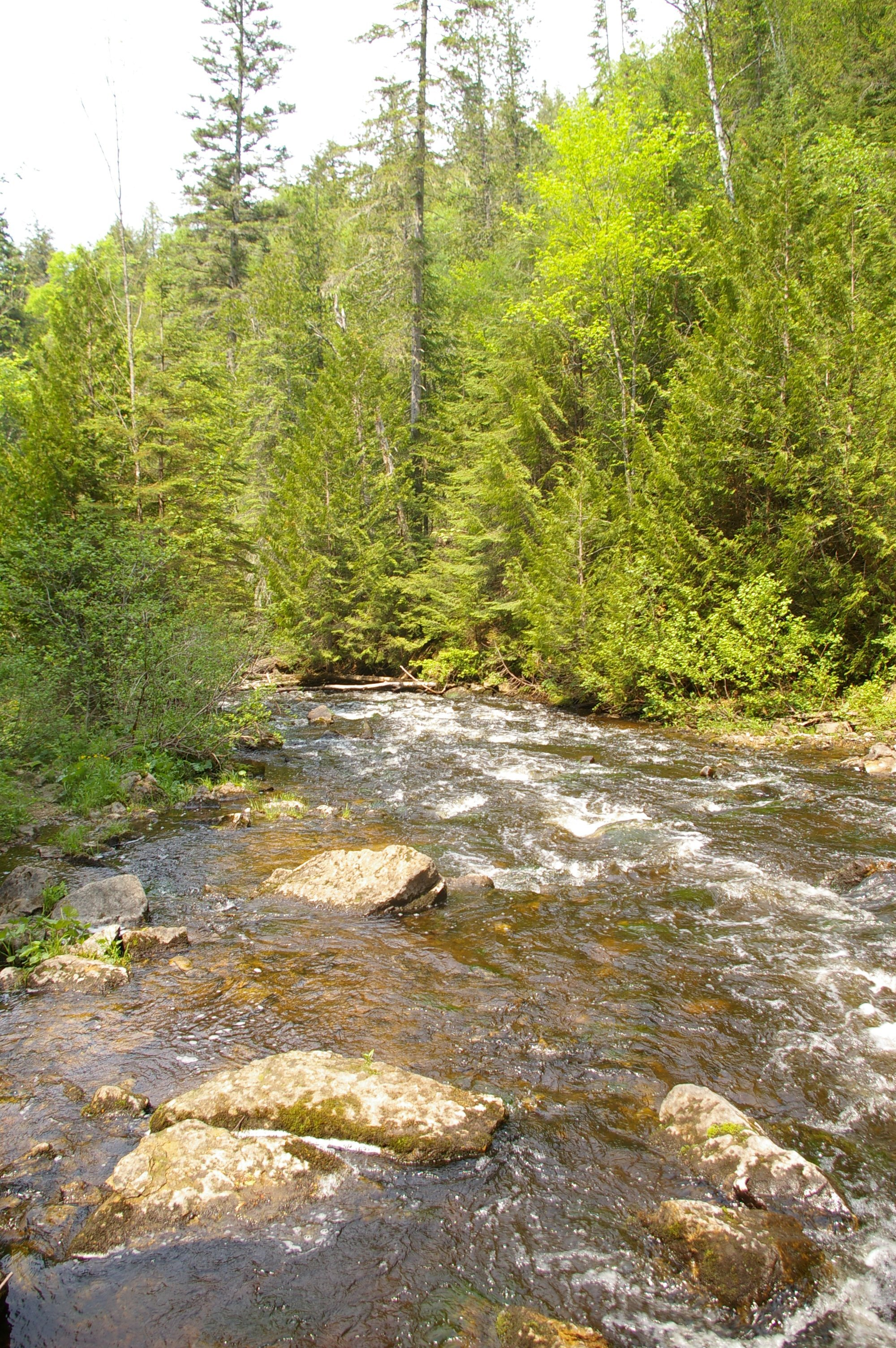
A view of Miners River below Miners Falls

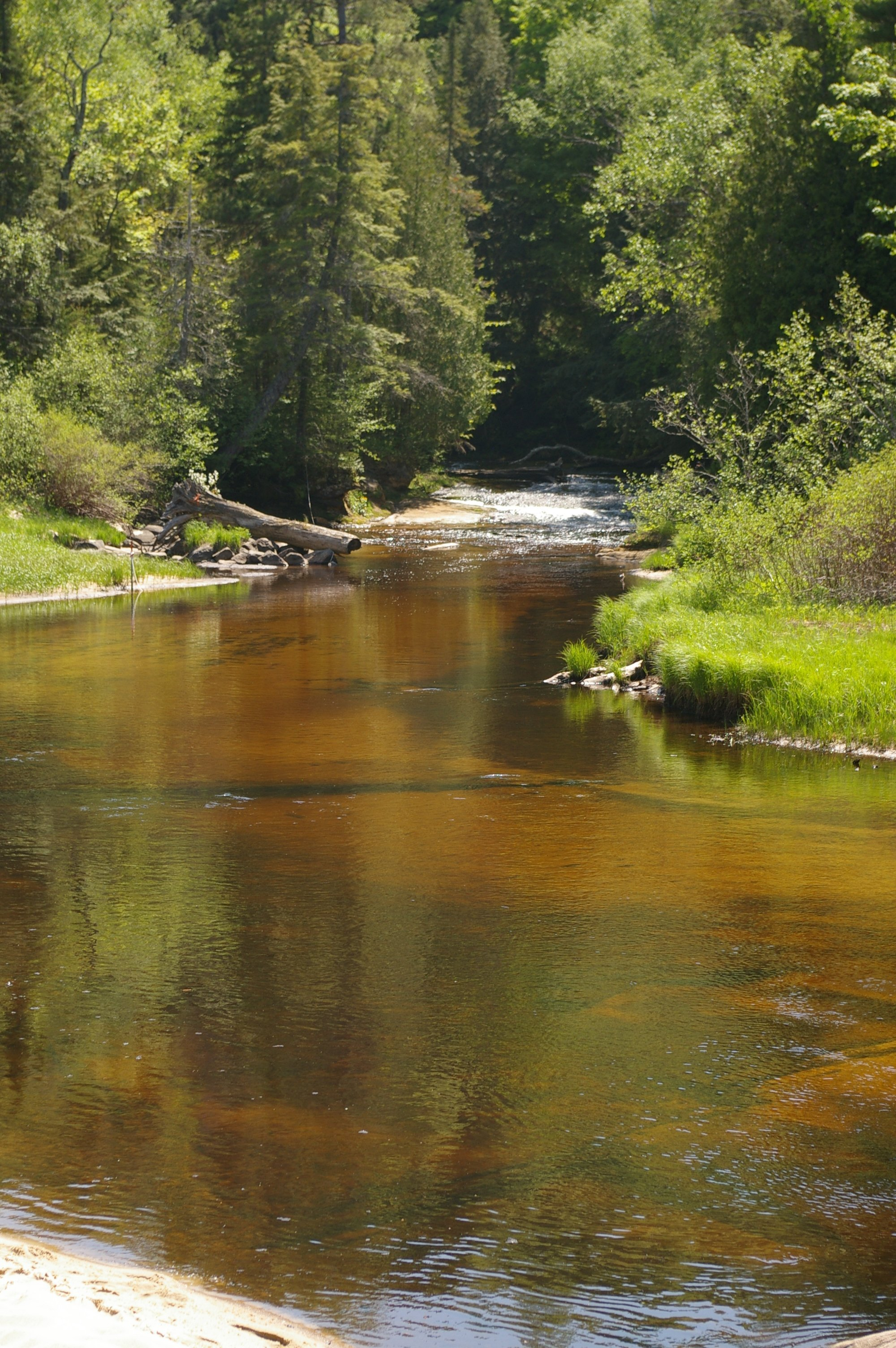
Miners River near the outlet to Lake Superior

== See also ==
- List of rivers of Michigan
