= Munising Falls =

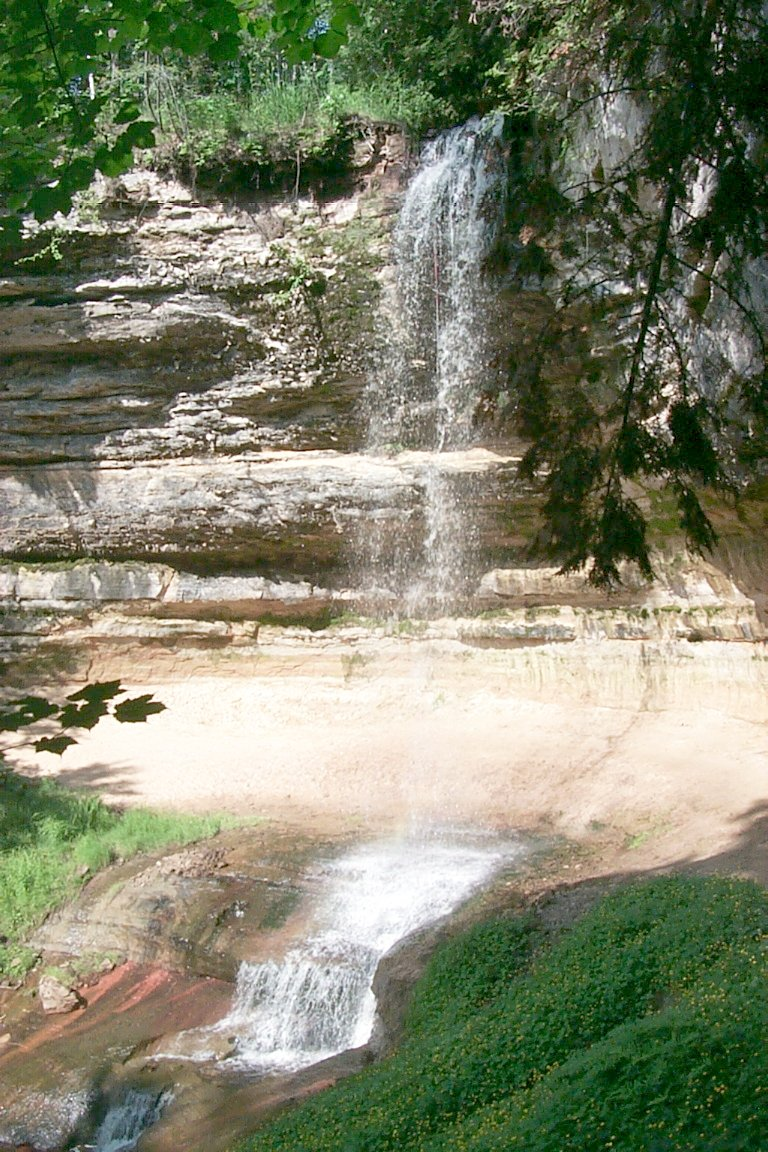
- View of Munising Falls near the base
- Interactive map of Munising Falls
- Location: Pictured Rocks National Lakeshore, Michigan
- Coordinates: 46.42278°N 86.62139°W
- Total height: 50 feet (15 m)
- Watercourse: Munising Creek

Munising Falls is a waterfall located in Munising in the westernmost portion of the Pictured Rocks National Lakeshore in Alger County, Michigan. The falls drops about 50 feet (15 m) over a sandstone cliff. With the exception of the spring thaw, the amount of water falling is relatively small. There are trails leading to multiple viewpoints around the falls.

In the winter, the falls freeze forming an ice column. Munising Falls themselves are off-limits to climbers, but ice climbing is popular in the area and there are other spots in the vicinity where climbing is allowed.

The Munising Falls Visitor Center includes displays are the natural and cultural history of the Pictured Rocks National Lakeshore, including early iron smelting, geology, forest history, rare and endangered species, logging and recreation. The Center is open seasonally.

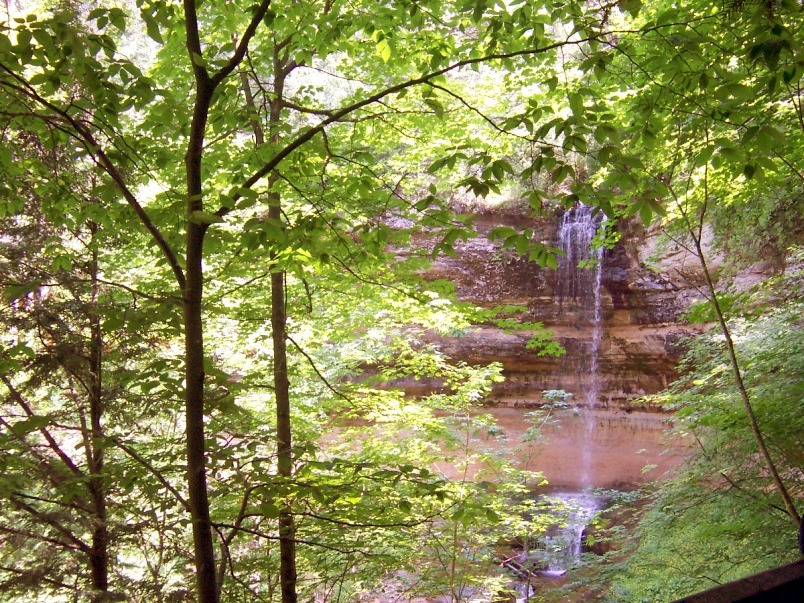
Munising Falls

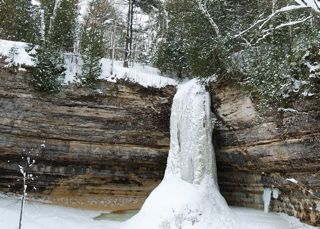
Munising Falls

A short video clip of the falls

== See also ==
- List of waterfalls
