= Benefic =

Benefic may refer to:

- Benefic planet, a good-doing planet in astrology
- Benefic Press, an American publisher

== See also ==
- Malefic (disambiguation)
