= Pickle Barrel House =

Historic house in Michigan, United States

- U.S. National Register of Historic Places
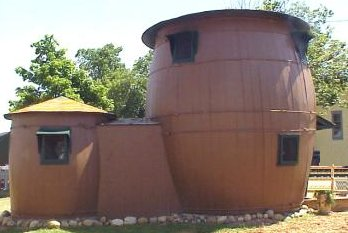

- Location within Michigan Location within the United States
- Interactive map
- Location: Burt Township, Michigan
- Coordinates: 46°40′16.03″N 85°59′5.07″W
- Area: 3 acres (1.2 ha)
- Built: 1926
- Architect: Harold S. Cunliff
- NRHP reference No.: 03001548
- Added to NRHP: February 4, 2004

The Pickle Barrel House is a two-story cabin built to in the shape of two barrels. The house design is based on the artwork of William Donahey, an author-illustrator who created the Teenie Weenies cartoon characters that were two inches (5.1 cm) tall and lived under a rose bush in a pickle barrel. The house was used as a summer home by Donahey and his wife for ten years. It is currently located in Grand Marais on Michigan's Upper Peninsula near the southern shore of Lake Superior. It is near the intersection of State Highway M-77 and County Highway H-58 in this gateway town to the Pictured Rocks National Lakeshore. The main part is a 16-foot-tall (4.9 m) barrel and has two stories. The main floor is for the living area, and the upstairs is a bedroom. A smaller barrel serves as the kitchen, and the two barrels are connected by a pantry. There is an outdoor seating area with a large historical marker.

== History ==
=== Early ===
William Donahey was an author, illustrator, and cartoonist. He created the Teenie Weenies cartoon feature, which was a widely syndicated comic that debuted in the Chicago Tribune in 1914. The comic feature continued until his death in 1970. It featured tiny people who lived in a world of life-sized objects. To these tiny people the real world objects were gargantuan.

In the early 1920s, Donahey contracted with the Reid-Murdock & Company of Chicago to allow use of the Teenie Weenie characters to promote their Monarch Foods line. Teenie Weenies subsequently appeared on many of the labels of Monarch food products aimed at children, including toffee, peanut butter, popcorn, and all kinds of canned vegetables. The signature product was Teenie Weenie Sweet Pickles, which were sold in a small wooden keg that could be refilled by the grocer. One advertisement featured a small pickle keg that was used as a house by two Teenie Weenie newlyweds.

In 1926, Reid-Murdock decided to create a life-sized version of the small pickle house featured in the ad, and construct it near Grand Marais, where the Donaheys liked to vacation in the summer. Reid-Murdock ordered the Pickle Barrel House to be built by the Pioneer Cooperage Company of Chicago, the same company that made the small wooden kegs. The barrel house was a large-scale version of the miniature oak casks that held the Monarch-brand pickles. Pioneer Cooperage first built it in Chicago at their workshop, then took it apart and shipped it to Grand Marais, where it was assembled outside of town on the shore of Sable Lake. All went well until the door and window openings were cut. The barrels immediately began to twist and sag, and the workers had to add special braces and bolts above and below each opening to maintain the shape of the barrel.

Donahey's wife, Mary Dickerson Donahey, was herself an author. This special cottage would be for the Donaheys to use as a summer cabin in the woods at Grand Sable Lake where they liked to fish. The Donaheys received much attention for their "barrel house on the lake" since nobody had ever seen anything like this before. However, after 10 years it became a burden because of all the curiosity seekers and onlookers wanting to see how they lived. Ultimately they moved it from its original lake location. The Donaheys then built a log cabin on the spot where the barrel house had stood, and they continued to summer in Grand Marais for many more years.

=== Later ===
The Pickle Barrel house was moved to downtown Grand Marais in 1936 from the woods at nearby Grand Sable Lake when the Donaheys gave it to Mr. Hill, a local businessman and friend. Through the years it was an ice-cream stand, an information kiosk booth, and a souvenir gift shop. Gradually the barrel house fell into disrepair. In 2003 the Grand Marais Historical Society acquired the property. They undertook the project of restoring the structure to its original condition. On July 3, 2005, after much work and with a budget of $125,000 (equivalent to $192,000 in 2024) in expenses the renovated Pickle Barrel House was opened to the public. The barrel house now shows how the Donaheys lived there in their summer cottage in the woods by the lake in the 1920s and 1930s.

The barrel house museum has pictures of the Donaheys in their one-of-a-kind pickle barrel cottage. Some of these photos of the 1920s even show the "curiosity visitors" at their cottage in the woods. In the museum also are several books and other materials on William Donahey and his children's Teenie Weenies. One room showcases William Donahey and his artwork of creations of the Teenie Weenies. In this room is a seven-inch (18 cm) barrel on display showing a promotion for Monarch sweet pickles. The barrel house pretty much recreates its appearance and atmosphere when the Donaheys lived there. Tourists who visit the house can now get the feel for what everyday life in a barrel would be like.

== Historical marker ==
There is a Michigan Historical Marker at the Pickle Barrel House location. The barrel home has been accepted on the Michigan Register of Historic Places and is a Michigan Historic Home. It is also listed on the National Register of Historic Places.

== Gallery ==
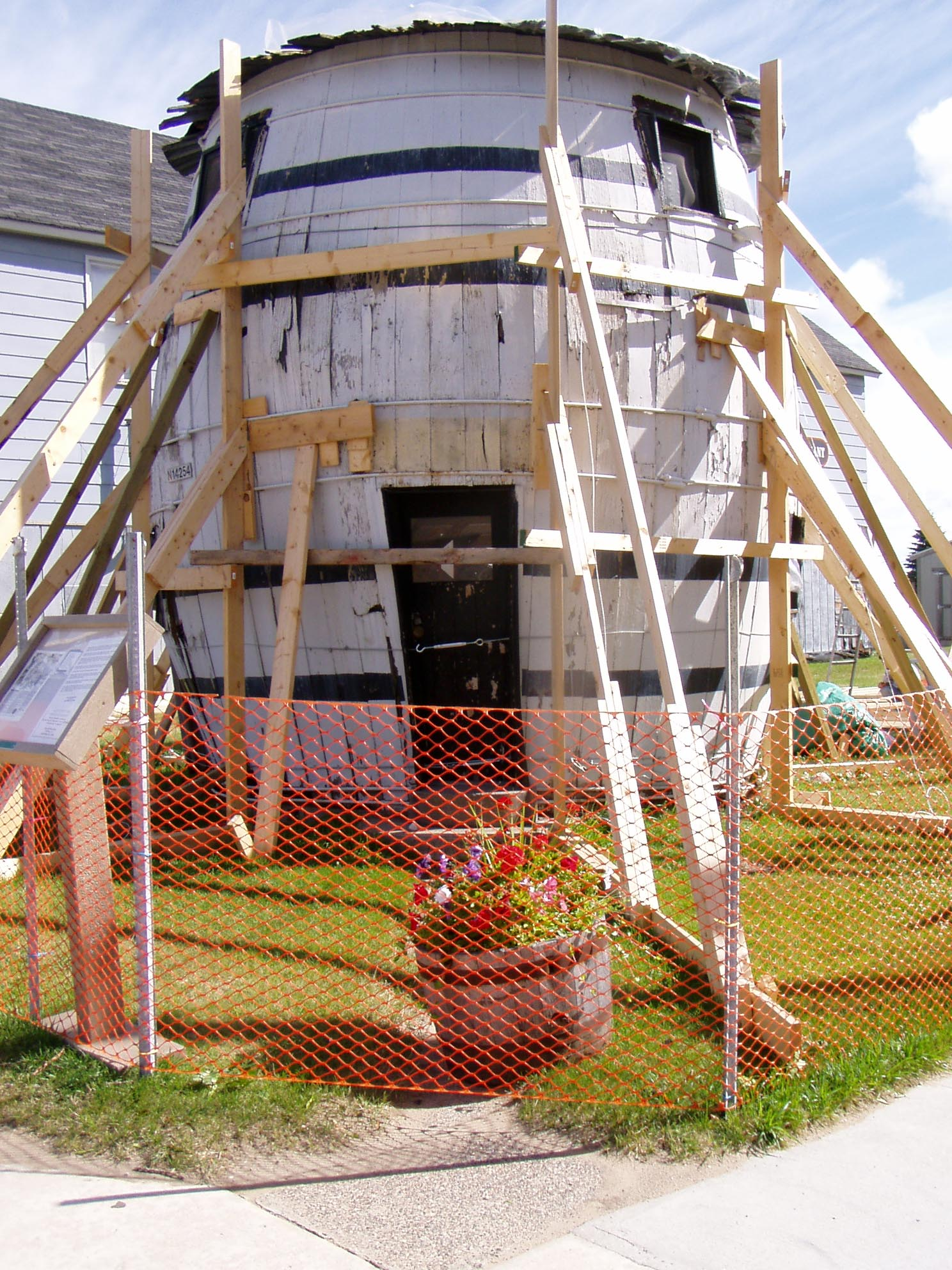
Pickle Barrel House in Grand Marais, Michigan, under repair in 2004

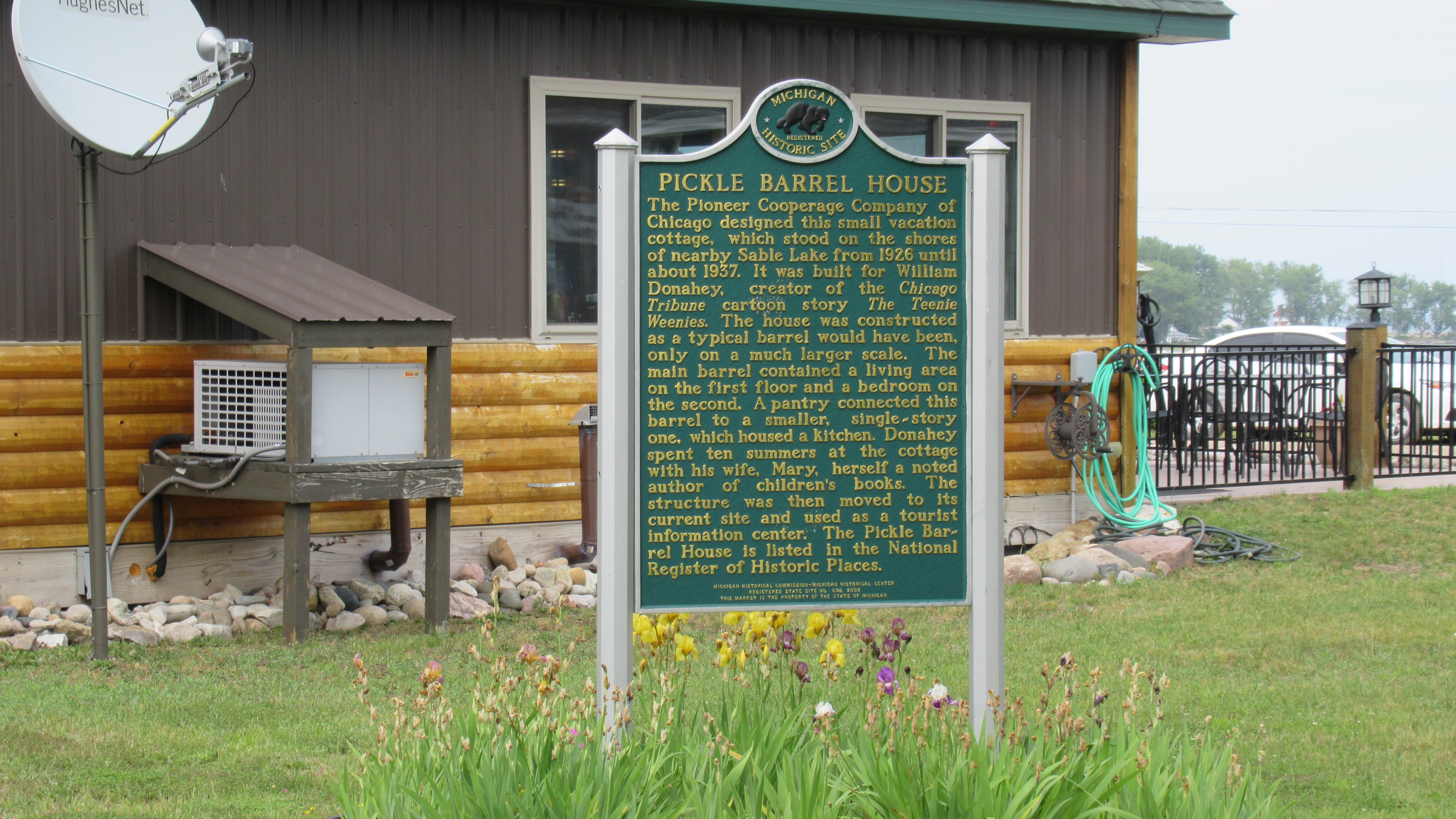
Pickle Barrel House historical sign

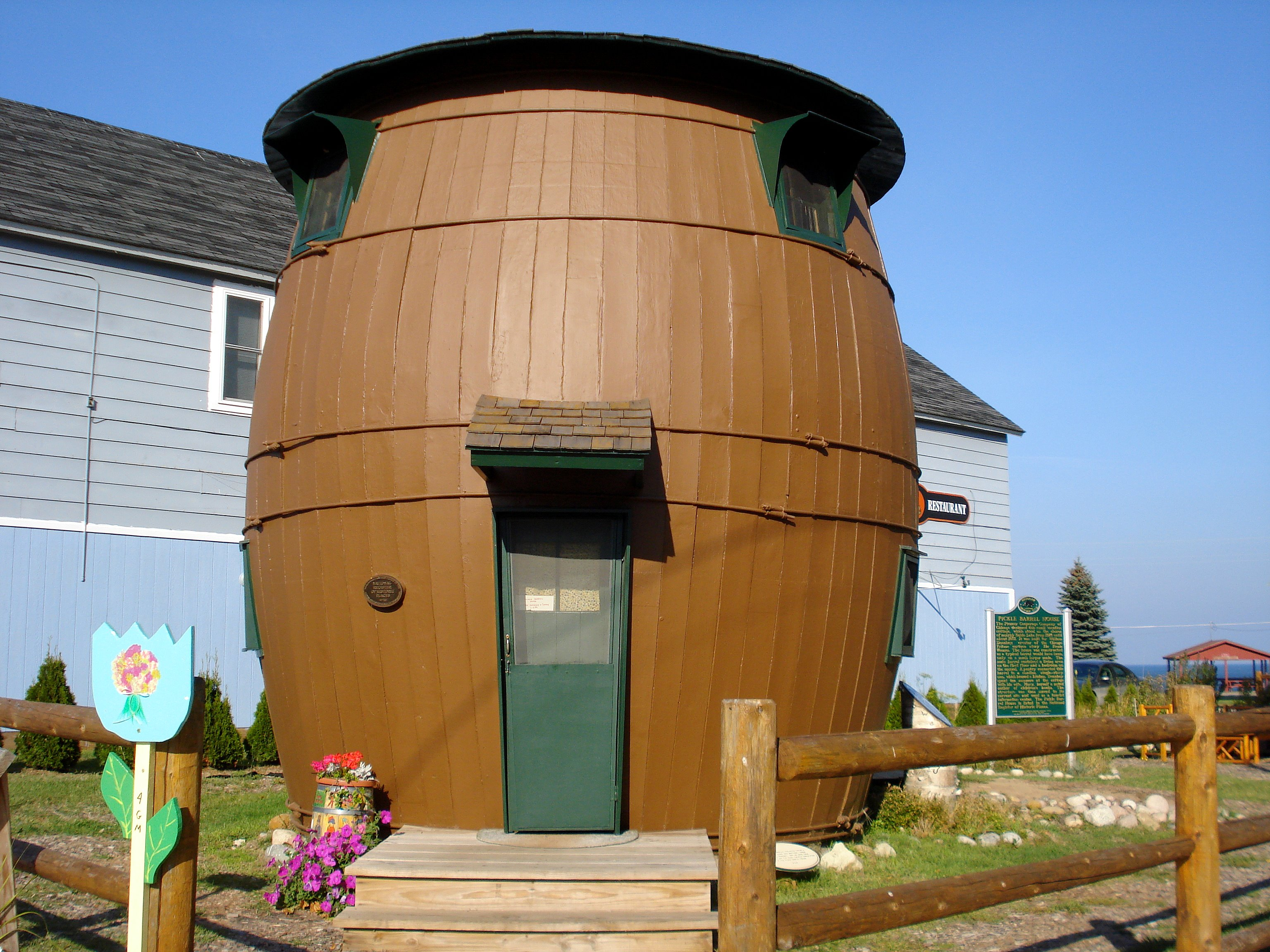
Pickle Barrel House in 2008

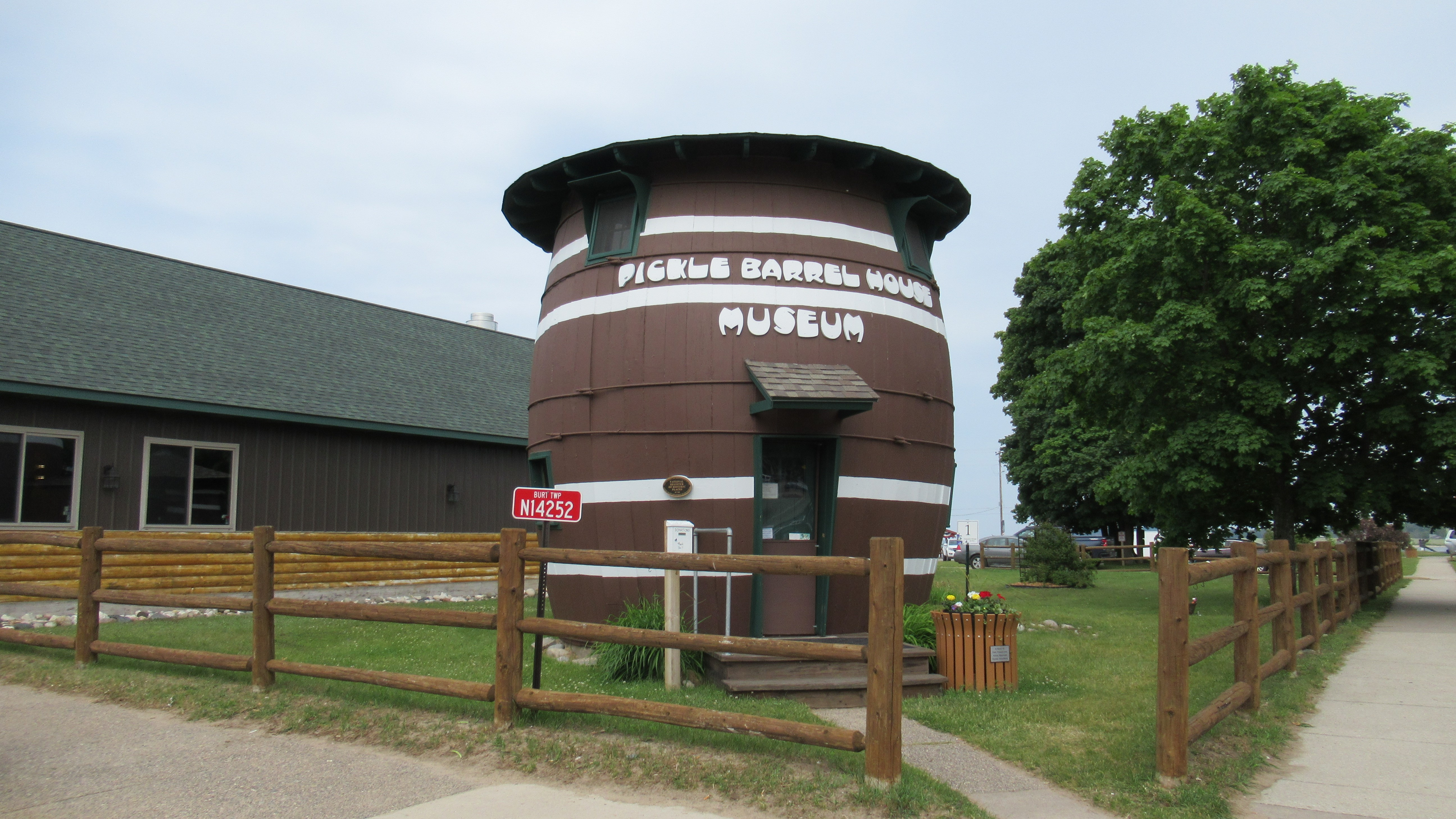
Pickle Barrel House in 2021

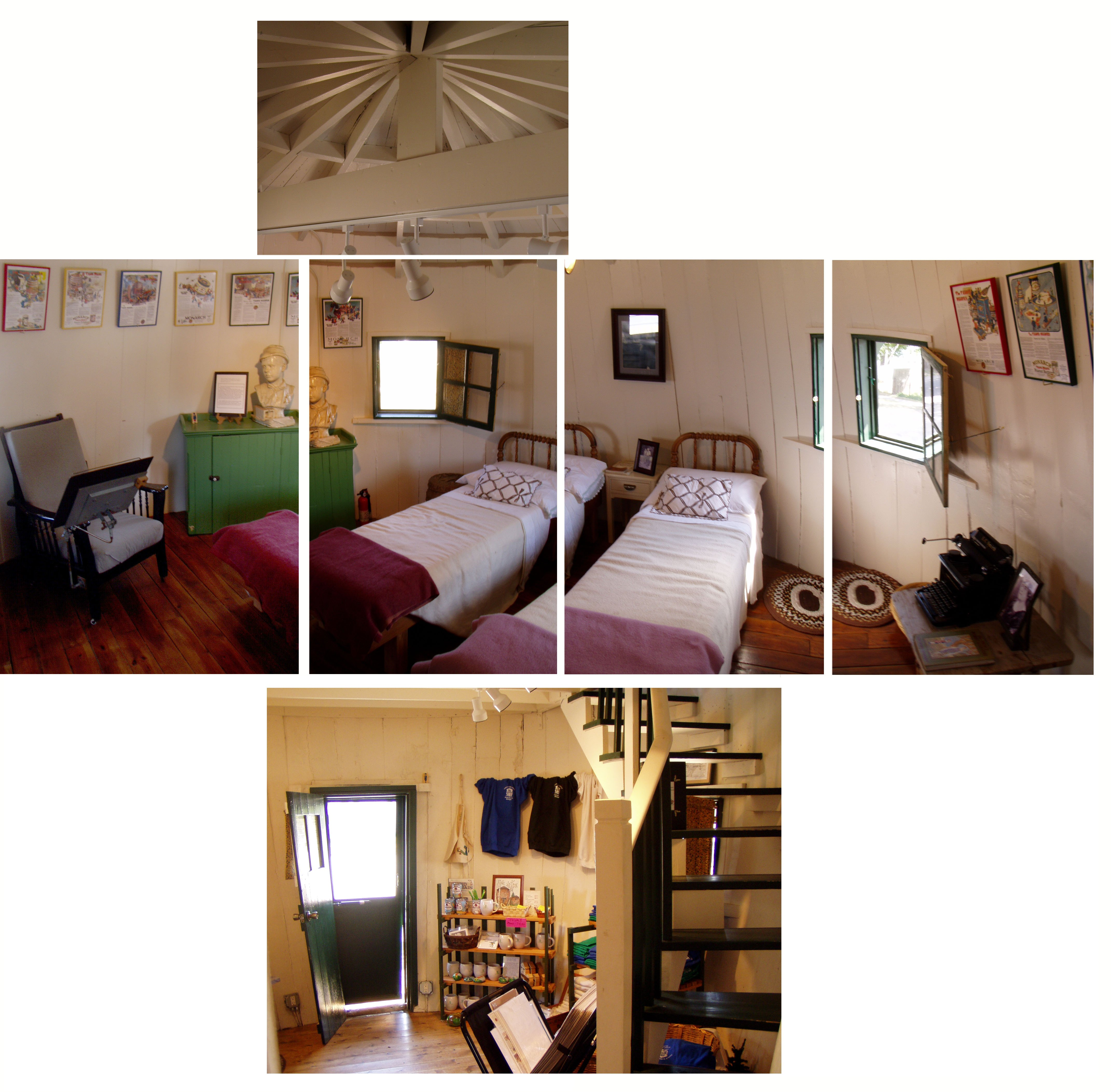
Pickle Barrel House interior
