= Burt Township, Alger County, Michigan =

Burt Township, Michigan
- Civil township
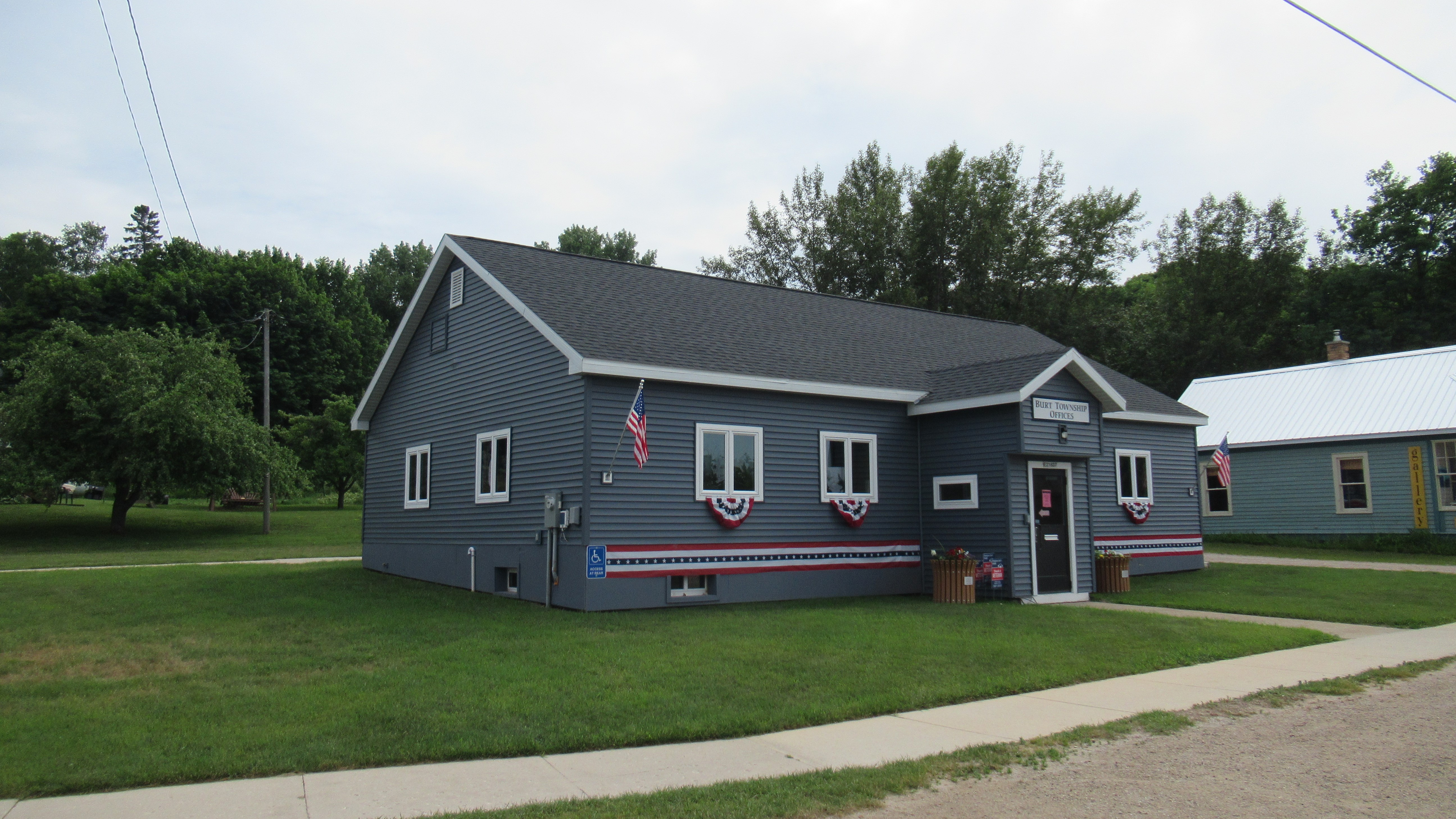
- Burt Township Offices in Grand Marais

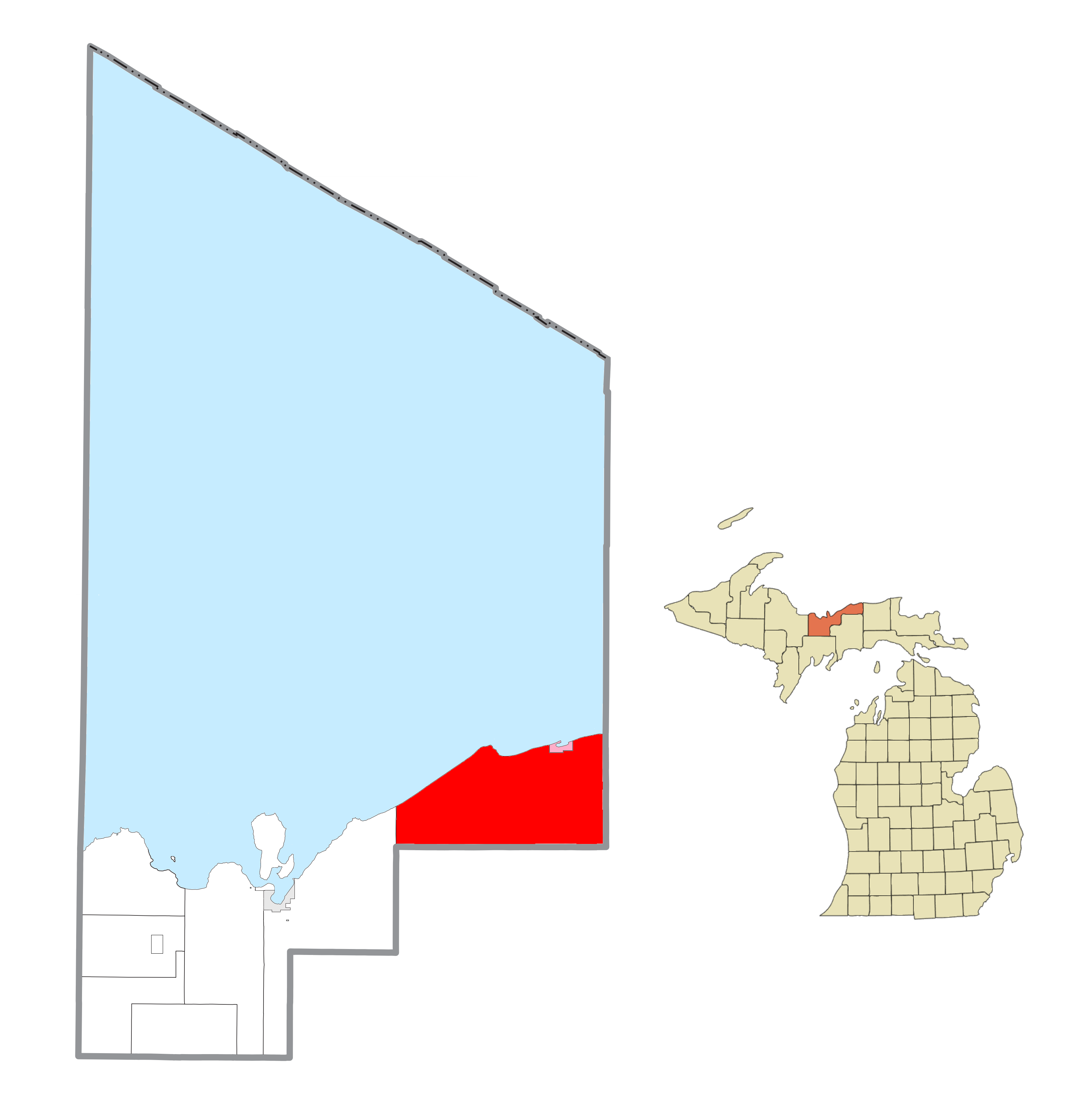
- Location within Alger County (red) and the administered CDP of Grand Marais (pink)

- Location within the state of Michigan Location within the United States
- Coordinates: 46°36′16″N 86°02′58″W
- Country: United States
- State: Michigan
- County: Alger

Government
  - Supervisor: Jon Babbitt
  - Clerk: Lori McShane

Area
  - Total: 258.03 sq mi (668.3 km^{2})
  - Land: 230.48 sq mi (596.9 km^{2})
  - Water: 27.55 sq mi (71.4 km^{2})
- Elevation: 968 ft (295 m)

Population (2020)
  - Total: 411
  - Density: 2.26/sq mi (0.87/km^{2})
- Time zone: UTC-5 (Eastern (EST))
  - Summer (DST): UTC-4 (EDT)
- ZIP code(s): 49839 (Grand Marais); 49883 (Seney); 49884 (Shingleton)
- Area code: 906
- FIPS code: 26-11960
- GNIS feature ID: 1626008
- Website: Official website

Burt Township is a civil township of Alger County in the U.S. state of Michigan. As of the 2020 census, its population was 411.

The township contains the community of Grand Marais, which contains numerous historic structures, including the Pickle Barrel House and the Grand Marais Harbor of Refuge Inner and Outer Lights. The township is also the eastern gateway to the Pictured Rocks National Lakeshore and includes the Au Sable Light on the shores of Lake Superior.

== Geography ==
According to the United States Census Bureau, the township has a total area of 258.03 square miles (668.29 km^{2}), of which 230.48 square miles (596.94 km^{2}) is land and 27.55 square miles (71.35 km^{2}) (10.68%) is water.

=== Communities ===
- Grand Marais is at the northern terminus of M-77 and is the eastern gateway into the Pictured Rocks National Lakeshore.
- Green Haven is at 46°32′20″N 86°00′56″W on M-77 north of Seney.
- Youngs was the name of a post office in the township at 46°30′19″N 85°58′08″W, near the southern boundary with Seney Township in Schoolcraft County. The station on the Mantistique Railway was named McDonald, but the post office was named for Frank Youngs, the first postmaster. The office operated from May 5, 1899, until May 15, 1901.

== Demographics ==
Historical population
Census	Pop.	Note	%±
1960	457		—
1970	424		−7.2%
1980	539		27.1%
1990	508		−5.8%
2000	480		−5.5%
2010	522		8.8%
Source: Census Bureau. Census 1960- 2000, 2010.

As of 2020, its population was 411 and it had a median household income of $41,778.

== Education ==
Burt Township is served by the Burt Township School District, which has its boundaries conterminous with the township.

== Transportation ==
=== Airport ===
- Grand Marais Airport is located within Burt Township.

=== Highways ===
- M-77 runs south–north through the center of the township and terminates just before Lake Superior.
- H-58 travels east–west in and out of township and enters in the eastern portion of Pictured Rocks.
