= Guff =

Guff may refer to:

- Surname of various characters in the comic strip The Teenie Weenies
- Nickname of a statue in Herald Square, New York City
- Guff, Punjab, a place in Pakistan

== See also ==
- Guf
