= Y98 =

Y98 may refer to:

- Y98 (radio)
- Grand Marais Airport FAA code
- Yttrium-98 (Y-98 or ^{98}Y), an isotope of yttrium
