= Burt Township School District =

School district in Grand Marais, Michigan

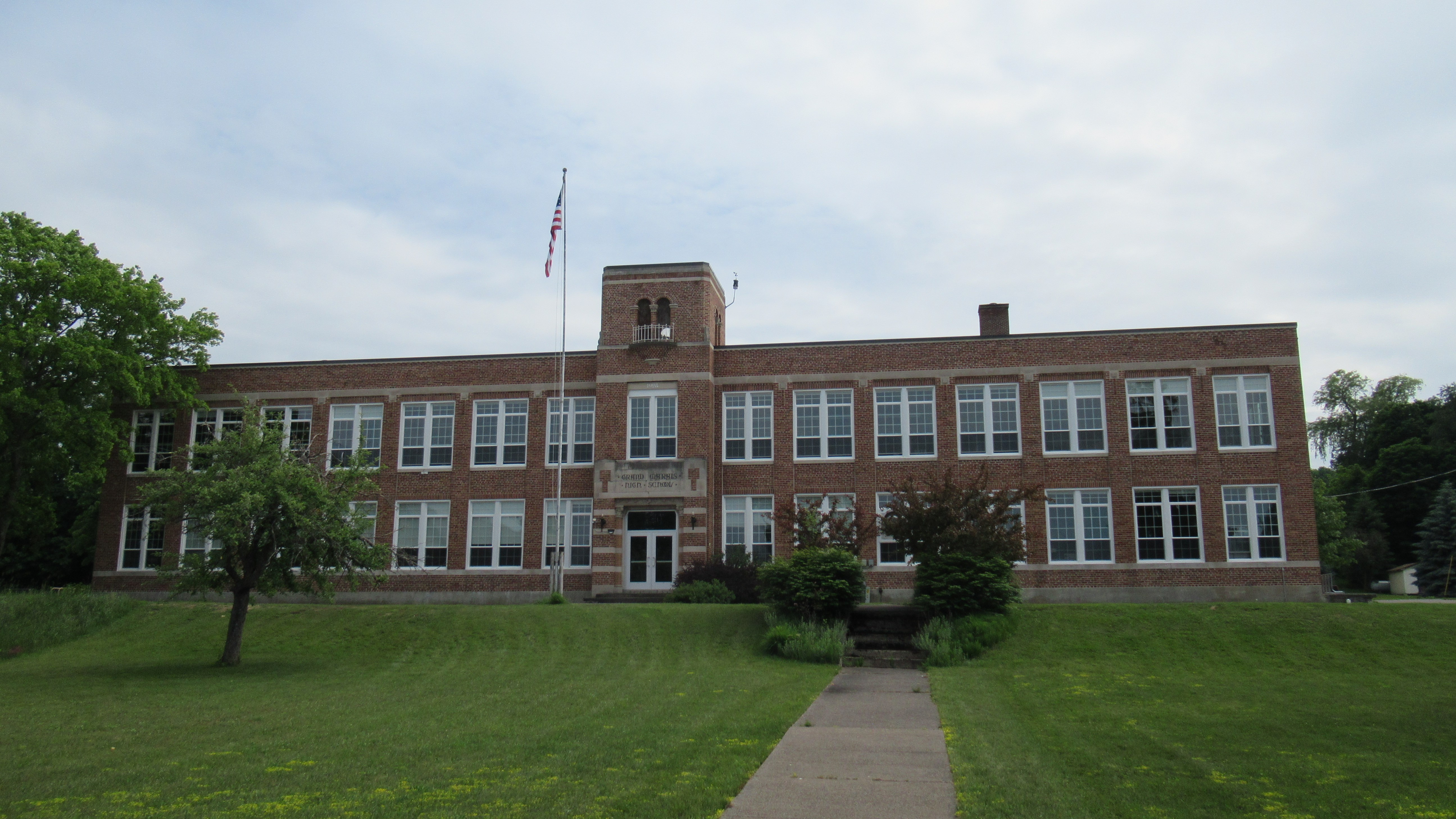
- Grand Marais High School in 2021

Address
- 27 Colwell Avenue; Grand Marais, Michigan 49839 Alger County; United States

District information
- Grades: K–12
- Established: 1885; 141 years ago

Students and staff
- Students: 33
- Teachers: 6.35
- Student–teacher ratio: 5.2

Other information
- District area: 238.6 sq mi (618.0 km^{2})
- Website: Official website

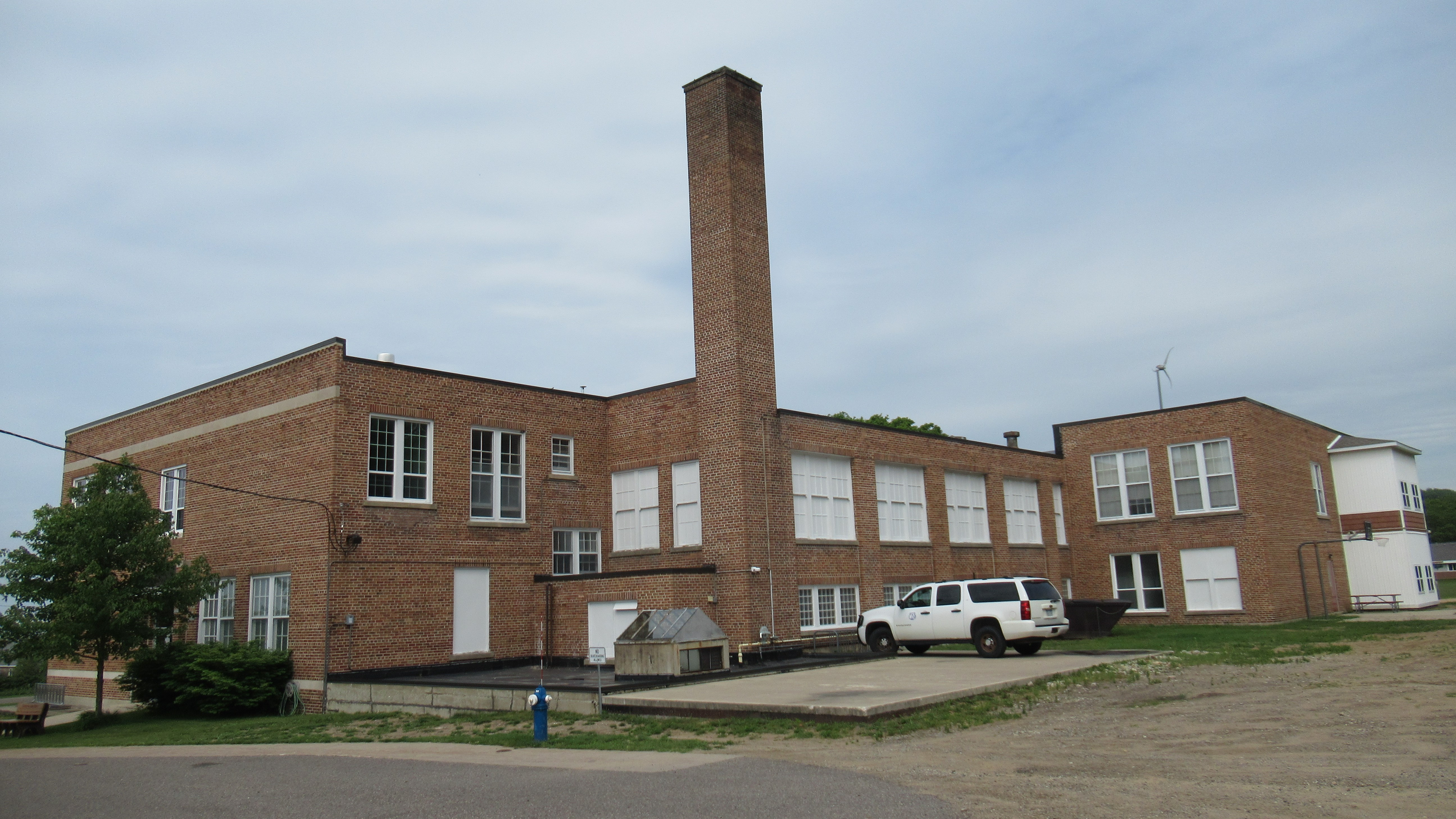
Back view of Grand Marais High School

Burt Township School District is a school district headquartered in the community of Grand Marais in the U.S. state of Michigan. The district serves the entirety of Burt Township. The district covers a very large area of 238.57 square miles (617.89 km^{2}) in northeastern Alger County. (Note: Another source puts it at 230.5 square miles (597.0 km^{2}).)

The district has a single school building, with elementary on the first floor and secondary on the second floor.

== History ==
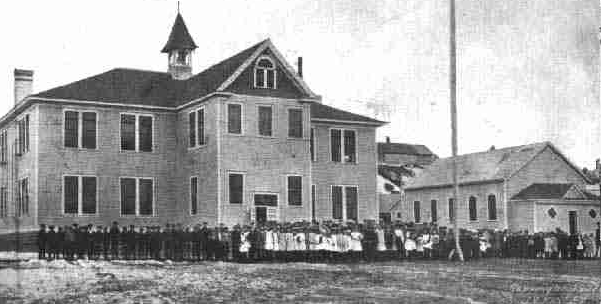
Old school building in early 1900s

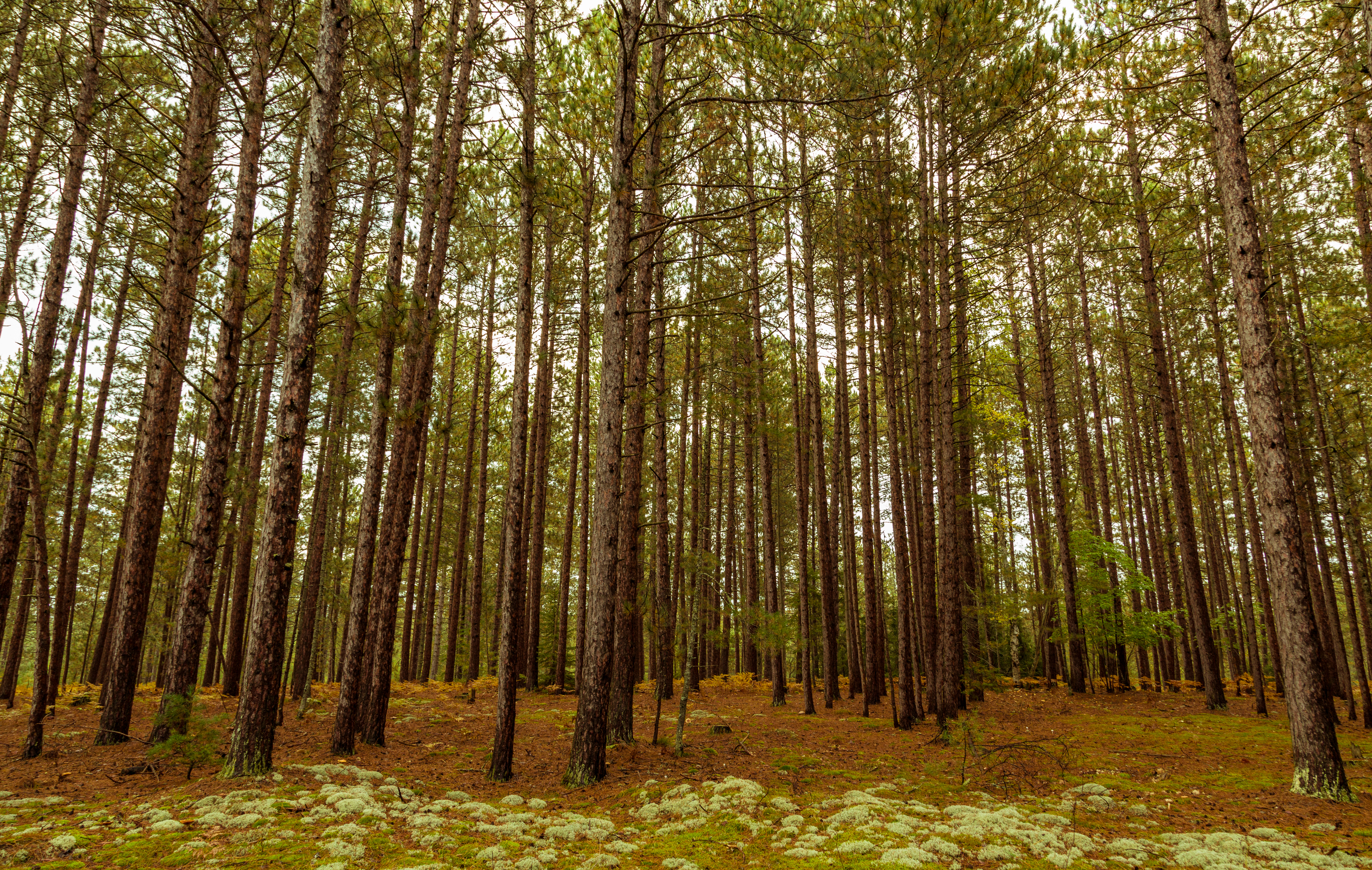
Burt Township School Forest, 2016

The district's history dates to 1885 when a small school was built in Grand Marais serving 50 students. As the area boomed in the early 1900s, the district's attendance grew to 520 students in 1905. The current school building, originally known as Grand Marais High School, was completed in 1929 at a cost of $125,000. The building, which overlooks Lake Superior, is a two-story brick structure with high ceilings and oak-trimmed interiors.

Ira W. Jayne was school superintendent at the onset of the 20th Century. In 1936, The Escanaba Daily Press touted the district's "modern public school system, which offers the children of the community educational advantages comparable to those offered by other cities in the Upper Peninsula."

Beginning in 1983, the school district implemented a novel telephone teaching program. The program, which included microphones and electronic blackboards allowing students in Grand Marais and teachers in Marquette to remotely view each other's work, was funded with a $22,000 grant from the state and made it possible for students to participate in classes offered by the Marquette Public Schools in subjects including art, foreign languages, and advanced mathematics. At the time, it was the only school in Michigan to use telephone teaching. In response to the COVID-19 pandemic, the district has instituted remote learning. which is used as needed.

In 1954, the Burt Township School received an award from the Northern Michigan Sportsmen's Association for its outstanding conservation education program.

In 1984, the Burt Township school system spent more per pupil ($4,958) than any other school district in Michigan. In 2007, the teachers' union voted to become "local only" and disaffiliated with the National Education Association and the Michigan Education Association. In 2018, the voters of the township approved a bond authorizing expenditure of approximately $1 million for maintenance of the school building.

As the area's population declined in the late 20th century, so too did the school's attendance. As of 2007, the school attendance stood at approximately 70 students from kindergarten through 12th grade. By 2015, attendance had declined to 30 students.

The district's future was called into question in 2019 by a proposed cut in a state program providing funding for school districts in remote areas. Governor Gretchen Whitmer used a line-item veto to eliminate the cut.

The school has also served other purposes, including the library serving the community at large and the gymnasium serving as a community recreation center. The Burt Township Schools own a 1,300-acre school forest adjacent to Lake Superior, bordering on the Pictured Rocks National Lakeshore.

The schools are unranked by U.S. News & World Report, which has compiled demographic information on the district's population and students.
