= Malefic =

Malefic may refer to:

- Ma'alefa'ak, a DC Comics character
- Malefic (musician) (born 1973), American musician
- Malefic planet, an evildoing planet in astrology

== See also ==
- Benefic (disambiguation)
