= Grand Marais, Michigan =

- Census-designated place (CDP) & unincorporated community
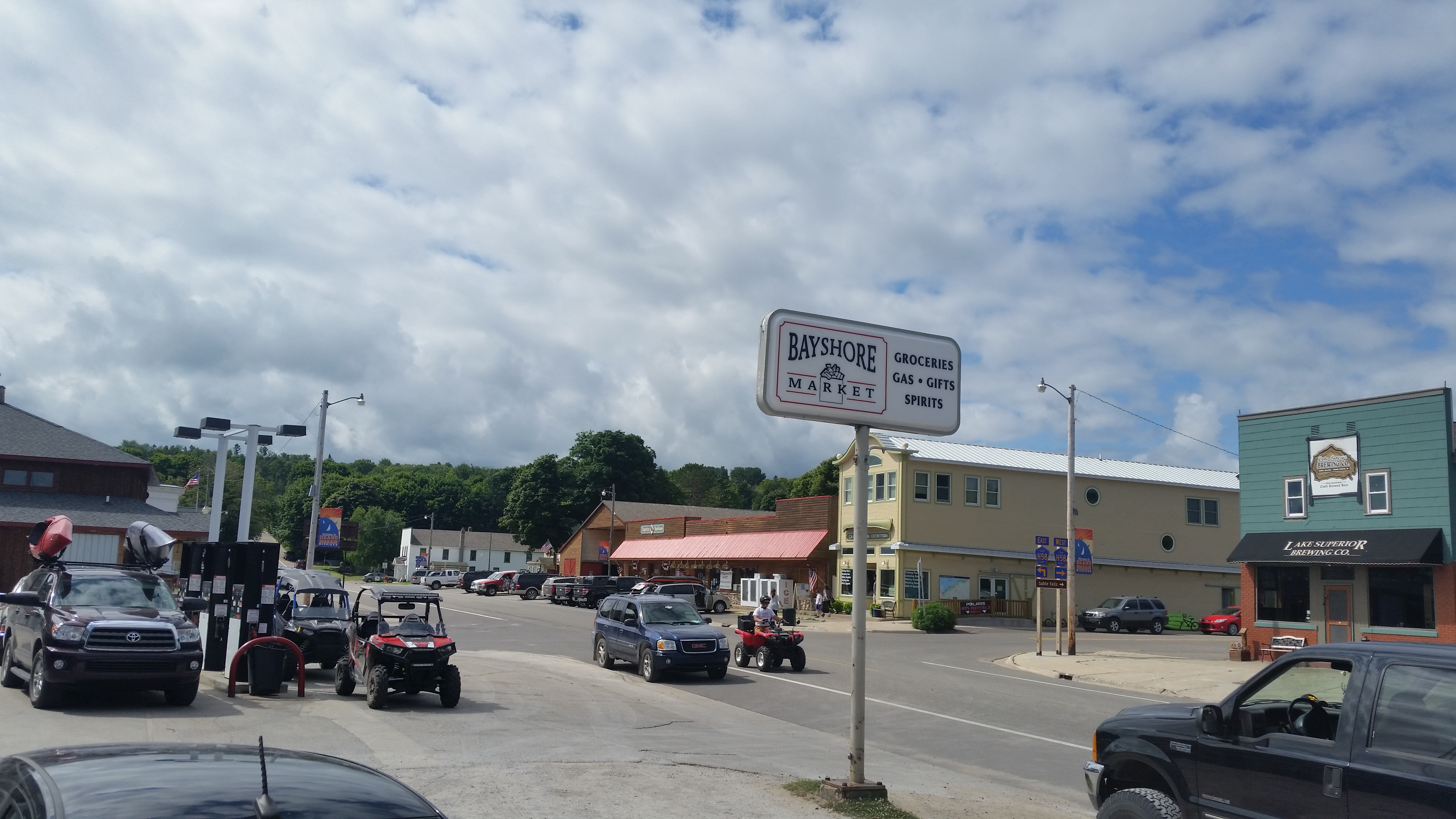
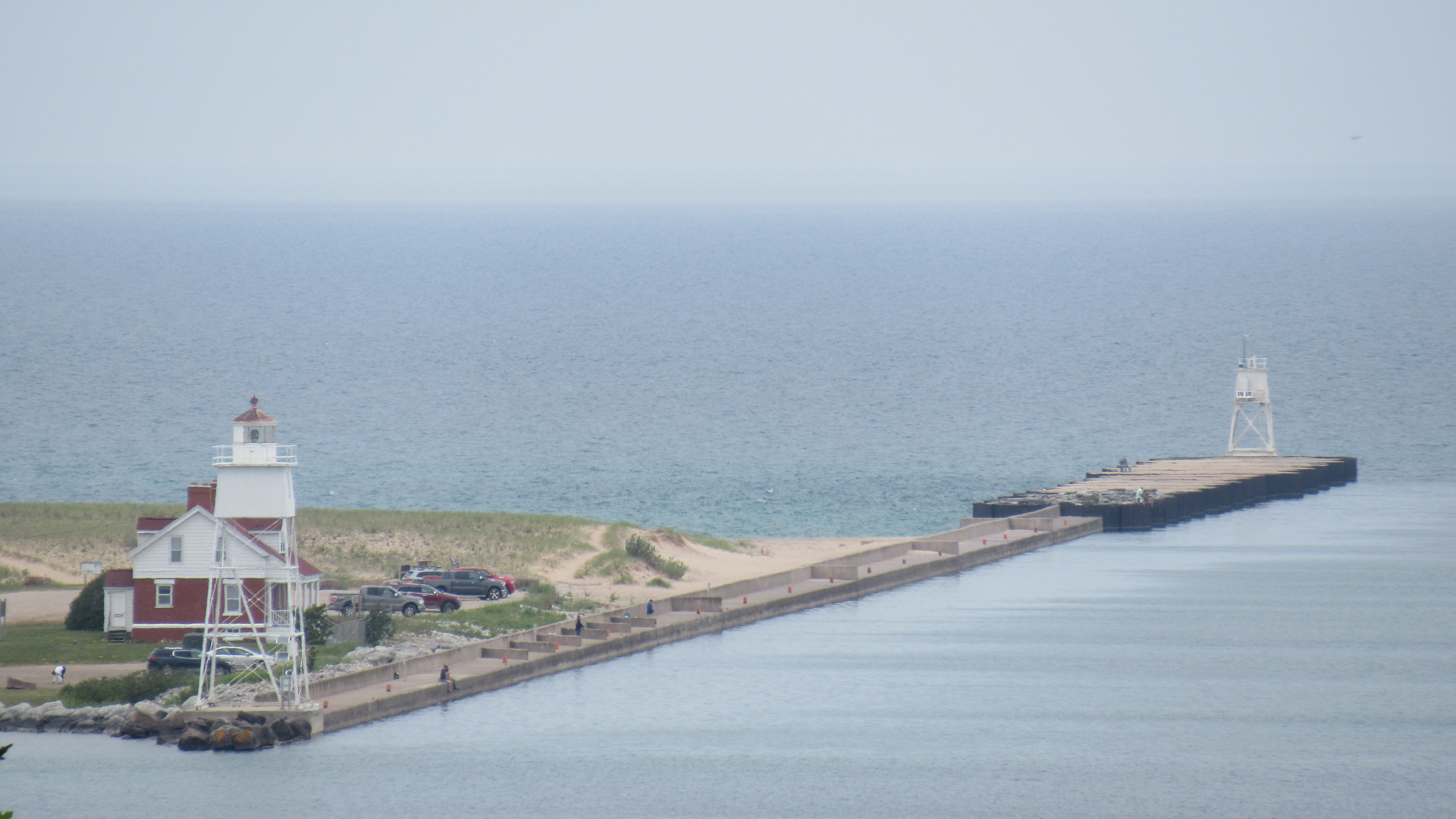
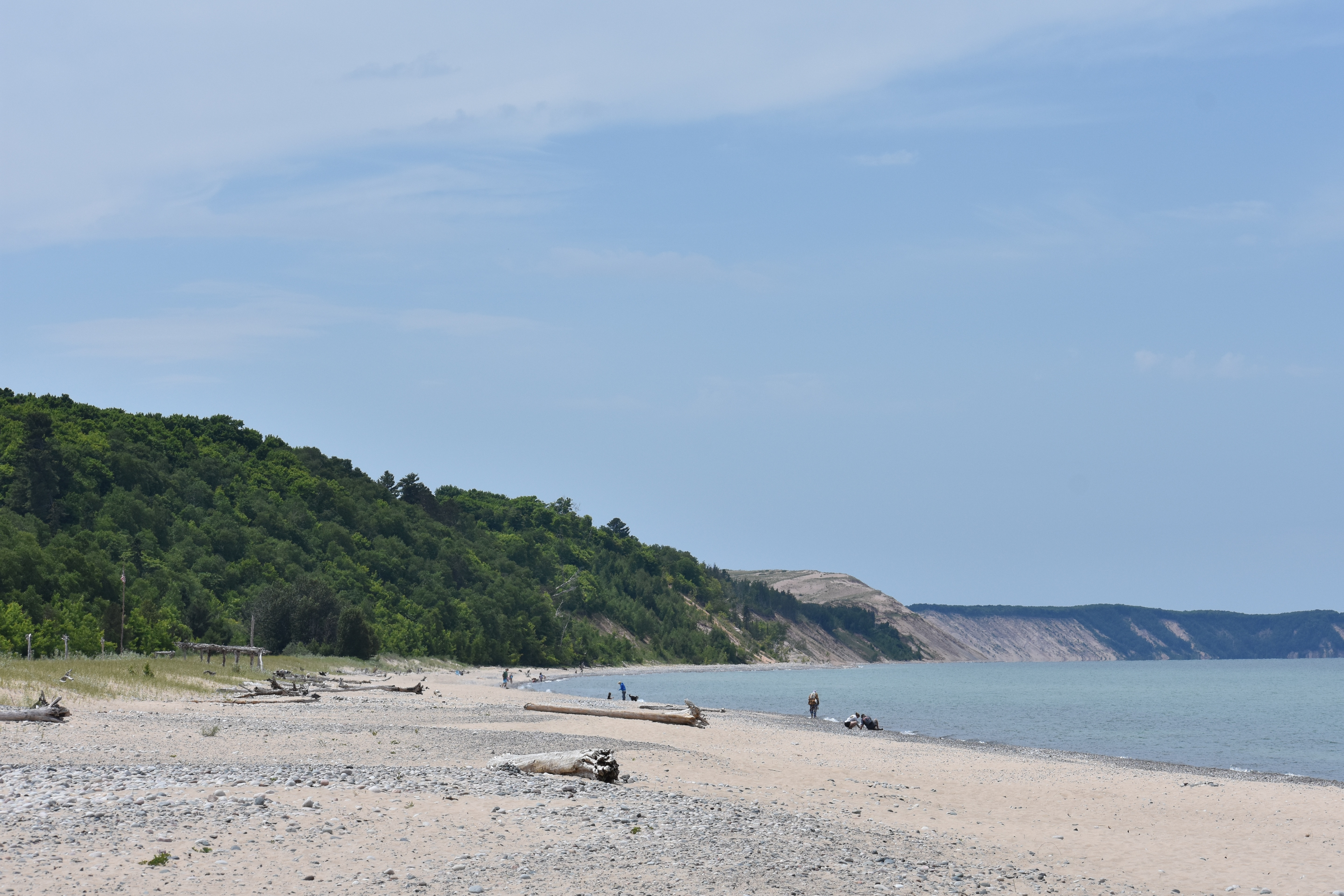
- Intersection of M-77 and H-58 Grand Marais Harbor of Refuge Inner and Outer Lights Agate Beach
- Motto: Eastern Gateway to Pictured Rocks National Lakeshores
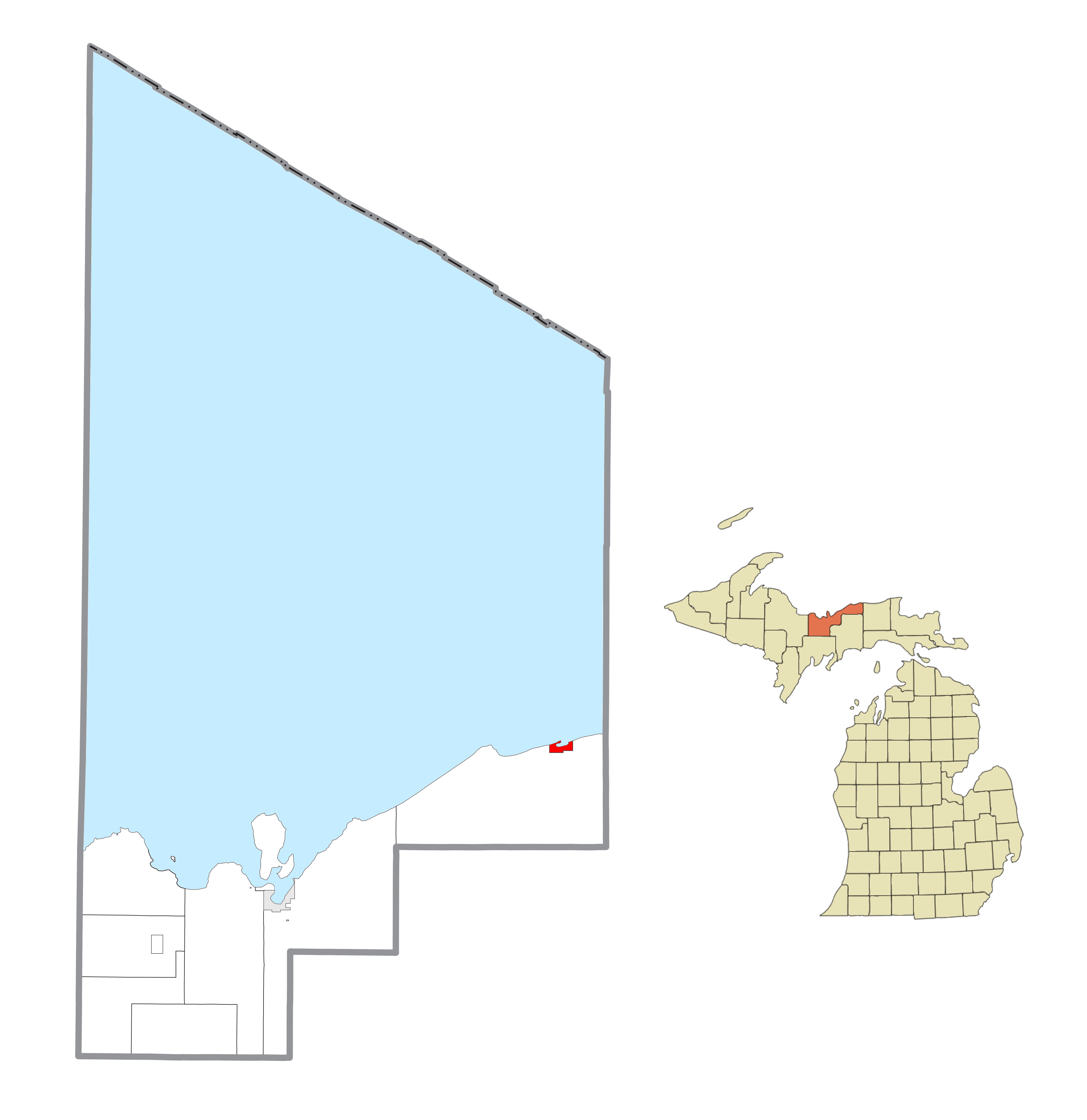
- Location within Alger County

- Location within the state of Michigan Location within the United States
- Coordinates: 46°40′19″N 85°58′28″W
- Country: United States
- State: Michigan
- County: Alger
- Township: Burt
- Established: 1882

Area
  - Total: 3.24 sq mi (8.39 km^{2})
  - Land: 1.89 sq mi (4.90 km^{2})
  - Water: 1.35 sq mi (3.49 km^{2})
- Elevation: 600 ft (180 m)

Population (2020)
  - Total: 234
  - Density: 123.6/sq mi (47.73/km^{2})
- Time zone: UTC-5 (Eastern (EST))
  - Summer (DST): UTC-4 (EDT)
- ZIP code(s): 49839
- Area code: 906
- FIPS code: 26-33440
- GNIS feature ID: 2804669
- Website: Chamber of Commerce

Grand Marais Informational Designation
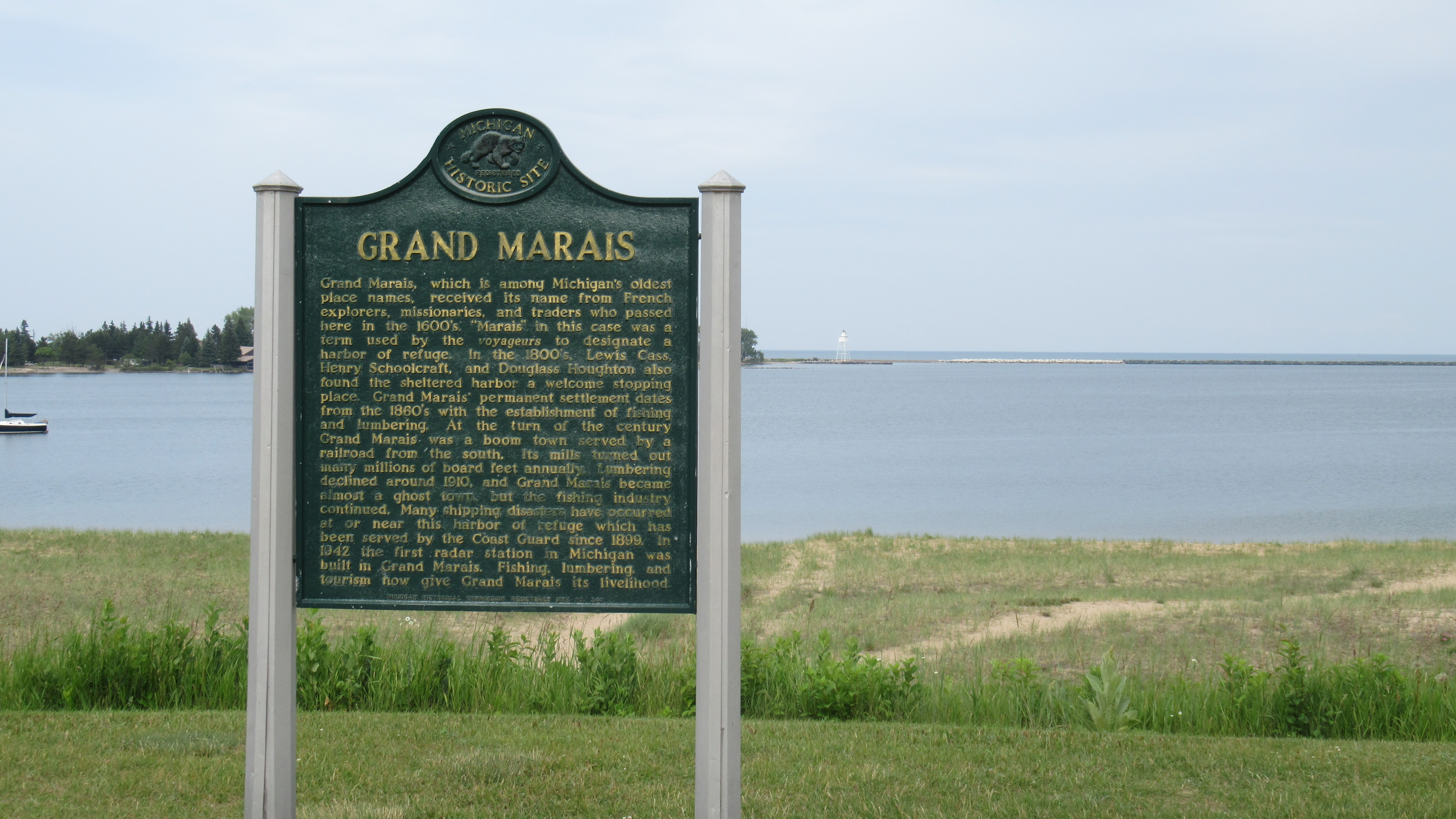
- Interactive map of Grand Marais; Informational Designation
- 46°40′15.6″N 85°58′59.8″W
- Location: Grand Marais, Michigan

History
- Built: 1882

Michigan State Historic Site
- Designated: August 14, 1962

Grand Marais (/ɡrændˈməˈreɪ/ grand mə-RAY) is an unincorporated community and census-designated place (CDP) in Alger County in the U.S. state of Michigan. It is located within Burt Township on the shores of Lake Superior, and the community is the eastern gateway to the Pictured Rocks National Lakeshore via H-58. As of the 2020 census, Grand Marais had a population of 234.

== History ==
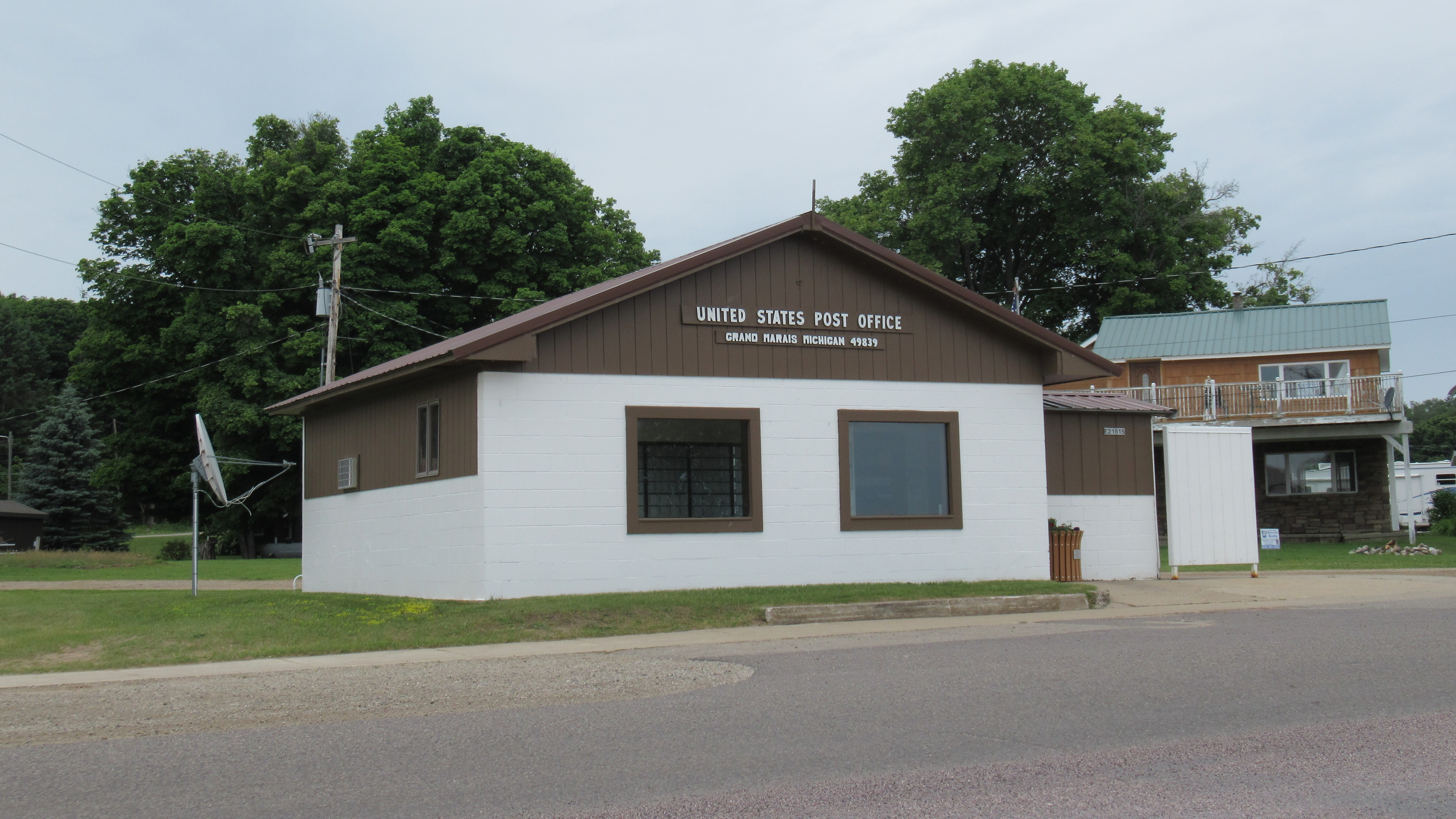
U.S. Post Office in Grand Marais

The name Grand Marais (French: great marsh) is a reference to the large, shallow harbor. French explorers and fur traders from the time of New France used the word "marais" to mean "harbor of refuge" as well as "marsh."

A breakwater was later built that extends from the bay into Lake Superior. The Grand Marais Outer Range Light is at its end, and the Fresnel lens is still operative. It is one of only 70 such lenses that remain operational in the United States; 16 of these are in use on the Great Lakes, eight of which are in Michigan. Many controversies in the little town relate to the costs of dredging and breakwall-repair operations to keep the harbor functioning. See Grand Marais Harbor of Refuge Inner and Outer Lights.

Grand Marais was one of five U.S. Life-Saving Service Stations established along the coast of Lake Superior between Munising and Whitefish Point in the Upper Peninsula of Michigan. It was part of the U.S. Life-Saving Service District 10 (later part of District 11). The other four Life-saving Stations were Deer Park, Two Heart, Crisp Point Light, and Vermilion Point. In 1915, these stations became part of the U.S. Coast Guard. In 1939 the U.S. Lighthouse Service also merged under the control of the U.S. Coast Guard.

The community was home to the Grand Marais Air Force Station from 1954 to 1957. The station was part of the Air Defense Command, and provided general surveillance radar along the northern frontier of the United States.

=== We Hear You America contest ===
Grand Marais, with a population of about 300, gained national attention early in 2011 when it became the leader in a national contest sponsored by Reader's Digest. Visitors to the We Hear You America web site had the opportunity to "cheer" for any community in order to win recognition and cash prizes. Grand Marais' harbor was officially deemed a Harbor of Refuge because it was the only lifeline a sailor had along the dangerous shipwreck coast of Lake Superior. Years of neglect had caused deterioration of its harbor breakwall, allowing sand to fill in, but the cost to repair it seemed prohibitive. Grand Marais attained 1,281,724 "cheers" and won the top municipal first prize of $40,000 in the contest, as well as notoriety for its plight in a Reader's Digest article.

== Geography ==
Grand Marais is the northern terminus of M-77. Seney and the Seney National Wildlife Refuge are to the south.

== Demographics ==
Historical population
Census	Pop.	Note	%±
2020	234		—
U.S. Decennial Census

As of 2020, its population was 234.

== Arts and culture ==
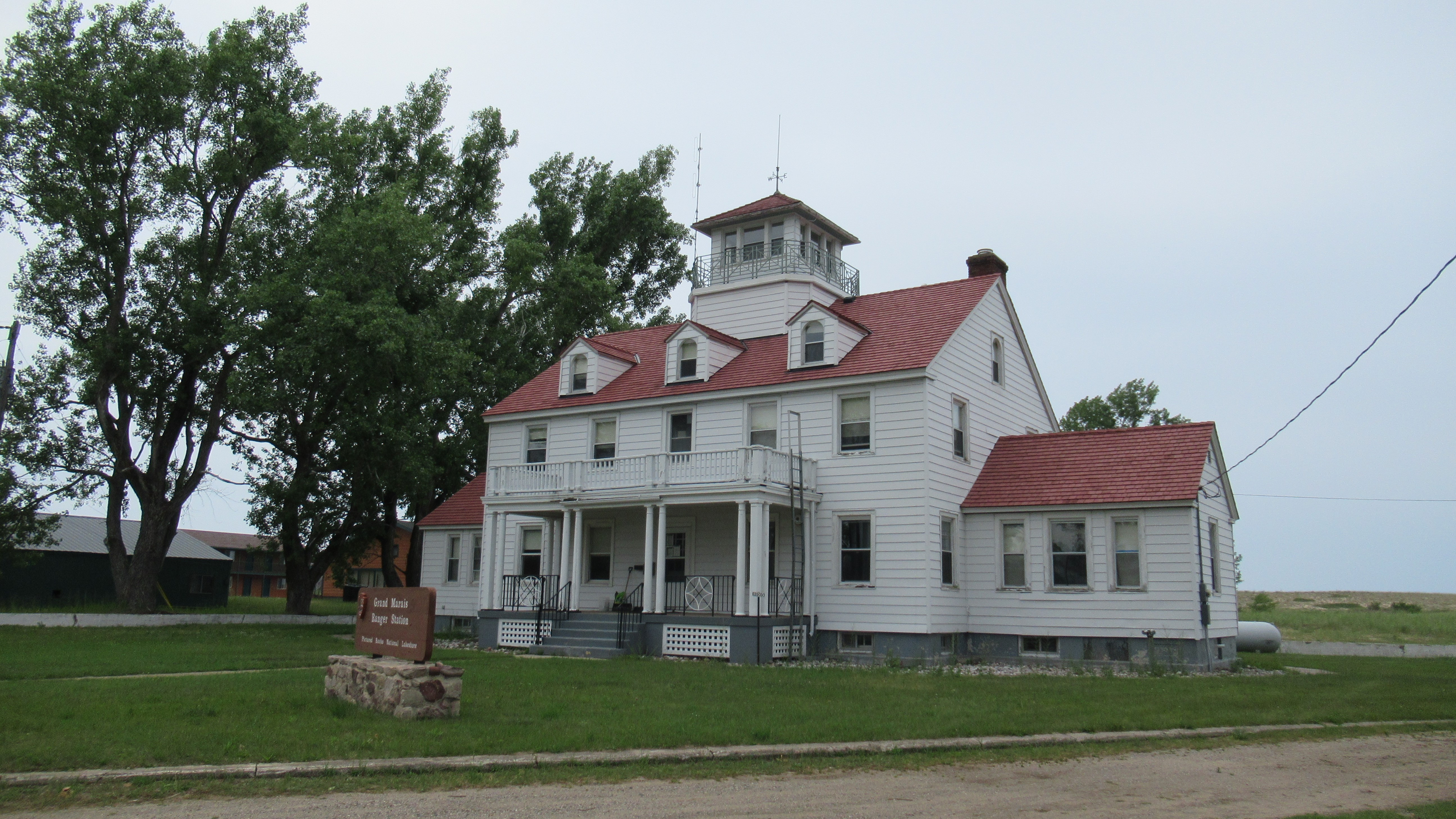
Former Grand Marais Life-Saving Station, now serving as a Ranger Station

Grand Marais is a four-season tourist destination. Snowmobiling is popular in the winter, and swimming, hiking, boating, kayaking, agate collecting on the beach and fishing are among the summer activities.

Points of interest and events include:

- The former United States Coast Guard Life-Saving Station, which now serves as a ranger station. The Coast Guard radio operator here had the last communication with the SS Edmund Fitzgerald before she sank during a storm in 1975, with all hands lost. The former keeper's quarters of the station were adapted to house the Grand Marais Maritime Museum.
- The Pickle Barrel House Museum (1926).
- The Au Sable Light, which is listed on the National Register of Historic Places.
- Muskallonge Lake State Park.
- Sable Falls, west of Grand Marais.
- The Gitche Gumee Agate and History Museum.
- The Lake Superior Brewing Company operates a brewery and pub at Grand Marais.
- In mid June, the harbor at Grand Marais is the site of the annual sea plane fly-in, hosted by the Grand Marais Pilots Association on behalf of the National Seaplane Pilots Association.
- In mid July, the Great Lakes Sea Kayak Symposium is held at the harbor. This multi-day event attracts sea kayakers from around the country. It is billed as "the largest and oldest sea kayaking symposium on the Great Lakes."
- During the second weekend of August the town of Grand Marais hosts a music and arts festival, showcasing folk and rock music as well as local art.

The Michigan-born writer Jim Harrison (1937–2016) had a cabin in Grand Marais where he would come to relax and write.

== Education ==
Burt Township Schools is the local school district.

== Transportation ==
=== Highways ===
- M-77 has its northern terminus in the community just north of the intersection with H-58.
- H-58 is a county-designated highway that runs east–west through the community.

=== Airport ===
- Grand Marais Airport is a general aviation airport.

== See also ==
- List of lifesaving stations in Michigan
