= Ira W. Jayne =

American judge

Former Detroit circuit judge Ira Waite Jayne at his Fenton MI farm.

Ira Waite Jayne (1882-1961) was elected to the Wayne County, Michigan Circuit Court bench in 1915 and served as Chief Judge for 27 years of his 37 years working for the court. He graduated from the University of Michigan in 1905 and from the Detroit College of Law. He was the attorney for The Society for Prevention of Cruelty to Children in Detroit. He developed the boarding home plan replacing orphanages.

Born in Fenton, Genesee County, Mich., June 16, 1882. Son of Daniel G. Jayne and Alice (Waite) Jayne; married 1911 to Jean Bilton. Republican. Law professor; circuit judge in Michigan 3rd Circuit, 1919–56; defeated, 1917; resigned 1956; delegate to Republican National Convention from Michigan, 1920; Presidential Elector for Michigan, 1928. Member, American Bar Association; NAACP; Sons of the American Revolution; Freemasons; Elks; Foresters; Odd Fellows.

He was a member of Adelphi at the University of Michigan. While at Michigan he earned varsity letters in baseball, football and track. This led to a brief stint as a semi-professional pitcher in the Ohio Valley Baseball League. Ira W. Jayne was school superintendent of the Burt Township Schools at the turn of the 20th century.

He was instrumental in championing public parks for Detroit's burgeoning population. In 1915, Mayor Oscar Marx appointed him as Detroit’s first recreation commissioner. When city council balked at opening a park, he cordoned off the streets and made one himself. This act of civil disobedience become a watchword for later campaigns – "He got things done."

Secretary of War Newton D. Baker appointed the judge to the recreational activities duty for United States Army camps in 1917 during World War I. There is a park which bears his name in Detroit.

He was a trustee of Lapeer's Camp Lemberg for retarded children, national Vice President of the NAACP and the American Bar Association Chairman.

As Vice President of the National Lawyers Guild, when members of the Detroit chapter refused to take a non-communist oath, Jayne resigned his post.

Judge Jayne also ran for the US Senate seat vacated in 1928 when Senator Woodbridge N Ferris died.

Upon becoming Chief Judge of the Wayne County Circuit Court, he made national news by helping to eliminate a four-year docket backlog by bringing in visiting judges. He served as Chief Judge for 27 years. In 1951, he brought an end to a 59-day strike by Detroit streetcar and bus drivers. He upheld the legality of the public employee antistrike law but held the City of Detroit responsible for the strike. He opined that the mayor's office ignored the early willingness by organized labor to meet and confer to work out bargaining issues.

As Chief Judge he helped found the "Friend of the Court" system for domestic matters.

Along with Walter P. Reuther he chose the sculpture, Carl Milles's statue "The Hand of God", which stands to pay tribute to Frank Murphy outside the Frank Murphy Hall of Justice in downtown Detroit.

A summary of his career appears in Recreation, Volume 12 by National Recreation Association.

He wrote numerous articles which remain on record to this day.

Judge Jayne was born in Fenton, Michigan and Fenton's Jayne Road is named for him as are the two Jayne Hill subdivisions which were built on his former farm.

== See also ==
- Wayne County Building
