= The Teenie Weenies =

American comic strip by William Donahey

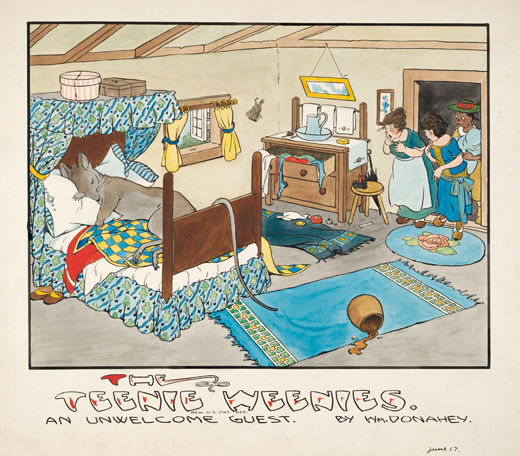
- The Teenie Weenies drawn by William Donahey 1916
- Author: William Donahey
- Current status/schedule: Concluded
- Launch date: (1st run) June 14, 1914 (2nd run) September 24, 1933 (3rd run) May 18, 1941
- End date: (1st run) October 26, 1924 (2nd run) December 2, 1934 (3rd run) February 15, 1970
- Publisher: Chicago Tribune Syndicate

The Teenie Weenies is a comic strip created and illustrated by William Donahey (19 October 1883 – 2 February 1970). It first appeared in 1914 in the Chicago Tribune and ran for over 50 years. It consisted of normal-size objects intermingled with tiny protagonists. The comic strip characters were two inches tall and lived under a rose bush. They lived with "real world" size materials made from discarded objects like hats, jars, barrels, kegs, and boxes – all of which were gigantic to them.

== History ==
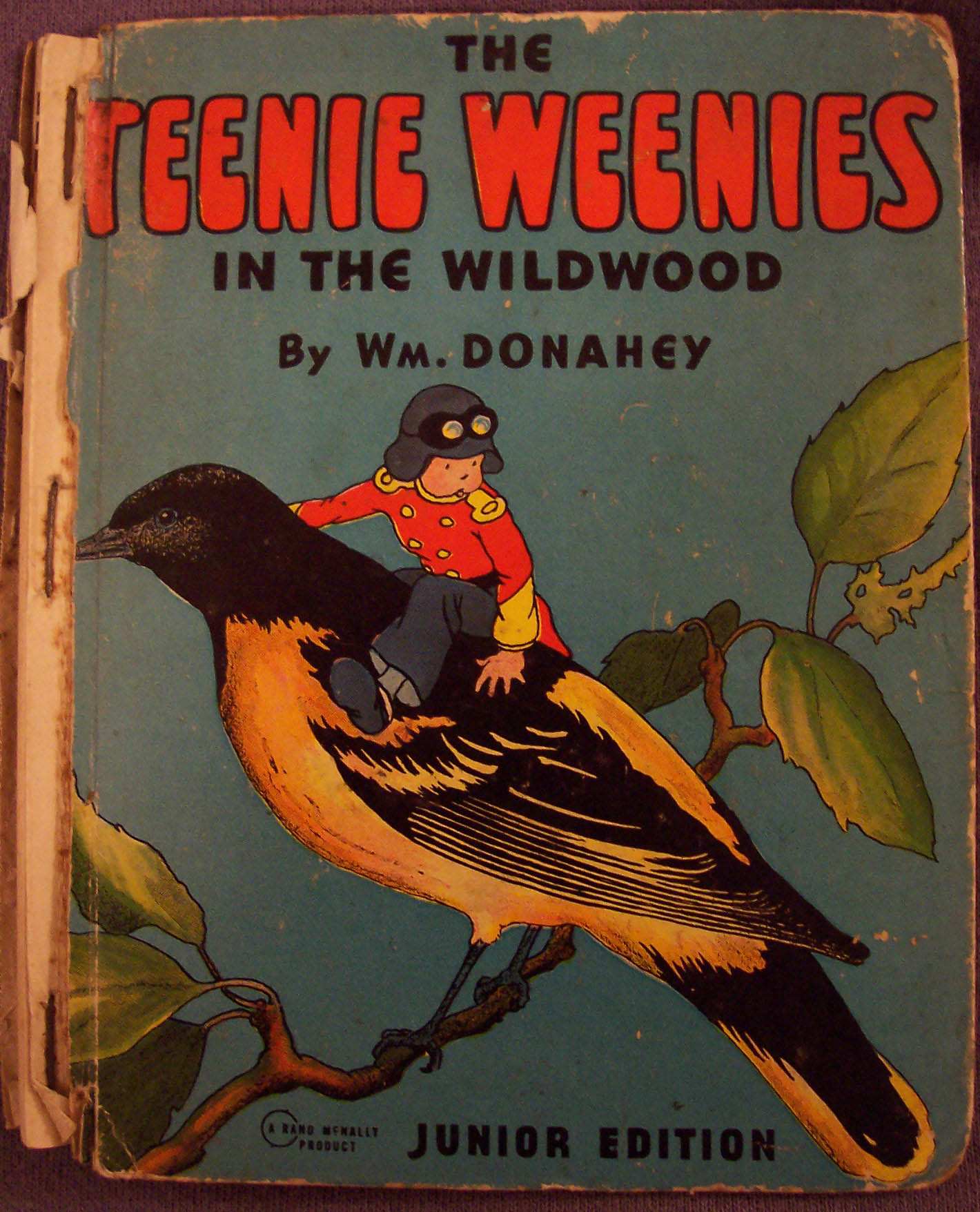
The Teenie Weenies in the Wildwood by William Donahey, 1923

The strip was inspired by Palmer Cox's The Brownies and was done in the form of text with a single large picture. Unlike the Brownies where the text was written in verse, Donahey wrote in prose. The Teenie Weenies first appeared in black and white in the women's section of the Chicago Tribune on June 14, 1914. This first story was of the Top Hat house burning down. The comic strip ran as a one panel story with a picture until 1923. It then moved to the comics page as a strip cartoon. Color versions soon appeared in the magazine section of the newspaper printed in rotogravure.

Donahey drew the comic strip until October 26, 1924, when it was temporarily discontinued. While the newspaper feature was stopped, Donahey's comic characters were used in advertising for Reid, Murdock & Company. Donahey did advertising for them in The Saturday Evening Post and on their Monarch canned foods line.

Several books of the strip comic characters were also published by Beckley-Cardey Company and Reilly & Lee. In an effort to stimulate new interest in the Teenie Weenies, Reid, Murdock & Company in 1927 issued an eight-page pamphlet called The Teenie Weenies: Their Book. On September 24, 1933, the daily comic strip was added again to the Chicago Tribune newspaper. It ran for about a year until it was suspended again on December 2, 1934.

In 1940 and 1941 four of The Teenie Weenies books were reprinted. On May 18, 1941, the Sunday comic strip feature came back permanently. It continued until Donahey's death. During this third time that it was published, two sets of reprints came out. Whittlesy House published three books between 1942 and 1945. Ziff-Davis published two standard-size comic books in 1950 and 1951. Donahey retired in 1969. The last newspaper comic strip episode appeared February 15, 1970. Donahey died February 2 of the same year and never saw the last episode published.

== Characters ==
Donahey's comic strip characters tended to be named after their most prominent characteristics, examples being the Sailor, the Chinese man, the Cook, the Policeman, the Lady of Fashion, the Dunce, the Old Soldier with a Wooden Leg, etc. Each character had a personality accordingly which was not just based on their clothing. According to John D. Taylor (1946-2009), a founding member of the Kansas City Science Fiction and Fantasy Society, there were 45 members of the Teenie Weenie village. Below is Taylor's list of the Teenie Weenies.

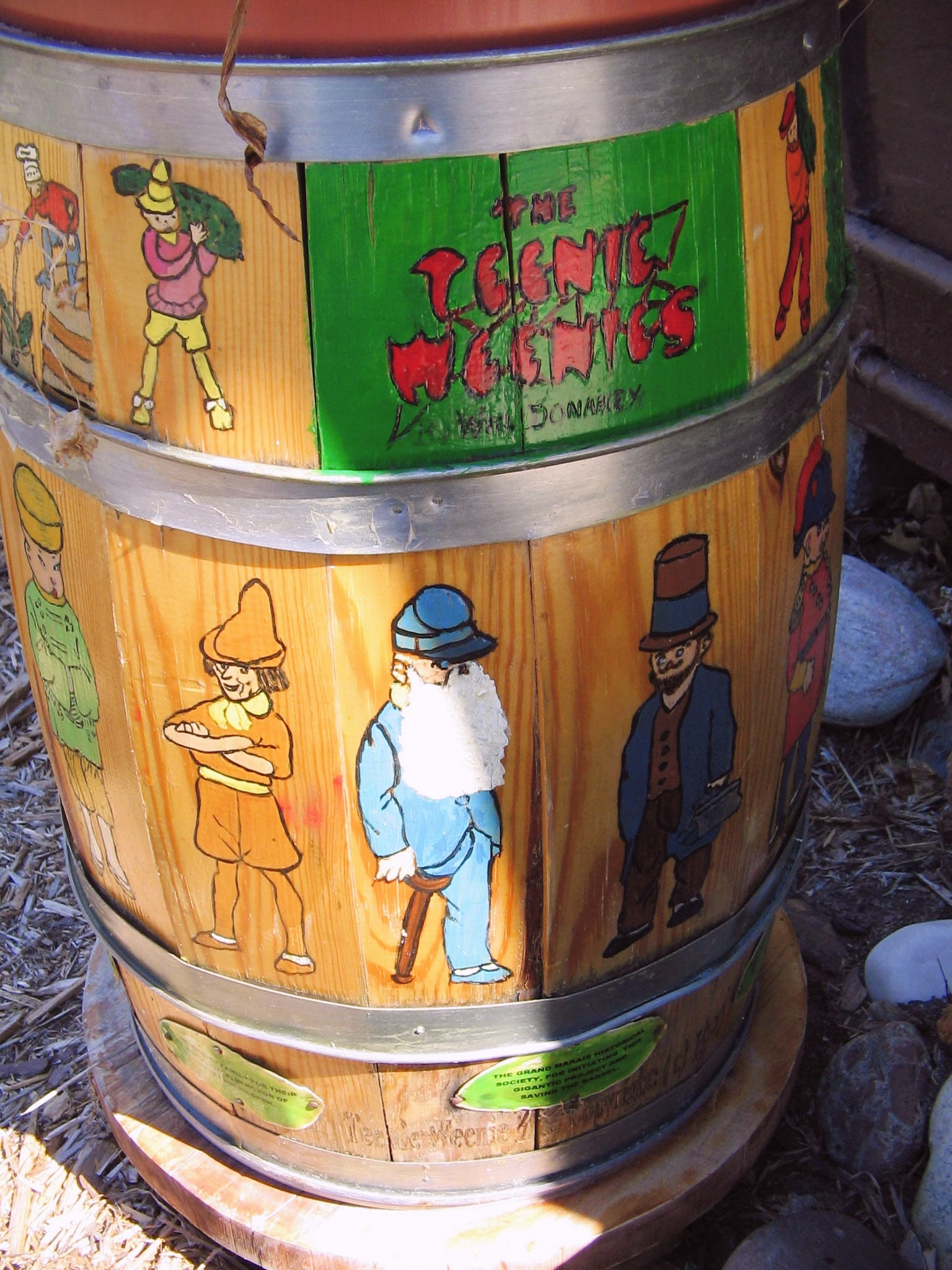

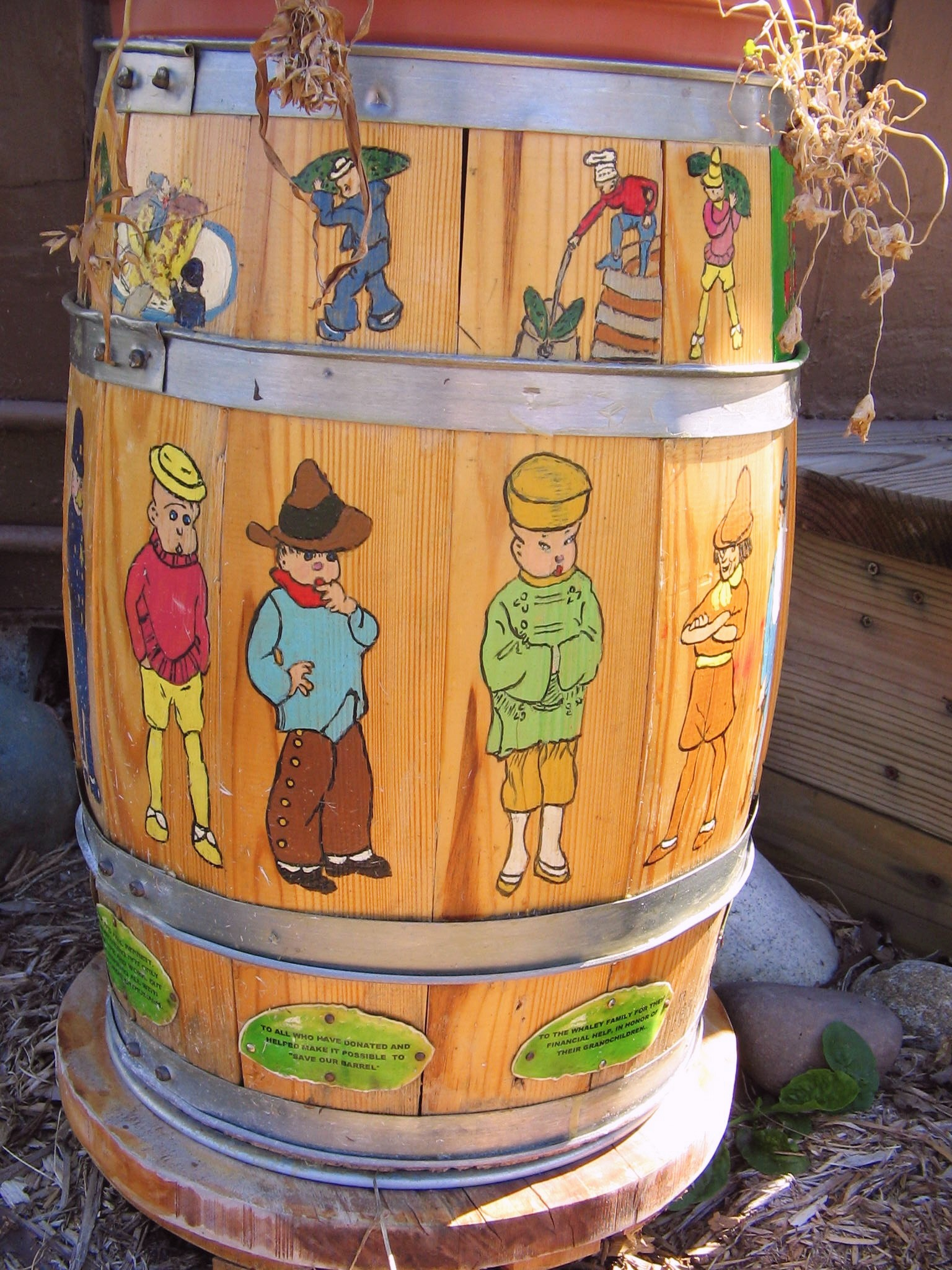

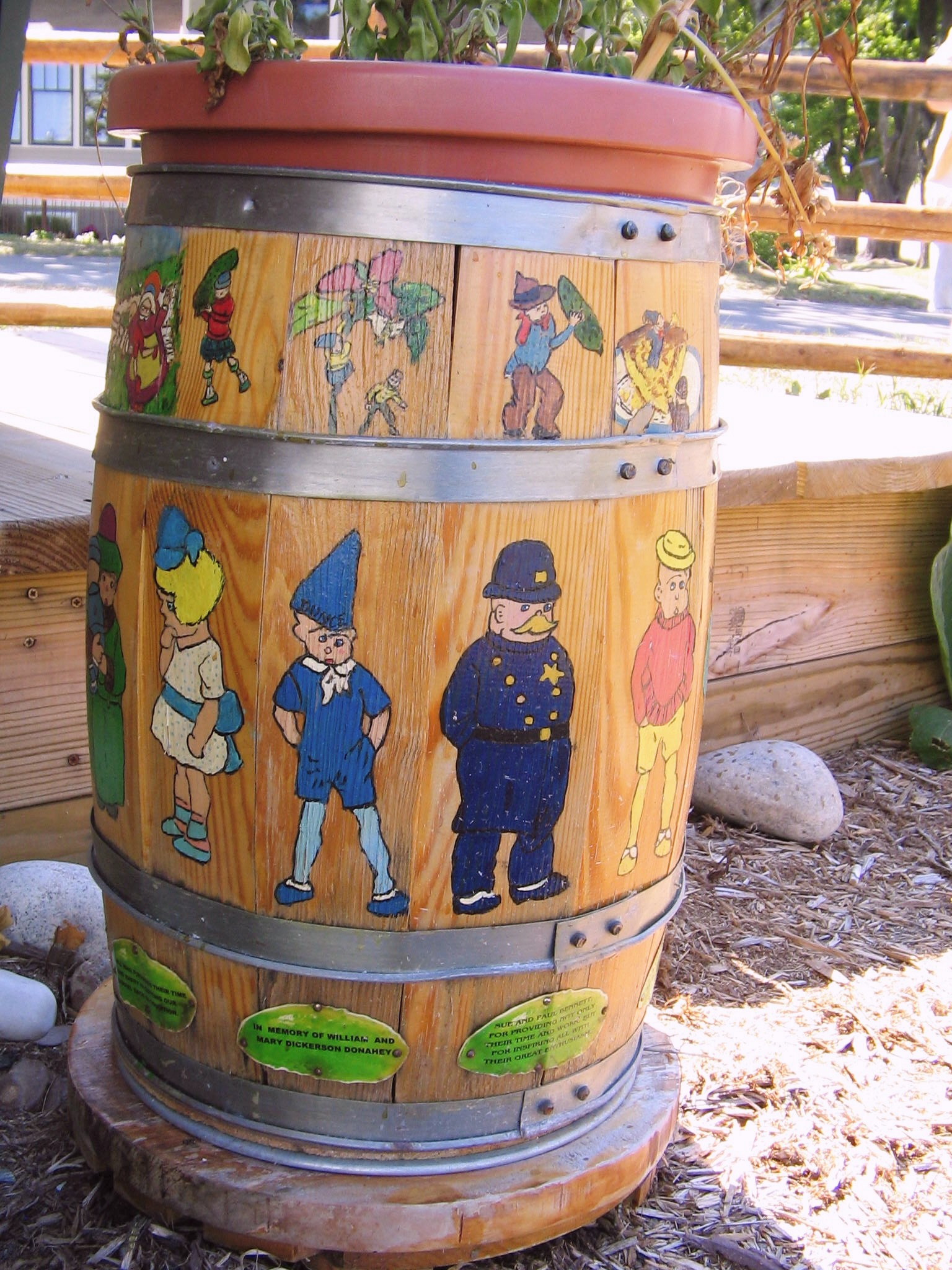

1. Aunt Tess: 6/18/1961 - 1970. White-haired workaholic and domineering old bat. Not to be confused with Tess (Bone / Guff / Turk).

--. the babies' mother: see "Tess (Bone / Guff / Turk)".

2. Bell, Baby Bell: 8/1/15. One shot appearance as the subject of a poem: "Cry cry cry, Baby Bell. Went to sleep in a peanut shell."

3. Buddy Guff: veteran of the Great War. Married Tess Bone, father of Dot. 1918(?)-1924.

4. the Carpenter: 1914-1915(?)

5. the Chinese man: 1915(?)-1970. Oriental laundryman. Also called Chuck Lee. And once called Henry.

--. Chuck Lee: see "the Chinese Man".

6. the Clown: 1914–1924. (In one strip he is referred to as "Nipper".)

7. the Cook: 1914–1970.

8. the Cowboy: 1914–1970.

--. Danny Dunce: see "the Dunce."

9. the Doctor: 1914–1970.

10. the dog: 1914-1917(?).

11. Dorothy (Dot) Guff: born 3/11/1923. Not seen after 1924.

12. the Dunce: 1914–1970. (Note: in one strip he is called "Danny Dunce")

13. the Dutchman: 1914-1918(?).

--. the Fire Department: 1914. Like the Army, an unnamed band later replaced by individual Teenie Weenies.

14. the General: 1914–1970. Leader of the little village.

--. the Giant: see "Paddy Pinn."

15. Gogo: 1916(?)-1924, 1941–1970. The Teenie Weenie "colored man."

16, 17. the Guff sisters: 1918(?)-1921(?). Two unnamed (to the best of my knowledge) young women.

--. Guffs: see "Buddy Guff," "Guff sisters", "Miss Guff", "Sally Guff.", and "Tess (Bone / Guff / Turk)".

18. Grandma(s): 10/25/1914. In the strip Donahey refers to "one of the Teenie Weenie grandmas." They are never otherwise referenced.

19. Grandpa(s). 1914–1924. In the earliest strips there are at least two Grandpas, but later only one. Teenie Weenie Town (1942) mentions "a Teenie Weenie grandpa", but there is no picture, and he does not have an important role.

--. Henry: there is no Teenie Weenie named "Henry". The editor of Harvey Magazine # 7 renamed the Chinese man "Henry".

20. the Indian: 1914–1924, 1941–1970.

21. the Jap: 1914. Only appeared in five strips.

22. Jerry Lover: 4/2/1916-1924. Son of Mr. and Mrs. Lover, twin of Tom Lover.

23. Judy Turk: 7/31/1966-1970. Daughter of the Turk and Mrs. Turk, the last Teenie Weenie.

24. the Lady of Fashion: 1914–1970. At first vain and interested only in clothes, she became the village school-mistress, nurse, etiquette supervisor, and housekeeper.

--. the Lover. see "Mr. Lover."

25. Miss Guff: 1918(?)-1921(?). Oldest of the four Guff sisters, a prim and proper spinster.

26. Miss Jackson: 3/25/1923-1924. "Colored" nursemaid, full name Capatola Victrola Pinchneck Jackson.

27: the Minister: 6/20/1915. Seen only at the wedding of the Lover and the Sweetheart (Mr. and Mrs. Lover).

28. Mooie: 1917, 1923, and Wildwood. Queen of the Saboes.

29. Mr. Lover: 1914–1924. Originally the Lover until his wedding in 1915.

--. Mr. Turk: see "the Turk."

30. Mrs. Lover: 1914–1924. Originally the Sweetheart until her wedding in 1915.

--. Mrs. Turk: see "Tess (Bone, Guff, Turk)"

31. Nipper: 1941(?)-1970. Not named at first, later determined to be the son of Tess and the Turk. Brother of Zero and Judy. (Nipper is also the given name of the Clown (q.v.) and the name of a pinching bug of the 1940s that predated naming the boys.)

32. the Old Soldier with a Wooden Leg: 1914–1970. Civil War veteran.

33. Paddy Pinn: 1917(?)-1923. At 4 inches tall, the Teenie Weenie Giant.

34. the Poet: 1917(?)-1924. Also known as Rufus Rhyme.

35. the Policeman: 1914–1970.

--. the Professor(?): 1914. Wearing a mortarboard and spectacles, never named but quite prominent in the earliest strips..

--. Rufus Rhyme: see "the Poet."

--. the Saboes: 1917, 1923. A savage tribe of "Wild Men" living near the Teenie Weenies (in Michigan?)

36. the Sailor: 1914–1970.

--. the Sailor's wife: see "Sally Guff"

37. Sally Guff: 1918(?)-1924(?). Married the Sailor in an advertisement in 1926. Referred to as "The Sailor's Wife" on a deck of trading cards in 1928.

??. Santa: 12/23/1945. The Christmas symbol, as a Teenie Weenie, was actually the cut-out, which means he was a Teenie Weenie, even if he's not, really. Jack Frost, the Easter Bunny and Father Time also made appearances in dreams or tales told by the elders, but cannot really be counted.

38. the Scotchman: 10/25/1914-1924.

39. Snip: 1934. Baby. (Snip is also the name of the baby in Donahey's other comic strip, The Pixeys.)

--. the Soldier. The 1/1/1945 cut-out (who doesn't appear in the story) is "Teenie Weenie Soldier", carrying a gun and wearing a uniform similar to the General's. In the 5/19/46 strip the Dunce and Gogo are on guard wearing the same uniforms, and the Dunce in uniform is the cut-out. There is no Teenie Weenie Soldier (except for the Old Soldier with a Wooden Leg) per se after 1914, see "the Army."

--. the Sweetheart. See "Mrs. Lover."

40. Tess (Bone, Guff, Turk): 1916(?)-1970. Married Buddy Guff in 1918, one daughter, Dorothy. Not named in the 1933 incarnation, but there is an unnamed matron, the mother of Snip. Reappeared in 1941, unnamed for quite a while, eventually identified as Tess and as "the babies' mother" (Nipper and Zero), even later identified as the wife of the Turk. Called "Mrs. Turk" exclusively after the advent of Aunt Tess. Daughter Judy born 7/31/1966.

41. Tom Lover: 04/02/1916-1924. Son of Mr. and Mrs. Lover, twin of Jerry Lover.

42. Tommy Atkins: 1914. Only seen in four of the first five strips. Dressed as a bellhop.

43. the Turk: 1914–1970.

--. the Wild Man: see "Zip".

--. the Witch: 1923, 1924. Not a true Teenie Weenie, rather an illustration of a Halloween song in Teenie Weenie Land, and a top-of-page illustration (riding a bat) in the 10/26/24 strip.

44. Zero: 1942(?)-1970. Teenie Weenie baby. Not named at first, later determined to be the son of Tess and the Turk. Brother of Nipper and Judy.

45. Zip: 1917(?)-1924. The Teenie Weenie "Wild Man", a converted Sabo.

== Bibliography ==
- The Teenie Weenies (Reilly & Britton, 1916).
- Teenie Weenie Days (Whittlesey House, 1944).
- Teenie Weenie Town (Whittlesey House, 1942).
- Alice and the Teenie Weenies (Reilly & Lee, 1927).
- Teenie Weenie Neighbors (Whittlesey House, 1945).
- Adventures of the Teenie Weenies (Reilly & Lee, 1920).
- The Teenie Weenies in the Wildwood (Reilly & Lee, 1923).
- Down the River with the Teenie Weenies (Reilly & Lee, 1921).
- The Teenie Weenies under the Rosebush (Reilly & Lee, 1922).
- The Teenie Weenies with Effie E. Baker (Beckley-Cardy Company, 1917).
- Teenie Weenie Land with Effie E. Baker (Beckley-Cardy Company, 1923).

"The Teenie Weenies: Their Book" 8 page pamphlet [Reid-Murdock & Company, 1927] "The Teenie weenies: Their Book" 20 pages [Reid Murdock & Company, 1926]

== See also ==
- The Borrowers, 1952–1982 novels for children

== Sources ==
- Cahn, Joseph M., The Teenie Weenies Book: the Life and Art of William Donahey (Green Tiger Press, 1986). ISBN 0-88138-035-0
