= Grand Marais Airport =

Public use airport in Grand Marais, Michigan

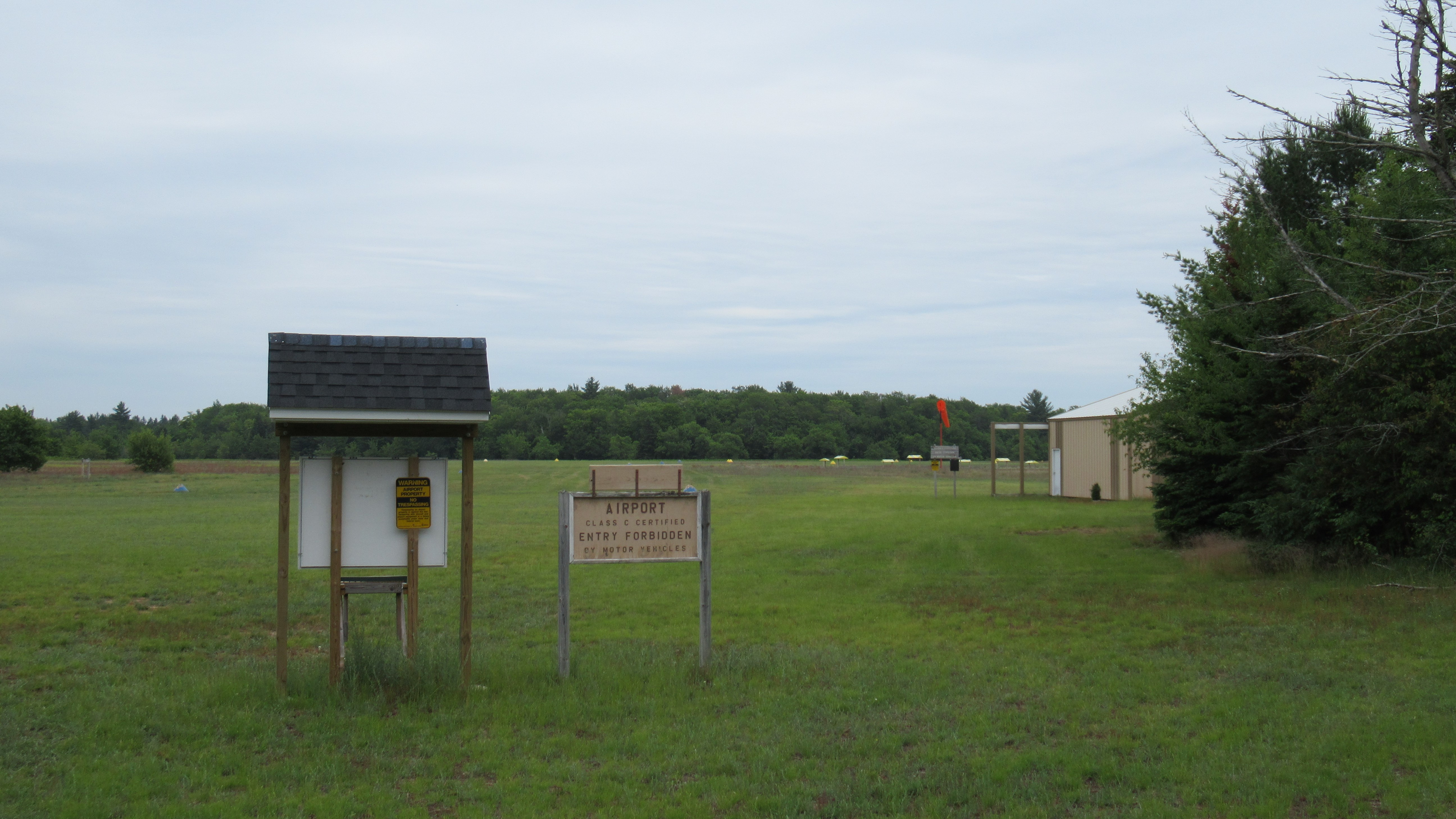
- View of the main entrance and runway
- IATA: none; ICAO: none; FAA LID: Y98

Summary
- Airport type: Public
- Owner: Burt Township
- Serves: Grand Marais, Michigan
- Time zone: UTC−06:00 (-6)
  - Summer (DST): UTC−05:00 (-5)
- Elevation AMSL: 838 ft (255 m)
- Coordinates: 46°37′15″N 085°55′08″W

Map
- Location of airport in Michigan Y98 (the United States)

Runways
Direction	Length		Surface
Direction	ft	m	Surface
14/32	2,800	853	Turf
5/23	2,600	792	Turf

Statistics (2022)
- Aircraft operations: 75
- Based aircraft: 1
- Source: Federal Aviation Administration

Grand Marais Airport (FAA LID: Y98) is a public use airport located three nautical miles (6 km) southeast of the central business district of Grand Marais, a community in Burt Township, Alger County, Michigan, United States. The airport is owned by Burt Township.

== Facilities and aircraft ==
Grand Marais Airport covers an area of 160 acres (65 ha) at an elevation of 838 feet (255 m) above mean sea level. It has two runways with turf surfaces: runway 5/23 measures 2,600 by 150 feet (792 x 46 m) and runway 14/32 measures 2,800 by 100 feet (853 x 30 m).

For the 12-month period ending December 31, 2022, the airport had 75 general aviation aircraft operations, an average of just over 6 per month. For the same time period, there was 1 aircraft based at this airport, a single-engine airplane.

The airport does not have a fixed-base operator, and there is no fuel available.

== Events ==
In mid June, the neighboring harbor at Grand Marais is the site for an annual sea plane fly-in hosted by the Grand Marais Pilots Association on behalf of the National Seaplane Pilots Association.

== See also ==
- List of airports in Michigan
