= Grand Marais Harbor of Refuge Inner and Outer Lights =

Lighthouses in Michigan, United States

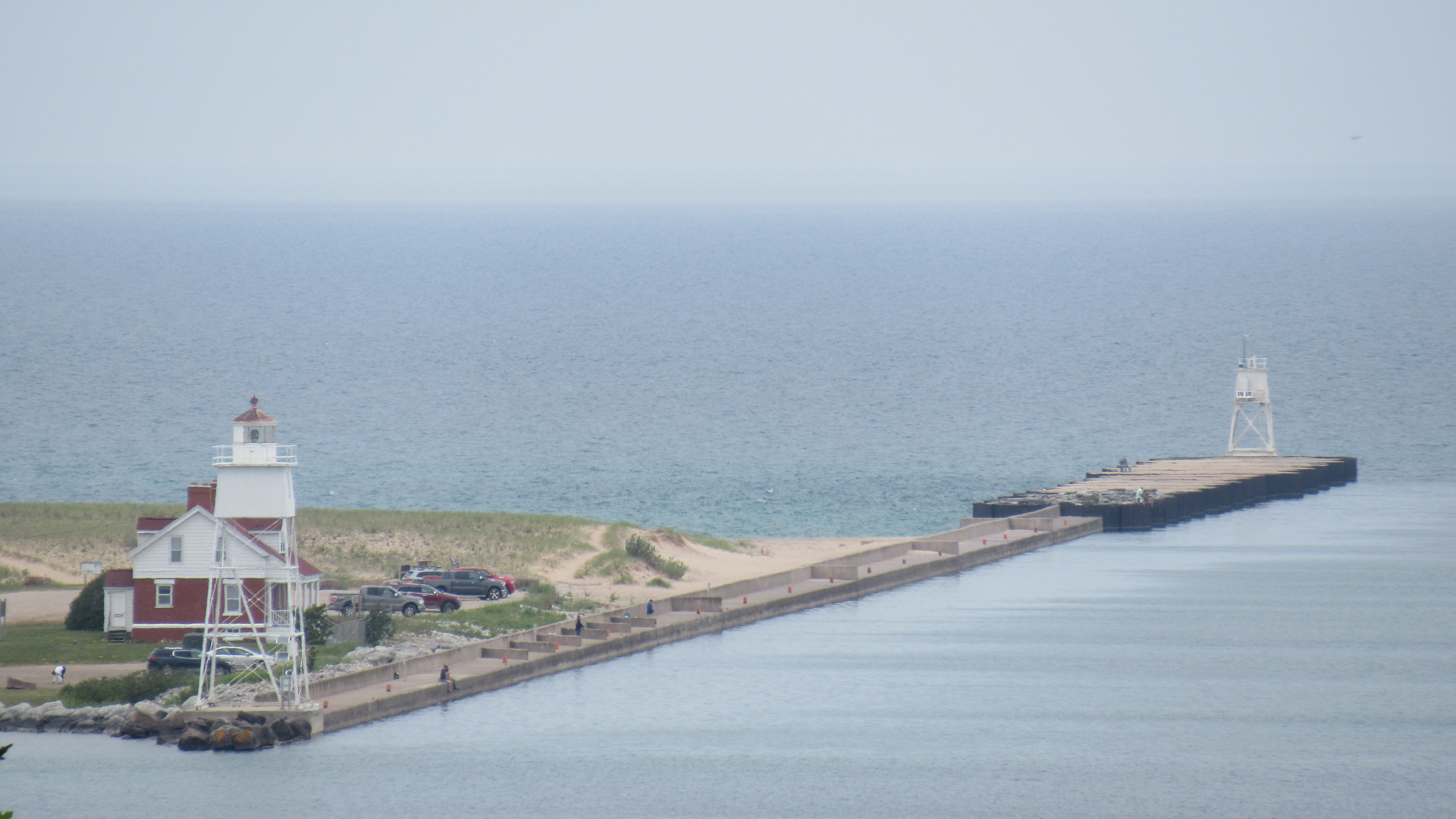
- View of both lighthouses and keeper's house
- Location: Grand Marais, Alger County, United States
- Coordinates: 46°41′01″N 85°58′19″W

Tower
- Constructed: 1895
- Construction: concrete (pier)
- Heritage: National Register of Historic Places listed place
- Grand Marais Harbor of Refuge Inner and Outer Lights
- U.S. National Register of Historic Places
- Area: less than one acre
- MPS: Light Stations of the United States MPS
- NRHP reference No.: 12000254
- Added to NRHP: May 2, 2012
- Inner light
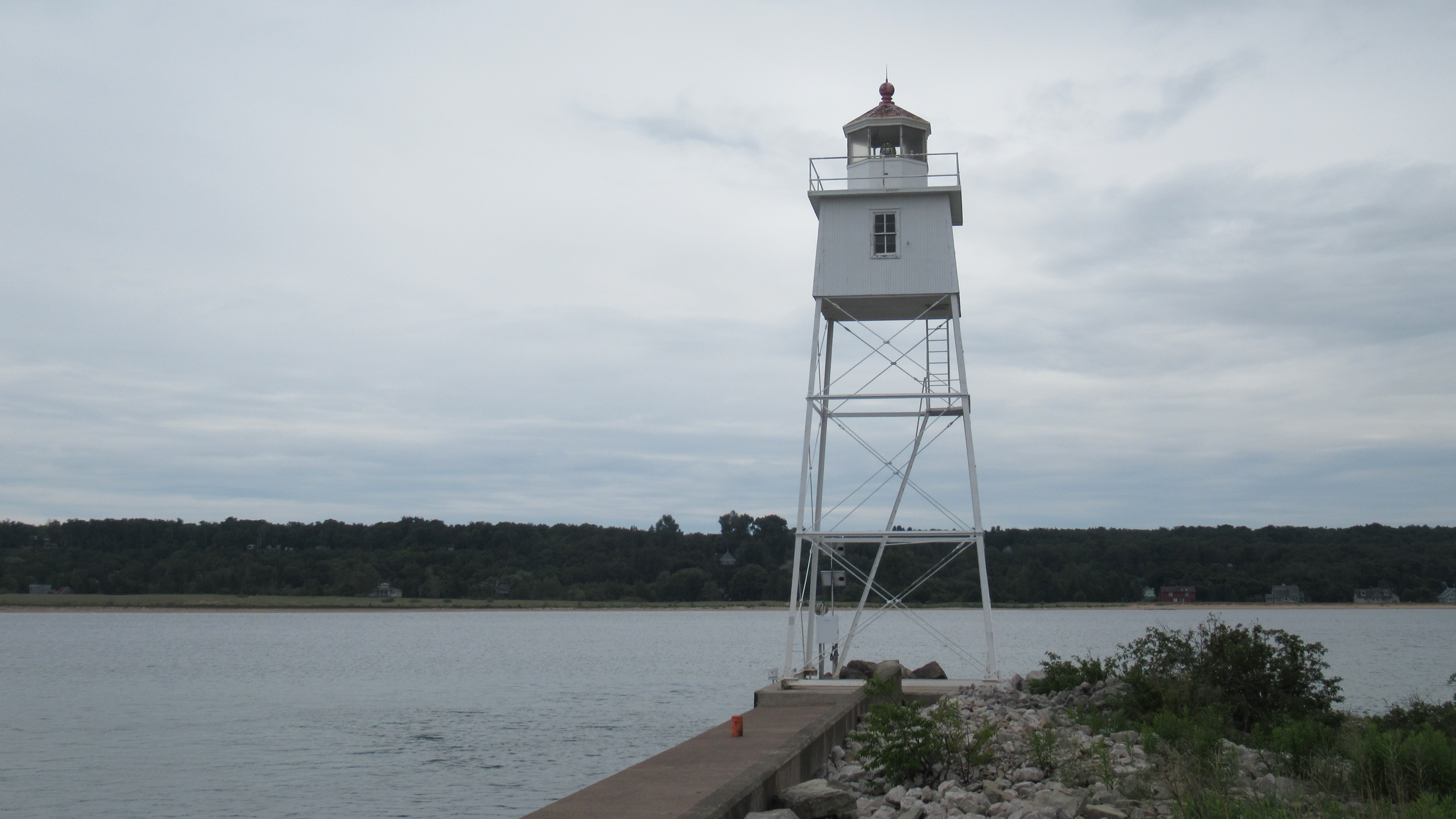
- Construction: cast iron (tower)
- Height: 55 ft (17 m)
- Shape: skeletal
- First lit: 1895
- Focal height: 53 ft (16 m)
- Lens: fifth order Fresnel lens
- Range: 16 mi (26 km)
- Characteristic: F W
- Outer light
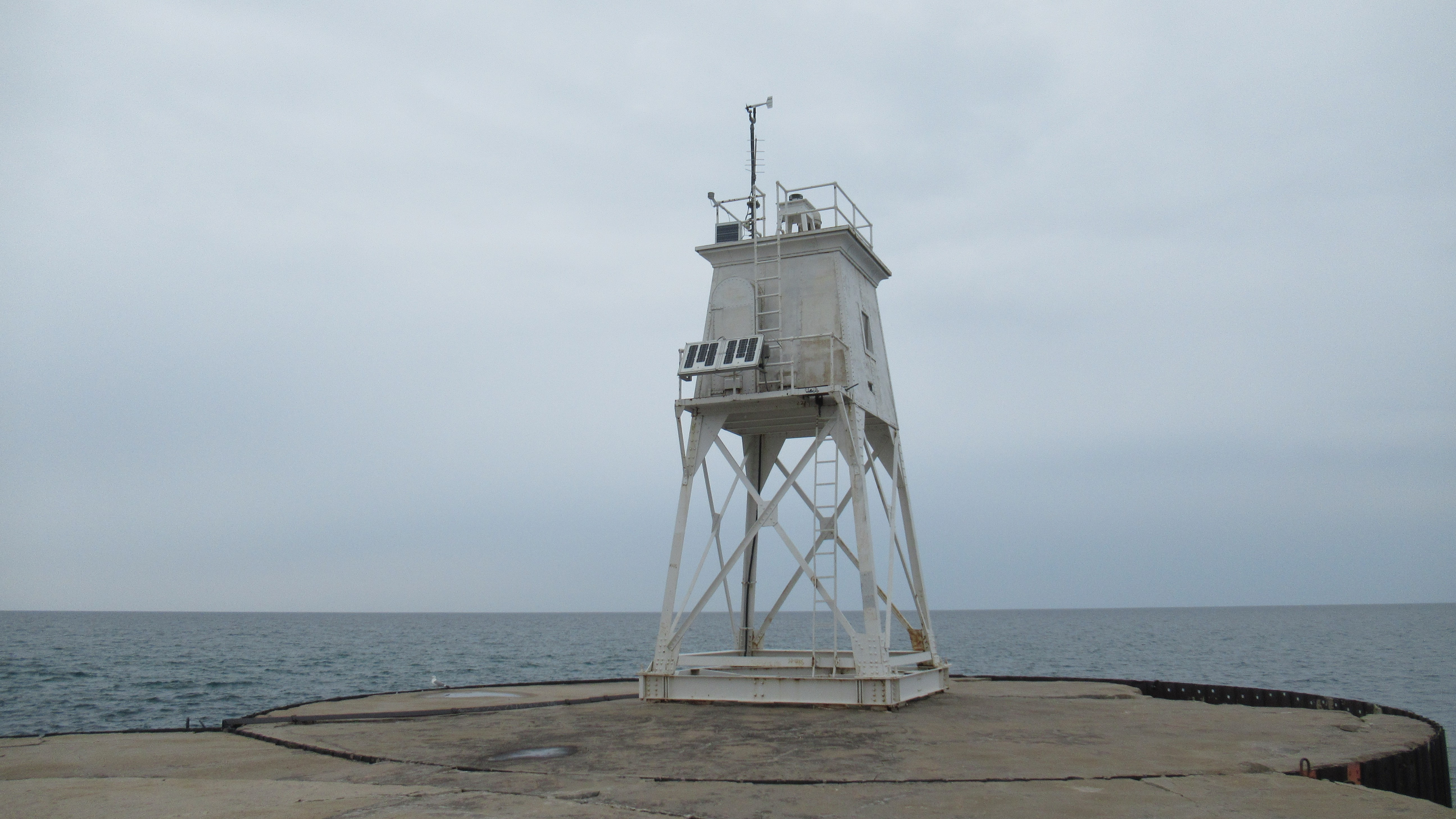
- Construction: steel (tower)
- Height: 34 ft (10 m)
- Shape: skeletal
- First lit: 1895
- Focal height: 40 ft (12 m)
- Lens: modern acrylic lens
- Range: 9 mi (14 km)
- Characteristic: Fl W 2.5s

The Grand Marais Harbor of Refuge Inner and Outer Lights are a pair of lighthouses located on the west pier at the entry to Grand Marais Harbor of Refuge, in Grand Marais, Michigan. They were listed on the National Register of Historic Places in 2012.

== History: harbor and light construction ==
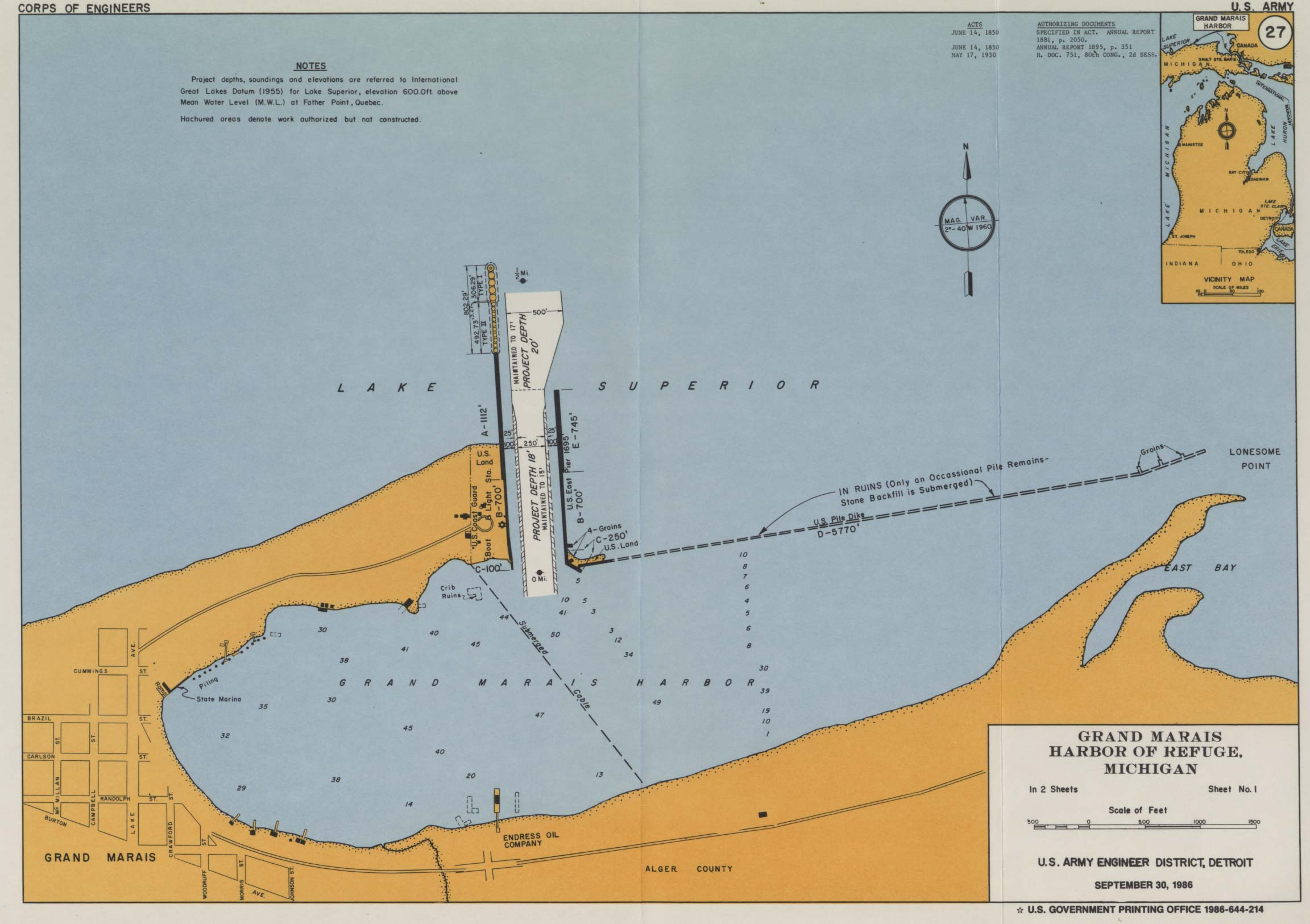
Map of Grand Marais Harbor

In the 1870s, shipping traffic through Lake Superior increased tremendously. Realizing the lack of a safe harbor between Whitefish Bay and Grand Island, the Army Corps of Engineers began upgrading the harbor at Grand Marais in 1881. Over the next ten years, the Corps dredged the harbor and constructed a 5,770 feet (1,760 m) timber pile breakwater stretching across the harbor. A shipping channel was dredged into the harbor, and two timber crib piers 700 feet (210 m) long were built to each side of the channel. These piers were extended one section at a time.

As the work on the harbor neared completion, the Lighthouse Board decided that navigation into the harbor would be improved by the addition of a light and fog signal on the head of the western pier. They requested funding for a light in 1892, and Congress allocated funds in 1895. The Board quickly drew up plans and awarded contracts to build a prefabricated light, and the new tower light was in place by November 1895. A fog signal originally located at the Point Iroquois Light was transferred to Grand Marais, and no keeper's quarters were built, causing the project to be significantly under budget (although the keeper was reduced to living in a "temporary" shanty).

Realizing that the addition of a rear range light would improve navigation, the Lighthouse Board requested that the unused funds be re-appropriated toward constructing a second light. Congress agreed in 1897, and by 1898 the second light was fabricated and installed at the inner end of the pier.

== Later history ==
In 1905, the west pier was extended 612 feet (187 m), and the following year the front range light was moved to the new pierhead. In 1908, a keeper's quarters was finally constructed. As larger vessels began traveling in the Great Lakes, the Grand Marais harbor decreased in importance, and in the 1940s the Corps of Engineers stopped maintaining the breakwater. It quickly rotted away, allowing sand to fill the harbor.

Around the same time, the Coast Guard took over the operation of the lights. In the 1960s and 70s, portions of the pier the lights sat on were capped with concrete. In addition, the west pier was lengthened by 802 feet (244 m) by the addition of a cellular sheet pile extension. Keepers stayed in the keeper's quarters until 1982; in 1984, the Grand Marais Historical Society received and restored the house.

Both range lights are still operational, and although the lantern in the outer range light has been replaced with a modern acrylic lens, the inner range light retains its Fresnel lens, one of the few Fresnel lenses still in use in lighthouses. The lightkeeper's house is operated as a museum.

== Description ==
The Grand Marais Harbor Inner and Outer lights area pair of lighthouses located on the Grand Marais pier, 2,610 feet (800 m) apart. Both are prefabricated skeletal iron or steel structures painted white and bolted to the pier. The outer light is 34 feet (10 m) tall and the inner light is 55 feet (17 m) tall.
