= Benefic Press =

American publisher of educational books

Benefic Press was a Chicago-based publisher of educational books for children and young adults. The publishing division of Beckley-Cardy Company, it was a prolific publisher during the middle of the 20th century.
