= List of county-designated highways in Michigan =

County-Designated Highway System
- Highway markers for A-2 in Allegan County and H-58 in Alger County
- Current highways highlighted in red, former highways in gray, FFH-16 in brown

System information
- Maintained by various county road commissions
- Length: 1,241.614 mi (1,998.184 km)
- Formed: October 1970

Highway names
- County-Designated: A-nn through H-nn
- County Road: County Road nn (CR nn, Co. Rd. nn)

System links
- County-Designated Highways

The county-designated highways in Michigan comprise a 1,241.6-mile-long (1,998.2 km) system of primary county roads across the US state of Michigan. Unlike the State Trunkline Highway System, these highways have alphanumeric designations with letters that correspond to one of eight lettered zones in the state. The County-Designated Highway System (CDH System) was created in 1970 in response to the business concerns of a woman from Saugatuck. Her one-woman crusade in the 1960s started after the highway in front of her motel was turned over to local control as a county road and removed from state highway maps when the nearby freeway opened. After nearly a decade of efforts, the first two test highways were designated, one each in the Lower and Upper peninsulas of the state and included on the 1970 state highway map. The system was created and expanded in scope c. October 5, 1970, after it was approved by the County Road Association of Michigan and the State Highway Commission.

The system uses eight lettered zones which are divided by major state highways. Each county road in the system is designated with the zone letter followed by a number. Six of the zones, A–F, are in the Lower Peninsula while the Upper Peninsula is divided into the remaining two, G and H. There have been a total of 66 different highways designated in seven of the zones; as of 2021 no E highways have been named. Participation by the county road commissions is optional, and not all counties use the system. One additional highway, Forest Highway 16 (marked as "H-16"), has appeared on state maps since the 1980s although it is not a part of the system. Of the highways designated, two were removed from the system and later partially restored.

== History ==
When the Interstate 196 (I-196) freeway was built in the Saugatuck area in the 1960s, US Highway 31 (US 31) was shifted to the new freeway. The former route along Blue Star Highway was returned to county jurisdiction, which removed the various state highway markings from the roadway and displaced Blue Star Highway from the state highway maps of the time. At the time, Mr. and Mrs. Howard "Gene" Temple owned a motel along the roadway in Saugatuck, and they were dismayed over the number of canceled reservations they were receiving because guests could not find their business. Mrs. Temple approached the Village of Saugatuck and the local chamber of commerce to get better highway markings for the area. She even contacted state legislators and members of the State Highway Commission. No changes were made, even though businesses along Blue Star Highway were suffering from a lack of traffic.

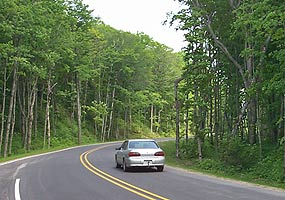
H-58 west of Grand Marais

Mrs. Temple contacted officials at the Allegan County Road Commission and the County Road Association of Michigan in August 1968. State Senator Gary Byker of Hudsonville was also contacted, and he convened meetings with representatives on the state, county and local levels in search of a solution. These meetings resulted in a test program for the 1970 state highway map that marked Blue Star Highway as A-2; the Allegan County Road Commission spent $2,000 (equivalent to $12,400 in 2024) to erect about 50 markers along the road in their county. A second road in the Upper Peninsula was designated B-1 between Engadine and Rudyard in Mackinac and Chippewa counties. Both county roads on the state highway map contained the caption "Experimental Program for Identifying Key County Roads". The markers used were the blue and yellow pentagon shields developed by the National Association of County Engineers. Mrs. Temple earned an honor as the first woman in "Michigan to obtain a highway designation from the State Highway Commission".

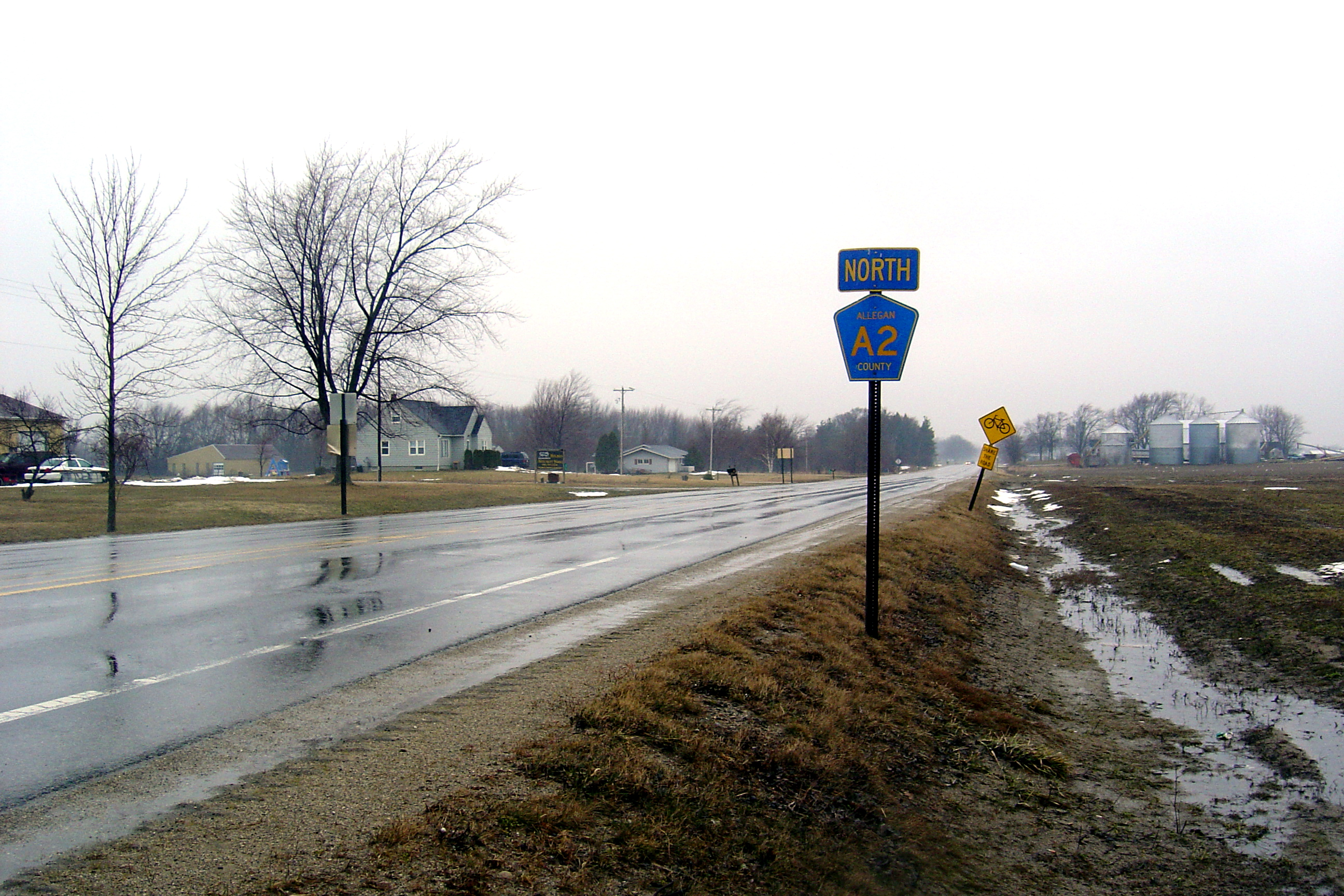
A-2 in Allegan County south of Holland

The program was implemented by October 5, 1970, and expanded in scope. Instead of using designations beginning with an A for county roads in the Lower Peninsula and with a B for those in the Upper Peninsula, the system was divided into eight zones. The first of these revised assignments were shown on the 1971 state highway map; A-2 retained its number but B-1 was renumbered to H-40 in the Upper Peninsula. Earl Rogers, the engineer-director of the County Road Association of Michigan stated at the time that the county road commissions would gradually phase in signage over the coming years. Participation in the system was made optional, but all counties had agreed to the system. As of 2015, no counties in the E zone have assigned roads to the system, and many counties in the other zones have yet to participate. The system comprises 1,241.614 miles (1,998.184 km) of roadways.

== Zone system ==
Map of the zone system

As implemented in October 1970, the CDH System is divided into eight zones: six in the Lower Peninsula and two in the Upper Peninsula. This contrasts to the state highway system that makes no attempt to group designations by geography in the state. The boundaries for each zone are determined by major state trunkline highways on each peninsula. Each highway is given a designation composed of the zone letter followed by a two-digit number. Within the zone, numbers are assigned on a grid system: north–south highways use odd numbers and east–west highways have even numbers. Lower numbers are used to the south or west sides of the zones.

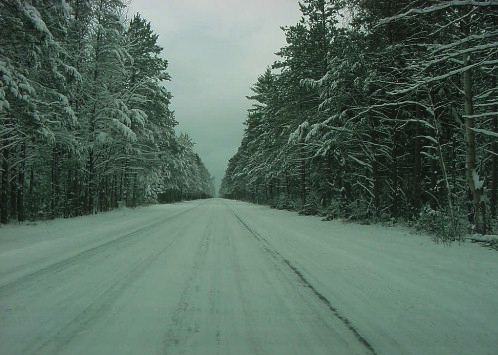
H-13 during winter

The Lower Peninsula is divided into six zones, A-F:

- The A zone is bordered by I-96 on the north and US 127 on the east. The other two sides are formed by the southern state line with Indiana and Ohio and the western boundary along Lake Michigan.
- The B zone is bordered by I-96 on the south, Lake Michigan on the west, US 10 on the north and US 127 on the east.
- The C zone is bordered by US 10 on the south and both I-75 and US 127 on the east. (Note: Since C-64 and C-66 keep their designations across I-75, M-27 likely forms part of the boundary as well.) The northwestern boundary is Lake Michigan and the Straits of Mackinac.
- The D zone is bordered by US 127 on the west, I-96 on the north, the Detroit River and Lake Erie to the east and Ohio to the south.
- The E zone is bordered by I-96 on the south, US 127 on the west, US 10 and Saginaw Bay on the north and Lake Huron on the east. As of 2015, no highways have been designated in the E zone.
- The F Zone is bordered by both I-75 and US 127 on the west, Lake Huron on the north and east with US 10 on the south.

The Upper Peninsula is divided into the G and H zones. The dividing line between the two zones is US 41, between Lakes Michigan and Superior with zone G to the west of US 41 and zone H to the east of it.

== List ==
Number	Length (mi)	Length (km)	Southern or western terminus	Northern or eastern terminus	Counties	Formed	Removed	Notes
A-2	41.609	66.963	M-63 in Lake Michigan Beach	BL I-196/US 31 in Holland	Berrien, Van Buren, Allegan	1970	current	Was part of US 31 until 1963
A-37	23.154	37.263	M-222 in Allegan	I-196 in Hudsonville	Allegan, Ottawa	1977	current	
A-42	16.441	26.459	M-40 in Heath Township	US 131 & M-179 in Hopkins Township	Allegan	1982	current	Eastern half became M-179 in 1998
A-45	41.870	67.383	Bus. US 131 in Kalamazoo	M-11 in Grand Rapids	Kalamazoo, Allegan, Kent	1972	current	Was part of US 131 until segments were bypassed between 1957 and 1963
B-15	34.069	54.829	US 31, Bus. US 31 & B-86 in Montague Township	Old Bus. US 31 (Monroe Road) in Pentwater Township	Muskegon, Oceana	1970	current	
B-23	10.574	17.017	US 31 in Dalton Township	B-86 in Blue Lake Township	Muskegon	1971	current	
B-31	25.178	40.520	I-96 in Nunica	M-120 in Brunswick	Ottawa, Muskegon, Newaygo	1970	current	Was M-213 from the mid-1930s until the end of the 1950s
B-35	31.004	49.896	I-96 in Coopersville	M-82 in Sheridan Township	Ottawa, Muskegon, Newaygo	1970	current	
B-72	41.283	66.439	US 31 in Muskegon	US 131 & M-57 in Algoma Township	Muskegon, Ottawa, Kent	1970	current	
B-86	17.059	27.454	US 31 & Bus. US 31/B-15 in Montague Township	M-82 & M-120 at the Holton–Greenwood– Dayton–Sheridan township quadri-point	Muskegon, Oceana	1970	current	
B-88	15.416	24.810	M-37 in White Cloud	US 131 in Mecosta Township	Newaygo, Mecosta	1984	1998	Became part of M-20
B-96	16.231	26.121	M-37 in Lilley Township	US 131 & Bus. US 131 in Big Rapids Township	Newaygo, Mecosta	1984	current	
C-38	18.738	30.156	US 131 & M-88 in Mancelona	Old 27 & F-38 in Otsego Lake Township	Antrim, Otsego	1970	current	
C-42	13.039	20.984	US 131 in Alba	M-32 on the Elmira–Hayes township line	Antrim, Otsego	1970	current	
C-48	36.665	59.007	US 31 in Atwood	Old 27 in Corwith Township	Antrim, Charlevoix, Otsego	1970	current	
C-56	15.801	25.429	US 31 in Charlevoix Township	M-75 in Boyne City	Charlevoix	1972	current	
C-58	21.722	34.958	C-81 in Bear Creek Township	I-75 in Wolverine	Emmet, Cheboygan	1984	current	
C-64	16.304	26.239	US 31 in Pellston	M-27 in Inverness Township	Emmet, Cheboygan	1970	current	
C-65	18.028	29.013	M-88 in Central Lake Township	US 31 in Charlevoix	Antrim, Charlevoix	1972	current	
C-66	28.047	45.137	M-119 & C-77 in Cross Village	US 23 & M-27 in Cheboygan	Emmet, Cheboygan	1970	current	
C-71	5.031	8.097	C-56 in Horton Bay	US 31 in Bay Shore	Charlevoix, Emmet	1972	current	
C-73	8.118	13.065	M-32 on the Jordan–Warner township line	M-75 in Boyne City	Emmet, Charlevoix	1972	current	
C-77	15.970	25.701	M-119 in Harbor Springs	M-119 & C-66 in Cross Village	Emmet	1970	current	
C-81	10.028	16.139	US 131 & M-75 in Walloon Lake	US 31 in Bay View	Charlevoix, Emmet	1982	current	Southern segment
C-81	32.658	52.558	M-119 in Little Traverse Township	Nicolet Avenue in Mackinaw City	Emmet	1970	current	Northern segment
D-19	11.172	17.980	D-32 in Pinckney	I-96 in Marion Township	Livingston	1970	current	
D-32	8.371	13.472	M-106 in Gregory	D-19 in Pinckney	Livingston	1970	current	Also called the "Highway to Hell"
F-01	9.934	15.987	F-38 on the Charlton–Vienna township line	F-44 on the Charlton–Vienna township line	Otsego, Montmorency	1970	current	Follows the Otsego–Montmorency county line
F-05	24.499	39.427	M-33/M-68 in Forest Township	US 23 on the Cheboygan–Benton Township line	Cheboygan	1970	current	
F-18	28.761	46.286	F-97 in Nester Township	F-19 in Prescott	Roscommon, Ogemaw, Iosco	1979	1984	
F-18	18.111	29.147	F-97 in Nester Township	M-33 on the Horton–Mills township line	Roscommon, Ogemaw	2003	current	
F-19	13.058	21.015	Mason–Richland township line	Sage Lake & Laird Lake roads in Hill Township	Ogemaw	1977	1984	
F-20	25.120	40.427	Henderson Lake Road on the Mills–Richland township line	US 23 on the Tawas City–Alabaster Township line	Ogemaw, Iosco	1977	1984	
F-21	27.252	43.858	M-32 near Hillman	US 23 in Rogers City	Montmorency, Presque Isle	1984	current	
F-26	20.871	33.589	Siegrist Road on the Hill–Plainfield township line	M-55 in Tawas Township	Iosco County	1977	1984	
F-28	31.905	51.346	F-97 at St. Helen	M-65 in Plainfield Township	Roscommon, Ogemaw, Iosco	1977	1984	
F-28	2.010	3.235	F-97 in Richfield Township	Richfield–Foster township line	Roscommon	2003	current	
F-30	21.920	35.277	M-65 in Glennie	US 23 in Greenbush	Alcona	1973	current	
F-32	55.866	89.908	BL I-75/M-93 in Grayling	M-65/M-72 in Curran	Crawford, Oscoda, Alcona	1982	current	
F-38	15.834	25.482	Old 27 & C-38 in Otsego Lake Township	F-01 on the Charlton–Vienna township line	Otsego	1970	current	
F-41	31.803	51.182	US 23 in Oscoda	US 23 in Caledonia Township	Iosco, Alcona	1973	current	Was M-171 from 1936 until 1960
F-42	7.252	11.671	BL I-75 in Gaylord	M-32	Otsego	1970	current	
F-44	15.649	25.185	M-32 on the Bagley–Livingston township line	F-01 on the Charlton–Vienna township line	Otsego	1970	current	
F-97	72.164	116.137	M-18 on the Sage–Sherman township line	M-32 in Charlton Township	Gladwin, Roscommon, Crawford, Otsego	1971	current	
G-08	2.335	3.758	CTH-JJ at the Wisconsin state line in Mellen Township	US 41 in Wallace	Menominee	1970	current	
G-12	23.547	37.895	CR 352 & Z-1 Road in Lake Township	M-35 in Cedar River	Menominee	1970	current	
G-18	11.850	19.071	CTH-Z at the Wisconsin state line in Holmes Township	US 41 in Carney	Menominee	1972	current	
G-30	46.470	74.786	M-95 in Randville	US 2/US 41 in Bark River Township	Dickinson, Menominee Delta	1972	1991	Became part of M-69
G-38	9.632	15.501	G-67 in Ralph	US 2/US 41/M-35 in Escanaba	Dickinson, Marquette, Delta	1972	2002	
G-67	9.460	15.224	M-69 in Felch	G-38 in Ralph	Dickinson	1972	2002	
G-69	16.669	26.826	US 2 in Waucedah	M-69 in Foster City	Dickinson	1972	current	
H-01	11.038	17.764	M-67 in Trenary	M-94 in Eben Junction	Alger	1972	current	Southern segment
H-01	8.789	14.145	M-94 in Chatham	M-28 in Onota Township	Alger	1972	current	Northern segment
H-03	7.702	12.395	M-94 in Forest Lake	M-28 in Au Train	Alger	1972	current	
H-05	13.570	21.839	Alger–Delta county line	M-94 in Au Train Township	Alger	1973	current	
H-11	3.504	5.639	H-58 in Munising Township	Miners Castle in Munising Township	Alger	2004	current	Was part of H-13
H-13	36.192	58.245	US 2 in Nahma Junction	H-58 in Munising Township	Delta, Alger, Schoolcraft	1972	current	Runs along Federal Forest Highway 13 (FFH 13)
H-15	4.940	7.950	M-28/M-94 in Shingleton	H-58 in Van Meer	Alger	1972	current	
FFH 16	50.504	81.278	CR 436 in Stambaugh Township	M-38 in Laird Township	Iron, Houghton, Ontonagon	—	—	Mis-marked as "H-16" on state maps in 1983–85 and again since 1992
H-33	18.222	29.325	US 2 in Newton Township	M-28 in Lakefield Township	Mackinac, Luce	1970	current	Was M-135 from 1929 until 1960
H-37	22.852	36.777	M-123 in McMillan Township	H-58 in Deer Park	Luce	1970	current	
H-40	52.680	84.780	M-117 in Engadine	M-48 in Rudyard	Mackinac, Chippewa	1970	current	Was part of M-48 from 1927 until 1960, and then B-1 in the test phase
H-42	10.225	16.456	M-77 in Germfask Township	H-33 in Curtis	Schoolcraft, Mackinac	1970	current	
H-44	8.162	13.135	US 41 in Kiva	M-67 in Limestone	Alger	1972	current	Western segment
H-44	11.594	18.659	M-77 in Germfask	H-33 in Helmer	Mackinac, Luce	1970	current	Eastern segment; was part of M-98 from 1919 until 1960
H-52	12.631	20.328	M-28 in Hiawatha Township	H-58 in Melstrand	Alger, Schoolcraft	1972	2004	
H-57	7.635	12.287	US 2 in Moran Township	M-123 in Brevort Township	Mackinac	1970	current	
H-58	68.985	111.021	M-28 in Munising	H-37 in Deer Park	Alger, Schoolcraft	1970	current	Western paved section runs through the Pictured Rocks National Lakeshore
H-63	45.276	72.865	BL I-75 in St. Ignace Township	BS I-75 in Sault Ste. Marie	Mackinac, Chippewa	1970	current	Was part of US 2 from 1933 until 1962–63
Former
