= Rock River Township, Michigan =

- Civil township
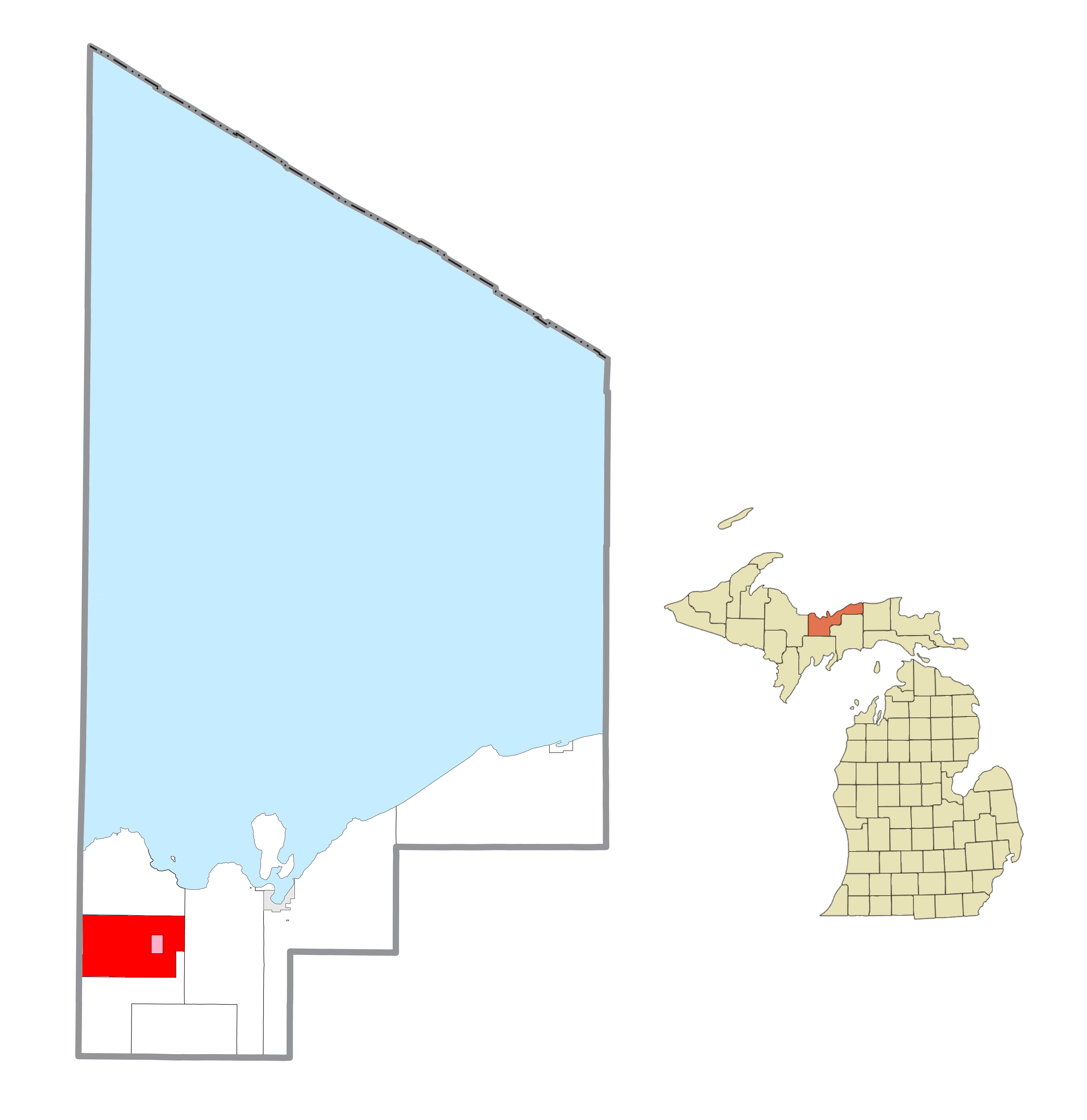
- Location within Alger County (red) and the administered village of Chatham (pink)

- Location within the state of Michigan Location within the United States
- Coordinates: 46°21′05″N 86°57′56″W
- Country: United States
- State: Michigan
- County: Alger

Government
  - Supervisor: Teri Grout
  - Clerk: Dawn Leppanen

Area
  - Total: 81.0 sq mi (209.8 km^{2})
  - Land: 80.7 sq mi (209.1 km^{2})
  - Water: 0.27 sq mi (0.7 km^{2})
- Elevation: 988 ft (301 m)

Population (2020)
  - Total: 1,231
  - Density: 15/sq mi (5.8/km^{2})
- Time zone: UTC-5 (Eastern (EST))
  - Summer (DST): UTC-4 (EDT)
- ZIP code(s): 49806 (Au Train); 49816 (Chatham); 49822 (Deerton); 49825 (Eben Junction); 49826 (Rumely); 49885 (Skandia); 49891 (Trenary)
- Area code: 906
- FIPS code: 26-69160
- GNIS feature ID: 1626993
- Website: https://www.rockrivertownship.org/

Rock River Township is a civil township of Alger County in the U.S. state of Michigan. The population was 1,231 at the 2020 census.

== Geography ==
According to the United States Census Bureau, the township has a total area of 81.0 square miles (209.8 km^{2}), of which 80.7 square miles (209.1 km^{2}) is land and 0.27 square miles (0.7 km^{2}), or 0.31%, is water.

=== Communities ===
- Chatham is a village at the junction of M-67 and M-94.
- Eben Junction is an unincorporated community at 46°21′18″N 86°58′12″W. The Eben Junction ZIP code 49825 provides P.O. box service for a portion of Rock River Township and an area of adjacent Onota Township. It was a station at the junction of the Minneapolis, St. Paul and Sault Ste. Marie Railroad and the Munising Railway. A post office was established on August 1, 1908, with Emil Hoppe as the first postmaster of the Finnish settlement. Superior Central Schools is located in the community.
- Rumely is an unincorporated community at 46°20′54″N 87°01′59″W. It was named for Mr. Rumely, who settled here from Ohio about 1873. It was a station on the Munising Railway about 1890. A post office was established on September 24, 1906, with Cyrill Valind as its first postmaster. The office closed on March 31, 1943, and was reestablished on December 16, 1947. It closed again on August 31, 1959, and is now a CPO of Eben Junction providing P.O. box service for ZIP code 49826. The Post Office was located in the old Rumely Store, but closed in 2011 or 2012 when the store closed. The store reopened, under new ownership, in February 2015, but without any mail service.
- Slapneck is a place at 46°20′34″N 86°53′11″W.
- Sundell is an unincorporated community at 46°20′50″N 87°04′47″W. In 1908, Dorsey was a station on the Munising, Marquette and Southeastern Railway. The first postmaster, Selma Harsila, submitted her maiden name, Sundell (Swedish), as the name of the new post office. The office operated from August 31, 1922 until August 25, 1967. Dorsey is approximately a half mile to the west at 46°20′23″N 87°05′04″W.
- Winters was a former post office in the township at 46°11′42″N 86°55′43″W. The settlement was named for John D. Winters, who was also the first postmaster. The post office first opened September 20, 1889 and closed August 15, 1923. It reopened from February 25, 1924, until June 15, 1928.

== Demographics ==
Historical population
Census	Pop.	Note	%±
1960	1,354		—
1970	1,202		−11.2%
1980	1,408		17.1%
1990	1,279		−9.2%
2000	1,213		−5.2%
2010	1,212		−0.1%
Source: Census Bureau. Census 1960- 2000, 2010.

In 2000, there were 1,213 people, 505 households, and 363 families residing in the township. The racial makeup of the township was 96.13% White, 1.98% Native American, 0.08% Asian, and 1.81% from two or more races. Among them, 42.2% were of Finnish, 8.1% German, 6.5% French, 6.3% Polish and 5.6% American ancestry. By the publication of the 2020 census, its population grew to 1,231.

In 2000, there were 505 households, out of which 28.3% had children under the age of 18 living with them, 60.2% were married couples living together, 5.9% had a female householder with no husband present, and 28.1% were non-families. 24.0% of all households were made up of individuals, and 10.9% had someone living alone who was 65 years of age or older. The average household size was 2.39 and the average family size was 2.82.

In the township the population was spread out, with 22.3% under the age of 18, 7.9% from 18 to 24, 25.0% from 25 to 44, 30.0% from 45 to 64, and 14.8% who were 65 years of age or older. The median age was 42 years. For every 100 females, there were 102.8 males. For every 100 females age 18 and over, there were 104.3 males.

In 2000, the median income for a household in the township was $32,619, and the median income for a family was $36,750. Males had a median income of $32,132 versus $24,583 for females. The per capita income for the township was $16,360. About 8.1% of families and 10.8% of the population were below the poverty line, including 16.9% of those under age 18 and 11.1% of those age 65 or over. The 2021 census estimates determined the median household income was $54,677.
