= Hanley Field =

Public use airport in Munising, Michigan

Hanley Field Airport
- IATA: none; ICAO: none; FAA LID: 5Y7

Summary
- Owner/Operator: Alger County, Michigan
- Serves: Munising, Michigan
- Location: Alger County, Michigan
- Time zone: UTC−05:00 (-5)
  - Summer (DST): UTC−04:00 (-4)
- Elevation AMSL: 984 ft / 300 m
- Coordinates: 46°21′15″N 86°37′16″W

Map
- Location of airport in Michigan 5Y7 (the United States)

Runways
| Direction | Length | | Surface |
| Direction | ft | m | Surface |
|---|---|---|---|
| 18/36 | 4,000 | 1,219 | Turf |

Statistics (2021)
- Aircraft Movements: 200

Hanley Field (FAA LID: 5Y7) is a publicly owned, private use airport located three miles (4.8 km) southeast of Munising, Alger County, Michigan. The airport sits on 252 acres (102 ha) at an elevation of 984 feet (300 m) next to County Highway H-13 south of State Highway M-28/M-94.

Until 2019, the airport was managed by the U.S. Forest Service as it was on the land of the Hiawatha National Forest. However, it was transferred to the control of Alger County in a land swap along with additional land that became part of the Munising Township Cemetery. The swap was studied since at least 2012, when the forest service began a Feasibility Analysis of swapping the land, and an environmental analysis was completed in 2015.

In 2022, the airport was host to staging and training activities for contested logistics, sustainment, and multicapable Airmen concepts held by the United States Air Force. The airport closed to civilian aircraft as well as all foot traffic for three days while the drills were being held.

== Facilities and aircraft ==
The airport has one runway, designated as runway 18/36. It measures 4,000 by 120 feet (1,219 m × 37 m) and is made of turf. For the 12-month period ending December 31, 2021, the airport averages 200 aircraft operations per year an average of roughly 17 per month. It is all general aviation. For the same time period, there was one aircraft based at the airport, a single-engine airplane.

The airport is closed from November to mid-May.

The aircraft does not have a fixed-base operator, and no fuel is available.

== Accidents and incidents ==
- On September 2, 2008, a Cessna 182 Skylane sustained substantial damage after landing at Hanley Field. The pilot placed a gasoline powered "weed whip" on the rear passenger seats of the airplane for a personal flight. The pilot smelled a "strong" smell of gasoline as the airplane touched down for landing at the destination airport. During the after landing taxi, the engine end of the weed whip fell behind the two front seats. The pilot stated that he reached back and placed the weed whip back onto the seats and "something caused it to ignite." The pilot stated that he was charging his cell phone where the weed whip was located. The pilot stated that the smoke was so bad that he pulled the mixture control to idle cutoff and exited the airplane. The aircraft was consumed by fire. The probable cause of the accident was found to be the inadequate preflight planning/preparation by the pilot to carry a hazardous material aboard an airplane that resulted in a fire during an after-landing taxi.

== See also ==
- List of airports in Michigan
