= M-67 (Michigan highway) =

State highway in Alger County, Michigan, United States

M-67
- M-67 highlighted in red

Route information
- Maintained by MDOT
- Length: 12.044 mi (19.383 km)
- Existed: c. July 1, 1919–present

Major junctions
- South end: US 41 in Trenary
- H-44 in Limestone
- North end: M-94 in Chatham

Location
- Country: United States
- State: Michigan
- Counties: Alger

Highway system
- Michigan State Trunkline Highway System; Interstate; US; State; Byways
← M-66	→ M-68

M-67 is a north–south state trunkline highway in the Upper Peninsula of the U.S. state of Michigan. It connects with US Highway 41 (US 41) and M-94 between Trenary and Chatham. The highway has largely been unchanged during its history, although the highways that connect to M-67 on each end have changed several times.

== Route description ==
M-67 starts at an intersection with US 41 near Trenary east of the West Branch of the Whitefish River. From that intersection the highway runs east crossing Scott Creek before running into downtown Trenary along relatively flat terrain. East of town, the highway turns north running parallel to the AuTrain River Basin. The trunkline crosses Dexter Creek between Paulsen and Trout Lake roads. About halfway along the north–south segment of the highway, M-67 passes through the community of Limestone and crosses Johnson Creek. After running for 12.044 miles (19.383 km), M-67 ends at a four-way intersection with M-94 and Tunteri Road.

Michigan Department of Transportation (MDOT) traffic surveys in 2007 show that between 1,200 and 1,400 vehicles traveled the road daily in 2007 in a measure of the annual average daily traffic (AADT). The same surveys showed that only 90 trucks are included in that average. In comparison, US 41 south of M-67 carried an average of 2,300 vehicles and 270 trucks. No segment of the trunkline is listed on the National Highway System, a system of strategically important highways.

== History ==
M-67 is an original state trunkline dating back to 1919. Its routing has been largely unchanged since designation. The southern terminus has been moved once, but the northern terminus has remained in the same location since 1919. US 41 was rerouted in the Trenary area to run west of town in late 1937 and 1938. M-67 was extended westerly along a former portion of US 41 to connect to the new highway on the south end of M-67. The highway was fully paved at the end of the 1950s.

While the highway itself is largely unchanged since 1919, the connections with other trunklines have changed. The intersection south of the community of Chatham where M-67 has ended since designation has remained unchanged. The other highways running through the intersection have changed twice. The first highway to connect with M-67 was M-25. M-25 was replaced by M-28 in 1926. The second change came in 1941 when the routings of M-28 and M-94 were exchanged between Harvey and Munising.

The original southern terminus was at an intersection with M-15 in Trenary. In 1926, M-15 was replaced by US 41. As stated previously, the southern terminus of M-67 was shifted to a new intersection with US 41 west of Trenary when the latter was rebuilt in the late 1930s resulting in the only physical change to M-67's routing.

== Major intersections ==
The entire highway is in Alger County.

Location	mi	km	Destinations	Notes
Trenary	0.000	0.000	US 41 – Marquette, Escanaba	
Trenary	0.621	0.999	H-01 north – Traunik	Southern terminus of H-01
Limestone	7.032	11.317	H-44 west – Traunik	Eastern terminus of H-44, western segment
Chatham	12.044	19.383	M-94 – Skandia, Munising	
1.000 mi = 1.609 km; 1.000 km = 0.621 mi
