= M-94 (Michigan highway) =

State highway in Michigan, United States

M-94
- M-94 highlighted in red

Route information
- Maintained by MDOT
- Length: 86.983 mi (139.986 km)
- Existed: c. 1927–present
- Tourist routes: Lake Superior Circle Tour

Major junctions
- West end: M-553 at K. I. Sawyer
- Sawyer International Airport; US 41 near Skandia; M-67 at Chatham; M-28 in Munising; M-28 in Shingleton
- South end: US 2 in Manistique

Location
- Country: United States
- State: Michigan
- Counties: Marquette, Alger, Schoolcraft

Highway system
- Michigan State Trunkline Highway System; Interstate; US; State; Byways
← BL I-94	→ M-95

M-94 is a state trunkline in the Upper Peninsula of the US state of Michigan. It runs for 86.983 miles (139.986 km) from K. I. Sawyer to Manistique. The highway is part of the Lake Superior Circle Tour during a concurrency with M-28. M-94 crosses the Siphon Bridge in Manistique, unique for the fact that the bridge roadway is below water level.

M-94 has been realigned several times. It has had its own roadway between the M-28 junctions in Munising and Shingleton. Other changes have flip-flopped M-94 with M-28 between Harvey and Munising and extended it across the former K.I. Sawyer Air Force Base.

== Route description ==
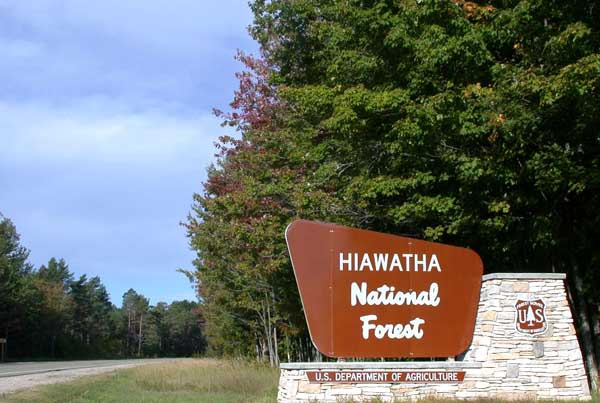
Hiawatha National Forest road sign on M-28/M-94 in Alger County west of Shingleton

M-94 begins at an intersection with M-553 and crosses the former K. I. Sawyer AFB. Then it overlaps US 41 for a little over a mile near Skandia. East of Skandia, M-94 runs through forest lands and serves the communities of Sundell and Rumely before entering Eben Junction. There M-94 intersects the southern section of H-01. Further east is Chatham where there are junctions with the northern section of H-01 and M-67. M-94 turns southerly briefly before returning to an east–west direction to head to the community of Forest Lake and ultimately Munising. There M-94 joins a concurrency with M-28 and the Lake Superior Circle Tour from Munising to Shingleton. Until the turn at Shingleton, the route is more decidedly east–west than north–south. Between Shingleton and Manistique, M-94 is more north–south.

South of Shingleton, M-94 runs through forest lands as a part of the Great Manistique Swamp. Along the way are national forest campgrounds located near Steuben. South of Crooked Lake, M-94 curves to the east before turning almost due south to the Manistique area. In Manistique, M-94 enters town on North 5th St before turning to follow Deer Street and River Street. On River Street, the trunkline uses the Siphon Bridge to cross the Manistique River and then uses Elk and Maple streets before terminating at US 2 at Lakeshore Drive.

=== Siphon Bridge ===
In Manistique, M-94 crosses the Manistique River on the "Siphon Bridge". Built as a part of a raceway flume on the river, the water level actually used to be higher than the road surface. This produced a siphon effect, giving the bridge its nickname. The Manistique Pulp and Paper Company was organized in 1916 and needed a dam on the Manistique River to supply their mill. This dam would have needed to flood a large section of the city. The shallow river banks meant difficulties in any bridge construction. Instead of expensive dikes, a concrete tank was built lengthwise in the river bed. The sides of this tank provided man-made banks higher than the natural banks. The Michigan Works Progress Administration described the bridge as having, "concrete bulkheads, formed by the side spans of the bridge, [that] allow the mill to maintain the water level several feet above the roadbed." The bridge acted as a siphon because the water level was above the roadway, and the structure has been featured in Ripley's Believe It or Not!

== History ==
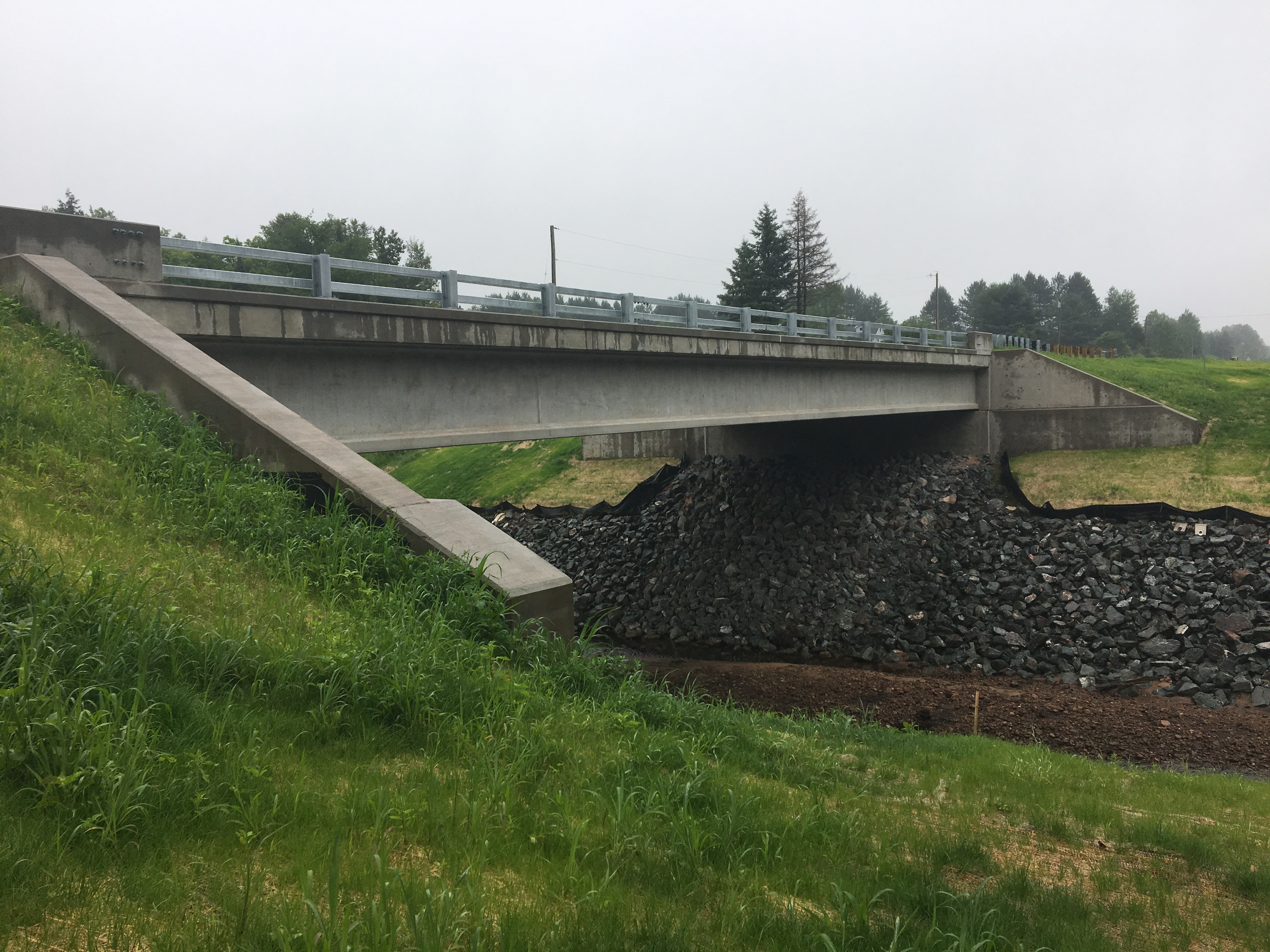
Bridge over the Chocolay River

The December 1927 Michigan State Highway Department Official Highway Service Map shows M-94 routed from Au Train west to Munising and further along its current routing to Manistique. In 1928 or 1929, M-94 was rerouted to run along Munising-Van Meer-Shingleton Road (now H-58 and H-15) and southerly to Shingleton. This routing was abandoned on November 7, 1963. It was later extended westward to Harvey in 1939. In 1941, the portion of M-94 west from Munising to Harvey was made a part of M-28, and M-94 was extended along its current routing from Munising to US 41. M-94 was extended for the last time in 1998 over US 41 and through the old K. I. Sawyer Air Force Base to end at a newly designated M-553. In October 2016, heavy rainfall cause the culverts directing the Chocolay River under M-94 in West Branch Township to fail. The Michigan Department of Transportation (MDOT) started construction of a 129-foot-long (39 m), concrete, single-span bridge at a cost of $1.8 million on March 6, 2017, and opened the structure to traffic on June 28 of the same year.

== Major intersections ==
County	Location	mi	km	Destinations	Notes
Marquette	K. I. Sawyer	0.000	0.000	M-553 – Gwinn, Marquette	
Marquette	West Branch Township	8.037	12.934	CR 545 north	Southern terminus of northern segment of CR 545
Marquette	West Branch Township	8.534	13.734	CR 545 south	Northern terminus of southern segment of CR 545
Marquette	Skandia Township	10.792	17.368	US 41 north – Marquette	Northern end of US 41 concurrency
Marquette	Skandia Township	11.858	19.084	US 41 south – Escanaba CR 541 south	Southern end of US 41 concurrency; northern terminus of CR 541
Marquette	Dukes	14.731	23.707	CR 533 south	Northern terminus of CR 533
Alger	Eben Junction	23.747	38.217	H-01 south – Traunik	Northern terminus of southern segment of H-01
Alger	Chatham	25.950	41.762	H-01 north – Deerton	Southern terminus of northern segment of H-01
Alger	Chatham	26.947	43.367	M-67 south – Trenary	Northern terminus of M-67
Alger	Forest Lake	30.510	49.101	H-03 north – Au Train	Southern terminus of H-03
Alger	Stillman	33.943	54.626	H-05 south	Northern terminus of H-05
Alger	Munising	42.509	68.412	M-28 west / LSCT west – Munising	Western end of M-28/LSCT concurrency
Alger	Wetmore	44.419	71.485	H-13 / FFH 13 south – Nahma	
Alger	Shingleton	51.979	83.652	M-28 east / LSCT east – Seney, Newberry H-15 north – Van Meer	Eastern end of M-28/LSCT concurrency
Schoolcraft	Inwood–Thompson township line	63.970	102.950	CR 437 south – Steuben	Northern terminus of CR 437
Schoolcraft	Thompson Township	67.241	108.214	CR 449 south	Northern terminus of CR 449
Schoolcraft	Manistique	85.230	137.164	CR 440 west (State Street)	Eastern terminus of CR 440
Schoolcraft	Manistique	85.490	137.583	CR 442 west (Deer Street) – Cooks	Eastern terminus of CR 442
Schoolcraft	Manistique	86.983	139.986	US 2 / LMCT – Escanaba, St. Ignace	
1.000 mi = 1.609 km; 1.000 km = 0.621 mi: Concurrency terminus
