= List of National Natural Landmarks in Michigan =

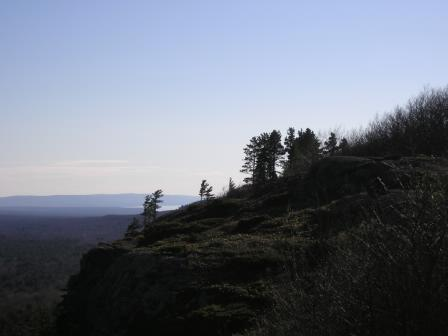
Porcupine Mountains

The National Natural Landmarks in Michigan include 12 of the almost 600 United States National Natural Landmarks (NNLs). They cover areas of geological and biological importance, and include bogs, several forest types, and habitats for several rare species. The landmarks are located in 12 of the state's 83 counties. Two counties have two Natural Landmarks each, while two Landmarks are located in parts of two counties. The first designation, Warren Woods State Park, was made in 1967, while the most recent, the Porcupine Mountains, was made in 1984. Natural Landmarks in Michigan range from 24 to 11,600 acres (9.7 to 4,694.4 ha; 0.038 to 18.125 sq mi) in size. Owners include Michigan State University, private individuals and several state and federal agencies.

The National Natural Landmarks Program is administered by the National Park Service, a branch of the Department of the Interior. The National Park Service determines which properties meet NNL criteria and makes nomination recommendations after an owner notification process. The Secretary of the Interior reviews nominations and, based on a set of predetermined criteria, makes a decision on NNL designation or a determination of eligibility for designation. Both public and privately owned properties can be designated as NNLs. Owners may object to the nomination of the property as a NNL. This designation provides indirect, partial protection of the historic integrity of the properties via tax incentives, grants, monitoring of threats, and other means.

== National Natural Landmarks ==
Michigan National Natural Landmarks (clickable map)

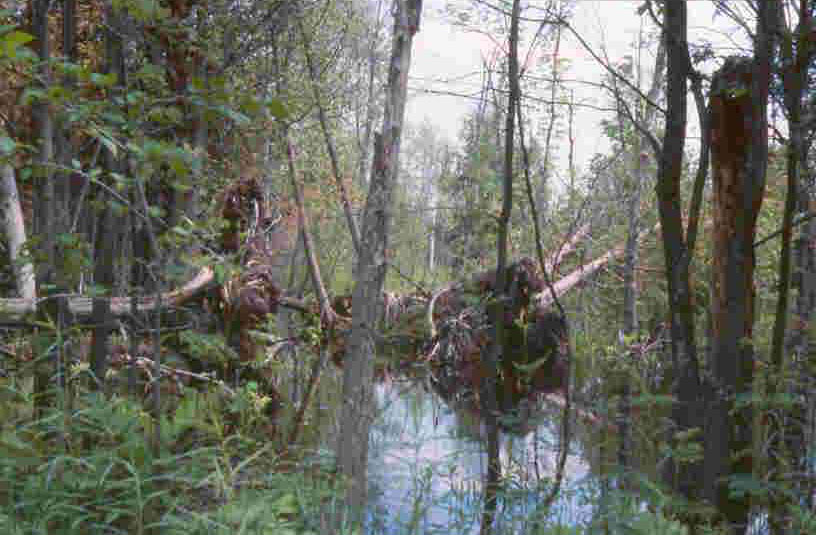
Dead Stream Swamp

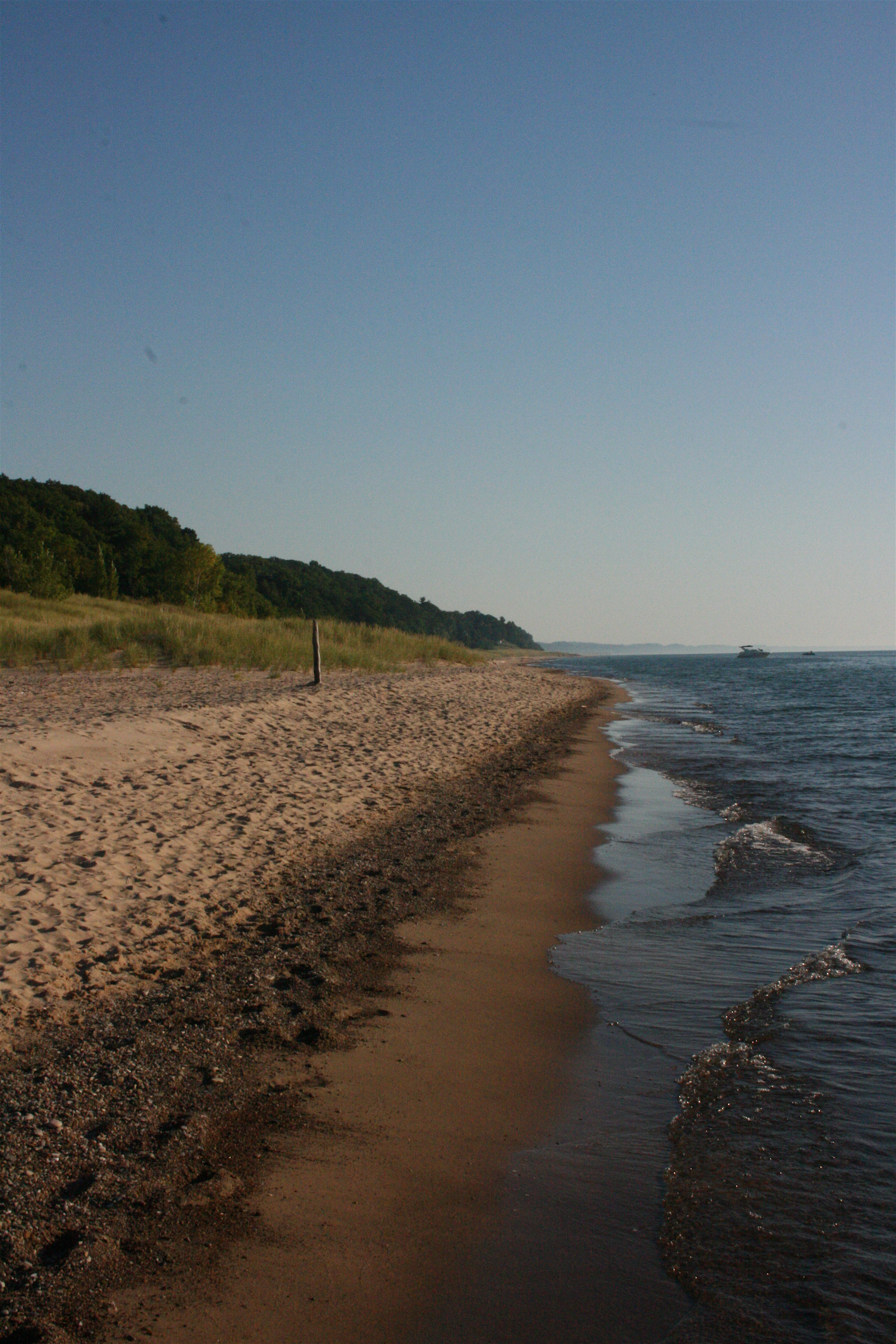
Grand Mere Beach

Warren Woods

Name	Date	Location	County	Ownership	Description
Black Spruce Bog Natural Area	1976	42°18′58.00″N 84°11′46.49″W	Jackson	State	A boreal bog forest with a stand of black spruce; illustrates the last stage of evolution in a sphagnum bog ecosystem. Although this is not a remote location, it does not have designated trails or signage. Part of Waterloo State Recreation Area.
Dead Stream Swamp	1976	44°6′0″N 84°10′12″W	Missaukee, Roscommon	State	An extensive northern white cedar swamp, illustrating the last stage of bog forest evolution. Part of Au Sable State Forest.
Dukes Research Natural Area	1974	46°21′0″N 87°10′0.01″W	Marquette	Federal	A swamp containing undisturbed stands of cedar and mixed conifers and old-growth hardwood. Part of Hiawatha National Forest.
Grand Mere Lakes	1968	41°59′35″N 86°32′59″W	Berrien	State, private	Contains multiple low areas created by Lake Michigan's post-glacial ancestors, illustrating aquatic to terrestrial evolution. Provides habitat for several rare species. Part of Grand Mere State Park.
Haven Hill State Natural Area	1976	42°38′11″N 83°34′23″W	Oakland	State	A small area that incorporates all forest types found in southern Michigan; plays host to over 100 bird species and 17 species of mammals. Part of Highland Recreation Area.
Newton Woods	1976	42°0′32.7594″N 85°58′16.32″W	Cass	State	One of the Lower Peninsula's last remaining old-growth, mixed-oak hardwood forests. Part of the Michigan State University managed Fred Russ Forest.
Porcupine Mountains	1984	46°46′N 89°45′W	Gogebic, Ontonagon	State	Contains extensive white pine and virgin northern hemlock, as well as wave-cut beaches that mark the shorelines of ancient glacial lakes. Part of Porcupine Mountains Wilderness State Park.
Roscommon Virgin Pine Stand	1980	44°6′0″N 84°10′12″W	Roscommon	State	A large stand of old-growth red pine with a documented history of wildfires stretching back to 1798. Part of Au Sable State Forest.
Strangmoor Bog	1973	46°15′N 86°06′W	Schoolcraft	Federal	An undisturbed example of a string bog, one of the southernmost locations of this type of bog. Part of Seney National Wildlife Refuge.
Tobico Marsh	1976	43°41′51″N 83°56′11″W	Bay	State	A mixture of relatively undisturbed hardwood forest, open water and marshland, frequently used by migrating waterfowl. Part of Bay City Recreation Area.
Toumey Woodlot	1976	42°42′13.428″N 84°27′54.36″W	Ingham	State	One of southern Michigan's last virgin beech-maple forests; located on the Michigan State University campus and used for ecological research. Managed by Michigan State University.
Warren Woods Natural Area	1967	41°50′00″N 86°37′20″W	Berrien	Private	One of southern Michigan's last virgin beech-maple forests. Also includes sizable individual specimens of beech, maple and sycamore. Part of Warren Woods State Park.

== See also ==
- List of National Historic Landmarks in Michigan
