= Au Train Bay =

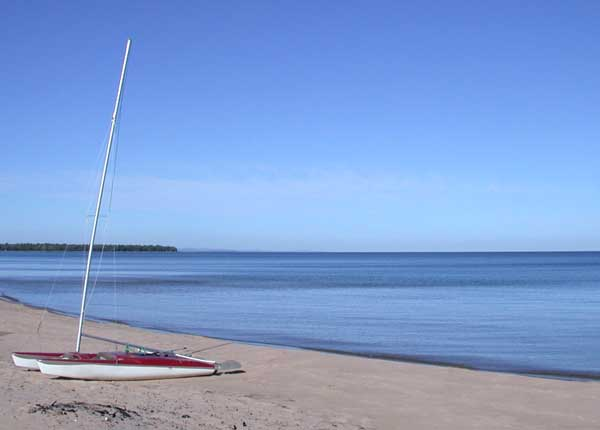
- Au Train Bay

- Location within Michigan
- Location: Alger County, Michigan
- Coordinates: 46°26′47″N 86°50′43″W
- Type: Bay
- Surface elevation: 604 feet (184 m)

Au Train Bay is a small bay, approximately 4 mi (6 km) across, on the southern shore of Lake Superior along the coast of Alger County in the Upper Peninsula of Michigan.

The town of Au Train sits along the middle of the south shore of the bay.
