= Limestone Township, Michigan =

- Civil township
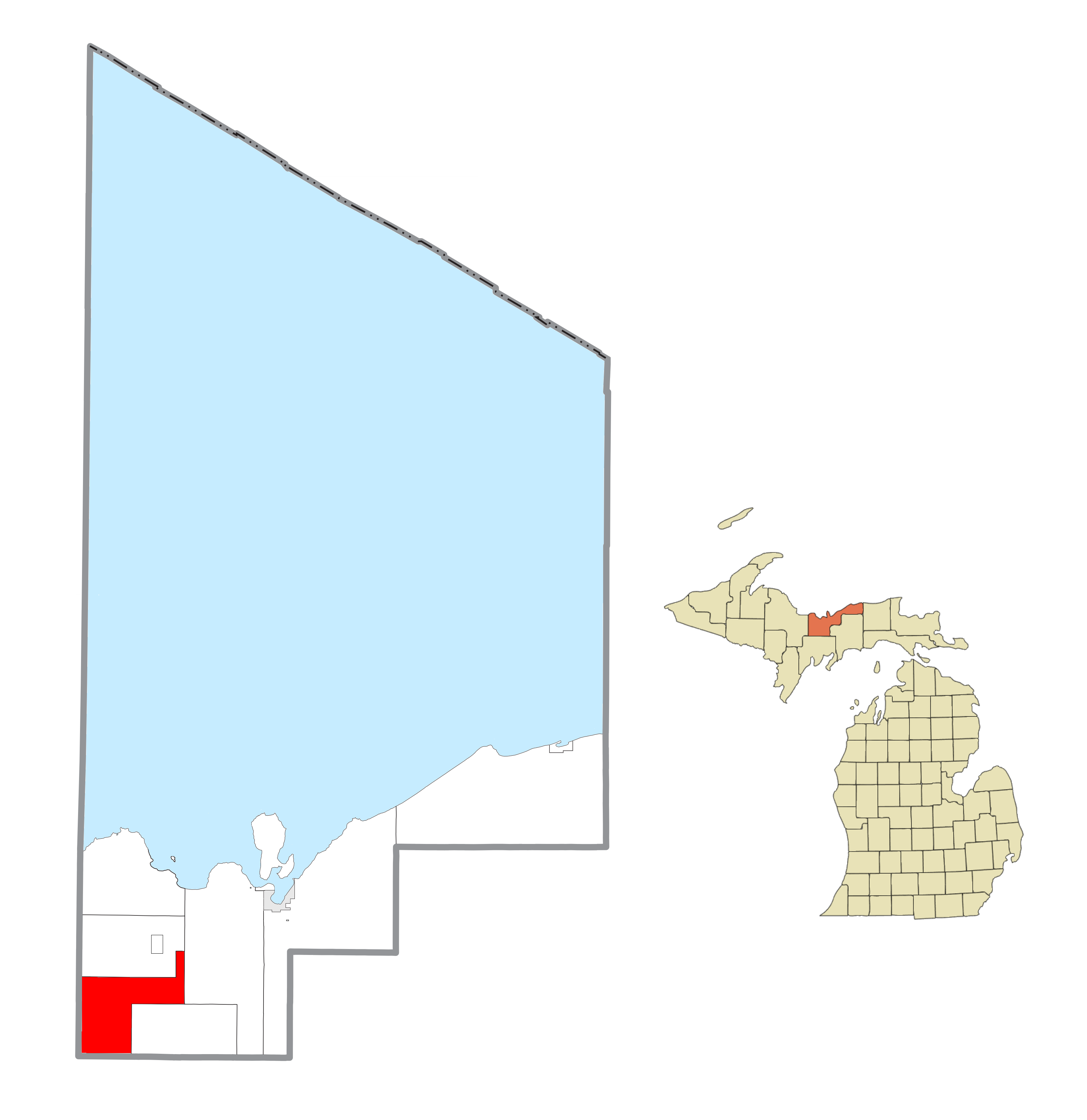
- Location within Alger County

- Location within the state of Michigan Location within the United States
- Coordinates: 46°13′45″N 87°01′02″W
- Country: United States
- State: Michigan
- County: Alger

Government
  - Supervisor: Thomas Curry
  - Clerk: Danita Rask

Area
  - Total: 75.2 sq mi (194.7 km^{2})
  - Land: 74.2 sq mi (192.2 km^{2})
  - Water: 0.93 sq mi (2.4 km^{2})
- Elevation: 932 ft (284 m)

Population (2020)
  - Total: 392
  - Density: 5.9/sq mi (2.3/km^{2})
- Time zone: UTC-5 (Eastern (EST))
  - Summer (DST): UTC-4 (EDT)
- ZIP code(s): 49816 (Chatham); 49878 (Rapid River); 49880 (Rock); 49891 (Trenary)
- Area code: 906
- FIPS code: 26-47540
- GNIS feature ID: 1626617
- Website: limestonetwpmi.org

Limestone Township is a civil township of Alger County in the U.S. state of Michigan. The population was 392 in 2020.

== Geography ==
According to the United States Census Bureau, the township has a total area of 75.2 square miles (194.7 km^{2}), of which 74.2 square miles (192.2 km^{2}) is land and 0.93 square miles (2.4 km^{2}), or 1.24%, is water.

=== Communities ===
There are no incorporated municipalities in the township. There are some historic locales and unincorporated communities:

- Diffin is just south of the West Branch Whitefish River and US 41 at 46°12′36″N 87°02′03″W. It was at the junction between two former railroad lines. The name was supposedly chosen for its brevity.
- Ladoga is a place at 46°16′55″N 87°03′18″W. It is a former sawmill settlement on the Chicago and North Western Transportation Company. The community was named after Lake Ladoga, in Russia.
- Limestone is an unincorporated community on M-67 about six miles (10 km) south of Chatham at 46°15′39″N 86°55′46″W. It was first settled in 1889. A post office was established on October 12, 1892, with John H. Johnson as the first postmaster. It was named for the limestone bed of Johnson Creek which flows through the area. The post office was discontinued on July 15, 1984.
- Kiva is an unincorporated community at 46°15′14″N 87°05′05″W. The Huber family were the first white settlers in the area in 1880, which was then known as Whitefish, due to its location on the Whitefish River, and later as West Limestone from its location in Limestone Township. A post office was established on December 11, 1915, named Kiva, after a shortened form of the name of the first postmaster, Sigrid Kivimaki. The office was discontinued on August 11, 1967.
- Traunik is an unincorporated community at the junction of county highways H-01 and H-44 on a branch of the Soo Line Railroad at 46°15′39″N 86°58′11″W. George Nickel homesteaded 160 acres (0.65 km^{2}) of land here in about 1895. The community began to grow rapidly in about 1910 with an influx of Slovene immigrants to work in area lumber camps. The place was first known as "Buckeye Landing" and "Buckeye Spur", after the Buckeye Land & Lumber Company. Storekeeper Louis Mikulich (Mikulič) became the first postmaster in July 1927 and renamed the town after the native Slovene village of many of the settlers, Travnik (not to be confused with the Bosnian city of Travnik).

== Demographics ==
Historical population
Census	Pop.	Note	%±
1960	330		—
1970	302		−8.5%
1980	373		23.5%
1990	334		−10.5%
2000	407		21.9%
2010	438		7.6%
Source: Census Bureau. Census 1960- 2000, 2010.

As of the census of 2000, there were 407 people, 174 households, and 124 families residing in the township. The population density was 5.5 inhabitants per square mile (2.1/km^{2}). There were 333 housing units at an average density of 4.5 per square mile (1.7/km^{2}). The racial makeup of the township was 94.84% White, 1.47% African American, 1.47% Native American, 0.98% from other races, and 1.23% from two or more races. Hispanic or Latinos of any race were 1.72% of the population. Culturally, 17.0% were of United States or American, 13.6% Finnish, 12.9% German, 10.6% Polish, 9.1% French and 6.1% English ancestry. In 2020, its population was 392.

In 2000, there were 174 households, out of which 25.3% had children under the age of 18 living with them, 63.8% were married couples living together, 5.2% had a female householder with no husband present, and 28.2% were non-families. 24.1% of all households were made up of individuals, and 8.6% had someone living alone who was 65 years of age or older. The average household size was 2.34 and the average family size was 2.77.

In the township the population was spread out, with 21.4% under the age of 18, 3.7% from 18 to 24, 24.3% from 25 to 44, 34.9% from 45 to 64, and 15.7% who were 65 years of age or older. The median age was 46 years. For every 100 females, there were 89.3 males. For every 100 females age 18 and over, there were 97.5 males.

In 2000, the median income for a household in the township was $35,938, and the median income for a family was $37,981. Males had a median income of $36,094 versus $21,750 for females. The per capita income for the township was $15,384. About 7.8% of families and 9.0% of the population were below the poverty line, including 15.6% of those under age 18 and none of those age 65 or over.
