= Onota Township, Michigan =

- Civil township
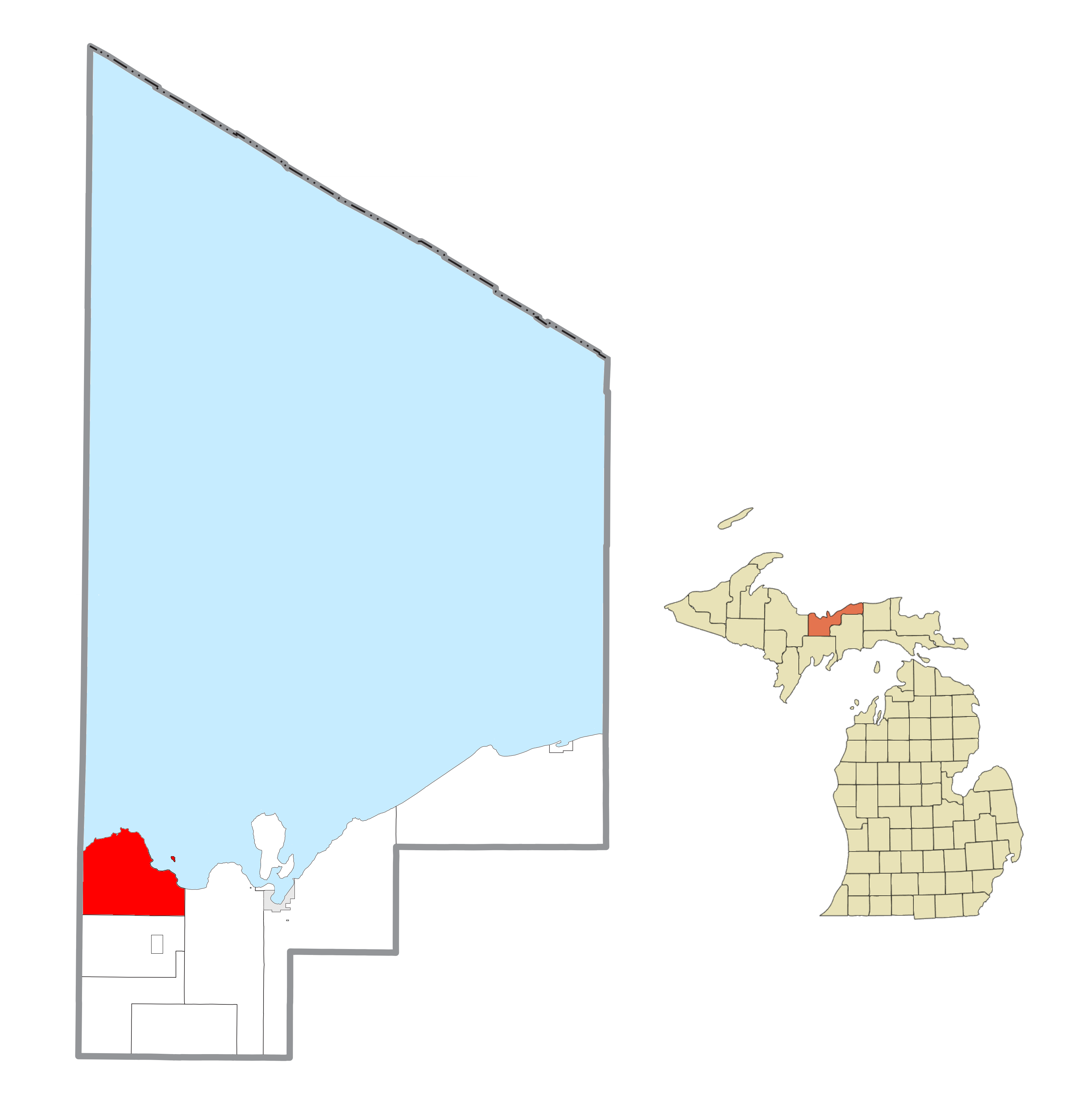
- Location within Alger County

- Location within the state of Michigan Location within the United States
- Coordinates: 46°28′37″N 86°59′24″W
- Country: United States
- State: Michigan
- County: Alger

Government
  - Supervisor: Terry Pihlainen
  - Clerk: Vacant

Area
  - Total: 103.6 sq mi (268.3 km^{2})
  - Land: 87.7 sq mi (227.2 km^{2})
  - Water: 15.9 sq mi (41.1 km^{2})
- Elevation: 748 ft (228 m)

Population (2020)
  - Total: 371
  - Density: 4.01/sq mi (1.55/km^{2})
- Time zone: UTC-5 (Eastern (EST))
  - Summer (DST): UTC-4 (EDT)
- ZIP code(s): 49806 (Au Train); 49822 (Deerton); 49885 (Skandia)
- Area code: 906
- FIPS code: 26-60820
- GNIS feature ID: 1626850
- Website: Official website

Onota Township is a civil township of Alger County in the U.S. state of Michigan. As of 2020, its population was 371.

== Geography ==
According to the United States Census Bureau, the township has a total area of 103.6 square miles (268.3 km^{2}), of which 87.7 square miles (227.2 km^{2}) is land and 15.9 square miles (41.1 km^{2}), or 15.31%, is water.

=== Communities ===
There are no incorporated municipalities in the township.

- Deerton is an unincorporated community at 46°28′28″N 87°02′31″W. Deerton began as a station on the Detroit, Mackinac and Marquette Railroad in 1882. A post office has been in operation there since 1922.
- Rock River is an unincorporated community on M-28 near the mouth of the Rock River at 46°27′50″N 86°54′48″W This is distinct from Rock River Township, which is adjacent to the south of Onota Township. The settlement was a station on the Detroit, Mackinac and Marquette Railroad in 1882 at charcoal kilns near the mouth of the Rock River. A post office was established on February 20, 1886, with John H. Johnson as its first postmaster. The office closed on May 25, 1898, but was restored on October 19, 1898, and continued to operate until June 15, 1906. Various locations along the Rock River have been given this name.
- Sand River is an unincorporated community on M-28 near the mouth of the Sand River at 46°29′26″N 87°06′57″W The community is on the western boundary of the township and is partially in Chocolay Township in Marquette County. It began as a station on the Detroit, Mackinac and Marquette Railroad in 1882. A post office named Sand River was established in Alger County on March 14, 1891, with Charles A. Hazen as its first postmaster. The office was transferred to Marquette County on September 12, 1908, and closed on December 31, 1911. From 1904 through 1908 it was a winter post office.
- Tyoga was a former post office and a station on the Duluth, South Shore and Atlantic Railway at 46°29′40″N 87°02′35″W. The settlement formed around the mill and general store of the Tyoga Lumber Company. A post office was established on February 15, 1906, with John W. Bailey as postmaster. The office closed on July 31, 1907. Tyoga now hosts a guided pathway detailing the settlement history of the site.

== Demographics ==
Historical population
Census	Pop.	Note	%±
1960	182		—
1970	128		−29.7%
1980	228		78.1%
1990	244		7.0%
2000	310		27.0%
2010	352		13.5%
Source: Census Bureau. Census 1960- 2000, 2010.

In 2010, there were 352 people, 108 households, and 69 families residing in the township. In 2020, its population grew to 371.

According to the 2010 census, its population density was 3.6 per square mile (1.4/km^{2}) and the racial makeup of the township was 96.5% White, 2% identified by two or more races, and the remainder as less than 1% of each of the following: Native American, Asian, and other.

In 2010, there were 108 households, out of which 18.5% had children under the age of 18 living with them, 57.4% were married couples living together, 5.6% had a female householder with no husband present, and 36.1% were non-families. 30.6% of all households were made up of individuals, and 10.2% had someone living alone who was 65 years of age or older. The average household size was 2.04 and the average family size was 2.52.

In the township, the population was spread out, with 9.9% under the age of 18, 9.1% from 20 to 34, 14.2% from 35 to 49, 37% from 50 to 64, and 29.3% who were 65 years of age or older. There were 184 females, with a median age of 51; and 168 males, with a median age of 54.4.

At the 2010 census, the median income for a household in the township was $37,708, and the median income for a family was $38,333. Males had a median income of $52,000 versus $39,583 for females. The per capita income for the township was $24,267. About 13% of families and 21.6% of the population were below the poverty line, including up to 50% of those under age 18 and 7.7% of those age 65 or over. At the 2021 census estimates, its median household income was $68,750.
