= Bay Furnace, Michigan =

Town in Alger County, Michigan

Coordinates: 46°26′30.4″N 86°42′20.1″W

Bay Furnace was a town in Alger County, Michigan west of Munising, Michigan. It was established in 1869 around a blast furnace run by the Bay Furnace Company and used to make iron ore into pig iron.

The town that was established around the furnace was originally named Onota. The name changed later to Bismark, and then changed again to Bay Furnace. The town had a population of approximately 500.

When Schoolcraft County was established out of Marquette County, Bay Furnace was its county seat. In 1885, Bay Furnace was reorganized into the newly established Alger County.

The town was destroyed by an accidental fire started by a wagonload of charcoal on May 31, 1877. The furnace and surrounding land were given to the United States Forest Service in 1940.

== Sources ==
- Romig, Walter (1986). Michigan Place Names. Detroit: Wayne State University Press. p. 47. ISBN 978-0-8143-1838-6 – via Google Books.
