= H-13 (Michigan county highway) =

County highway and forest highway in Michigan, United States

H-13 / Federal Forest Highway 13
- H-13/FFH-13 highlighted in red

Route information
- Maintained by DCRC, ACRC and SCRC
- Length: 36.192 mi (58.245 km)
- Existed: c. 1972–present

Major junctions
- South end: US 2 near Nahma Junction
- M-28 / M-94 in Wetmore
- North end: H-58 in Munising Township

Location
- Country: United States
- State: Michigan
- Counties: Delta, Alger, Schoolcraft

Highway system
- County-Designated Highways
- Forest Highway System
← H-11	→ H-15

H-13 is a county-designated highway in the Upper Peninsula of the US state of Michigan that runs north–south for approximately 36.2 miles (58.3 km) between Nahma Junction in Delta County and the Munising area in Alger County. The highway is also signed as Federal Forest Highway 13 (FFH-13), a Federal Forest Highway between Nahma Junction and Wetmore. The roadway runs through rural national forest lands providing access to several campgrounds and parks. The area contains several lakes as well. The Forest Highway System dates back to the 1920s, and an earthen roadway was present along the route of FFH-13 by the 1930s. It was paved by the late 1940s and added to the county-designated highway system in the 1970s. A section of H-13 in Alger County originally continued north to Miners Castle, but the roadway designation was truncated in the first decade of the 21st century.

== Route description ==
H-13/FFH-13 starts at an intersection with US Highway 2 (US 2) west of Moss Lake. The roadway runs north crossing a line of the Canadian National Railway. It heads through the Hiawatha National Forest, running parallel to the Sturgeon River. H-13/FFH-13 crosses the river near the Flowing Well National Forest Campground on a T-beam bridge built in 1941. The road meanders from there northeasterly through rural Delta County forests, passing to the west of Dana and Skeels lakes and crossing several small streams. It crosses into the southeastern corner of Alger County near Straits Lake. The road continues northeasterly and then meanders back and forth along the Alger–Schoolcraft county line in an area dotted with several lakes.

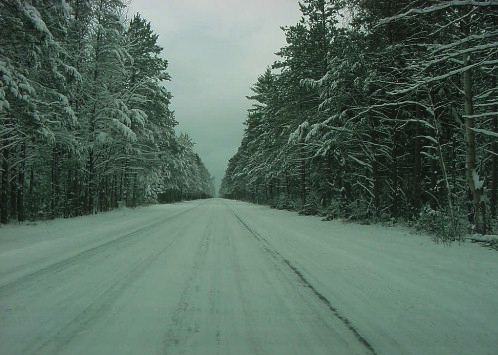
H-13/FFH-13 during the winter

H-13/FFH-13 crosses east into Schoolcraft County completely and provides access to the Pete's Lake National Forest Campground near the lake of the same name. The road shifts back westerly to follow the county line near the Widewaters National Forest Campground; from here north the forest highway will follow the county line north to the northwestern corner of Schoolcraft County. Along the way, H-13 meets the southern terminus of the unsigned H-09. Once the road crosses back into Alger County completely, it provides access to Wagner Falls State Park and passes Hanley Field, a private airport south of Wetmore. The forest highway crosses another branch of the Canadian National Railway south of the junction with M-28/M-94 in Wetmore. At that junction, the FFH-13 designation ends and H-13 continues north as a gravel surface along Connors Road through Munising Township. The county road ends at the intersection with H-58 (Munising–Van Meer–Shingleton Road) in the Pictured Rocks National Lakeshore. As a county-designated highway, H-13 is maintained by the county road commissions of Delta, Alger and Schoolcraft counties (DCRC, ACRC and SCRC respectively) with support for the FFH-13 segment as part of the Forest Highway System that is funded and administered by the United States Forest Service and the Federal Highway Administration. H-13/FFH-13 forms a major north–south artery for the Hiawatha National Forest.

== History ==
The Forest Highway System was created by the Federal Aid Highway Act of 1921. An earthen road was present along the route of H-13 by the middle of 1936. Later that year, the segment along the Alger–Schoolcraft county line was built as a gravel road, and Miners Castle Road was upgraded to gravel as well. Additional segments were under construction in 1940 in Delta County and south of Wetmore. During World War II, the gravel surface was downgraded to earth along Miners Castle Road. The rest of the modern H-13 was paved in 1948 or 1949.

The county-designated highway system was created around October 5, 1970, when the state approved the system. The H-13 designation debuted in 1972 between Nahma Junction and H-58; H-13 turned east and ran concurrently with H-58 before turning north on Miners Castle Road. The northernmost segment was paved in 1987, completing the paving along the entire route. The H-58 concurrency was removed in 2004 when the northern segment of H-13 along Miners Castle Road was redesignated H-11.

== Major intersections ==
County	Location	mi	km	Destinations	Notes
Delta	Nahma Junction	0.000	0.000	US 2 / LMCT – Escanaba, Manistique	
Alger	No major junctions				
Schoolcraft	No major junctions				
Alger–Schoolcraft county line	Munising–Hiawatha township line	26.211	42.183	H-09 north	H-09 is unsigned
Alger	Wetmore	33.572	54.029	M-28 / M-94 / LSCT – Munising, Newberry	Northern end of FFH-13 signage
Alger	Munising Township	36.192	58.245	H-58 – Munising, Grand Marais	
1.000 mi = 1.609 km; 1.000 km = 0.621 mi
