= Dukes Research Natural Area =

Forest in Michigan, United States

- Location within Michigan
- Location: Marquette County, Michigan
- Nearest city: Chatham
- Coordinates: 46.35°N 87.16667°W
- Area: 233 acres (0.94 km^{2})

U.S. National Natural Landmark
- Designated: 1974

The Dukes Research Natural Area is a 233-acre (0.94 km^{2}) tract of northern hardwood forest located within the 5,000-acre (20 km^{2}) Upper Peninsula Experimental Forest, a unit of the Hiawatha National Forest in the Upper Peninsula of the U.S. state of Michigan. The Dukes Research Natural Area was listed in 1974 as a National Natural Landmark by the U.S. Department of the Interior.

== Ecology ==
The National Park Service describes the Upper Peninsula Experimental Forest as "an undisturbed white cedar and mixed conifer swamp containing old-growth hardwood stands." The Dukes Research Natural Area consists of several hardwood stands that grow on relatively higher, well-drained elevations within the swamp tract. The U.S. Forest Service (USFS) describes the Natural Area as an example of "well-stocked, mature northern hardwood forests that have been undisturbed for over 90 years." Prior to 1920, the ecology of the Upper Peninsula was extensively altered by logging.

The USFS notes the presence of black ash, yellow birch, American elm, eastern hemlock, red maple, and sugar maple in the National Natural Landmark.

== Today ==
The Upper Peninsula Experimental Forest and its Dukes Research Natural Area are located on M-94 near the extreme eastern edge of Marquette County. They are located approximately 10 miles (16 km) west of Chatham.

The 233-acre (0.94 km^{2}) Dukes Research Natural Area currently serves as a control plot for the experimental forest. Logging continues in the experimental forest.

The presence of mature stands in the Natural Area of several of the tree species enumerated, including black ash, American elm, and eastern hemlock, are of special significance because of damage done to these species of trees in other parts of their historic ranges by parasitical invasive species.
