= Sheridan Charter Township, Michigan =

- Charter township
- Location within the state of Michigan
- Coordinates: 43°25′52″N 85°58′14″W
- Country: United States
- State: Michigan
- County: Newaygo

Area
  - Total: 33.2 sq mi (86.0 km^{2})
  - Land: 33.2 sq mi (85.9 km^{2})
  - Water: 0.039 sq mi (0.1 km^{2})
- Elevation: 748 ft (228 m)

Population (2020)
  - Total: 2,518
  - Density: 75.9/sq mi (29.3/km^{2})
- Time zone: UTC-5 (Eastern (EST))
  - Summer (DST): UTC-4 (EDT)
- FIPS code: 26-73120
- GNIS feature ID: 1627069
- Website: https://www.sheridanchartertownship.com/

Sheridan Charter Township is a charter township of Newaygo County in the U.S. state of Michigan. The population was 2,518 at the 2020 census.

== Geography ==
According to the United States Census Bureau, the township has a total area of 33.2 square miles (86 km^{2}), of which 33.2 square miles (86 km^{2}) is land and 0.04 square miles (0.10 km^{2}) (0.06%) is water.

Sheridan Township borders the southern end of Fremont Lake, just south of Fremont. The Township hall is located next to the water off 64th Street, and the Township operates a boat launch there.

== Communities ==
- Brookside was a village located at the center of Sheridan Township. It had a post office from 1890 until 1901.

== Demographics ==
As of the census of 2000, there were 2,423 people, 842 households, and 666 families residing in the township. The population density was 73.0 inhabitants per square mile (28.2/km^{2}). There were 950 housing units at an average density of 28.6 per square mile (11.0/km^{2}). The racial makeup of the township was 96.00% White, 0.29% African American, 0.54% Native American, 0.29% Asian, 1.32% from other races, and 1.57% from two or more races. Hispanic or Latino of any race were 3.30% of the population.

There were 842 households, out of which 37.9% had children under the age of 18 living with them, 70.1% were married couples living together, 6.4% had a female householder with no husband present, and 20.8% were non-families. 17.8% of all households were made up of individuals, and 6.5% had someone living alone who was 65 years of age or older. The average household size was 2.84 and the average family size was 3.20.

In the township the population was spread out, with 31.2% under the age of 18, 6.9% from 18 to 24, 26.3% from 25 to 44, 24.1% from 45 to 64, and 11.5% who were 65 years of age or older. The median age was 36 years. For every 100 females, there were 97.2 males. For every 100 females age 18 and over, there were 94.2 males.

The median income for a household in the township was $41,875, and the median income for a family was $52,431. Males had a median income of $32,563 versus $27,800 for females. The per capita income for the township was $21,834. About 5.4% of families and 7.7% of the population were below the poverty line, including 12.4% of those under age 18 and 5.7% of those age 65 or over.
