= Au Train Township, Michigan =

- Civil township
- Emblem

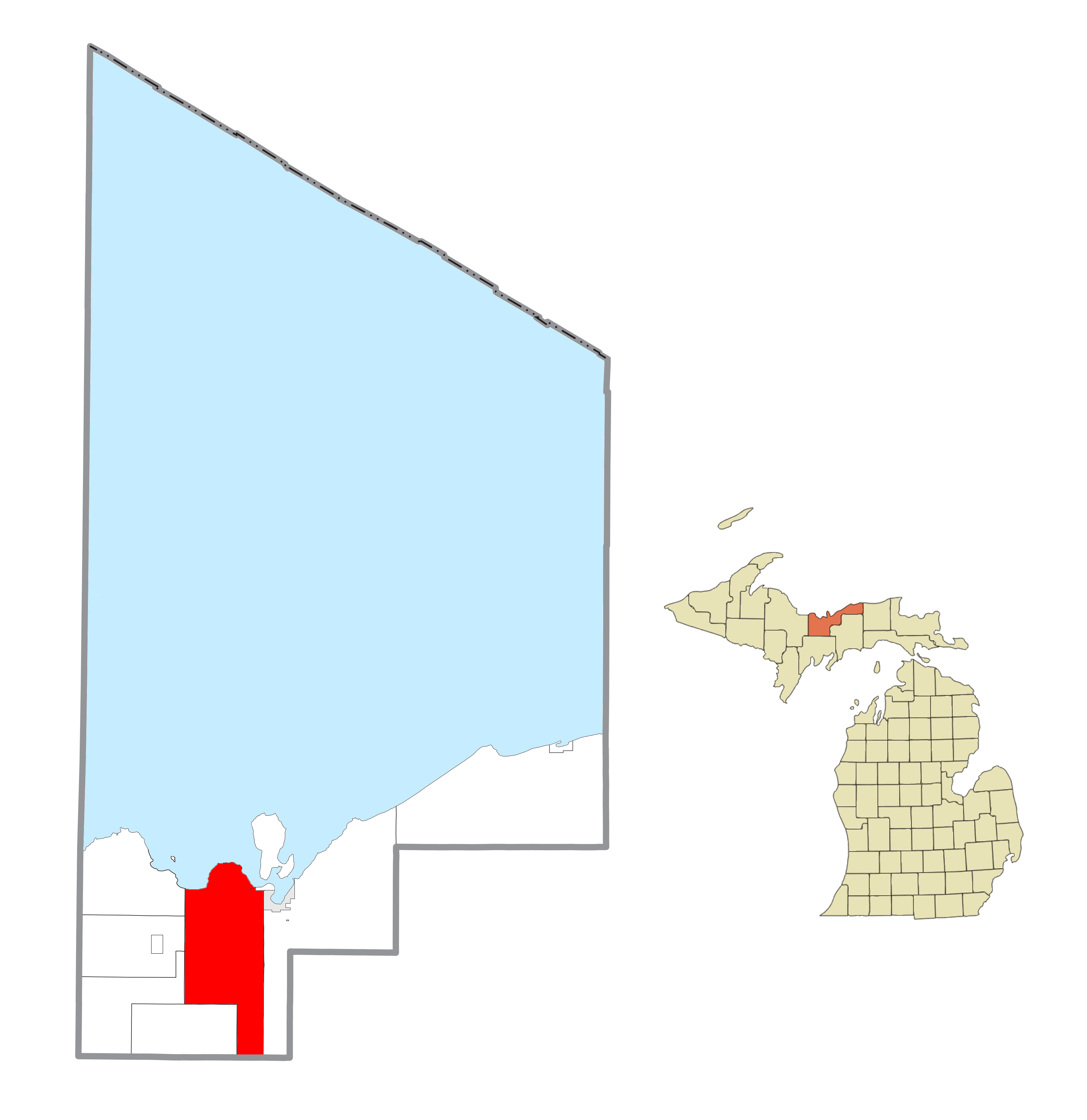
- Location within Alger County

- Location in the state of Michigan Location within the United States
- Coordinates: 46°21′11″N 86°45′07″W
- Country: United States
- State: Michigan
- County: Alger

Government
  - Supervisor: Michelle Doucette
  - Clerk: Mary Johnson

Area
  - Total: 158.04 sq mi (409.3 km^{2})
  - Land: 141.27 sq mi (365.9 km^{2})
  - Water: 16.77 sq mi (43.4 km^{2})
- Elevation: 974 ft (297 m)

Population (2020)
  - Total: 1,019
  - Density: 8.06/sq mi (3.11/km^{2})
- Time zone: UTC-5 (Eastern (EST))
  - Summer (DST): UTC-4 (EDT)
- ZIP code(s): 49806 (Au Train); 49816 (Chatham); 49862 (Munising); 49895 (Wetmore)
- Area code: 906
- FIPS code: 26-04460
- GNIS feature ID: 1625869
- Website: Official website

Au Train Township is a civil township of Alger County in the U.S. state of Michigan. As of the 2020 census, its population was 1,019.

== History ==
Forest Lake village was founded by the Cleveland Cliffs Company in 1890 and first called "Dixon". At Coalwood, a post office opened on September 21, 1906. On July 15, 1910, the Coalwood Post Office closed. The Dixon post office was established in May 1915 and was renamed to and possibly moved to Forest Lake in November 1921. The Forest Lake Post Office was discontinued in 1984.

== Geography ==
According to the United States Census Bureau, the township has a total area of 158.0 square miles (409.3 km^{2}), of which 141.3 square miles (365.9 km^{2}) is land and 16.8 square miles (43.5 km^{2}), or 10.62%, is water.

=== Communities ===
There are no incorporated villages in the township. The city of Munising is adjacent, at the northeast corner. There are some unincorporated communities and historic locales in the township:

- Au Train is south of M-28 and west of the Au Train River near Au Train Bay in Lake Superior (46°25′49″N 86°50′13″W; Elevation: 610 ft./186 m.).
- Coalwood is on M-94 near Stillman and Wyman roads (46°20′26″N 86°43′54″W; Elevation: 1007 ft./307 m.). A post office operated from September 21, 1906, until July 15, 1910.
- Christmas is a small unincorporated community in the northeast of the township.
- Dixon is on M-94 and Au Train Forest Lake Road near the west side of the north end of Cleveland Cliff Basin (46°19′57″N 86°51′11″W ; Elevation: 791 ft./241 m.).
- Forest Lake is located on M-94 near the east side of the north end of Cleveland Cliff Basin (46°19′58″N 86°50′16″W; Elevation: 830 ft./253 m.), and a station on the M.M. & S. Railroad. The village was founded by the Cleveland Cliffs Company in 1890 and first called "Dixon". A post office named Dixon was established in May 1915 and renamed as Forest Lake in November 1921. The office was discontinued in 1984.
- Munising Junction is located west of M-94 on Perch Lake Road (46°22′45″N 86°42′36″W; Elevation: 801 ft./244 m.).
- Ridge is located at Ridge Road and the Duluth, South Shore and Atlantic Railway Rail Trail (46°24′02″N 86°45′15″W).
- Stillman is a place at 46°20′33″N 86°45′04″W.
- Vail is a place at 46°20′12″N 86°46′22″W.

=== Climate ===
Climate data for Au Train, Michigan
Month	Jan	Feb	Mar	Apr	May	Jun	Jul	Aug	Sep	Oct	Nov	Dec	Year
Record high °F (°C)	50 (10)	56 (13)	73 (23)	89 (32)	92 (33)	99 (37)	101 (38)	99 (37)	93 (34)	87 (31)	75 (24)	59 (15)	101 (38)
Mean daily maximum °F (°C)	25 (−4)	29 (−2)	37 (3)	50 (10)	64 (18)	74 (23)	78 (26)	76 (24)	69 (21)	55 (13)	41 (5)	29 (−2)	52 (11)
Mean daily minimum °F (°C)	7 (−14)	7 (−14)	16 (−9)	28 (−2)	38 (3)	47 (8)	53 (12)	52 (11)	45 (7)	35 (2)	24 (−4)	12 (−11)	30 (−1)
Record low °F (°C)	−25 (−32)	−30 (−34)	−34 (−37)	−5 (−21)	17 (−8)	22 (−6)	31 (−1)	31 (−1)	22 (−6)	17 (−8)	0 (−18)	−21 (−29)	−34 (−37)
Average precipitation inches (mm)	1.65 (42)	1.48 (38)	1.66 (42)	2.15 (55)	3.05 (77)	3.02 (77)	3.41 (87)	3.17 (81)	4.21 (107)	4.47 (114)	3.00 (76)	2.13 (54)	30.35 (771)
Source: The Weather Channel

== Demographics ==
Historical population
Census	Pop.	Note	%±
1960	508		—
1970	545		7.3%
1980	928		70.3%
1990	1,047		12.8%
2000	1,172		11.9%
2010	1,138		−2.9%
Source: Census Bureau. Census 1960- 2000, 2010.

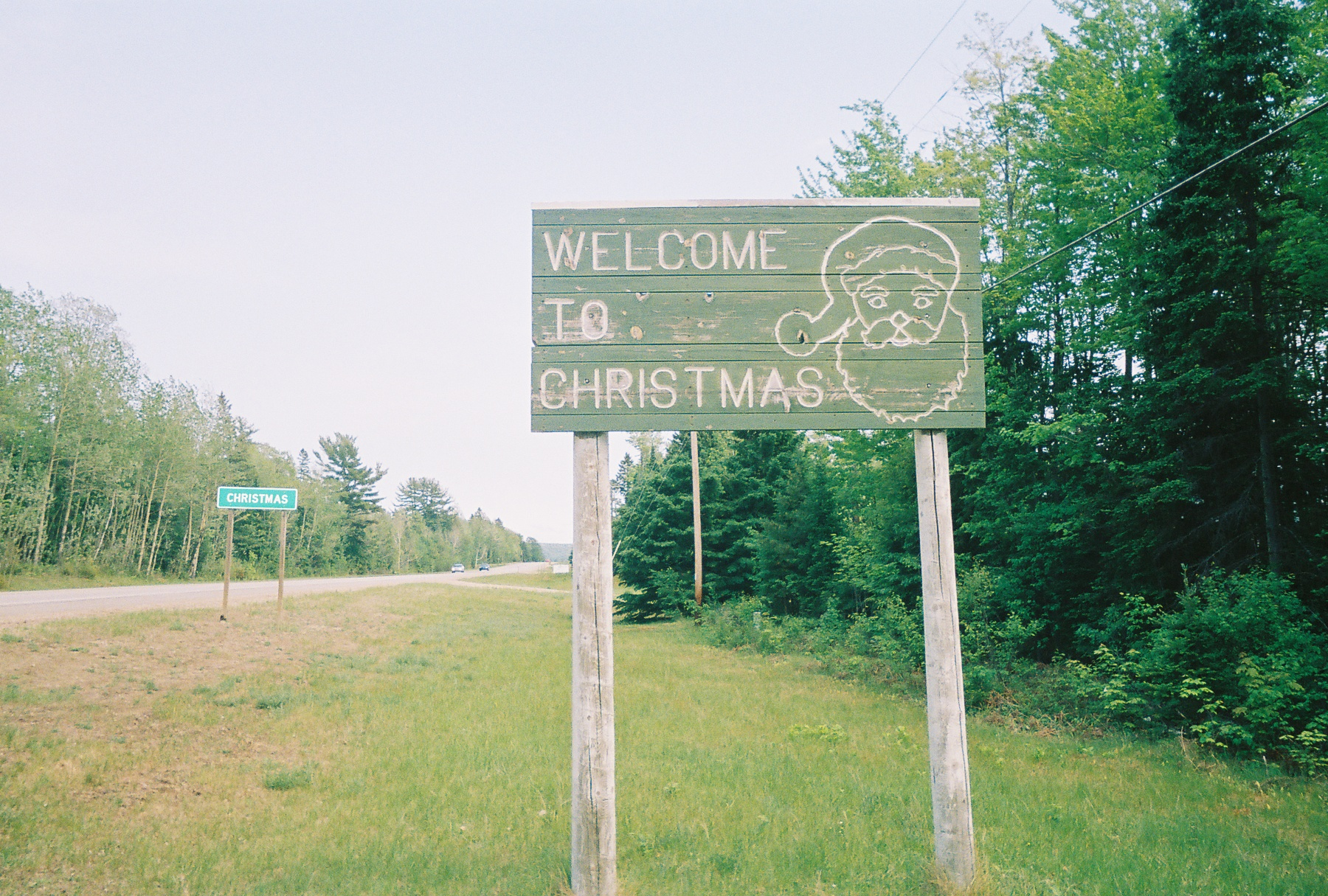
Community of Christmas within Au Train Township

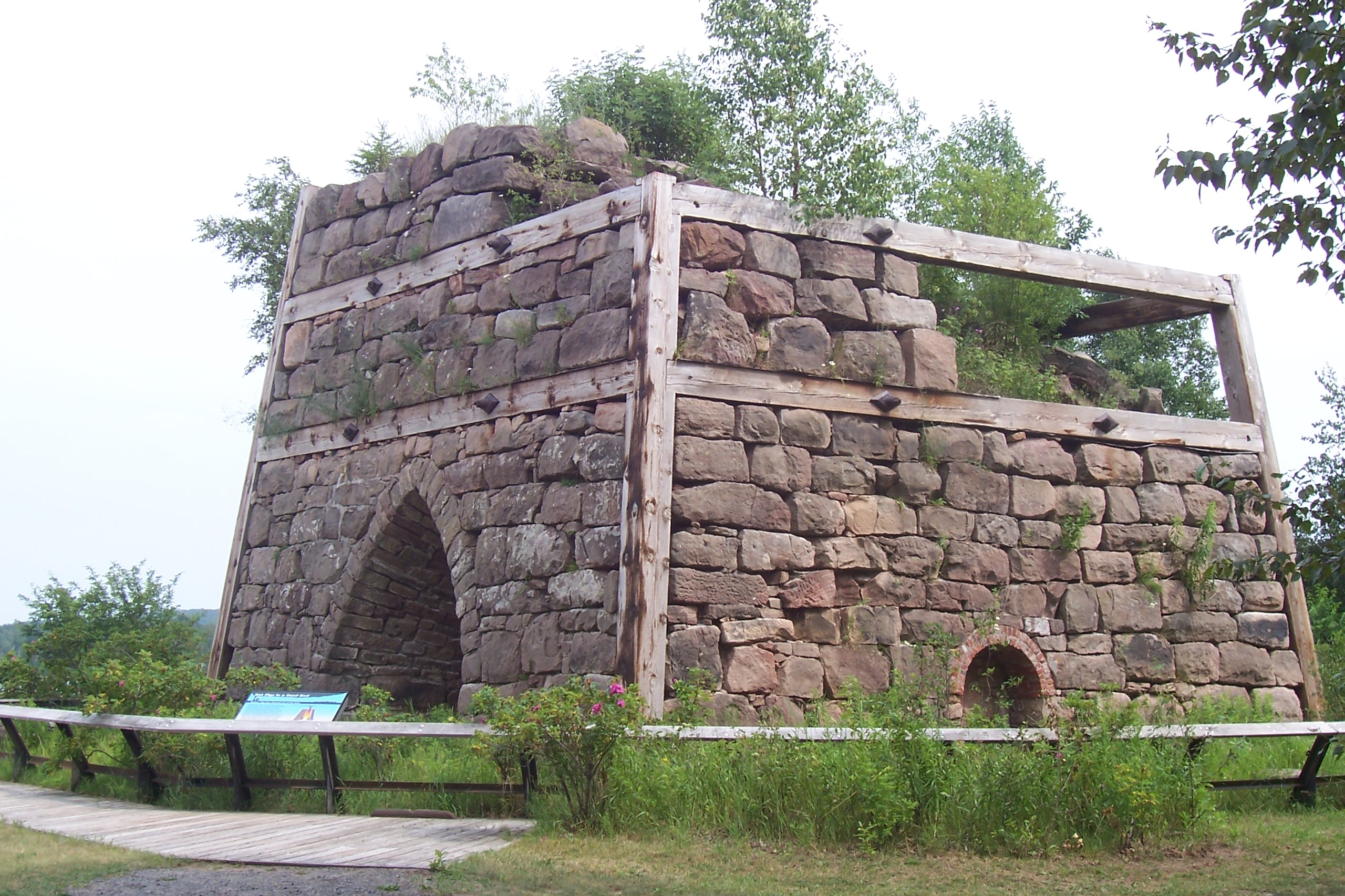
Onota Bay Furnace

In 2000, there were 1,172 people, 494 households, and 348 families residing in the township. The population density was 8.3 inhabitants per square mile (3.2/km^{2}). There were 991 housing units at an average density of 7.0 per square mile (2.7/km^{2}). The racial makeup of the township was 92.24% White, 4.69% Native American, 0.17% from other races, and 2.90% from two or more races. Hispanic or Latinos of any race were 0.94% of the population. Culturally, 16.0% were of German, 12.4% French, 10.7% English, 10.2% Finnish, 8.3% United States or American, 7.0% Swedish, 6.0% Polish and 5.1% French Canadian ancestry. By 2020, the township had a population of 1,019.

In 2000, there were 494 households, out of which 28.1% had children under the age of 18 living with them, 61.7% were married couples living together, 6.9% had a female householder with no husband present, and 29.4% were non-families. 23.7% of all households were made up of individuals, and 7.7% had someone living alone who was 65 years of age or older. The average household size was 2.37 and the average family size was 2.81.

In the township the population was spread out, with 22.7% under the age of 18, 5.8% from 18 to 24, 26.8% from 25 to 44, 30.1% from 45 to 64, and 14.6% who were 65 years of age or older. The median age was 42 years. For every 100 females, there were 99.3 males. For every 100 females age 18 and over, there were 100.4 males.

In 2000, the median income for a household in the township was $40,331, and the median income for a family was $42,857. Males had a median income of $36,563 versus $24,844 for females. The per capita income for the township was $18,751. About 8.1% of families and 10.2% of the population were below the poverty line, including 7.7% of those under age 18 and 6.7% of those age 65 or over. In 2021, the median income for a household in the township was $59,688.
