= Skandia Township, Michigan =

- Civil township
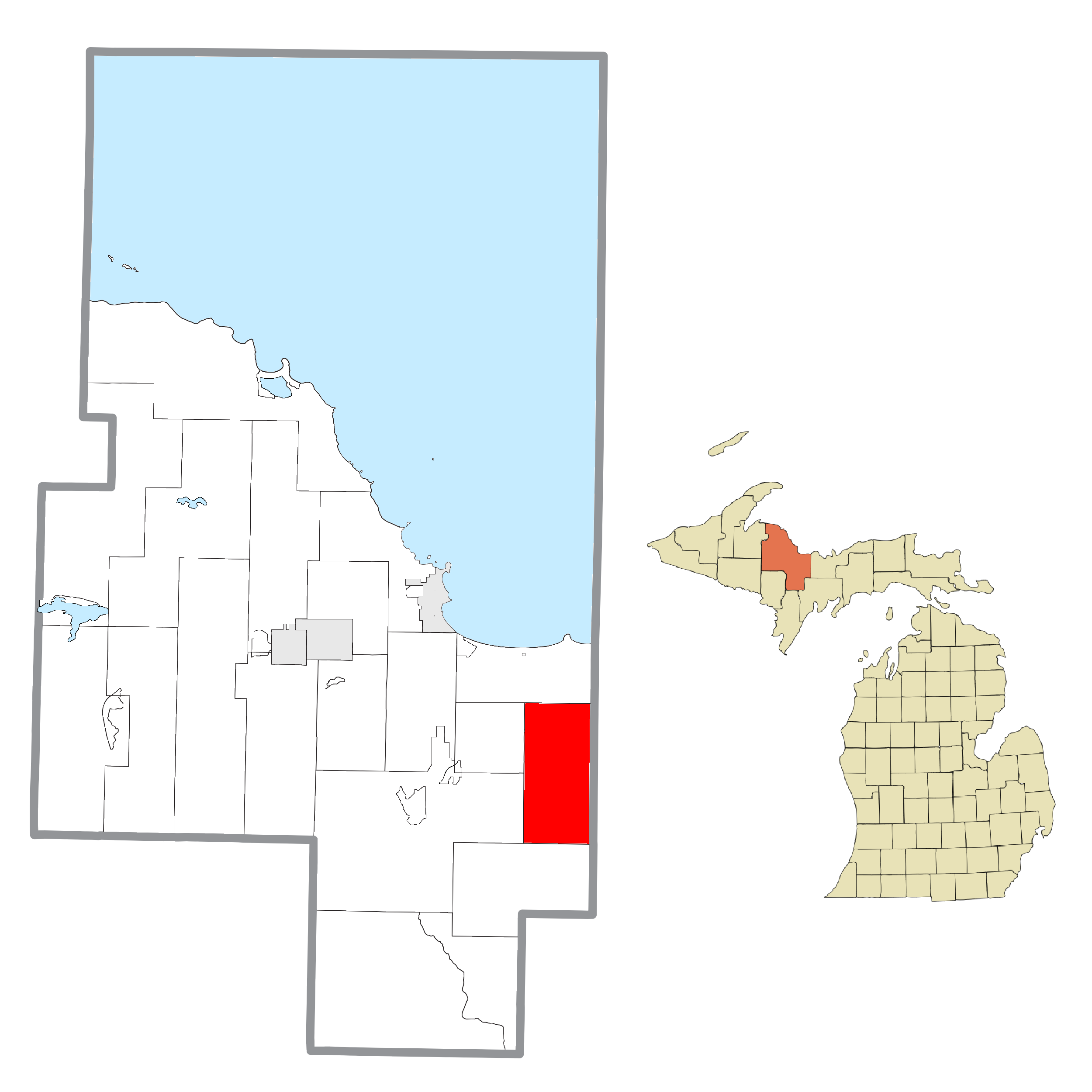
- Location within Marquette County

- Location within Michigan Location within the United States
- Coordinates: 46°21′27″N 87°12′03″W
- Country: United States
- State: Michigan
- County: Marquette

Government
  - Supervisor: Arthur Lauren
  - Clerk: Marilyn Keto

Area
  - Total: 72.10 sq mi (186.7 km^{2})
  - Land: 71.92 sq mi (186.3 km^{2})
  - Water: 0.18 sq mi (0.47 km^{2})
- Elevation: 1,099 ft (335 m)

Population (2020)
  - Total: 810
  - Density: 11.3/sq mi (4.4/km^{2})
- Time zone: UTC-5 (Eastern (EST))
  - Summer (DST): UTC-4 (EDT)
- ZIP Code: 49885 (Skandia)
- Area code: 906
- FIPS code: 26-103-74110
- GNIS feature ID: 1627085
- Website: skandiatownship.org

Skandia Township is a civil township of Marquette County in the U.S. state of Michigan. The 2020 census recorded a population of 810 people. The township contains the Dukes Research Natural Area, a National Natural Landmark.

== Geography ==
The township is on the eastern edge of Marquette County, bordered to the east by Alger County. According to the United States Census Bureau, the township has a total area of 72.10 square miles (186.74 km^{2}), of which 71.92 square miles (186.27 km^{2}) are land and 0.18 square miles (0.47 km^{2}), or 0.25%, are water.

== Communities ==
- Carlshend is an unincorporated community in the township. It was founded in 1893 by Karl Petros Janssen also known as Carl Peter Johnson. He wanted to name it "Carlslund" but the post office mangled it into its current name.
- Dukes is an unincorporated community in the township. It began around a railroad station in 1926 and was largely settled by Finnish immigrants. The settlers themselves named it Lehtola. It was given a post office in 1929 which operated periodically until 1963.
- Lawson is an unincorporated community in the township.
- Maple Grove is an unincorporated community in the township.
- Selma is an unincorporated community in the township.
- Skandia is an unincorporated community on the western edge of the township.
- Vick is an unincorporated community in the township.

== Demographics ==
As of the census of 2010, there were 826 people, 350 households, and 242 families residing in the township. The population density was 11.4 per square mile (4.4/km^{2}). There were 478 housing units at an average density of 6.6 per square mile (2.6/km^{2}). The racial makeup of the township was 93.5% White, 2.4% American Indian, 0.6% Asian, 0.1% Black or African American, 0% from other races, and 3.4% from two or more races. Hispanic or Latino of any race were 0.6% of the population.

There were 350 households, out of which 26.9% had children under the age of 18 living with them, 60.0% were married couples living together, 6.6% had a female householder with no husband present, and 30.9% were non-families. 25.1% of all households were made up of individuals, and 11.8% had someone living alone who was 65 years of age or older. The average household size was 2.36 and the average family size was 2.82.

In the township the population was spread out, with 23% under the age of 19, 15% from 20 to 34, 11.8% from 35 to 44, 35.3% from 45 to 64, and 14.9% who were 65 years of age or older. The median age was 45.1 years. As of 2010, the population was 49.2% female and 50.8% male.

In 2015 median income for a household in the township was $42,841 and the median income for a family was $55,313. Median earnings for workers was $26,316. Males working full-time, year-round had a median income of $53,125 versus $42,375 for females working full-time, year-round. The per capita income for the township was $16,941. About 11.9% of families and 16.5% of the population were below the poverty line, including 11.6% of those under age 18 and 13.4% of those age 65 or over.

== Notable people ==
- William Lincoln Bakewell, Antarctic explorer
- Mike Shaw, pro wrestler
