= Alger County, Michigan =

County in Michigan, United States

- County
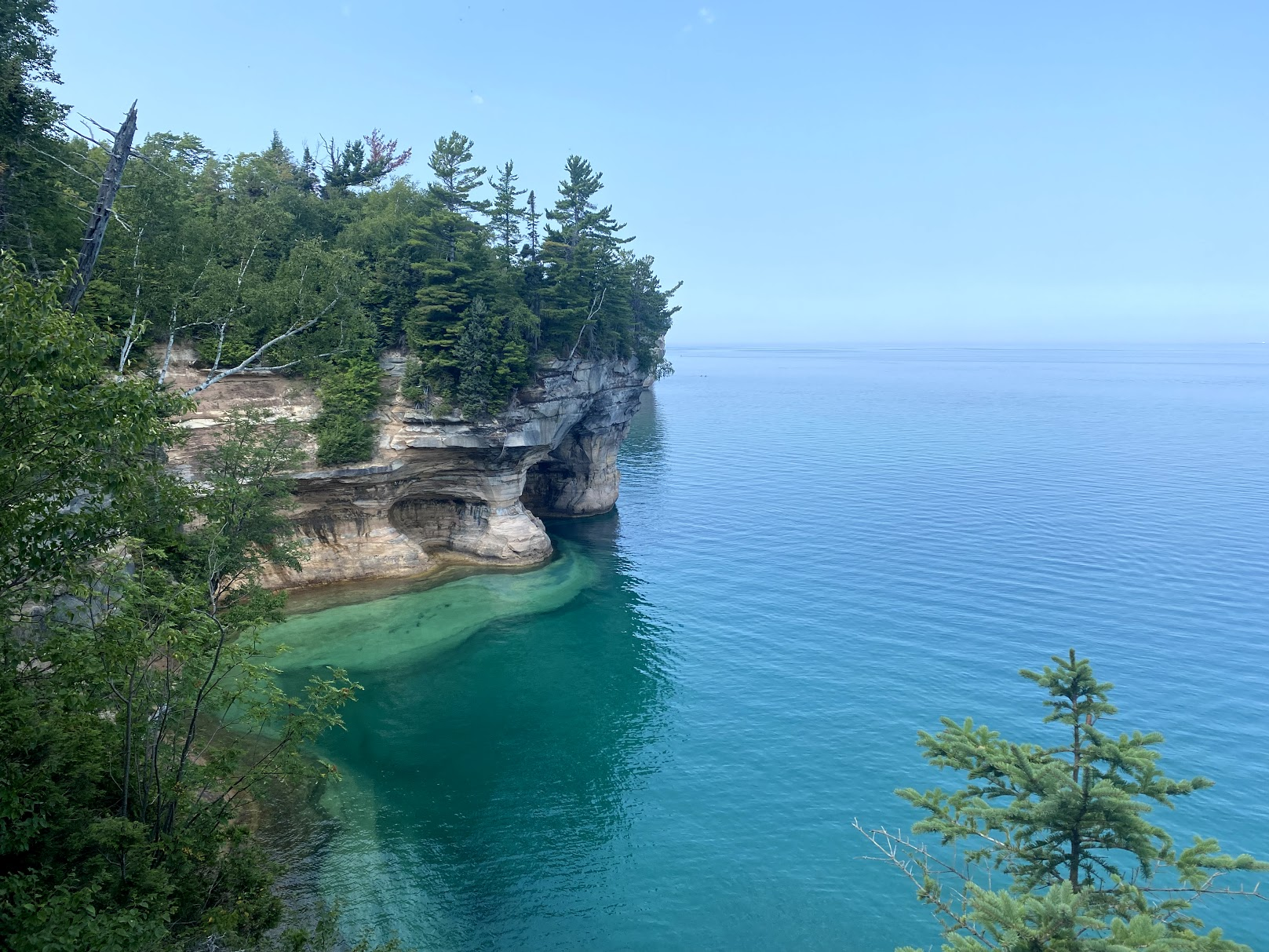
- Lake Superior from Pictured Rocks National Lakeshore

- Seal

- Location within the U.S. state of Michigan
- Coordinates: 47°10′N 86°29′W
- Country: United States
- State: Michigan
- Founded: March 17, 1885
- Named for: Russell A. Alger
- Seat: Munising
- Largest city: Munising

Area
  - Total: 5,048 sq mi (13,070 km^{2})
  - Land: 915 sq mi (2,370 km^{2})
  - Water: 4,133 sq mi (10,700 km^{2}) 82%

Population (2020)
  - Total: 8,842
  - Estimate (2025): 8,641 ▼
  - Density: 9.6/sq mi (3.7/km^{2})
- Time zone: UTC−5 (Eastern)
  - Summer (DST): UTC−4 (EDT)
- Congressional district: 1st
- Website: https://www.algercounty.gov/

Alger County (/ˌældʒər/ AL-jər) is a county in the Upper Peninsula of the U.S. state of Michigan. As of the 2020 Census, the population was 8,842. It is the state's second-largest county by area, including the waters of Lake Superior. The county seat is Munising. Alger County is home to Pictured Rocks National Lakeshore, which features rock formations, waterfalls, and sand dunes along the shore of Lake Superior. Much of the county is also part of the Hiawatha National Forest.

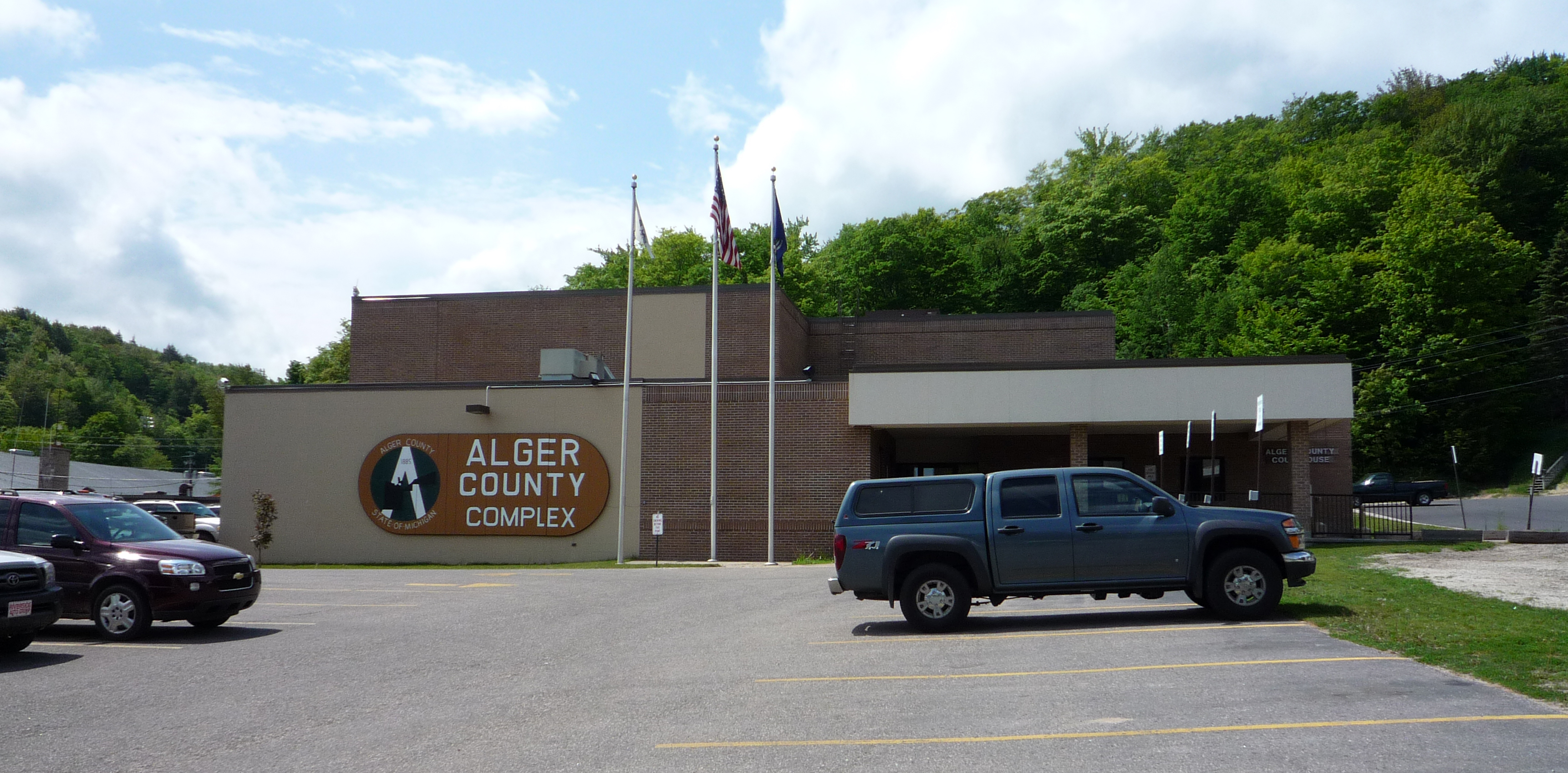
Alger County Courthouse Complex in Munising

== History ==
Alger County was detached from Schoolcraft County, set off and organized in 1885. The county was named for lumber baron Russell Alexander Alger, who was elected as a Michigan Governor, and US Senator, and appointed as US Secretary of War during the William McKinley Presidential administration. See also, List of Michigan county name etymologies, List of Michigan counties, and List of abolished U.S. counties.

== Geography ==
According to the U.S. Census Bureau, the county has a total area of 5,048 square miles (13,070 km^{2}), of which 915 square miles (2,370 km^{2}) is land and 4,133 square miles (10,700 km^{2}) (82%) is water. It is the second-largest county in Michigan by total area, mainly because of Lake Superior on the north side of the county.

=== Highways ===
- US 41
- M-28
- M-67
- M-77
- M-94
- H-01
- H-03
- H-05
- H-11
- H-13
- H-15
- H-44
- H-52
- H-58, passes through Pictured Rocks National Lakeshore.
- FFH 13

=== Adjacent counties ===
By land

- Luce County – east
- Schoolcraft County – southeast
- Delta County – south
- Marquette County – west

By water

- Thunder Bay District, Ontario – north

=== National protected areas ===
- Grand Island National Recreation Area
- Hiawatha National Forest (part)
- Pictured Rocks National Lakeshore

== Demographics ==
Historical population
Census	Pop.	Note	%±
1890	1,238		—
1900	5,868		374.0%
1910	7,675		30.8%
1920	9,983		30.1%
1930	9,327		−6.6%
1940	10,167		9.0%
1950	10,007		−1.6%
1960	9,250		−7.6%
1970	8,568		−7.4%
1980	9,225		7.7%
1990	8,972		−2.7%
2000	9,862		9.9%
2010	9,601		−2.6%
2020	8,842		−7.9%
2025 (est.)	8,641	▼	−2.3%
US Decennial Census; 1790-1960 1900-1990; 1990-2000 2010-2018

=== Racial and ethnic composition ===
Alger County, Michigan – Racial and ethnic composition Note: the US Census treats Hispanic/Latino as an ethnic category. This table excludes Latinos from the racial categories and assigns them to a separate category. Hispanics/Latinos may be of any race.
Race / Ethnicity (NH = Non-Hispanic)	Pop 1980	Pop 1990	Pop 2000	Pop 2010	Pop 2020	% 1980	% 1990	% 2000	% 2010	% 2020
White alone (NH)	8,927	8,392	8,625	8,213	7,323	96.77%	93.54%	87.46%	85.54%	82.82%
Black or African American alone (NH)	49	211	595	607	585	0.53%	2.35%	6.03%	6.32%	6.62%
Native American or Alaska Native alone (NH)	194	301	303	387	327	2.10%	3.35%	3.07%	4.03%	3.70%
Asian alone (NH)	14	24	32	31	22	0.15%	0.27%	0.32%	0.32%	0.25%
Native Hawaiian or Pacific Islander alone (NH)	x	x	3	0	1	x	x	0.03%	0.00%	0.01%
Other race alone (NH)	5	1	14	0	25	0.05%	0.01%	0.14%	0.00%	0.28%
Mixed race or Multiracial (NH)	x	x	191	249	444	x	x	1.94%	2.59%	5.02%
Hispanic or Latino (any race)	36	43	99	114	115	0.39%	0.48%	1.00%	1.19%	1.30%
Total	9,225	8,972	9,862	9,601	8,842	100.00%	100.00%	100.00%	100.00%	100.00%

=== 2020 census ===
As of the 2020 census, the county had a population of 8,842. The median age was 49.4 years. 15.8% of residents were under the age of 18 and 25.3% of residents were 65 years of age or older. For every 100 females there were 123.8 males, and for every 100 females age 18 and over there were 129.6 males age 18 and over.

The racial makeup of the county was 83.3% White, 6.6% Black or African American, 3.7% American Indian and Alaska Native, 0.3% Asian, <0.1% Native Hawaiian and Pacific Islander, 0.5% from some other race, and 5.6% from two or more races. Hispanic or Latino residents of any race comprised 1.3% of the population.

<0.1% of residents lived in urban areas, while 100.0% lived in rural areas.

There were 3,609 households in the county, of which 20.6% had children under the age of 18 living in them. Of all households, 51.4% were married-couple households, 21.1% were households with a male householder and no spouse or partner present, and 20.6% were households with a female householder and no spouse or partner present. About 31.1% of all households were made up of individuals and 15.4% had someone living alone who was 65 years of age or older.

There were 6,169 housing units, of which 41.5% were vacant. Among occupied housing units, 83.7% were owner-occupied and 16.3% were renter-occupied. The homeowner vacancy rate was 2.3% and the rental vacancy rate was 18.8%.

=== 2010 census ===
As of the 2010 census, Alger County had a population of 9,601. The racial makeup of the county was 86.3% White, 6.4% Black or African American, 4.1% Native American, 0.3% Asian, 0.1% of some other race and 2.7% of two or more races; of them 1.2% were Hispanic or Latino (of any race). Regarding specific ethnicities, 15.7% of the population was of German heritage, 13.5% Finnish, 12.6% French, French Canadian or Cajun, 9.3% English, 7.3% Polish, 6.9% Irish and 5.3% American ancestry.

In 2010, there were 3,898 households, out of which 20.1% had children under the age of 18 living with them, 52.2% were married couples living together, 7.1% had a female householder with no husband present, and 36.4% were non-families. 31.6% of all households were made up of individuals, and 15.2% had someone living alone who was 65 years of age or older. The average household size was 2.2 and the average family size was 2.74. In the county, the population was spread out, with 17.1% under the age of 18, 6.6% from 18 to 24, 22.8% from 25 to 44, 32.8% from 45 to 64, and 20.7% who were 65 years of age or older. The median age was 47.3 years. The population was 54.4% male and 45.6% female.

In 2010, the median income for a household in the county was $38,231, and the median income for a family was $46,154. The per capita income for the county was $19,858. About 9.3% of people in families and 14.0% of the population were below the poverty line, including 19.3% of those under age 18 and 8.2% of those age 65 or over. The 2021 census estimates showed the county had a median household income of $48,822.

== Government ==
The county government operates the jail, maintains rural roads, operates local courts, records deeds, mortgages, and vital records, administers public health regulations, and participates with the state in the provision of welfare and other social services. The county board of commissioners controls the budget and has limited authority to make laws or ordinances. In Michigan, most local government functions — police and fire, building and zoning, tax assessment, street maintenance, etc. — are the responsibility of individual cities and townships.

== Politics ==
Alger County was reliably Republican from the beginning through 1928. Since then it has voted for the Democratic nominee 67% (16 of 24) of the time, though it has voted Republican in the last four elections.

United States presidential election results for Alger County, Michigan
Year	Republican		Democratic		Third party(ies)	
Year	No.	%	No.	%	No.	%
1888	284	62.28%	162	35.53%	10	2.19%
1892	160	50.31%	156	49.06%	2	0.63%
1896	801	58.42%	539	39.31%	31	2.26%
1900	1,017	69.90%	415	28.52%	23	1.58%
1904	1,081	81.40%	204	15.36%	43	3.24%
1908	997	75.59%	231	17.51%	91	6.90%
1912	290	26.56%	263	24.08%	539	49.36%
1916	687	48.31%	650	45.71%	85	5.98%
1920	1,263	66.09%	468	24.49%	180	9.42%
1924	1,623	66.52%	228	9.34%	589	24.14%
1928	1,716	59.05%	1,053	36.24%	137	4.71%
1932	1,354	36.69%	2,111	57.21%	225	6.10%
1936	1,291	30.67%	2,824	67.09%	94	2.23%
1940	1,629	34.84%	2,984	63.83%	62	1.33%
1944	1,504	37.26%	2,519	62.41%	13	0.32%
1948	1,702	42.73%	2,009	50.44%	272	6.83%
1952	2,066	49.68%	2,058	49.48%	35	0.84%
1956	2,070	49.37%	2,105	50.20%	18	0.43%
1960	1,663	41.68%	2,321	58.17%	6	0.15%
1964	1,010	26.90%	2,743	73.05%	2	0.05%
1968	1,406	40.03%	1,927	54.87%	179	5.10%
1972	2,035	52.48%	1,803	46.49%	40	1.03%
1976	1,722	41.38%	2,379	57.17%	60	1.44%
1980	2,059	44.31%	2,242	48.25%	346	7.45%
1984	2,175	51.69%	2,018	47.96%	15	0.36%
1988	1,830	45.08%	2,210	54.45%	19	0.47%
1992	1,471	32.19%	2,144	46.91%	955	20.90%
1996	1,429	33.77%	2,229	52.68%	573	13.54%
2000	2,142	49.06%	2,071	47.43%	153	3.50%
2004	2,318	48.65%	2,395	50.26%	52	1.09%
2008	2,188	46.06%	2,472	52.04%	90	1.89%
2012	2,330	50.45%	2,212	47.90%	76	1.65%
2016	2,585	57.22%	1,663	36.81%	270	5.98%
2020	3,014	58.70%	2,053	39.98%	68	1.32%
2024	3,116	59.26%	2,075	39.46%	67	1.27%

United States Senate election results for Alger County, Michigan1
Year	Republican		Democratic		Third party(ies)	
Year	No.	%	No.	%	No.	%
2024	3,002	58.48%	2,047	39.88%	84	1.64%

Michigan Gubernatorial election results for Alger County
Year	Republican		Democratic		Third party(ies)	
Year	No.	%	No.	%	No.	%
2022	2,258	52.20%	1,984	45.86%	84	1.94%

== Communities ==
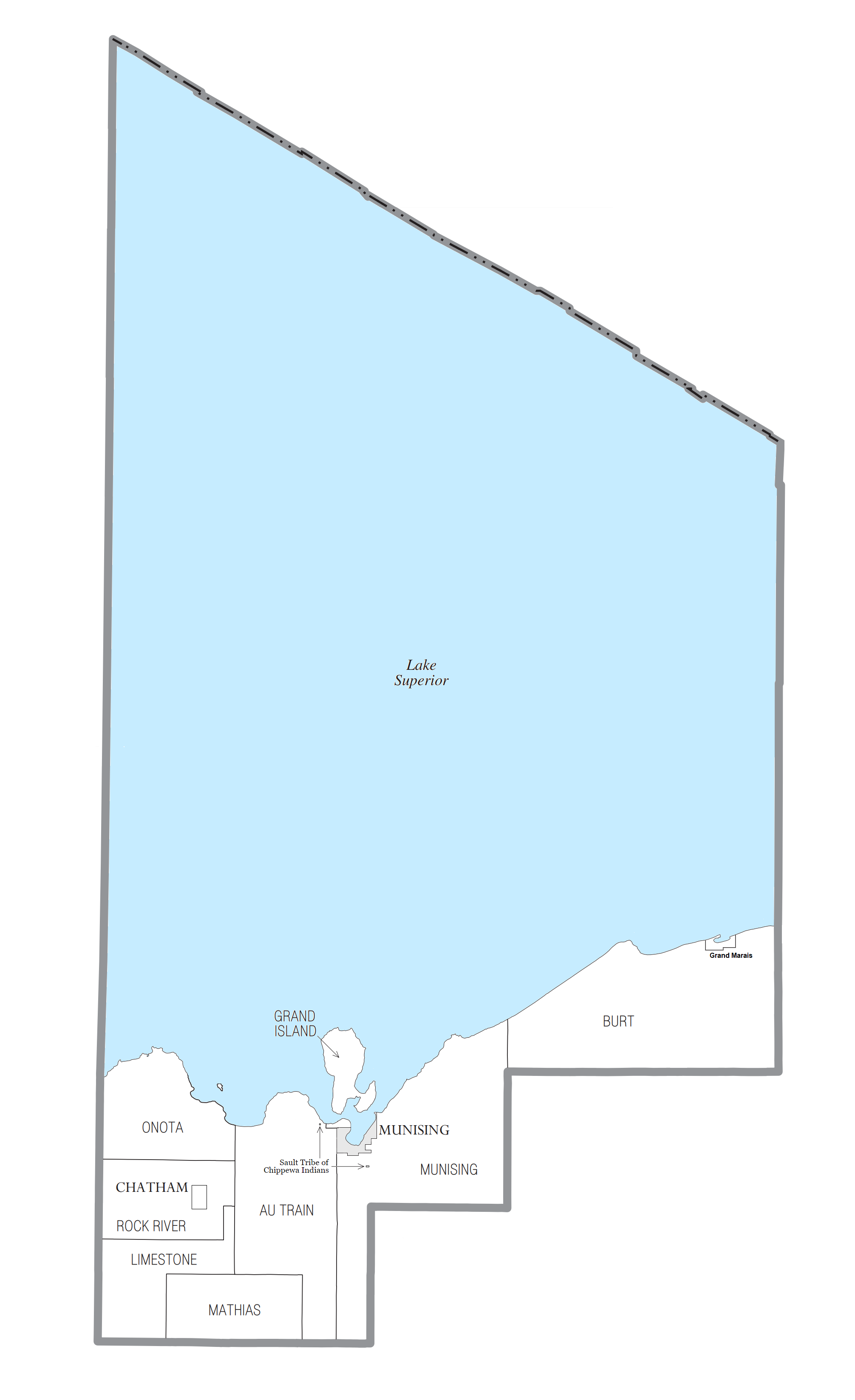
U.S. Census data map showing local municipal boundaries within Alger County, as well as the CDP of Grand Marais. Shaded areas represent incorporated cities.

=== City ===
- Munising (county seat)

=== Village ===
- Chatham

=== Civil townships ===
- Au Train Township
- Burt Township
- Grand Island Township
- Limestone Township
- Mathias Township
- Munising Township
- Onota Township
- Rock River Township

=== Census-designated place ===
- Grand Marais

=== Unincorporated communities ===
- Au Train
- Christmas
- Coalwood
- Deerton
- Diffin
- Dixon
- Dorsey
- Doty
- Eben Junction
- Evelyn
- Forest Lake
- Green Haven
- Indian Town
- Juniper
- Kentucky
- Kiva
- Ladoga
- Limestone
- Mantila Camp
- Melstrand
- Munising Junction
- Myren
- Onota
- Rock River
- Rumely
- Sand River
- Shingleton
- Slapneck
- Star
- Stillman
- Sullivans Landing
- Sundell
- Sunrise Landing
- Traunik
- Trenary
- Vail
- Van Meer
- Wetmore
- Williams Crossing
- Williams Landing
- Winters

=== Other locations ===
- Bay Furnace (1869–1940)

=== Indian reservations ===
- Alger County contains two very small portions of the Sault Tribe of Chippewa Indians tribal community, which is headquartered in Sault Ste. Marie in Chippewa County. One portion is in the northeastern corner of Au Train Township, and another slightly larger portion is about two miles south of Munising in Munising Township.

== See also ==
- List of Michigan State Historic Sites in Alger County
- National Register of Historic Places listings in Alger County, Michigan
