= Mathias Township, Michigan =

- Civil township
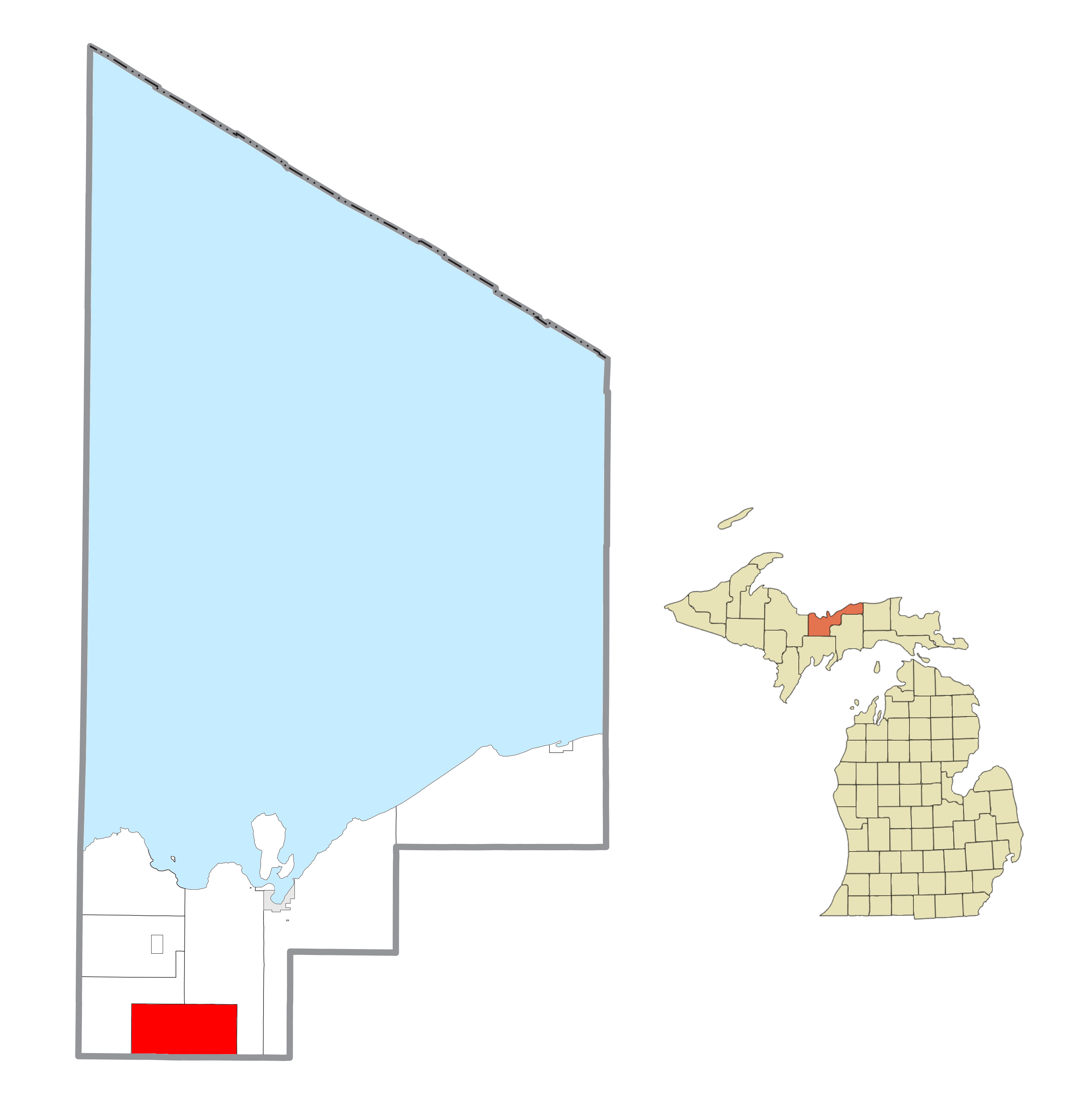
- Location within Alger County

- Location within the state of Michigan Location within the United States
- Coordinates: 46°11′09″N 86°51′39″W
- Country: United States
- State: Michigan
- County: Alger

Government
  - Supervisor: Roy Aho
  - Clerk: Amy Richmond

Area
  - Total: 72.0 sq mi (186.5 km^{2})
  - Land: 70.7 sq mi (183.1 km^{2})
  - Water: 1.4 sq mi (3.5 km^{2})
- Elevation: 790 ft (240 m)

Population (2020)
  - Total: 532
  - Density: 7.84/sq mi (3.03/km^{2})
- Time zone: UTC-5 (Eastern (EST))
  - Summer (DST): UTC-4 (EDT)
- ZIP code(s): 49816 (Chatham); 49862 (Munising); 49878 (Rapid River); 49891 (Trenary); 49895 (Wetmore)
- Area code: 906
- FIPS code: 26-52360
- GNIS feature ID: 1626710
- Website: Official website

Mathias Township is a civil township of Alger County in the U.S. state of Michigan. The population was 554 at the 2010 census. In 2020, its population was 532.

== Geography ==
According to the United States Census Bureau, the township has a total area of 72.0 square miles (186.5 km^{2}), of which 70.7 square miles (183.1 km^{2}) is land and 1.4 square miles (3.5 km^{2}), or 1.87%, is water.

=== Communities ===
- Trenary is an unincorporated community at 46°11′43″N 86°58′11″W. The town's name is familiar to many in the Upper Midwest, especially in the Upper Peninsula of Michigan. A food product from Trenary is "Trenary Toast", a style of Finnish rusk bread, based on the original korppu. Average rainfall is 35 inches (89 cm) per year, and average snowfall is 129 inches (330 cm) per year within the township.

== Demographics ==
Historical population
Census	Pop.	Note	%±
1960	742		—
1970	644		−13.2%
1980	680		5.6%
1990	563		−17.2%
2000	571		1.4%
2010	554		−3.0%
Source: Census Bureau. Census 1960- 2000, 2010.

As of the census of 2000, there were 571 people, 262 households, and 166 families residing in the township. The population density was 8.0 inhabitants per square mile (3.1/km^{2}). There were 465 housing units at an average density of 6.5 units per square mile (2.5 units/km^{2}). The racial makeup of the township was 96.32% White, 1.23% Native American, 0.53% Asian, 0.53% from other races, and 1.40% from two or more races. Hispanic or Latinos of any race were 1.40% of the population. Culturally, 30.5% were of Finnish, 13.9% German, 7.3% United States or American, 6.8% English, 6.6% Swedish and 5.6% Irish ancestry. In 2020, its population declined to 532.

In 2000, there were 262 households, out of which 21.4% had children under the age of 18 living with them, 46.6% were married couples living together, 11.5% had a female householder with no husband present, and 36.6% were non-families. 31.7% of all households were made up of individuals, and 14.5% had someone living alone who was 65 years of age or older. The average household size was 2.18 and the average family size was 2.70.

In the township the population was spread out, with 19.4% under the age of 18, 6.1% from 18 to 24, 25.0% from 25 to 44, 27.5% from 45 to 64, and 21.9% who were 65 years of age or older. The median age was 45 years. For every 100 females, there were 108.4 males. For every 100 females age 18 and over, there were 105.4 males.

In 2000, the median income for a household in the township was $25,167, and the median income for a family was $27,500. Males had a median income of $35,000 versus $22,250 for females. The per capita income for the township was $16,135. About 15.4% of families and 20.4% of the population were below the poverty line, including 37.6% of those under age 18 and 5.5% of those age 65 or over. As of 2021, its median household income was $53,125.

== Outhouse Classic ==
Since 1993, Trenary has played host to the Trenary Outhouse Classic. This event is held on the last Saturday of February. The event brings in around 4000 spectators. Outhouse race participants build outhouses of their own design mounted on skis. The outhouse must have a toilet seat, roll of toilet paper, and skis. Participants push the outhouse 500 feet (150 m) and across the finish line. The race takes place on Trenary's Main Street. There are several categories to win in, including kids age 6–10, kids 16–20, adults 21–35, adults 36-49 and adults 50 and over.
