= Chatham, Michigan =

- Village
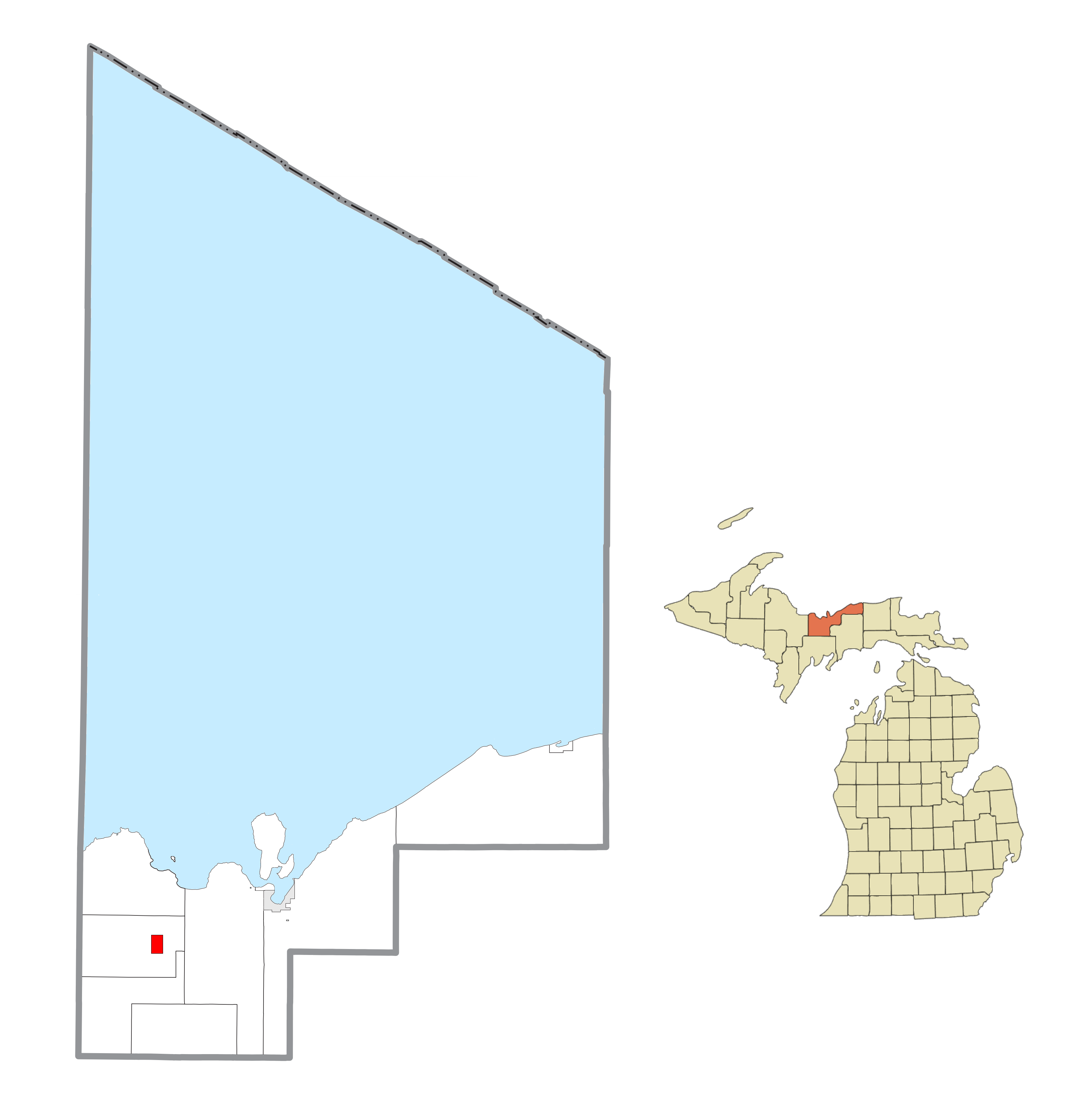
- Location within Alger County, Michigan

- Location within the state of Michigan Location within the United States
- Coordinates: 46°20′39″N 86°55′53″W
- Country: United States
- State: Michigan
- County: Alger County, Michigan.svg Alger
- Township: Rock River
- Settled: 1896

Area
  - Total: 2.46 sq mi (6.36 km^{2})
  - Land: 2.46 sq mi (6.36 km^{2})
  - Water: 0 sq mi (0.00 km^{2})
- Elevation: 889 ft (271 m)

Population (2020)
  - Total: 193
  - Density: 78.7/sq mi (30.37/km^{2})
- Time zone: UTC-5 (Eastern (EST))
  - Summer (DST): UTC-4 (EDT)
- ZIP code(s): 49816
- Area code: 906
- FIPS code: 26-14940
- GNIS feature ID: 2397607

Chatham (/ˈtʃætəm/ CHAT-əm) is a village in Alger County in the U.S. state of Michigan. It is located within Rock River Township. The population was 193 at the 2020 census.

The village is located along M-94 about 15 miles (24 km) southwest of the city of Munising. It was named after Chatham, Ontario, Canada, the town where the lumber company Sutherland Innis was headquartered.

== History ==
The first settler came to Chatham in 1896, when the Munising Railway Company (later Lake Superior and Ishpeming) established a line through the town. The railroad company, along with the lumber company Sutherland Innis, platted a village where the railroad intersected the township road.

Logging was the major economic activity in the area throughout the late 19th and early 20th centuries, with Sutherland Innis, Cleveland-Cliffs Iron Company, Northwestern Cooperage and Lumber Company (Buckeye Company) and T.G. Sullivan having camps scattered throughout the area.

== Geography ==
According to the United States Census Bureau, the village has a total area of 2.45 square miles (6.35 km^{2}), all land.

=== Climate ===
This climatic region is typified by large seasonal temperature differences, with warm to hot (and often humid) summers and cold (sometimes severely cold) winters. According to the Köppen Climate Classification system, Chatham has a humid continental climate, abbreviated "Dfb" on climate maps.

Climate data for Chatham 1 SE, Michigan, 1991–2020 normals: 875 ft (267 m)
Month	Jan	Feb	Mar	Apr	May	Jun	Jul	Aug	Sep	Oct	Nov	Dec	Year
Record high °F (°C)	48 (9)	58 (14)	81 (27)	79 (26)	89 (32)	90 (32)	94 (34)	94 (34)	90 (32)	82 (28)	76 (24)	54 (12)	94 (34)
Mean maximum °F (°C)	39.5 (4.2)	42.3 (5.7)	54.1 (12.3)	69.5 (20.8)	81.4 (27.4)	85.8 (29.9)	88.6 (31.4)	87.4 (30.8)	83.1 (28.4)	73.3 (22.9)	57.9 (14.4)	43.4 (6.3)	87.6 (30.9)
Mean daily maximum °F (°C)	23.6 (−4.7)	26.2 (−3.2)	34.9 (1.6)	46.6 (8.1)	61.4 (16.3)	70.5 (21.4)	75.5 (24.2)	74.5 (23.6)	67.0 (19.4)	53.2 (11.8)	39.8 (4.3)	29.0 (−1.7)	50.2 (10.1)
Daily mean °F (°C)	16.2 (−8.8)	16.8 (−8.4)	25.5 (−3.6)	36.9 (2.7)	49.7 (9.8)	59.0 (15.0)	63.9 (17.7)	63.2 (17.3)	56.3 (13.5)	44.2 (6.8)	32.6 (0.3)	22.5 (−5.3)	40.6 (4.7)
Mean daily minimum °F (°C)	8.7 (−12.9)	7.4 (−13.7)	16.1 (−8.8)	27.3 (−2.6)	38.1 (3.4)	47.5 (8.6)	52.4 (11.3)	52.0 (11.1)	45.6 (7.6)	35.1 (1.7)	25.3 (−3.7)	16.0 (−8.9)	31.0 (−0.6)
Mean minimum °F (°C)	−12.8 (−24.9)	−18.7 (−28.2)	−10.1 (−23.4)	10.6 (−11.9)	23.9 (−4.5)	33.7 (0.9)	40.4 (4.7)	38.2 (3.4)	32.0 (0.0)	22.1 (−5.5)	6.5 (−14.2)	−6.6 (−21.4)	−20.5 (−29.2)
Record low °F (°C)	−25 (−32)	−32 (−36)	−23 (−31)	−4 (−20)	20 (−7)	30 (−1)	35 (2)	34 (1)	27 (−3)	14 (−10)	−12 (−24)	−26 (−32)	−32 (−36)
Average precipitation inches (mm)	2.54 (65)	1.91 (49)	2.07 (53)	2.79 (71)	3.39 (86)	3.52 (89)	3.33 (85)	2.89 (73)	4.04 (103)	4.42 (112)	3.37 (86)	2.70 (69)	36.97 (941)
Average snowfall inches (cm)	45.60 (115.8)	29.70 (75.4)	18.60 (47.2)	11.80 (30.0)	0.60 (1.5)	0.00 (0.00)	0.00 (0.00)	0.00 (0.00)	0.00 (0.00)	2.50 (6.4)	18.90 (48.0)	36.30 (92.2)	164 (416.5)
Source 1: NOAA(Chatham Exp Farm 2 Snowfall)
Source 2: XMACIS (records & monthly max/mins)

== Demographics ==
Historical population
Census	Pop.	Note	%±
1970	246		—
1980	315		28.0%
1990	268		−14.9%
2000	231		−13.8%
2010	220		−4.8%
2020	193		−12.3%
U.S. Decennial Census

=== 2010 census ===
As of the census of 2010, there were 220 people, 97 households, and 61 families residing in the village. The population density was 89.8 inhabitants per square mile (34.7/km^{2}). There were 120 housing units at an average density of 49.0 units per square mile (18.9 units/km^{2}). The racial makeup of the village was 88.6% White, 0.9% African American, 7.3% Native American, and 3.2% from two or more races.

There were 97 households, of which 30.9% had children under the age of 18 living with them, 45.4% were married couples living together, 12.4% had a female householder with no husband present, 5.2% had a male householder with no wife present, and 37.1% were non-families. 33.0% of all households were made up of individuals, and 18.6% had someone living alone who was 65 years of age or older. The average household size was 2.27 and the average family size was 2.85.

The median age in the village was 44.3 years. 26.4% of residents were under the age of 18; 5.9% were between the ages of 18 and 24; 19.1% were from 25 to 44; 32.7% were from 45 to 64; and 15.9% were 65 years of age or older. The gender makeup of the village was 49.5% male and 50.5% female.

=== 2000 census ===
As of the census of 2000, there were 231 people, 98 households, and 64 families residing in the village. The population density was 87.6 inhabitants per square mile (33.8/km^{2}). There were 116 housing units at an average density of 44.0 units per square mile (17.0 units/km^{2}). The racial makeup of the village was 94.37% White, 4.76% Native American, and 0.87% from two or more races. 58.5% were of Finnish, 12.5% German, 6.0% French and 5.5% English ancestry according to Census 2000. 92.3% spoke English and 7.7% Finnish as their first language.

There were 98 households, out of which 31.6% had children under the age of 18 living with them, 56.1% were married couples living together, 8.2% had a female householder with no husband present, and 33.7% were non-families. 29.6% of all households were made up of individuals, and 13.3% had someone living alone who was 65 years of age or older. The average household size was 2.36 and the average family size was 2.92.

In the village, the population was spread out, with 24.2% under the age of 18, 9.5% from 18 to 24, 22.5% from 25 to 44, 29.0% from 45 to 64, and 14.7% who were 65 years of age or older. The median age was 41 years. For every 100 females, there were 87.8 males. For every 100 females age 18 and over, there were 88.2 males.

The median income for a household in the village was $31,406, and the median income for a family was $37,188. Males had a median income of $28,125 versus $19,375 for females. The per capita income for the village was $14,266. About 4.9% of families and 8.4% of the population were below the poverty line, including 4.7% of those under the age of eighteen and 20.0% of those 65 or over.
