= M178 =

M178 may refer to

- M-178 (Michigan highway), a former state highway
- Mercedes-Benz M178 engine, an automobile engine
- M178 gun mount, a mount used on the M109 howitzer
