= County Road 492 (Marquette County, Michigan) =

County road in Michigan, United States

County Road 492
- CR 492 highlighted in red

Route information
- Maintained by MCRC
- Length: 13.008 mi (20.934 km)
- Existed: 1936–present

Major junctions
- West end: US 41 / M-28 in Negaunee
- M-35 in Negaunee Township; US 41 / M-28 in Marquette Township
- East end: Lakeshore Boulevard in Marquette

Location
- Country: United States
- State: Michigan
- County: Marquette

Highway system
- Marquette County Roads

County Road 492 (CR 492, Co. Rd. 492) is a primary county road in Marquette County, Michigan. The road serves as an alternate route between Negaunee and Marquette. Several historic sites line the roadway as it runs south and parallel to the main highway, U.S. Highway 41 (US 41) and M-28, through the Marquette Iron Range in Michigan's Upper Peninsula. The path of the road runs near tracks of the Lake Superior and Ishpeming Railroad (LS&I). The locally created Iron Ore Heritage Trail will follow CR 492 through Eagle Mills and Morgan Meadows upon completion. The western terminus of the county road is on US 41/M-28 in Negaunee and the eastern end is in Marquette next to Lake Superior.

CR 492 was previously known as the Marquette–Negaunee Road before it was made a part of the State Trunkline Highway System. It was originally designated as a part of M-15 as early as 1917. The superintendent of the Marquette County Road Commission, Kenneth Ingalls Sawyer, painted the first rural highway centerline on the roadway on Dead Man's Curve. The highway was later a part of M-28 before being transferred back to county control. The highway assumed its current form by 2001. The eastern section along Brookton Road in Marquette Township was redesignated as a county secondary highway when a new connection to US 41/M-28 was opened, and the designation was extended along Wright Street on the west and north sides of Marquette.

== Route description ==
In the city of Negaunee, CR 492 is a part of Maas Street, which runs east–west through town starting at Teal Lake. CR 492 begins at the intersection of Maas Street and US 41/M-28 in Negaunee next to Miners Park. From there, CR 492 passes some businesses near the highway before running through a residential area. East of Woodland Drive, the street runs downhill into a more rural section of town. In this area, the roadway runs through forested terrain parallel to tracks of the LS&I. The road then loops to the north away from the tracks, crossing the Carp River next to the Forge Road intersection. Through this area, the Iron Ore Heritage Trail, a multi-use trail system, was built to follow CR 492, and opened in 2013. Forge Road runs north to the Michigan Iron Industry Museum on the site of the Carp River Forge, the original iron ore forge in the region. Maas Street runs along the south side of the city cemetery. The cemetery main gate is located near the city limits, where Maas Street ends and CR 492 continues into Negaunee Township.

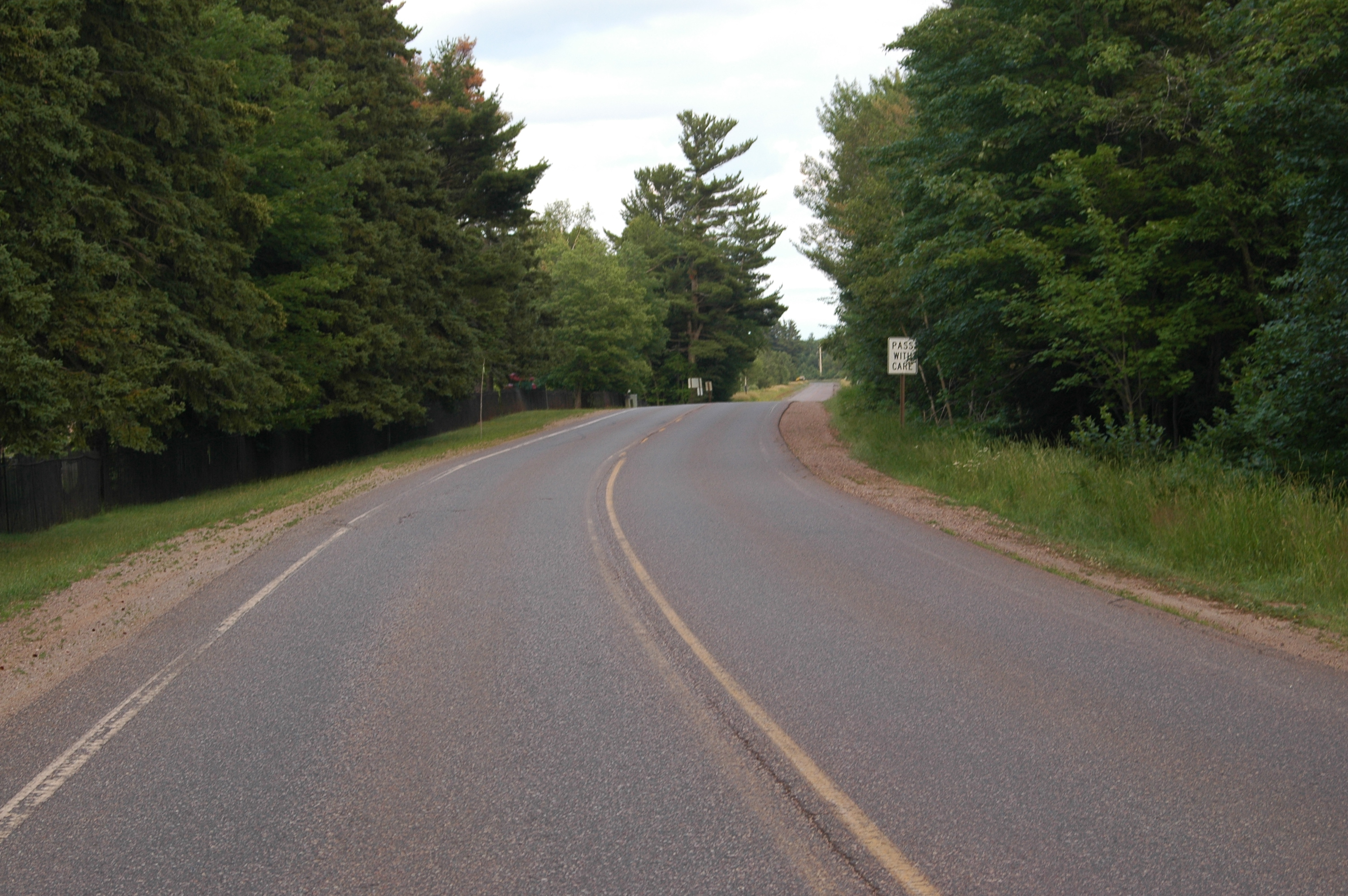
By the Negaunee City Cemetery gates

CR 492 intersects M-35 near Eagle Mills Location with a roundabout constructed in 2026.Eagle Mills is the location of the main LS&I rail yard and the former Pioneer Pellet Plant, the first such iron ore pelletizing plant in the country. CR 492 curves away from this industrial area to the northeast. The roadway crosses Morgan Creek and enters the Morgan Heights area on the border of Negaunee Township and Marquette Township. This is the site of the first tuberculosis sanatorium in the Upper Peninsula built in 1911; the facility is said to have been haunted before the main buildings were torn down around 2002. The road continues east through forested lands in Marquette Township, rounding Dead Man's Curve and running downhill into the Morgan Meadows area. CR 492 passes a convent of the Sisters of St. Paul de Chartres before entering a residential area. The road curves north past these subdivisions, meeting the western end of CR 500 (Grove Street). Further north, CR 492 intersects Brookton Road before the western segment terminates at US 41/M-28 in the middle of Marquette Township's commercial corridor.

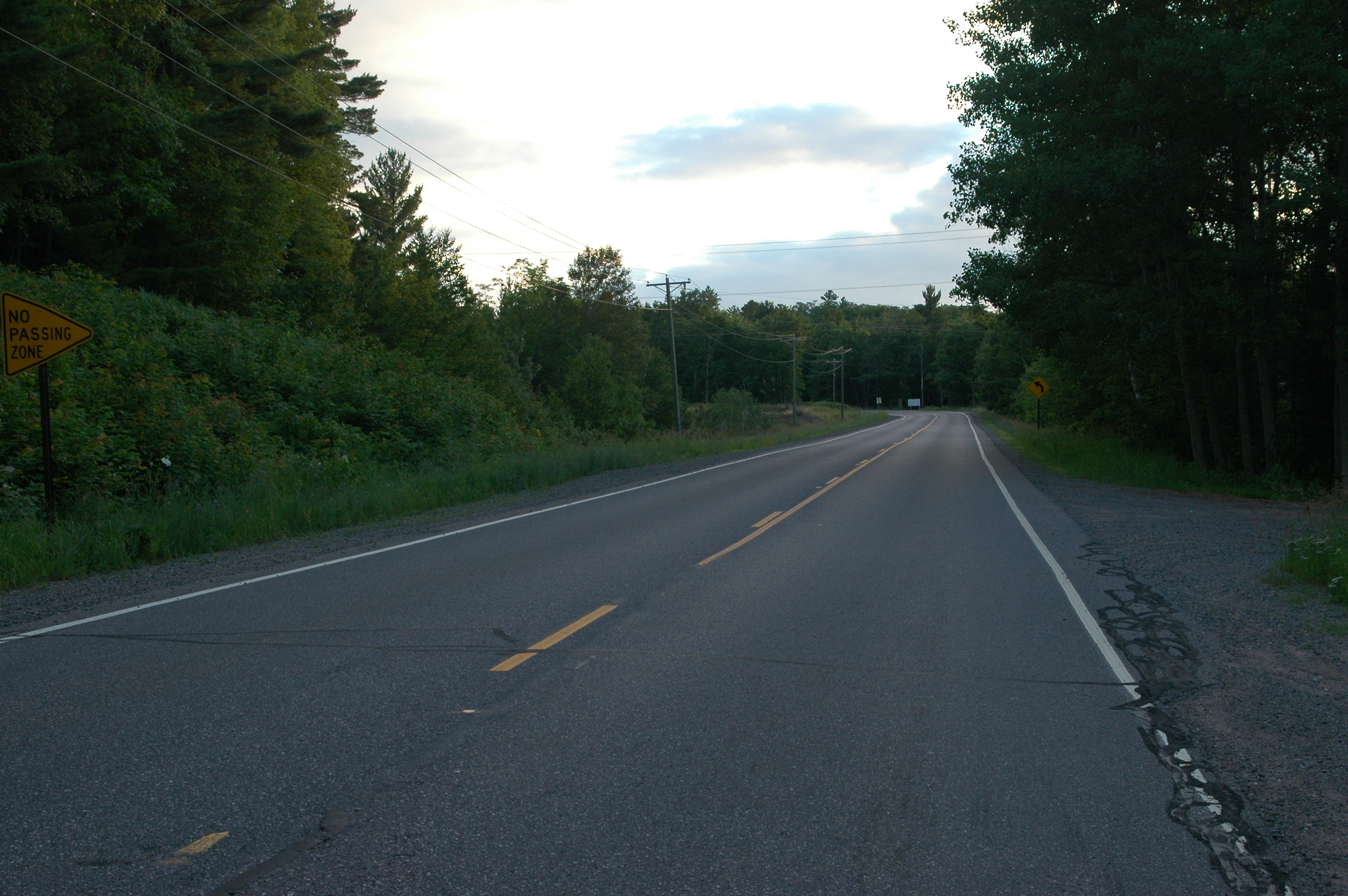
Dead Man's Curve, 2013

The county road designation resumes to the west at a roundabout on US 41/M-28 about 1,300 feet (400 m) from the previous intersection. From this location, CR 492 runs northward between several businesses. North of this commercial development, the roadway curves to the northeast to round the northern side of the North Star Academy and merge onto Wright Street. The roadway leaves the commercial corridor and returns to woodland before the intersection with Forestville Road and Commerce Drive. Wright Street curves to the northeast and then the east crossing into the westernmost section of the City of Marquette. As Wright Street continues eastward, it runs through a residential section along part of the city line before completely crossing into Marquette. The roadway passes the Holy Cross Cemetery and the north side of the campus of Northern Michigan University (NMU). The northern main entrance to campus is located at the intersection with CR 550 (Sugar Loaf Avenue) and Tracy Avenue. Wright Street passes through residential neighborhoods east of CR 550 before meeting Presque Isle Avenue. East of that intersection, CR 492 crosses onto the northern edge of NMU's campus immediately north of the Superior Dome. Wright Street ends as it curves around to the south into a junction with Lakeshore Boulevard at the shore of Lake Superior.

== History ==
The first roadway along the route of the modern CR 492 was a plank road built by the Cleveland and Sharon Iron Companies in the 1850s. The roadway was originally named the Marquette–Negaunee Road, due to its endpoints. The road was included as a section of "Division 8" in the State Trunkline Highway System when that was created on May 13, 1913. In 1917, the first highway centerline in the nation was painted along a section of the road known as "Dead Man's Curve". The centerline was painted by Kenneth Ingalls Sawyer, long-time superintendent of the county road commission. Traffic along the road was heavy for the era, and along the curves, drivers would follow the innermost side instead of keeping to their own lane. Sawyer added arrows to indicate travel direction and found that motorists used the appropriate travel lanes.

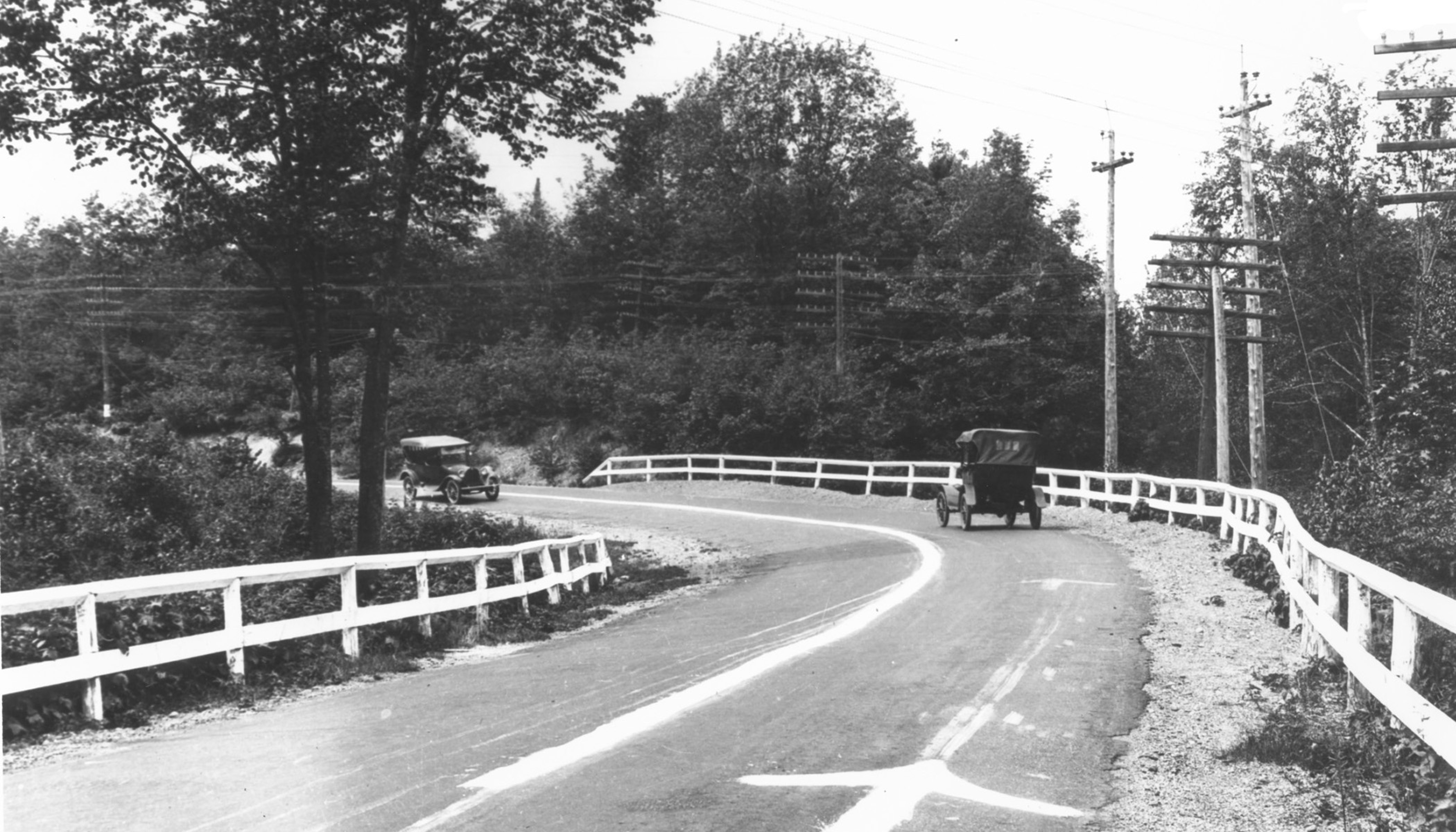
Dead Man's Curve along the Marquette–Negaunee Road shown in 1917 with its hand-painted centerline, the first in the nation

At this time, the road carried an unsigned designation of "Trunk Line 15" (T.L. 15) as designated by the Michigan State Highway Department (MSHD). This designation was changed to M-15 by the time the state highway system was signed by MSHD in 1919. With the creation of the United States Highway System on November 11, 1926, M-15 in Michigan was redesignated as a part of the larger US 41. Between Negaunee and Marquette, US 41 was routed north of the Marquette–Negaunee Road, following a section of M-35 out of downtown Negaunee. At the same time, M-28 was extended eastward through the Upper Peninsula of Michigan. Between Negaunee and Marquette, M-28 followed the old routing of M-15. By 1936, M-28 was shifted to follow US 41 between Negaunee and Marquette, transferring the old Marquette–Negaunee Road to county control.

After this transfer, the roadway carried the CR 492 designation. In 1964, several abandoned underground mine shafts collapsed underneath M-35 in Negaunee, and M-35 was rerouted out of the city along its current roadway through Negaunee Township, connecting with CR 492. The eastern end of CR 492 was moved by 2001. Before this realignment, CR 492 followed Brookton Road, parallel to US 41/M-28 before turning to the previous terminus just west of the border between Marquette Township and the City of Marquette. After the change, CR 492 turned north to intersect the highway opposite of Wright Street. The CR 492 designation was extended along Wright Street at the same time. In 2006, the city of Marquette extended Wright Street to end at Lakeshore Boulevard.

In 2010, the county road commission built an extension to Commerce Drive across US 41/M-28. This extension was designed to connect the southern and northern segments of CR 492 severed by traffic flow changes along US 41/M-28. Traffic wishing to cross between the two segments needs to follow US 41/M-28 to a median turn around in a maneuver similar to a Michigan left. After the project was completed, motorists gained a second option to cross between the two segments of CR 492 following Brookton Road to the Commerce Drive extension and around the Westwood Mall to Wright Street. This newer connector is designed for 35-mile-per-hour (56 km/h) traffic. The stop light at the US 41/M-28 intersection was installed in early November to complete the project. In August 2010, the speed limits along Wright Street were increased. After the results of a speed study, the limits were increased from 25 and 35 mph (40 and 56 km/h) to 35, 40 and 45 mph (56, 64 and 72 km/h).

In 2019, two intersections controlled by stoplights along US 41/M-28 in Marquette Township were rebuilt as roundabouts. The easternmost of the two is located at the southwestern end of the northeastern segment of CR 492.

== Major intersections ==
The entire road is in Marquette County.

Location	mi	km	Destinations	Notes
Negaunee	0.000	0.000	US 41 / M-28 / LSCT	Western end of western segment; street continues west as Maas Street
Negaunee	2.019	3.249	Forge Road (Co. Rd. JQ)	Access to Michigan Iron Industry Museum
Negaunee Township	3.405– 3.460	5.480– 5.568	M-35	Short concurrency so that M-35 can cross rail line
Marquette Township	7.802	12.556	CR 500 (Grove Street)	
Marquette Township	8.787	14.141	Brookton Road (Co. Rd. HF)	Formerly CR 492
Marquette Township	8.912	14.342	US 41 / M-28 / LSCT	Eastern end of eastern segment
Marquette Township	Gap in route			
Marquette Township	8.912	14.342	US 41 / M-28 / LSCT	Southwestern end of northeastern segment
Marquette Township	9.495	15.281	Wright Street	Formerly CR 492
Marquette Township	9.546	15.363	Forestville Road north (Co. Rd. HQ) CR 505 east (Commerce Drive)	
Marquette	10.717	17.247	CR 498 south (Ontario Street)	
Marquette	12.217	19.661	CR 550 north (Sugar Loaf Avenue to Big Bay Road)	
Marquette	13.008	20.934	Lakeshore Boulevard	Eastern end of the northeastern segment
1.000 mi = 1.609 km; 1.000 km = 0.621 mi: Concurrency terminus
