= M-28 (Michigan highway) =

State highway in Michigan, United States

M-28
- M-28 highlighted in red

Route information
- Maintained by MDOT
- Length: 290.373 mi (467.310 km)
- Existed: c. July 1, 1919–present
- Tourist routes: Lake Superior Circle Tour

Major junctions
- West end: US 2 at Wakefield
- US 45 at Bruce Crossing; US 141 near Covington; US 41 in Covington; M-35 near Negaunee; US 41 in Harvey; I-75 near Dafter
- East end: M-129 near Sault Ste. Marie

Location
- Country: United States
- State: Michigan
- Counties: Gogebic, Ontonagon, Houghton, Baraga, Marquette, Alger, Schoolcraft, Luce, Chippewa

Highway system
- Michigan State Trunkline Highway System; Interstate; US; State; Byways
← M-27	→ Bus. M-28
← M-177	M-178	→ M-179

M-28 is an east–west state trunkline highway that traverses nearly all of the Upper Peninsula of the U.S. state of Michigan, from Wakefield to near Sault Ste. Marie in Bruce Township. Along with US Highway 2 (US 2), M-28 forms a pair of primary highways linking the Upper Peninsula from end to end, providing a major access route for traffic from Michigan and Canada along the southern shore of Lake Superior. M-28 is the longest state trunkline in Michigan numbered with the "M-" prefix at 290.373 miles (467.310 km). The entire highway is listed on the National Highway System, while three sections of M-28 are part of the Lake Superior Circle Tour. M-28 also carries two memorial highway designations along its route.

Throughout its course across the Upper Peninsula, M-28 passes through forested woodlands, bog swamps, urbanized areas, and along the Lake Superior shoreline. Sections of roadway cross the Ottawa National Forest and both units of the Hiawatha National Forest. Some of the other landmarks accessible from M-28 include the Seney Stretch, Seney National Wildlife Refuge and several historic bridges.

M-28 is an original trunkline designation, dating to the 1919 formation of the state's trunkline system. The original highway was much shorter than the current version. M-28 was expanded eastward to the Sault Ste. Marie area in the late 1920s. The western end has been expanded twice to different locations on the Wisconsin state line. Other changes along the routing have led to the creation of three different business loops at various times, with one still extant. Future changes, proposed by Marquette County but not accepted by the Michigan Department of Transportation (MDOT), could see M-28 rerouted over County Road 480 (CR 480).

== Route description ==
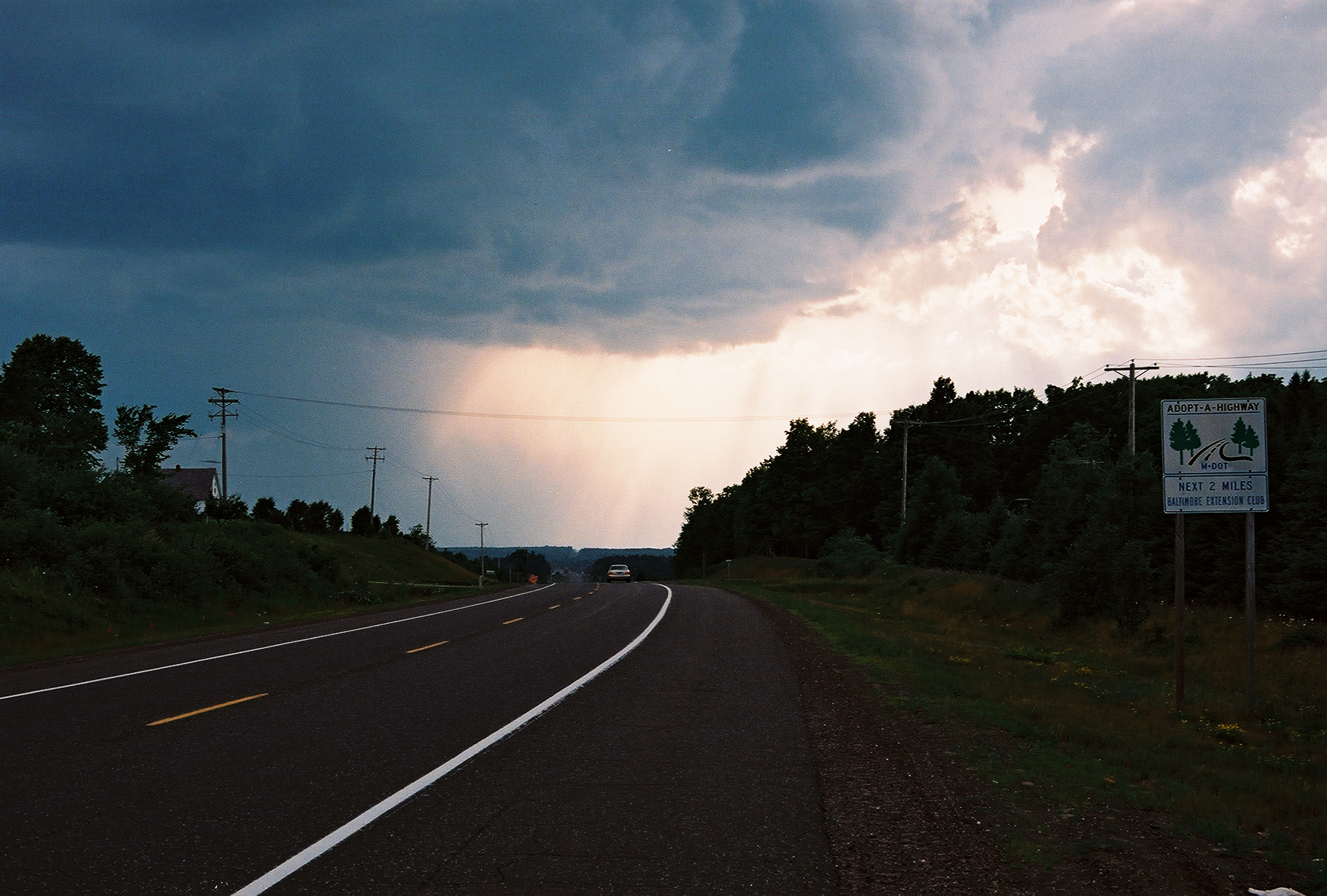
Clouds brewing over M-28 in western Ontonagon County

M-28 is a major highway for Michigan and Canadian traffic along the south shore of Lake Superior. It forms the northern half of a pair of primary trunklines linking the Upper Peninsula from end to end; US 2 is the southern partner. The 290.373-mile (467.310 km) highway comprises mostly two lanes, undivided except for sections that are concurrent with US 41 near Marquette. The "Marquette Bypass" portion of US 41/M-28 is a four-lane expressway, and segments of the highway in Marquette County have four lanes. The entire route is part of the National Highway System, and three sections of the trunkline are part of the Lake Superior Circle Tour.

=== Western terminus to Shingleton ===
In the west, M-28 begins at a signalized intersection with US 2 in Wakefield. Heading north, the highway passes Sunday Lake heading out of town. After crossing into southwestern Ontonagon County and the Eastern Time Zone, the trunkline highway skirts the northern shore of Lake Gogebic, running concurrently with M-64. The first section of M-28 designated as a part of the Lake Superior Circle Tour is from the western terminus to the eastern junction with M-64 in Bergland, where the Circle Tour turns north along M-64, leaving M-28. Here, M-28 has its lowest traffic counts; within the 2013 MDOT survey, the road is listed with only an average annual daily traffic (AADT) of 1,425 vehicles on a section of highway between Bergland and the US 45 intersection in Bruce Crossing. The trunkline runs through heavily forested areas of southern Houghton and Baraga counties. At the eastern junction with US 41 near Covington, M-28 receives the Circle Tour designation again and exits the Ottawa National Forest.

In Baraga and Marquette counties, US 41/M-28 passes through hilly terrain before entering the urban areas of Ishpeming, Negaunee and Marquette. Approximately 13,000–17,000 vehicles use this section from Ishpeming eastward through Negaunee. West of the city of Marquette, US 41/M-28 had a peak 2013 AADT of 32,805 vehicles in Marquette Township along a retail and business corridor. This peak level is sustained until the start of the Marquette Bypass, where the traffic returns to the 16,500-vehicle and higher levels seen in Ishpeming and Negaunee. South of the city of Marquette, traffic counts once again climb to 19,620 vehicles. In Chocolay Township the AADT drops to 8,840 vehicles before tapering off to 3,065 vehicles by the county line.

At the Ishpeming–Negaunee city line, M-28 changes memorial highway designations. From the western terminus to this point, M-28 is called the "Veterans Memorial Highway", but it becomes the "D. J. Jacobetti Memorial Highway" to honor the longest-serving member of the Michigan Legislature, Dominic J. Jacobetti. The Jacobetti Highway designation ends at the eastern M-123 junction in Chippewa County.

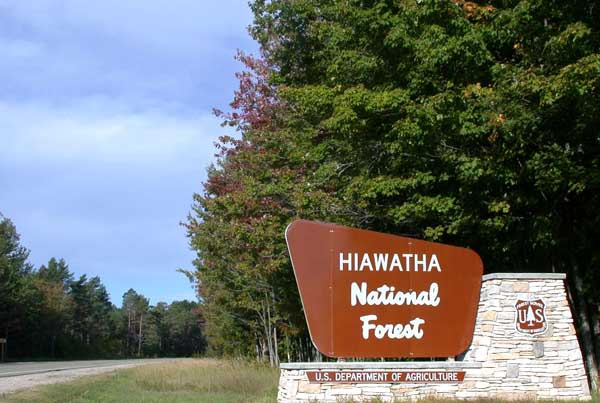
Hiawatha National Forest road sign on M-28/M-94 in Alger County west of Shingleton

Between Marquette and Munising, M-28 closely parallels the Lake Superior shoreline, providing scenic views of the lake and its "lonesome sandy beaches". The Lakenenland sculpture park is located in Chocolay Township near Shot Point in eastern Marquette County. This roadside attraction is owned by Tom Lakenen and features fanciful works of art made of scrap iron. Near the community of Au Train, M-28 crosses into the western unit of the Hiawatha National Forest. West of Munising is a ferry dock offering transport to the Grand Island National Recreation Area, and at Munising there is easy access to Pictured Rocks National Lakeshore. The roadway also features variable-message signs to warn motorists of winter weather-related traffic closures along the lakeshore. Installed at the US 41 and M-94 junctions, the signs advise motorists which sections of roadway are closed. Per MDOT policy, only snowplows are allowed on these sections during a closure. The highway exits the Hiawatha National Forest at the Alger County–Schoolcraft County line along the Seney Stretch.

=== Seney Stretch ===
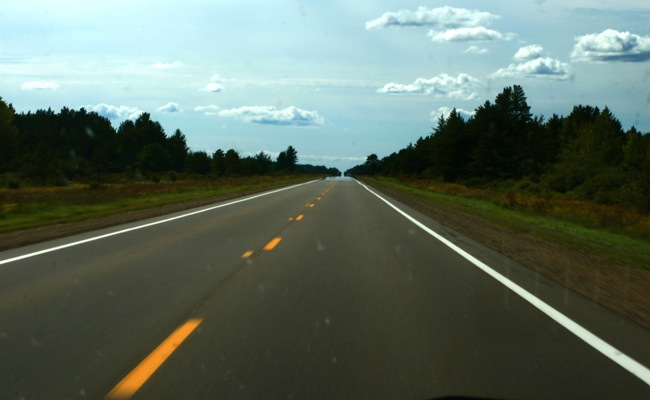
The Seney Stretch along M-28

The portion of M-28 between Seney and Shingleton, called the Seney Stretch, is 25 miles (40 km) of "straight-as-an-arrow highway" across the Great Manistique Swamp, "though others claim it's 50 miles [80 km], only because it seems longer." The Seney Stretch is the longest such section of highway in the state, and "one of the longest stretches of curveless highway east of the Mississippi." The highway is often cited as the "state's most boring route" according to the Michigan Economic Development Corporation (MEDC) and Hunts' Guide. The straightness and flatness over a great distance are given as reasons for the reputation of this stretch as boring.

The road across the swamp was constructed parallel to the line of the Duluth, South Shore and Atlantic Railway (later the Soo Line Railroad). It was first numbered as a part of M-25 when that designation was used along today's M-28 east of US 41. The most significant changes made to the stretch since its original construction were the addition of passing relief lanes and a full-scale, year-round rest area in 1999.

Part of the Seney Stretch forms the northern border of the Seney National Wildlife Refuge. Established in 1935, this refuge is a managed wetland in Schoolcraft County. It has an area of 95,212 acres (385 km^{2}), and contains the Strangmoor Bog National Natural Landmark within its boundaries.

=== Seney to eastern terminus ===
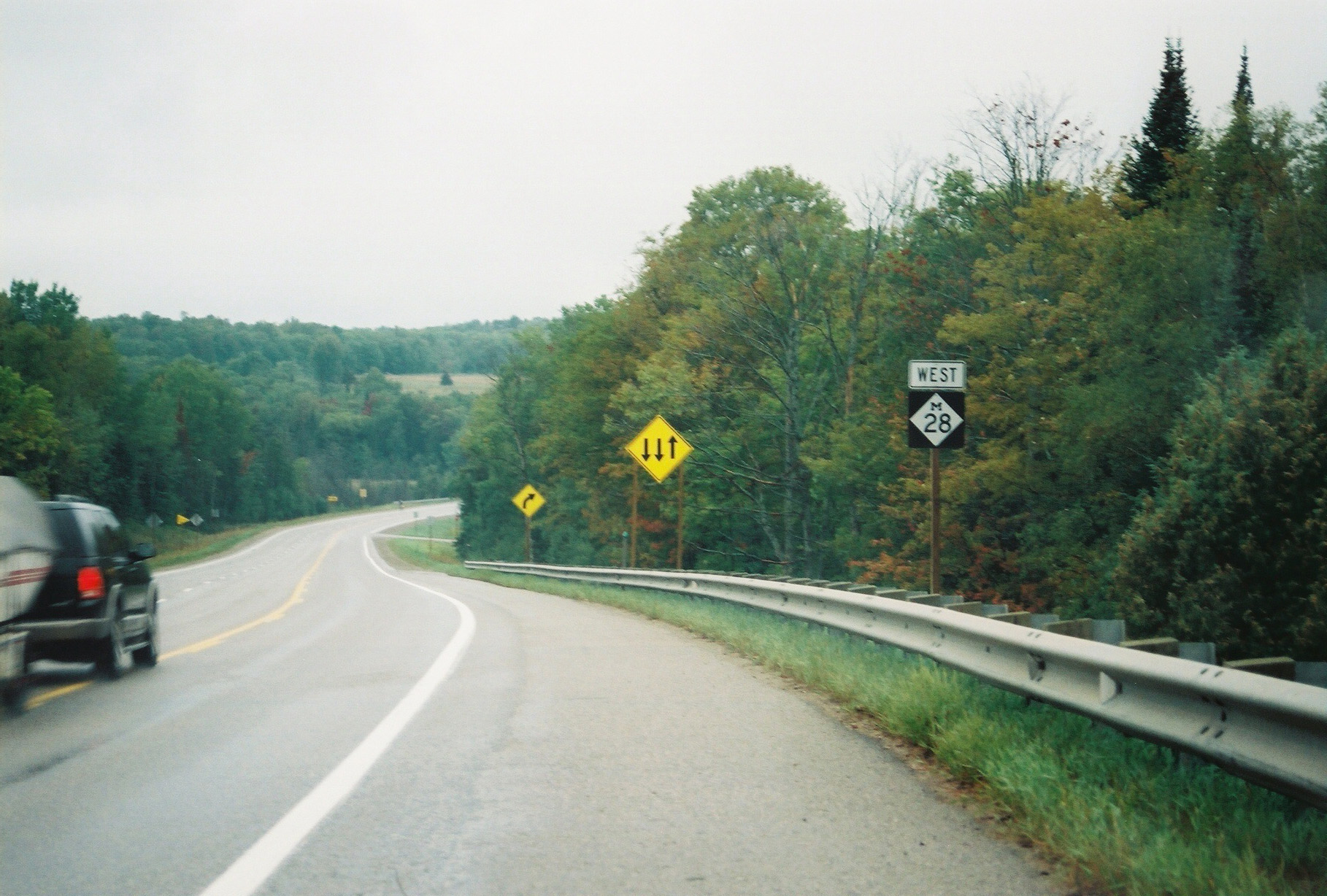
A passing lane on M-28 westbound near McMillan

Past Seney, M-28 once again enters woodlands on the eastern end of the Upper Peninsula. In Luce County, the roadway passes through the community of McMillan en route to Newberry. The Circle Tour departs M-28 to follow M-123 at Newberry, looping north to the Tahquamenon Falls State Park. East of town, the road passes Luce County Airport off of Luce CR 399. From there, M-28 crosses the east and west branches of the Sage River and passes south of Soo Junction, before the Chippewa County border.

In Chippewa County, M-28 begins bending slightly east-northeastward. Hulbert Lake is located south of Hulbert; north of the lake, the highway enters the eastern unit of the Hiawatha National Forest. At the eastern junction of M-28 and M-123 near Eckerman and Strongs, the Circle Tour returns to M-28 and the D.J. Jacobetti Memorial Highway designation ends. The highway leaves the eastern unit of the Hiawatha National Forest between the communities of Raco and Brimley. M-221 leads north from the main highway on an old routing of M-28 to connect to the community of Brimley and the Bay Mills Indian Community. Brimley State Park is just east of Brimley on the old 6 Mile Road alignment of M-28. The highway meets Interstate 75 (I-75) at exit 386, and the Lake Superior Circle Tour departs M-28 to follow I-75. This interchange is just west of H-63/Mackinac Trail, a former segment of US 2. M-28 continues three miles (4.8 km) farther to its eastern terminus with M-129.

=== Services ===
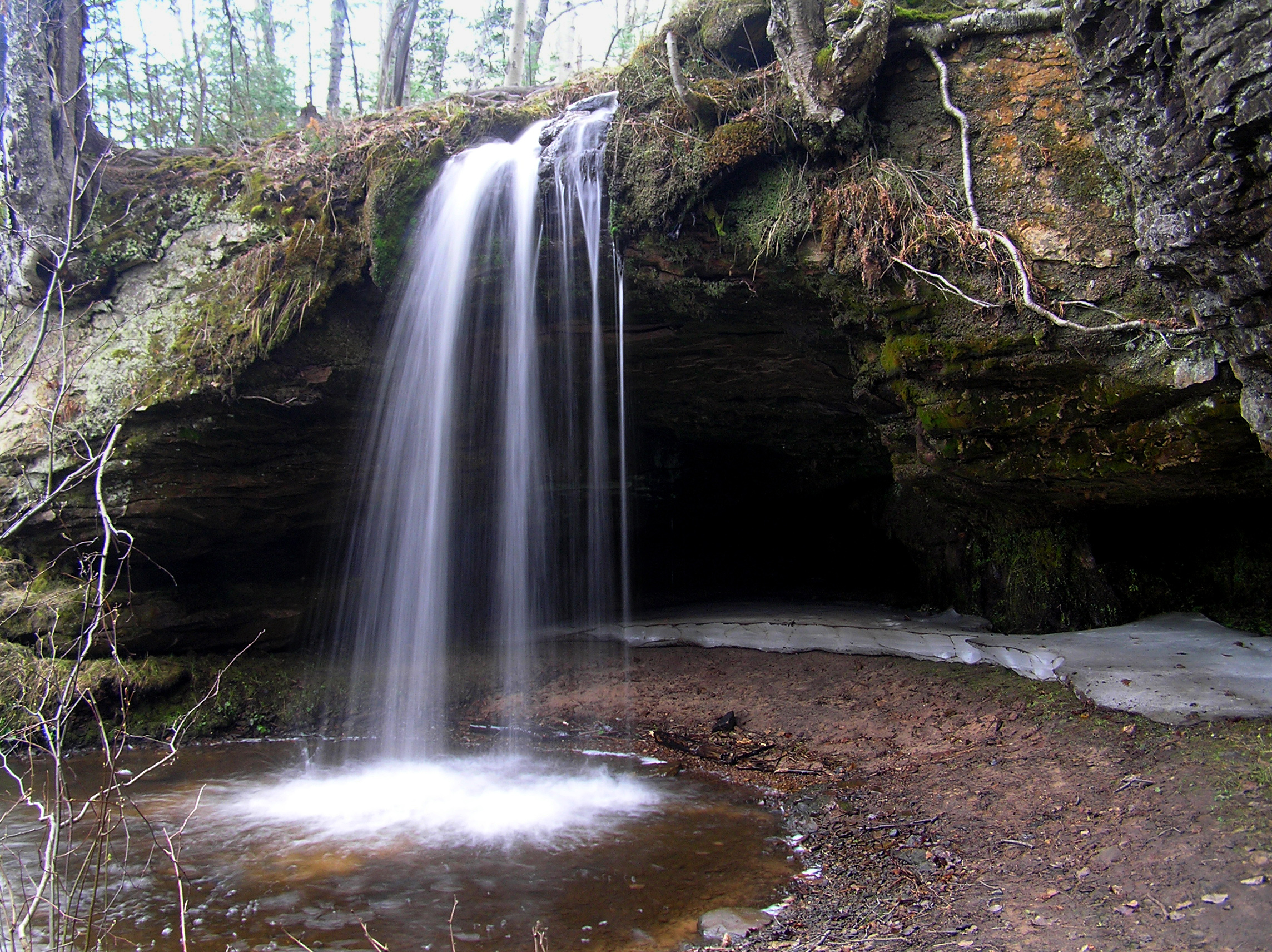
Scott Falls next to a roadside park near Au Train

Along the routing of M-28, MDOT has established several roadside parks and rest areas. Two of these are in Ontonagon County near Ewen and Trout Creek. A park with a picnic area and a footbridge lies near Tioga Creek in Baraga County east of the US 41 junction. In Michigamme a scenic turnout and a roadside park overlook Lake Michigamme, and along Lake Superior south of Marquette is a tourist information center built as a log cabin. East of the H-01 junction in Au Train is a roadside park that includes Scott Falls. Further east, a year-round rest area is located on the western end of the Seney Stretch. Three other roadside parks lie east of Harvey in Shelter Bay, on the shores of Deer Lake and west of Newberry.

== History ==
=== Mainline history ===
Formed by July 1, 1919, M-28 began in Wakefield at a junction with then M-12 and ran roughly along the current alignment to end at M-15, 6.5 miles (10.5 km) east of Covington. These two termini roughly correspond to the modern US 2 and western US 41 junctions respectively. M-28 was extended in 1927 along US 41 into Marquette County and east over M-25 through Chatham, Munising, and Newberry, before ending in downtown Sault Ste. Marie. At Negaunee, M-28 took the former routing of M-15 between Negaunee and Marquette for 10 miles (16 km) while US 41 ran along a portion of M-35. This southern loop routing of M-28 lasted until approximately 1936, when M-28 was moved to US 41, and the former route became CR 492. A new routing of M-28 in the Newberry area opened later that year, and a new M-28A (later Bus. M-28) existed until 1953. Another realignment in 1937 marked the transfer of M-28 out of downtown Ishpeming and Negaunee. This former routing later became Bus. M-28.

M-178
- Location: Wetmore–Munising
- Length: 1.036 mi (1.667 km)
- Existed: c. 1936–1941

In the late 1930s, a highway numbered M-178 was designated between M-28 south of Munising to M-94 in town. In 1941, the routings of M-28 and M-94 were reversed between Harvey and Munising, and M-28 supplanted the M-178 designation completely. Since then, M-28 has run along the lakeshore through Au Train. M-28 was extended along US 2 to the state line at Ironwood, and the eastern end of M-28 through Brimley was moved to a new alignment ending at US 2, in Dafter in 1942. The eastern end was moved along US 2 back to Sault Ste. Marie in 1948, though the terminus was returned to Dafter in 1950.

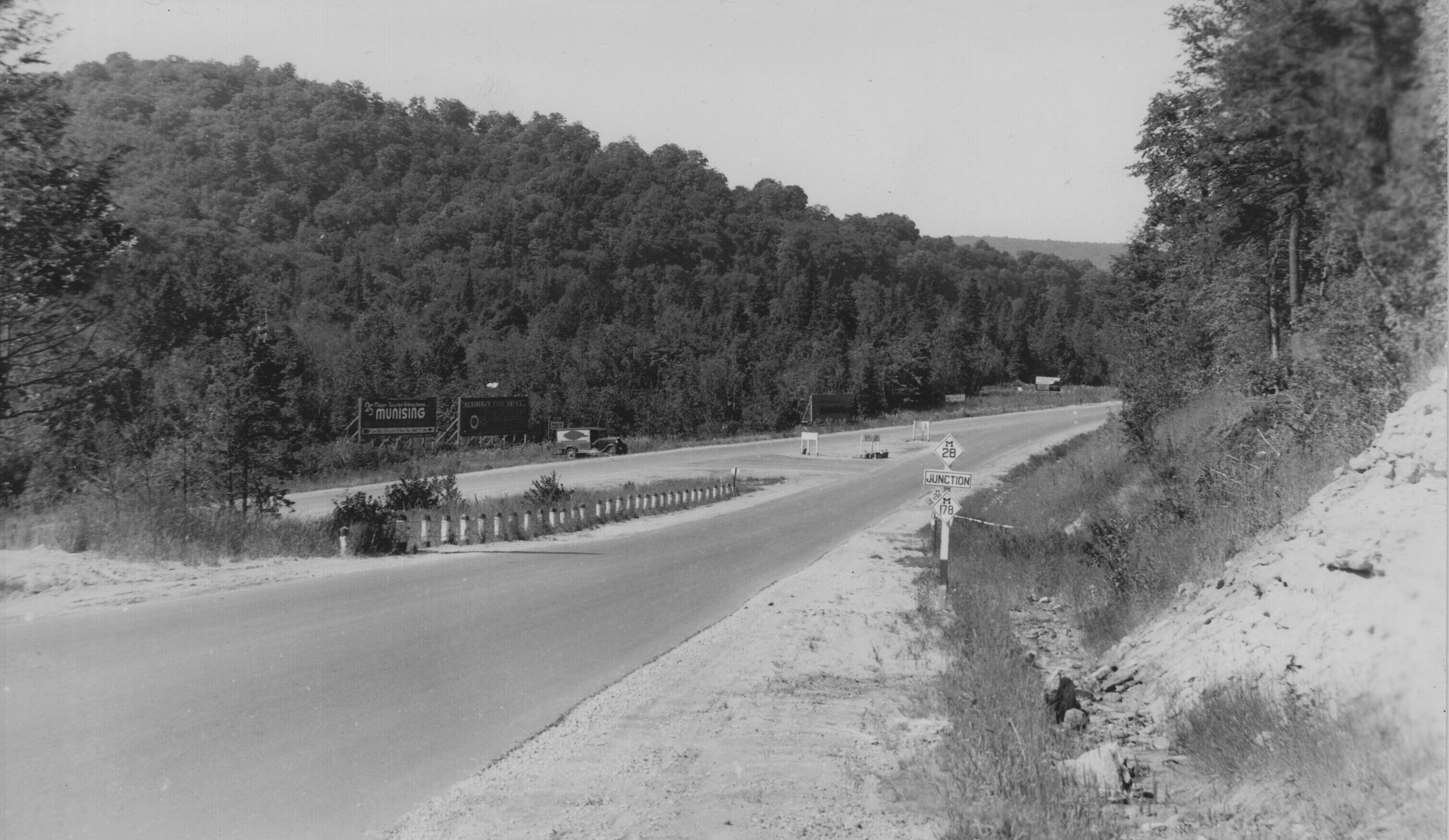
Junction between M-28 and M-178 just south of Munising before 1941

From 1952 to 1962, M-28 crossed US 2 at Wakefield going south and stopped at the Wisconsin border, connecting with a county road. This segment of the highway (now Gogebic CR 519) was transferred back to the county in 1962. M-94 previously looped along Munising-Van Meer-Shingleton Road (now H-58 and H-15) north of M-28 between Munising and Shingleton. This routing was abandoned on November 7, 1963 in favor of the current concurrency. The last significant change to the M-28 routing occurred on March 3, 1989, when the eastern terminus was moved east to M-129.

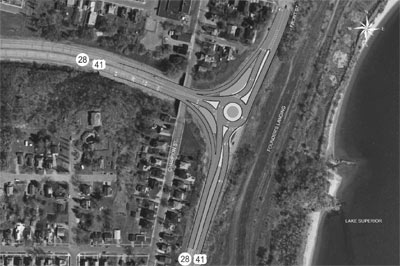
Diagram of the roundabout in Marquette as proposed

MDOT unveiled plans on March 31, 2009, to rebuild the intersection between Front Street and the eastern end of the Marquette Bypass during 2010. The previous intersection configuration dated back to the 1960s and had been labeled as "dangerous and [causing] significant traffic delays" by the designers of the replacement. A traffic study concluded in 2007 that the intersection would need either the roundabout or a traffic signal with several turning lanes to accommodate the traffic needs in the area. MDOT decided in favor of a two-lane, 150-foot (46 m) roundabout retaining the right-turn lanes from the previous intersection layout. These lanes will be used by right-turning traffic to bypass the circle at the center of the intersection.

Construction started on the project in May. A section of the intersection was opened in July to traffic from the south that turns west. The lanes northbound into downtown were opened in the beginning of August, and the city held a ribbon cutting ceremony on August 19, 2010. The remaining lanes were opened the next day.

=== Historic bridges ===
MDOT has highlighted five historic bridges along the route of M-28 on the MDOT website. In Interior Township, Ontonagon County, the highway crosses the Ontonagon River over a bridge built in 1929. Designed by the State Highway Department and built by the firm of Meads and Anderson, the Ontonagon River Bridge is one of only three steel arch bridges in Michigan. The main span arch is 150 feet (46 m) long. A former routing of M-28 in Covington Township crosses the Rock River. Although this section was bypassed by a new alignment of the trunkline in 1924, the bridge remains complete "with corbeled bulkheads and six panels recessed in the concrete spandrel walls." The corbels and spandrels are decorative features found in the concrete sides of the bridge.

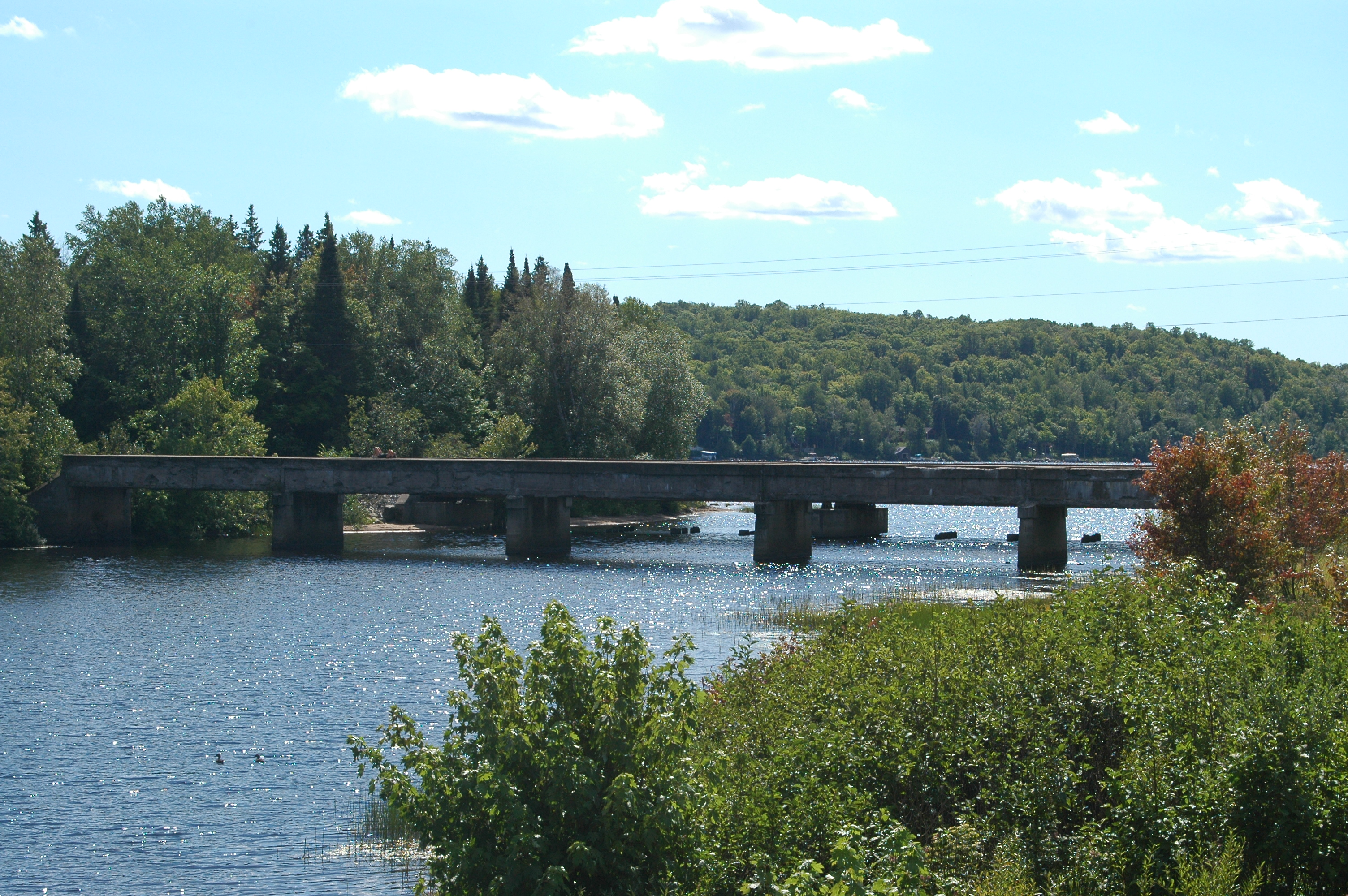
Abandoned Peshekee River Bridge in Michigamme Township

Today, drivers cannot use the Peshekee River Bridge south of US 41/M-28 in western Marquette County's Michigamme Township. The bridge was listed on the National Register of Historic Places in 1999 as "Trunk Line Bridge No. 1" for its engineering and architectural significance. MDOT has listed it as "one of Michigan's most important vehicular bridges." It was the first bridge designed by the Michigan State Highway Department, the forerunner to MDOT, in 1914. It was bypassed by a newer bridge built over the Peshekee River on US 41/M-28 subsequently abandoned as a roadway. The replacement bridge was bypassed and demolished in 1995.

The next historic bridge listed by MDOT along M-28 is over the Sand River in Onota Township in Alger County. While not visible to motorists, the bridge, constructed in 1939, is the longest rural rigid-frame span in Michigan. Most bridges of this type were built in urban locations, and soil conditions in the state limit locations for this style of bridge. The bridge over the East Branch of the Tahquamenon River in Chippewa County was built in 1926 as a "formative exercise in what would evolve into a state standard design." The 55-foot (17 m) bridge was built with nine lines of I-beams encased in concrete. Only one other bridge in Michigan was built with such concrete encasement.

== Future ==
CR 480 in Marquette County

In the August 24, 2005 edition, the Marquette Mining Journal reported that the Marquette County Board and the County Road Commission were negotiating with MDOT to transfer the jurisdiction of Marquette County Road 480 to the state. Several routing options have been discussed, though all would make CR 480 a part of M-28. Cost was the primary reason given behind rerouting M-28 along CR 480. "The road commission receives about $50,000 (Note: Equivalent to $79,000 in 2025.) a year in state gas tax money but spends about $100,000 (Note: Equivalent to $158,000 in 2025.) to maintain CR 480 because of the type and volume of traffic it receives." Handing CR 480 over to the state would shift the maintenance costs to the state, as well.

MDOT has indicated that it has not requested jurisdiction, but rather if it assumed control of the route, the community would need to support a through-route. Several proposals have arisen, including creating a "spur" from US 41/M-28 through the east end of Ishpeming to meet CR 480 west of Negaunee. This spur would pass through recently reopened former mining "caving grounds", and to the south of the Mather A & B Mine complex. According to Gerry Corkin, Marquette County Board Chairman, "the land that was purchased by Ishpeming and Negaunee, the mining company land, this has the potential to help in the development of that if this is compatible. I think both cities will be interested in taking a look at what the land uses are and where this [spur] would push through."

The spur proposal would open land to development between the downtown areas of the two cities. If jurisdiction is transferred, and M-28 is routed over CR 480 as proposed, M-28 would leave the concurrency with US 41 near Teal Lake in Negaunee, and cross the caving grounds west of downtown to connect to Rail Street. Rail Street would serve as the connector to CR 480, which ends at the intersection of Rail and Ann streets and Healey Avenue. Proposals indicate two routing options for the east end of CR 480. One would route M-28 back along US 41 from Beaver Grove north of the CR 480 eastern terminus to the existing M-28 in Harvey. A second would route it along CR 551/Cherry Creek Road from CR 480 to M-28 in Harvey.

== Business loops ==
There have been three business loops for M-28: Ishpeming–Negaunee, Marquette and Newberry. Only the business loop serving Ishpeming and Negaunee is still a state-maintained trunkline. US 41/M-28 was relocated to bypass the two cities' downtowns in 1937. The highway through downtown Ishpeming and Negaunee later carried the ALT US 41/ALT M-28 designation before being designated Bus. M-28 in 1958. The western end of the business loop was transferred to local government control when Bus. M-28 was moved along Lakeshore Drive in 1999.

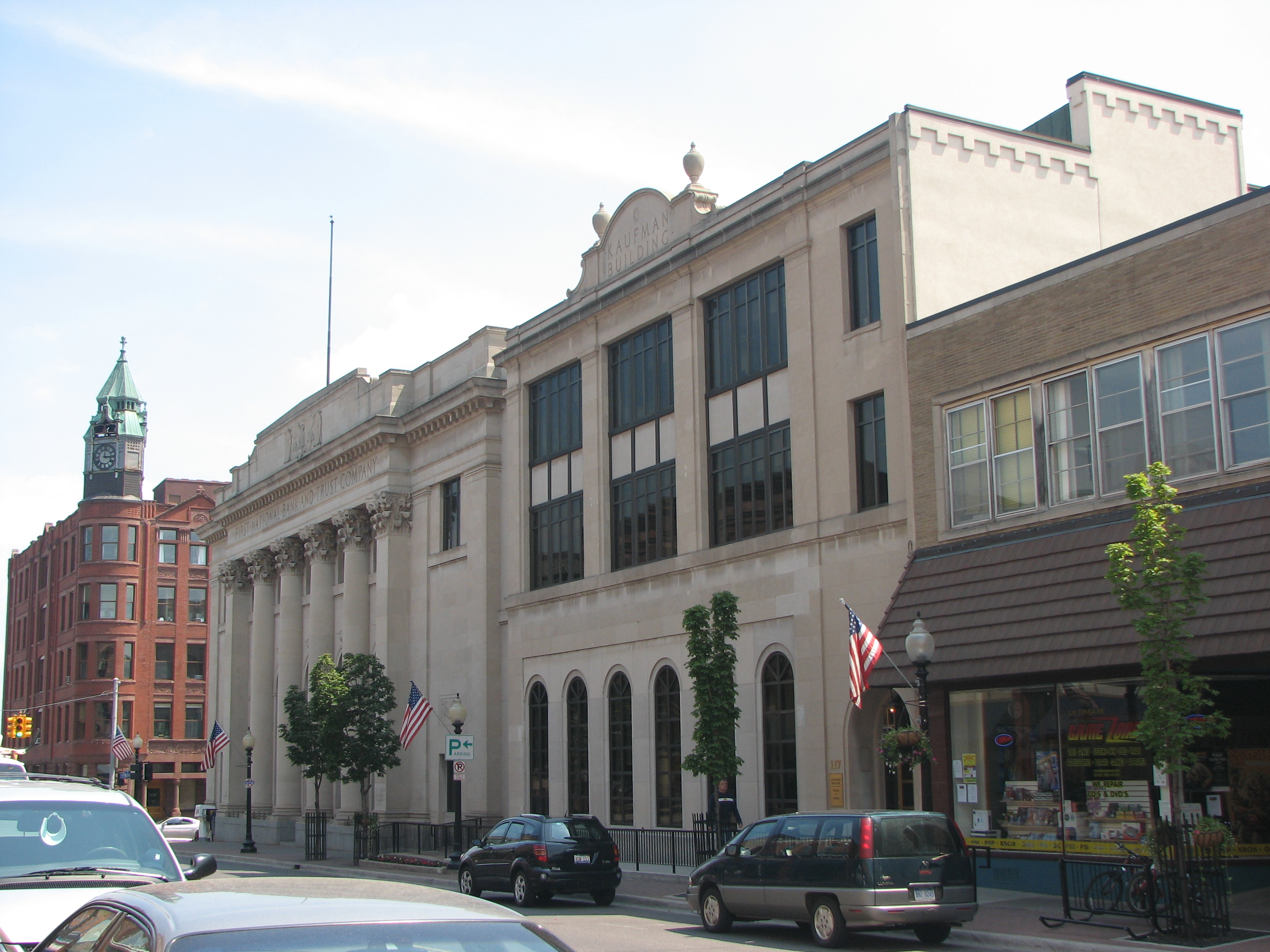
The former Bus. US 41 along Washington Street in downtown Marquette

Bus. US 41 in Marquette was first shown on a map in 1964 after the construction of the Marquette Bypass. It was later designated Bus. US 41/Bus. M-28 on a map in 1975; this second designation was removed from maps by 1982. The entire business loop was turned back to local control in a "route swap" between the City of Marquette and MDOT announced in early 2005. The proposal transferred jurisdiction on the unsigned M-554 and the business route from the state to the city. The state would take jurisdiction over a segment of McClellan Avenue to be used to extend M-553 to US 41/M-28. In addition, MDOT would pay $2.5 million (equivalent to $3.96 million in 2025) for reconstruction work planned for 2007. The transfer would increase Marquette's operational and maintenance liability expenses by $26,000 (equivalent to $41,000 in 2025) and place the financial burden of the future replacement of a stop light on the city. On October 10, 2005, MDOT and Marquette transferred jurisdiction over the three roadways. As a result, Bus. US 41 was decommissioned when the local government took control over Washington and Front streets. As a result of the decommissioning, the 2006 maps did not show the now former business loop.

The Newberry Bus. M-28 was designated from 1936 until 1952 as M-28A. The MSHD maps of the time showed it signed as Bus. M-28 in 1952 before it was turned back to local control in 1953.

== Major intersections ==
County	Location	mi	km	Destinations	Notes
Gogebic	Wakefield	0.000	0.000	US 2 / LSCT west (Putnam Street) – Ironwood, Iron River CR 519 south (Sunday Lake Street)	Western end of LSCT concurrency
Ontonagon	Merriweather	16.281	26.202	M-64 south – Marenisco	Western end of M-64 concurrency
Ontonagon	Bergland	20.422	32.866	M-64 north / LSCT north (Ash Street) – White Pine, Ontonagon	Eastern end of M-64 and LSCT concurrencies
Ontonagon	Bruce Crossing	39.990	64.358	US 45 – Ontonagon, Watersmeet	
Houghton	Kenton	56.394– 56.596	90.757– 91.082	FFH 16	Marked as H-16 on MDOT maps; short concurrency through Kenton
Baraga	Covington	74.330	119.623	US 141 south – Crystal Falls, Iron Mountain	Western end of US 141 concurrency
Baraga	Covington	78.484	126.308	US 41 north / LSCT north – Baraga, Houghton US 141 south	Northern terminus of US 141; western end of US 41 and LSCT concurrencies
Marquette	Humboldt Township	106.927	172.082	M-95 south – Republic, Iron Mountain	Northern terminus of M-95
Marquette	Ishpeming	118.614	190.891	Bus. M-28 (Lakeshore Drive) – Ishpeming	Western terminus of Bus. M-28
Marquette	Negaunee	122.215	196.686	Bus. M-28 (Teal Lake Avenue) – Negaunee	Eastern terminus of Bus. M-28
Marquette	Negaunee	122.957	197.880	CR 492 east (Maas Street) – Marquette	Former routing along Marquette–Negaunee Road
Marquette	Negaunee Township	125.840	202.520	M-35 south – Palmer, Gwinn	Northern terminus of M-35
Marquette	Marquette Township	130.486	209.997	CR 492 – Negaunee	
Marquette	Marquette	131.930	212.321	Washington Street – Downtown Marquette	Western terminus of former Bus. US 41; no access from westbound Washington Street to eastbound US 41/M-28
Marquette	Marquette	132.312	212.936	M-553 south (McClellan Avenue) – K.I. Sawyer, Gwinn	Northern terminus of M-553
Marquette	Marquette	133.674	215.127	Front Street	Eastern terminus of former Bus. US 41
Marquette	Harvey	137.925	221.969	US 41 south – Escanaba	Eastern end of US 41 concurrency
Alger	Onota Township	159.637	256.911	H-01 south (Rock River Road) – Chatham	Northern terminus of H-01
Alger	Au Train	164.541	264.803	H-03 south (Au Train Road) – Au Train	Northern terminus of H-03
Alger	Munising	175.903	283.088	H-58 east (Munising Road) – Grand Marais	Western terminus of H-58; Provides access to Pictured Rocks National Lakeshore
Alger	Munising Township	176.939	284.756	M-94 west – Chatham	Western end of M-94 concurrency
Alger	Wetmore	178.849	287.830	H-13 / FFH 13 south (Connors Road) – Nahma	
Alger	Shingleton	186.409	299.996	M-94 south / H-15 north (Van Meer Road) – Manistique, Van Meer	Eastern end of M-94 concurrency Western end of the Seney Stretch
Schoolcraft	Hiawatha Township	195.595	314.780	H-52 north	
Schoolcraft	Seney	210.984	339.546	M-77 south – Blaney Park	Eastern end of the Seney Stretch; Eastern end of a 0.36-mile (0.58 km) concurrency to cross Fox River
Schoolcraft	Seney	211.344	340.125	M-77 north / LSCT Spur north – Grand Marais	Western end of M-77 concurrency
Luce	Lakefield Township	226.619	364.708	H-33 south (CR 135 / Manistique Lakes Road) – Germfask	Former terminus of M-135
Luce	Pentland Township	230.927	371.641	M-117 south – Engadine	Northern terminus of M-117
Luce	Pentland Township	233.916	376.451	M-123 north / LSCT north (Newberry Avenue) – Newberry	Western junction with M-123; eastern end of LSCT concurrency; provides access to Tahquamenon Falls State Park
Chippewa	Chippewa Township	257.648	414.644	M-123 / LSCT north – Paradise, Trout Lake	Eastern junction with M-123; western end of LSCT concurrency
Chippewa	Superior Township	279.943	450.525	M-221 north – Brimley	Southern terminus of M-221
Chippewa	Dafter Township	287.484	462.661	I-75 / LSCT north – Sault Ste. Marie, St. Ignace	Exit 386 on I-75; eastern end of LSCT concurrency
Chippewa	Dafter Township	287.873	463.287	H-63 (Mackinac Trail) – Sault Ste. Marie, St. Ignace	Former US 2
Chippewa	Bruce Township	290.373	467.310	M-129 (McKnight Road) / LHCT – Sault Ste. Marie, St. Ignace	
1.000 mi = 1.609 km; 1.000 km = 0.621 mi: Concurrency terminus; Incomplete access

== See also ==
- List of longest state highways in the United States
