= Horseshoe Bay Trail =

Hiking trail in Michigan, USA

Coordinates: 45°56′45″N 84°44′45″W

- Length: 6.4 mi (10.3 km)
- Location: Mackinac County, Michigan, USA
- Trailheads: Foley Creek Campground
- Use: Hiking
- Difficulty: Moderate
- Sights: A beach view of Lake Huron

Horseshoe Bay Trail is a 6.4-mile (10.3 km) trail that enters and loops through the Horseshoe Bay Wilderness. The motor-vehicle trailhead, located just outside the wilderness, is 6 miles (9.7 km) north of St. Ignace, MI.

== Trail layout ==
- 0.0 - Trailhead at Foley Creek Campground
- 1.1 - Lake Huron Shore (Trail Ends)
- 2.9 - First Point
- 3.2 - Second Point; Turnaround Point
- 6.4 - Trailhead
