= Harvey, Michigan =

- Census-designated place (CDP) & unincorporated community
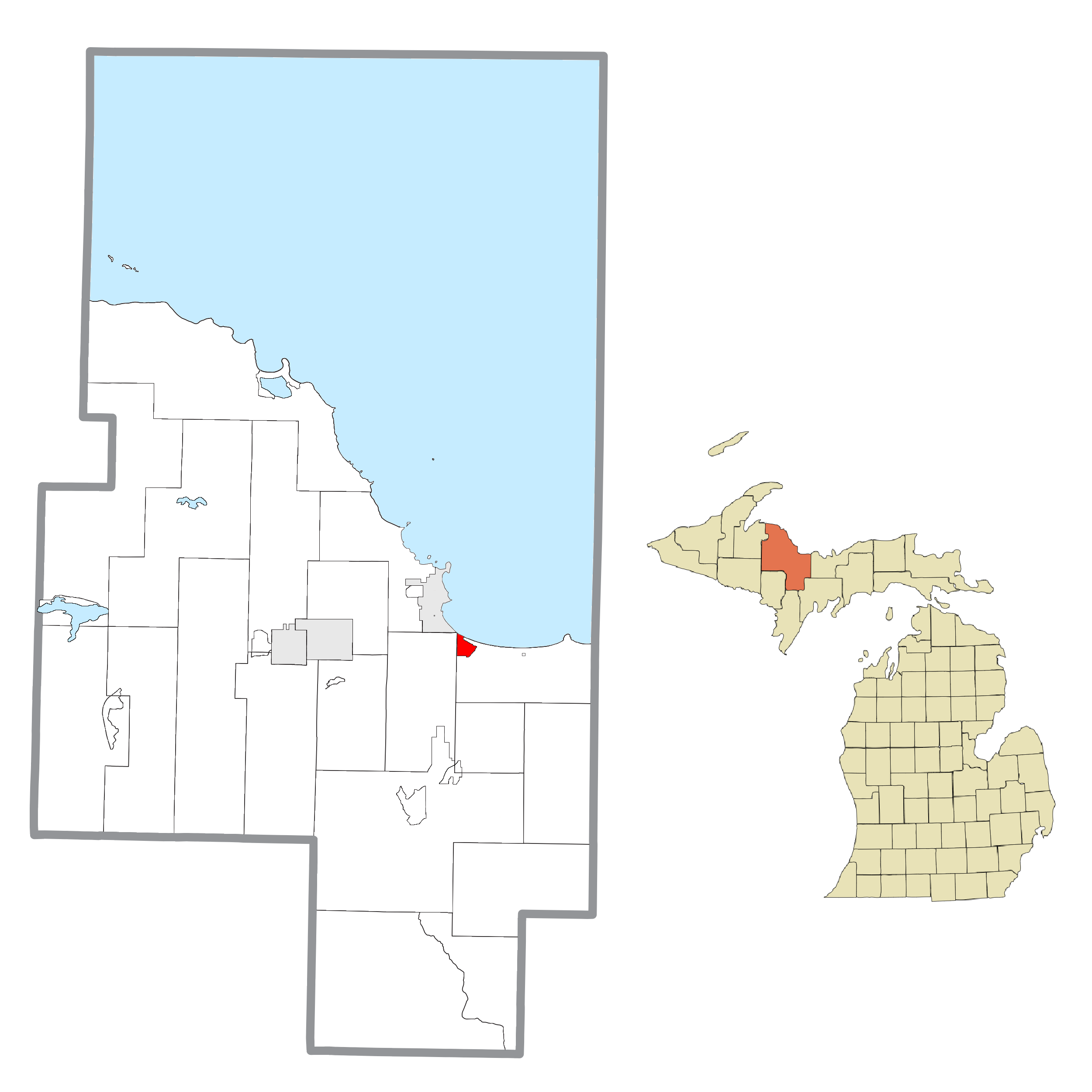
- Location within Marquette County

- Location within Michigan Location within the United States
- Coordinates: 46°29′41″N 87°21′16″W
- Country: United States
- State: Michigan
- County: Marquette
- Townships: Chocolay, Sands

Area
  - Total: 7.31 sq mi (18.93 km^{2})
  - Land: 6.74 sq mi (17.45 km^{2})
  - Water: 0.57 sq mi (1.48 km^{2})
- Elevation: 650 ft (198 m)

Population (2020)
  - Total: 3,244
  - Density: 481.6/sq mi (185.96/km^{2})
- Time zone: UTC-5 (Eastern (EST))
  - Summer (DST): UTC-4 (EDT)
- ZIP Code: 49855 (Marquette)
- Area code: 906
- FIPS code: 26-37080
- GNIS feature ID: 0627901

Harvey is a census-designated place (CDP) in Marquette County in the U.S. state of Michigan. The population was 3,244 as of the 2020 census, up from 1,393 in 2010, before the CDP was enlarged by the Census Bureau. The CDP is located within Chocolay and Sands townships.

Originally called "Harvey Location", the community is a southwest suburb of Marquette at the junction of U.S. Route 41 and M-28.

== Geography ==
The community is in eastern Marquette County, bordered to the northwest by the city of Marquette and to the northeast by Lake Superior. The Chocolay River forms the northern part of the eastern border of the community, from Cedar Creek to the river's mouth at Lake Superior. According to the United States Census Bureau, the CDP has a total area of 7.31 square miles (18.93 km^{2}), of which 6.74 square miles (17.46 km^{2}) are land and 0.57 square miles (1.48 km^{2}), or 7.84%, are water.

US Highwah 41 and State Highway M-28 pass through Harvey, joining in the center of town and heading northwest 5 miles (8 km) to the center of Marquette. US 41 leads southeast 52 miles (84 km) to Gladstone, while M-28 leads east 38 miles (61 km) to Munising.

== Demographics ==
Historical population
Census	Pop.	Note	%±
1980	1,341		—
1990	1,377		2.7%
2000	1,321		−4.1%
2010	1,393		5.5%
2020	3,244		132.9%
U.S. Decennial Census

=== 2020 census ===
As of the 2020 census, Harvey had a population of 3,244. The median age was 43.7 years. 19.5% of residents were under the age of 18 and 21.3% of residents were 65 years of age or older. For every 100 females there were 101.1 males, and for every 100 females age 18 and over there were 102.1 males age 18 and over.

69.0% of residents lived in urban areas, while 31.0% lived in rural areas.

There were 1,346 households in Harvey, of which 26.2% had children under the age of 18 living in them. Of all households, 58.7% were married-couple households, 15.8% were households with a male householder and no spouse or partner present, and 18.5% were households with a female householder and no spouse or partner present. About 23.4% of all households were made up of individuals and 10.6% had someone living alone who was 65 years of age or older.

There were 1,459 housing units, of which 7.7% were vacant. The homeowner vacancy rate was 1.2% and the rental vacancy rate was 17.5%.

Racial composition as of the 2020 census
Race	Number	Percent
White	2,963	91.3%
Black or African American	10	0.3%
American Indian and Alaska Native	71	2.2%
Asian	10	0.3%
Native Hawaiian and Other Pacific Islander	0	0.0%
Some other race	11	0.3%
Two or more races	179	5.5%
Hispanic or Latino (of any race)	31	1.0%

=== 2000 census ===
As of the census of 2000, there were 1,321 people, 565 households, and 346 families residing in the CDP. The population density was 646.9 inhabitants per square mile (249.8/km^{2}). There were 646 housing units at an average density of 316.4 per square mile (122.2/km^{2}). The racial makeup of the CDP was 93.79% White, 1.06% African American, 2.42% Native American, 0.61% Asian, 0.38% from other races, and 1.74% from two or more races. Hispanic or Latino of any race were 0.61% of the population.

There were 565 households, out of which 33.1% had children under the age of 18 living with them, 46.2% were married couples living together, 9.9% had a female householder with no husband present, and 38.6% were non-families. 34.3% of all households were made up of individuals, and 10.3% had someone living alone who was 65 years of age or older. The average household size was 2.34 and the average family size was 3.00.

In the CDP, the population was spread out, with 25.8% under the age of 18, 8.4% from 18 to 24, 30.4% from 25 to 44, 24.1% from 45 to 64, and 11.3% who were 65 years of age or older. The median age was 37 years. For every 100 females, there were 103.9 males. For every 100 females age 18 and over, there were 102.5 males.

The median income for a household in the CDP was $37,321, and the median income for a family was $48,365. Males had a median income of $41,471 versus $25,536 for females. The per capita income for the CDP was $18,733. About 2.9% of families and 7.0% of the population were below the poverty line, including 1.3% of those under age 18 and none of those age 65 or over.
