= M-28–Sand River Bridge =

- U.S. National Register of Historic Places
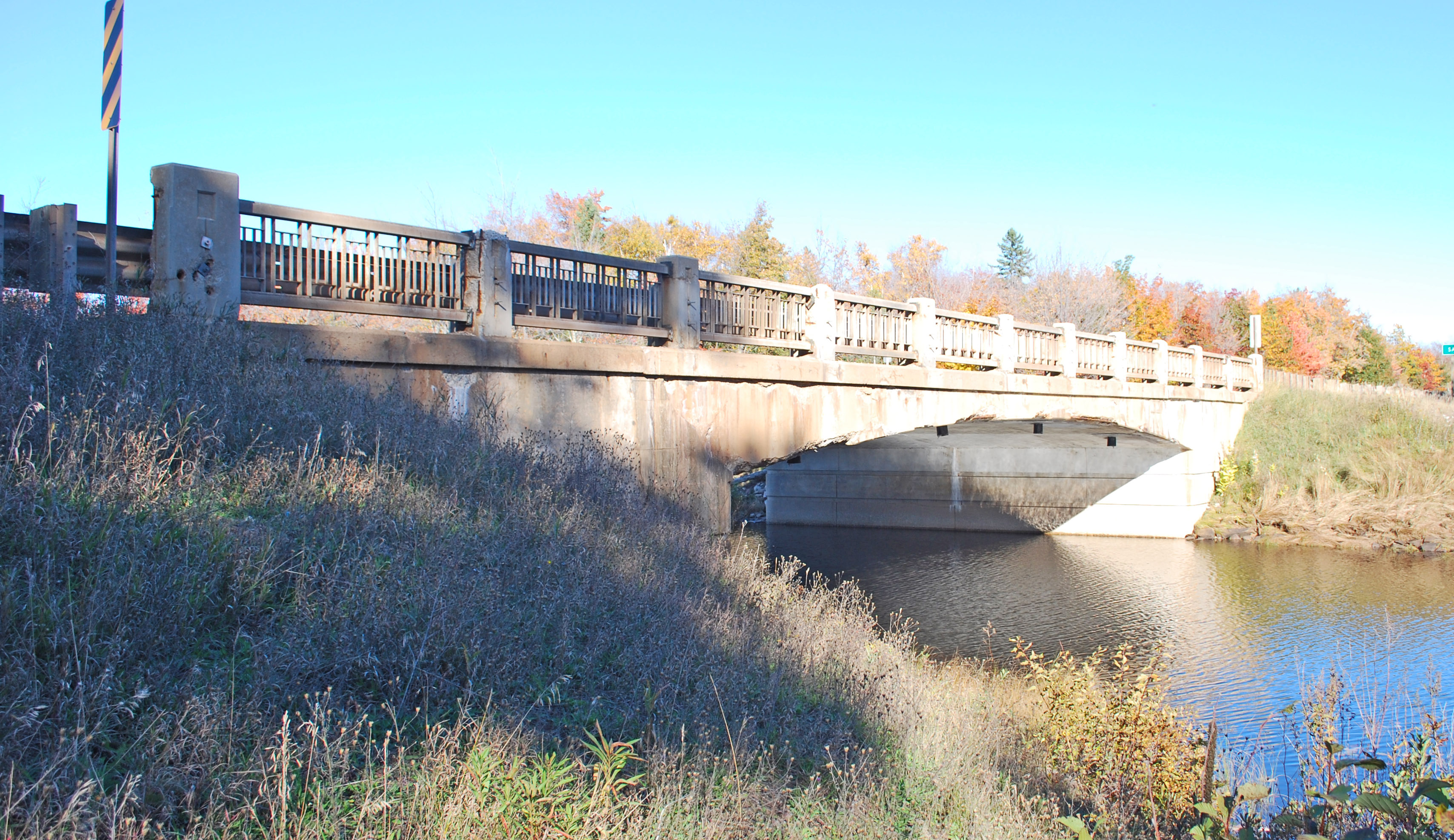

- Location within Michigan Location within the United States
- Interactive map
- Location: M-28 over Sand River, Onota Township, Michigan
- Coordinates: 46°29′42″N 87°6′27″W
- Area: less than one acre
- Built: 1939
- Built by: Alpine Excavating Company
- Architect: Michigan State Highway Department
- Architectural style: concrete rigid frame bridge
- MPS: Highway Bridges of Michigan MPS
- NRHP reference No.: 99001460
- Added to NRHP: November 30, 1999

The M-28–Sand River Bridge is a bridge located on M-28 over the Sand River in Onota Township, Michigan. It was listed on the National Register of Historic Places in 1999.

== History ==
The M-28–Sand River Bridge was designed by the Michigan State Highway Department in 1939 to carry what was then M-94 over the Sand River. The Alpine Excavating Company of St. Ignace, Michigan, was awarded the construction contract, and soon began work on the substructural excavation. On June 16, 1939, a surge of water from Lake Superior flooded the abutment cofferdams, and extensive repairs had to be made. However, the bridge was completed later that year, and has carried traffic since. A later route change redesignated the roadway as part of M-28.

== Description ==
The bridge carrying M-28 over the Sand River is a medium-span concrete bridge 56 feet (17 m) long and 40.4 feet (12.3 m) wide supported by concrete abutments. The span has a shallow arch, 4 feet (1.2 m) thick at the abutments and 1 foot 8 inches (0.51 m) at the center of the span. It has a so-called rigid-frame construction, which was a new development by the highway department at the time the bridge was built. The bridge has concrete and steel guardrails and horizontal Art Moderne scoring on the sidewalls of the abutments. Despite its age, the bridge remains in excellent condition.
