= H-63 (Michigan county highway) =

County highway in Mackinac and Chippewa counties in Michigan, United States

H-63
- Mackinac Trail
- H-63 highlighted in red

Route information
- Maintained by MCRC and CCRC
- Length: 44.804 mi (72.105 km)
- Existed: c. October 5, 1970–present

Major junctions
- South end: I-75 / BL I-75 near St. Ignace
- To M-123 near St. Ignace; To M-134 near St. Ignace; M-48 near Rudyard; I-75 / M-80 in Kinross; M-28 near Dafter
- North end: BS I-75 in Sault Ste. Marie

Location
- Country: United States
- State: Michigan
- Counties: Mackinac, Chippewa

Highway system
- County-Designated Highways
← H-60	→ A-2

H-63 is a county-designated highway (CDH) in the Upper Peninsula of the US state of Michigan. The highway parallels the Interstate 75 (I-75) corridor between St. Ignace and Sault Ste. Marie. The road is called Mackinac Trail after the Upper Peninsula branch of an Indian trail used before European settlers reached the area. Originally, the roadway was built as a section of US Highway 2 (US 2) before being added to the CDH system in the 1970s.

H-63 serves as a two-lane alternative to the I-75 freeway across the eastern end of the Upper Peninsula. Between the northern side of St. Ignace, the roadway has connections to two state highways before running concurrently with M-48 near Rudyard. H-63 ends on the south side of Sault Ste. Marie.

== Route description ==
H-63 starts a winding trail at Business Loop I-75 (BL I-75) north of St. Ignace in rural Mackinac County. From there, the highway heads northward towards the Kewadin Casino. The road then passes within viewing distance of I-75 past the Horseshoe Bay Wilderness. As it continues, H-63 has a connection to the southern terminus of M-123 with access to I-75 via a connecting road to M-123. After crossing to the west side of I-75, H-63 has access to I-75 via a connecting road to the western terminus of M-134. The CDH runs to the north and into Chippewa County. As it does so, H-63 turns away from I-75 as the latter curves northeastward. South of Rudyard and into center of the community, H-63 runs concurrently with M-48 for about three miles (4.8 km).

From Rudyard northward, H-63 turns northeasterly toward, and runs parallel to, I-75. At Kinross, there is an interchange between I-75 and M-80; H-63 has a brief concurrency with M-80 so that the latter can connect to all of the ramps in the interchange. The trail then crosses to the eastern side of I-75. Near Dafter, the CDH intersects M-28. Along this section, H-63 is roughly a half mile (0.8 km) away from the I-75 freeway at any given point as it continues northward to the Sault Ste. Marie area. H-63 terminates at its intersection with Business Spur I-75 (BS I-75) on the south side of the city.

== History ==
The first transportation route in the area was the Mackinac Trail, used by Native Americans before the Europeans arrived in the area; the trail in the area was the Upper Peninsula branch of a longer route that also connected the modern-day Saginaw with Mackinaw City and the Straits of Mackinac. Until 1933, no roadway was built along the path of the Indian trail. After that year, US 2 was rerouted between St. Ignace and Sault Ste. Marie using the modern routing of H-63. This placed the Mackinac Trail on the state trunkline highway system for the first time. In 1962 and 1963, the state transferred the highway to county control when US 2 was rerouted to follow the completed I-75 freeway. With the transfer to local control, Mackinac Trail became a county road. Later, it was given the H-63 designation after October 5, 1970, as part of the County-Designated Highway System. The designation on the 1971 state map follows the routing used today.

== Major intersections ==
County	Location	mi	km	Destinations	Notes
Mackinac	St. Ignace Township	0.000	0.000	BL I-75 / LHCT to I-75 – St. Ignace, Sault Ste. Marie	
Mackinac	St. Ignace Township	4.674	7.522	To M-123 north – Trout Lake	
Mackinac	St. Ignace Township	12.015	19.336	To M-134 east / LHCT east – Cedarville	
Chippewa	Rudyard Township	22.291	35.874	M-48 east – Pickford	Southern end of M-48 concurrency
Chippewa	Rudyard	24.964	40.176	M-48 west	Northern end of M-48 concurrency; access to I-75
Chippewa	Rudyard	24.829	39.958	H-40 west	Eastern terminus of H-40
Chippewa	Kinross	29.903– 30.161	48.124– 48.539	I-75 – St. Ignace, Sault Ste. Marie M-80 east – Kinross	Short concurrency at the western terminus of M-80 so the latter can connect to all of the ramps in the I-75 exit 378 interchange
Chippewa	Dafter Township	38.389	61.781	M-28 – Munising, Marquette	
Chippewa	Sault Ste. Marie	44.804	72.105	BS I-75 / LHCT – Sault Ste. Marie	
1.000 mi = 1.609 km; 1.000 km = 0.621 mi: Concurrency terminus
