= M-28–Tahquamenon River Bridge =

- U.S. National Register of Historic Places
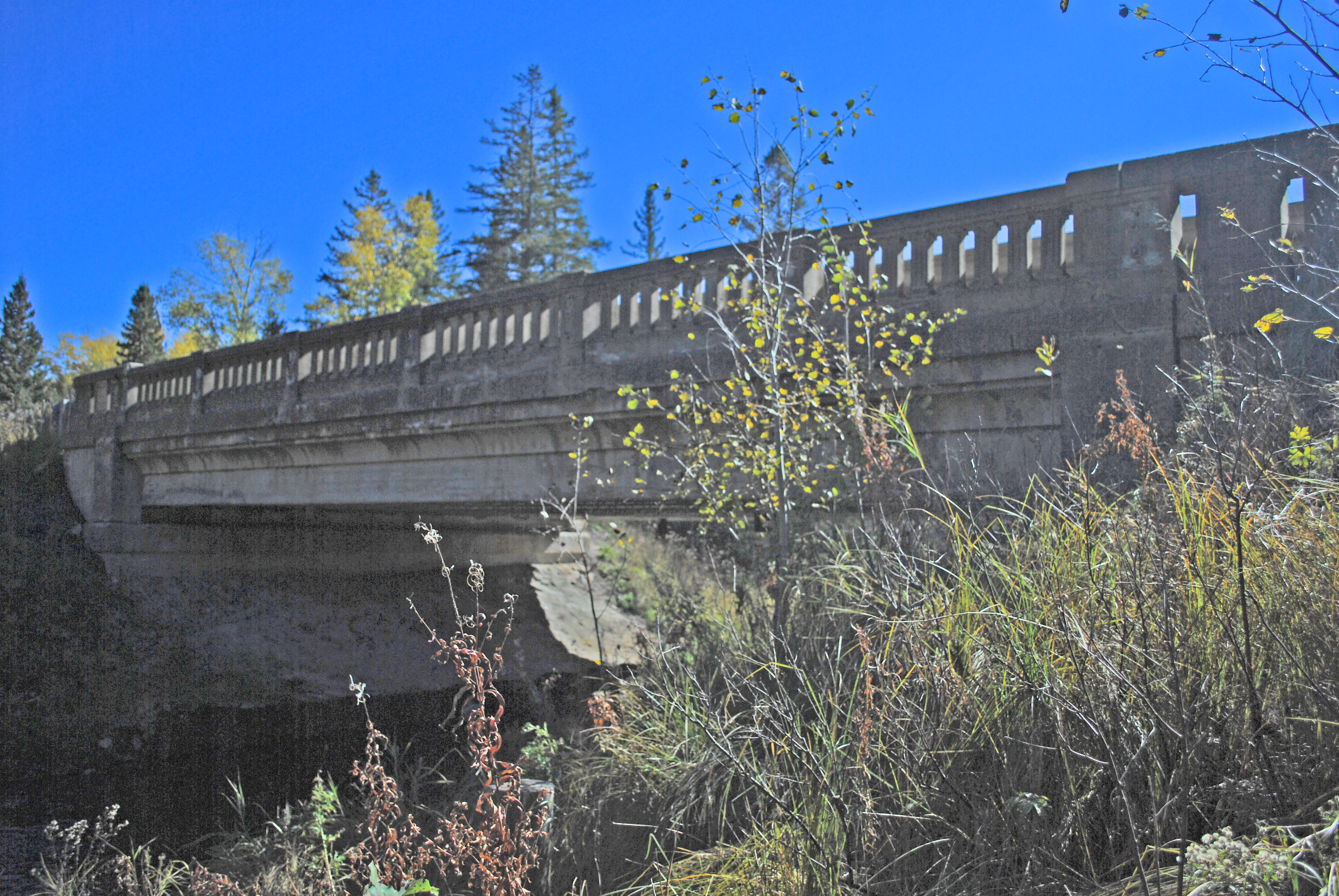

- Location within Michigan Location within the United States
- Interactive map
- Location: M-28 over Tahquamenon River, Chippewa Township, Michigan
- Coordinates: 46°20′46″N 84°57′32″W
- Area: less than one acre
- Built: 1926
- Built by: Walter Toebe & Company
- Architect: Michigan State Highway Department
- Architectural style: steel plate girder bridge
- MPS: Highway Bridges of Michigan MPS
- NRHP reference No.: 99001466
- Added to NRHP: November 30, 1999

The M-28–Tahquamenon River Bridge is a bridge located on M-28 over the Tahquamenon River in Chippewa Township, Michigan. It was listed on the National Register of Historic Places (NRHP) in 1999.

== History ==
In 1926, the Michigan State Highway Department (MSHD) improved M-28, by adding several miles of gravel roads and replacing some bridges, including this one over the Tahquamenon River. The department designed the bridge and solicited bids for its constructions. Walter Toebe and Company of Shingleton was awarded the contract to construct the bridge, and built it in 1926 for a cost of $24,286.08. It was listed on the NRHP on November 30, 1999.

== Historic context ==
The MSHD standardized the designs of steel stringer bridges in 1905–06 and plate girder bridges in 1907–08. However, it was not until 1926, the year this bridge was built, that the department began encasing the steel girder webs in concrete. Why they did so is not entirely clear, and indeed the department abandoned the practice of encasing interior girders soon after. However, they continued encasing the exterior beams in concrete, and continued using the concrete balusters pioneered with this bridge design, and this bridge can be considered a prototype for numerous, similar bridges built by the department in the next decade. The Tahquamenon River Bridge is one of only two remaining bridges of this type in Michigan.

== Description ==
The M-28–Tahquamenon River Bridge is plate girder bridge built of nine steel girders encased in concrete. The girders are braced by concrete diaphragms and sit on large concrete abutments. The bridge spans 55 feet (17 m), and is 35 feet (11 m) wide with a 30-foot-wide (9.1 m) roadway. A concrete deck covered with asphalt sits atop the bridge, and the roadway is lined with concrete guardrails made from fluted balusters and paneled bulkheads.

== Gallery ==
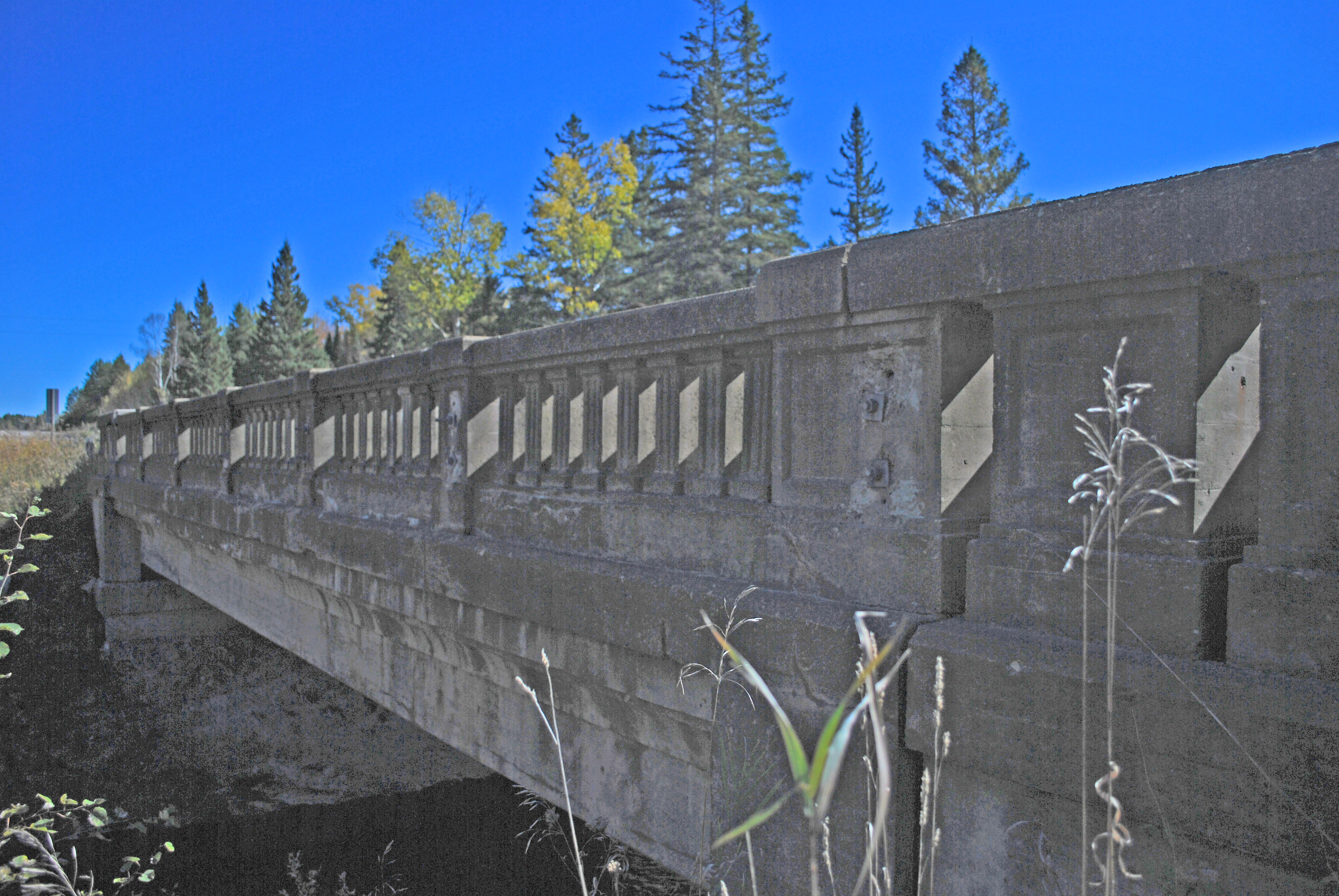
Side stringer

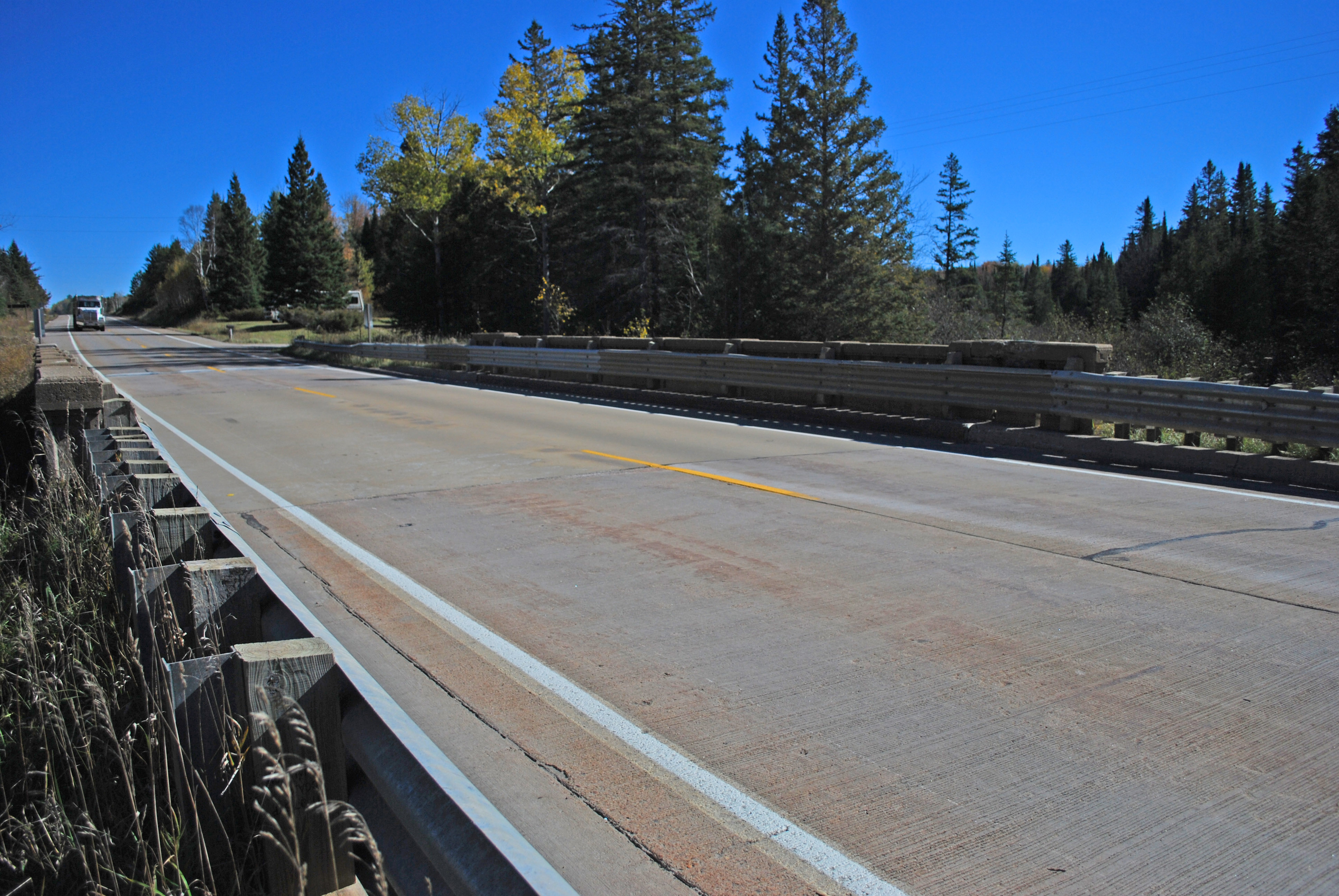
Roadway
