= Interior Township, Michigan =

- Civil township
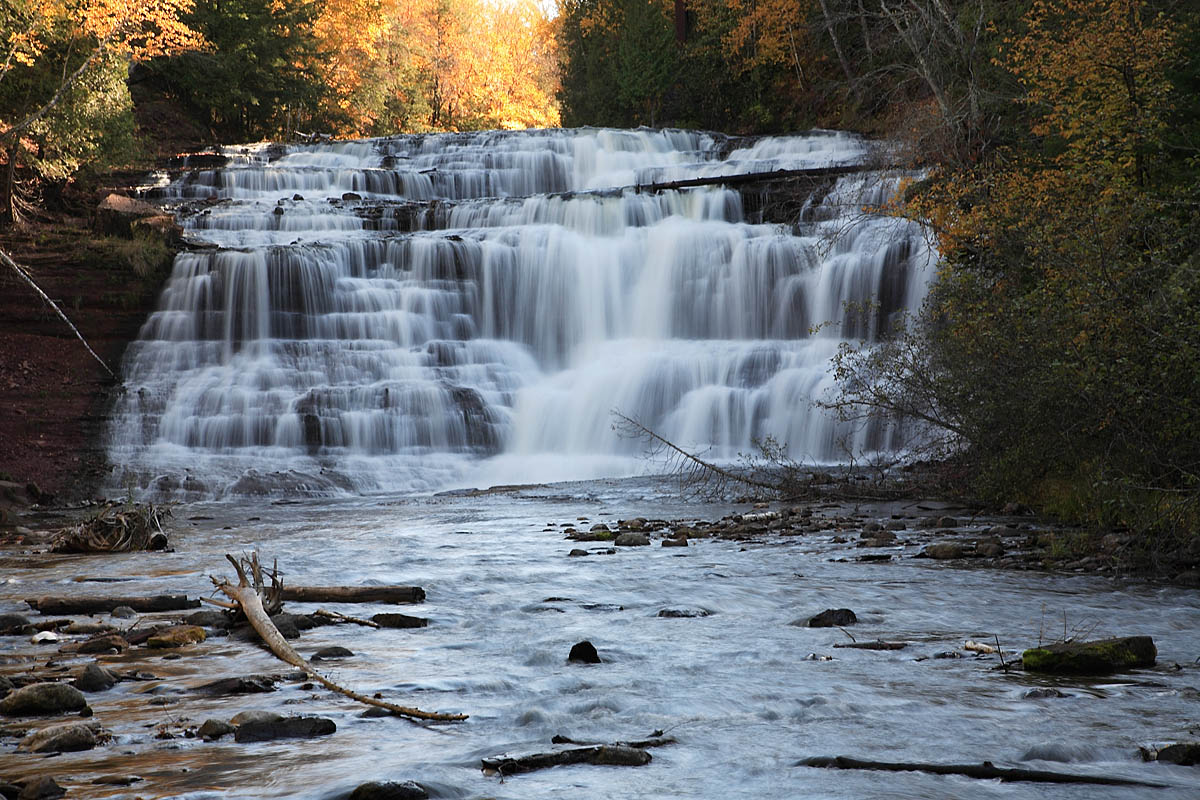
- Agate Falls

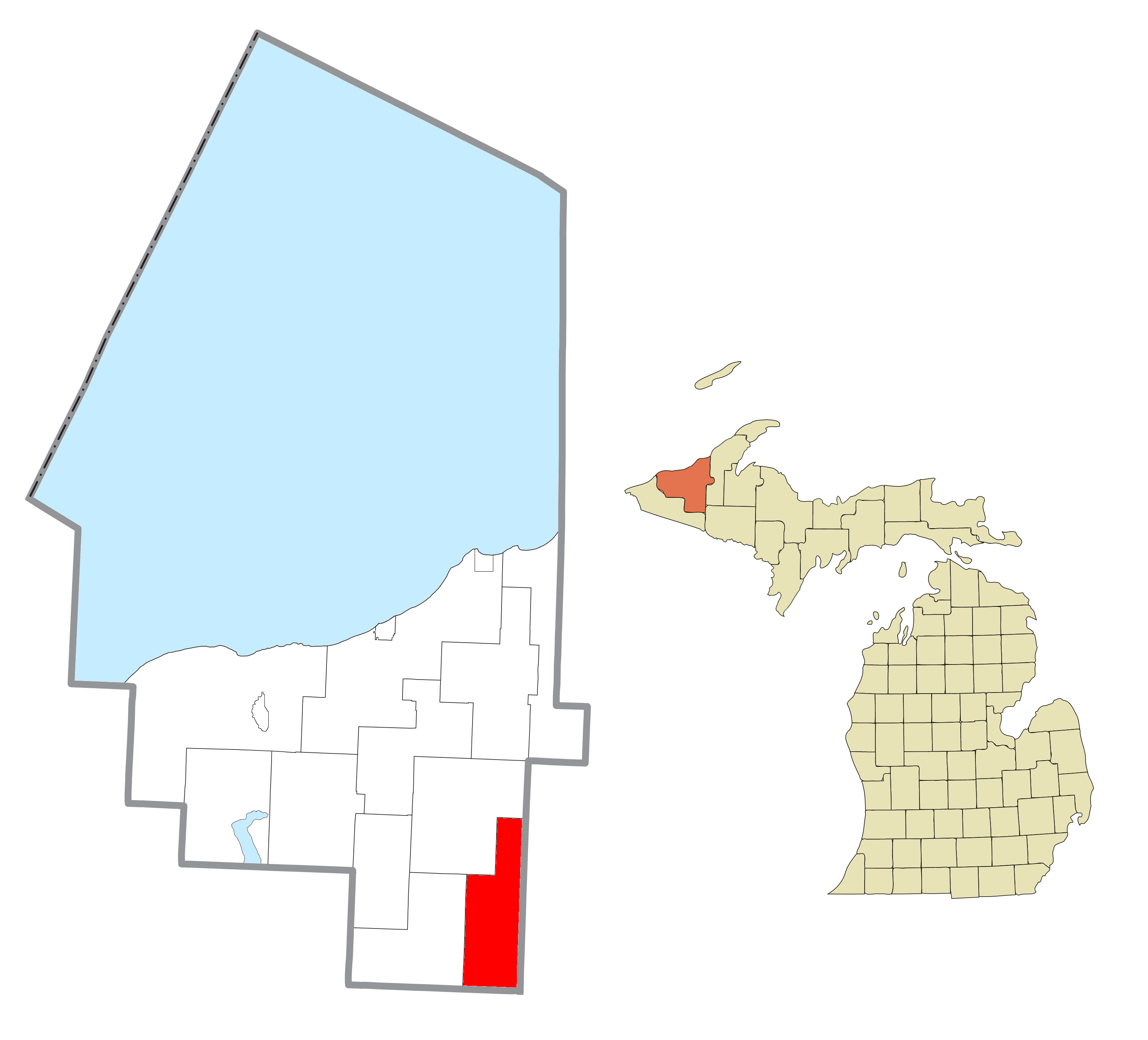
- Location within Ontonagon County

- Location within the state of Michigan Interior Township (the United States)
- Coordinates: 46°25′47″N 89°03′26″W
- Country: United States
- State: Michigan
- County: Ontonagon

Government
  - Supervisor: Andrew Aho
  - Clerk: Mariann Besonen

Area
  - Total: 89.37 sq mi (231.5 km^{2})
  - Land: 86.42 sq mi (223.8 km^{2})
  - Water: 2.95 sq mi (7.6 km^{2})
- Elevation: 1,358 ft (414 m)

Population (2020)
  - Total: 270
  - Density: 3.89/sq mi (1.50/km^{2})
- Time zone: UTC-5 (Eastern (EST))
  - Summer (DST): UTC-4 (EDT)
- ZIP code(s): 49912 (Bruce Crossing); 49967 (Trout Creek); 49969 (Watersmeet)
- Area code: 906
- FIPS code: 26-40760
- GNIS feature ID: 1626518
- Website: https://www.interiortownship.com/

Interior Township is a civil township of Ontonagon County in the U.S. state of Michigan. The population was 270 at the 2020 census. It was named for the Interior Lumber Company.

== Geography ==
According to the United States Census Bureau, the township has a total area of 89.37 square miles (231.47 km^{2}), of which 86.42 square miles (223.83 km^{2}) is land and 2.95 square miles (7.6 km^{2}) (3.30%) is water. A large portion of the township is within the Ottawa National Forest.

=== Communities ===
- Agate is an unincorporated community on M-28, about eight miles east of Bruce Crossing. Agate Falls Scenic Site. on the middle branch of the Ontonagon River is nearby. It was originally known as Agate Siding, after the spur from the Duluth, South Shore and Atlantic Railway (now the Soo Line Railroad) created in about 1890 to serve nearby mining operations. It was named for the agate stone.
- Calderwood was established in the 1880s around a lumbermill. It had a post office beginning in 1908.
- Trout Creek is an unincorporated community on M-28, approximately 11 miles (18 km) east of Bruce Crossing and about five miles west of Kenton. The ZIP Code is 49967. The nearby Trout Creek is a tributary of the Ontonagon River. This was a station on the Duluth, South Shore and Atlantic Railway (now the Soo Line Railroad).

== Notable people ==
- Dick Pole, Major League Baseball pitcher and coach, was born in Trout Creek.
