= Scott Falls =

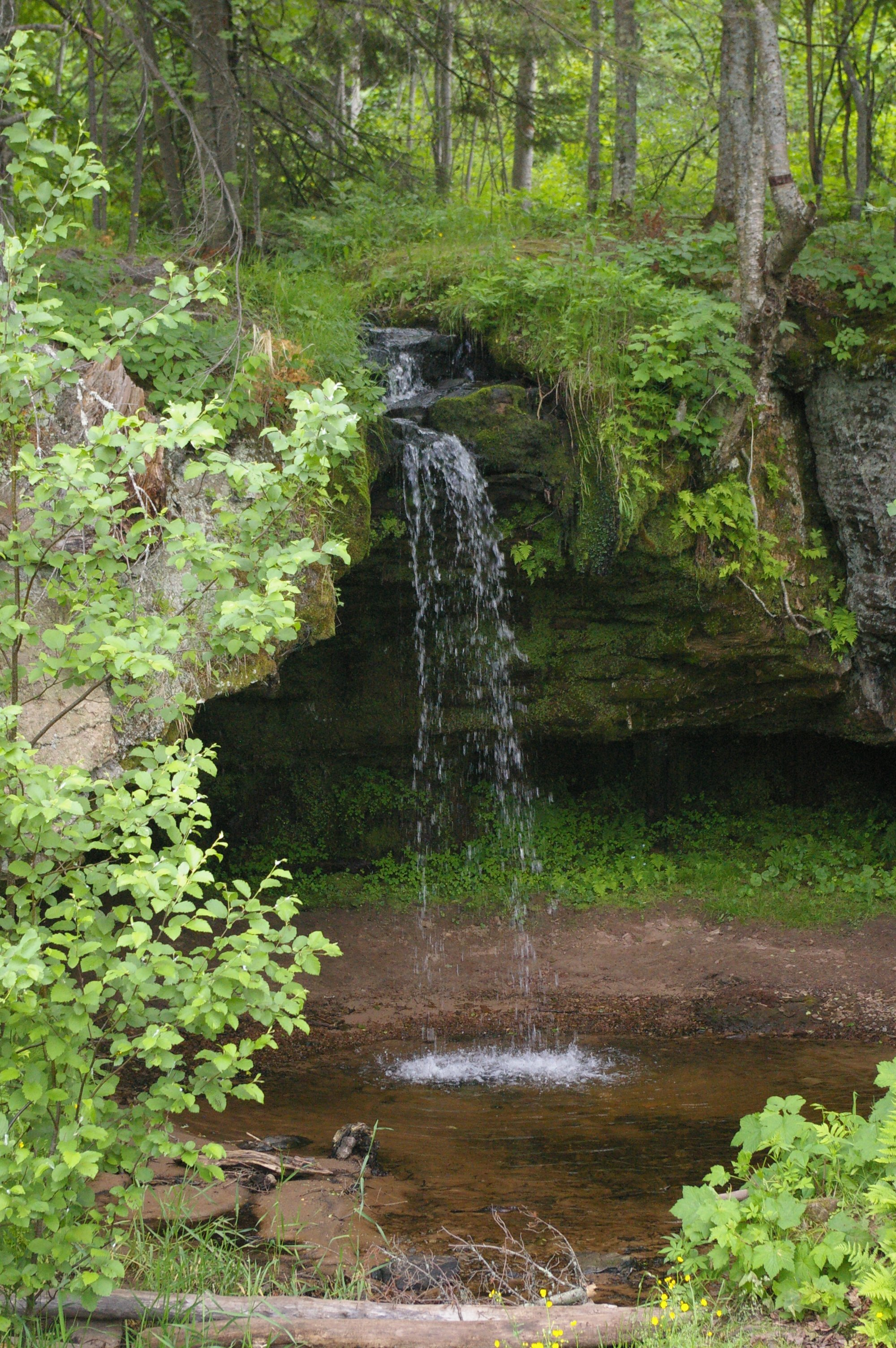
- View of Scott Falls from M-28
- Interactive map of Scott Falls
- Location: Alger County, Michigan
- Coordinates: 46.43°N 86.8°W
- Total height: 10 feet (3.0 m)

Scott Falls is a waterfall located along highway M-28 in Alger County, Michigan near the town of Au Train. The falls drops about 10 feet (3.0 m) over a sandstone cliff into a small pool. The falls can be seen from the highway; they are across the road from the H.J. Rathfoot State Roadside Park.

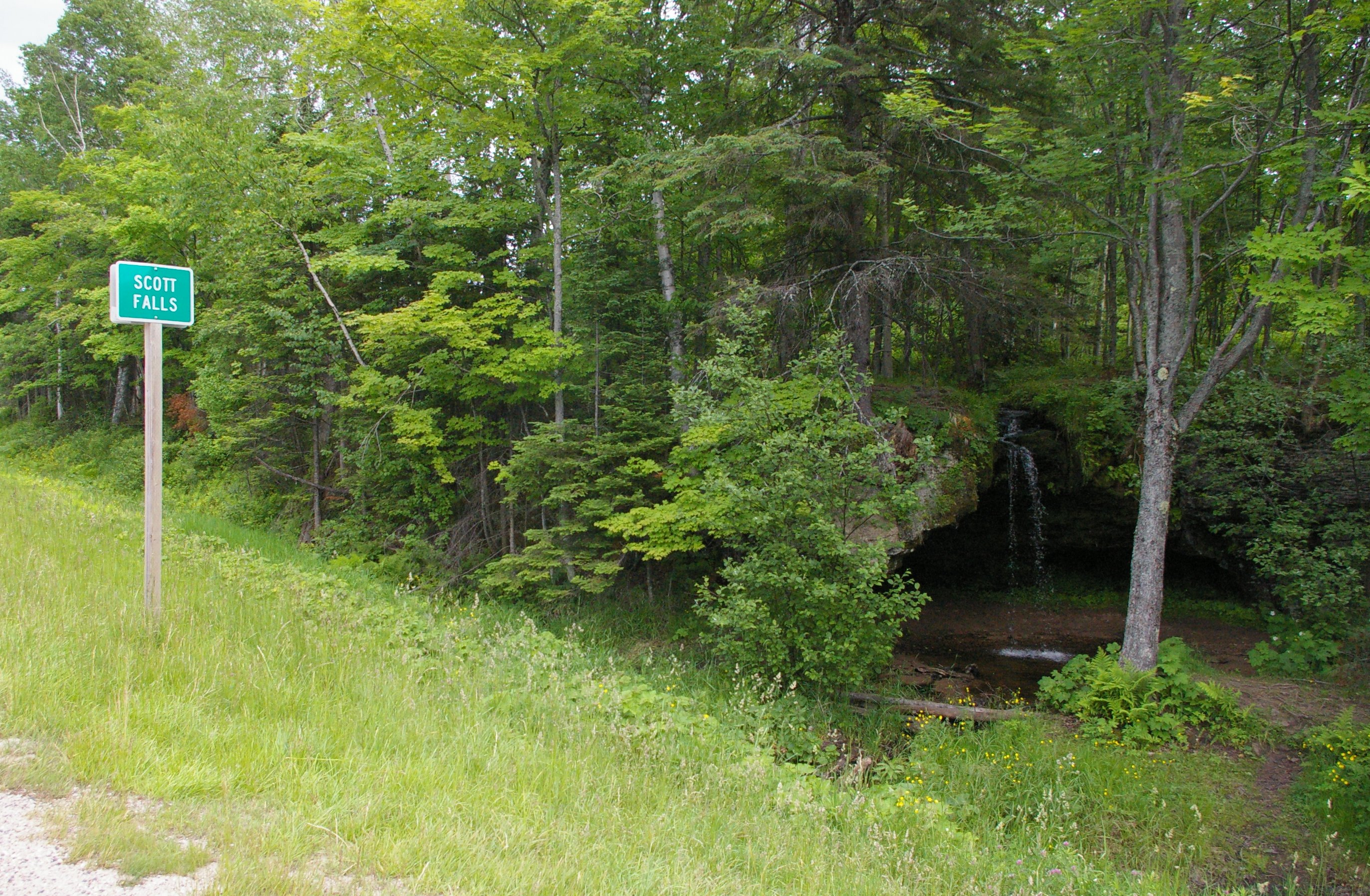
Scott Falls

Scott Falls
