= Chocolay Charter Township, Michigan =

Chocolay Township, Michigan
- Charter township
- Charter Township of Chocolay
- Motto: "Superior Living ... Simply"
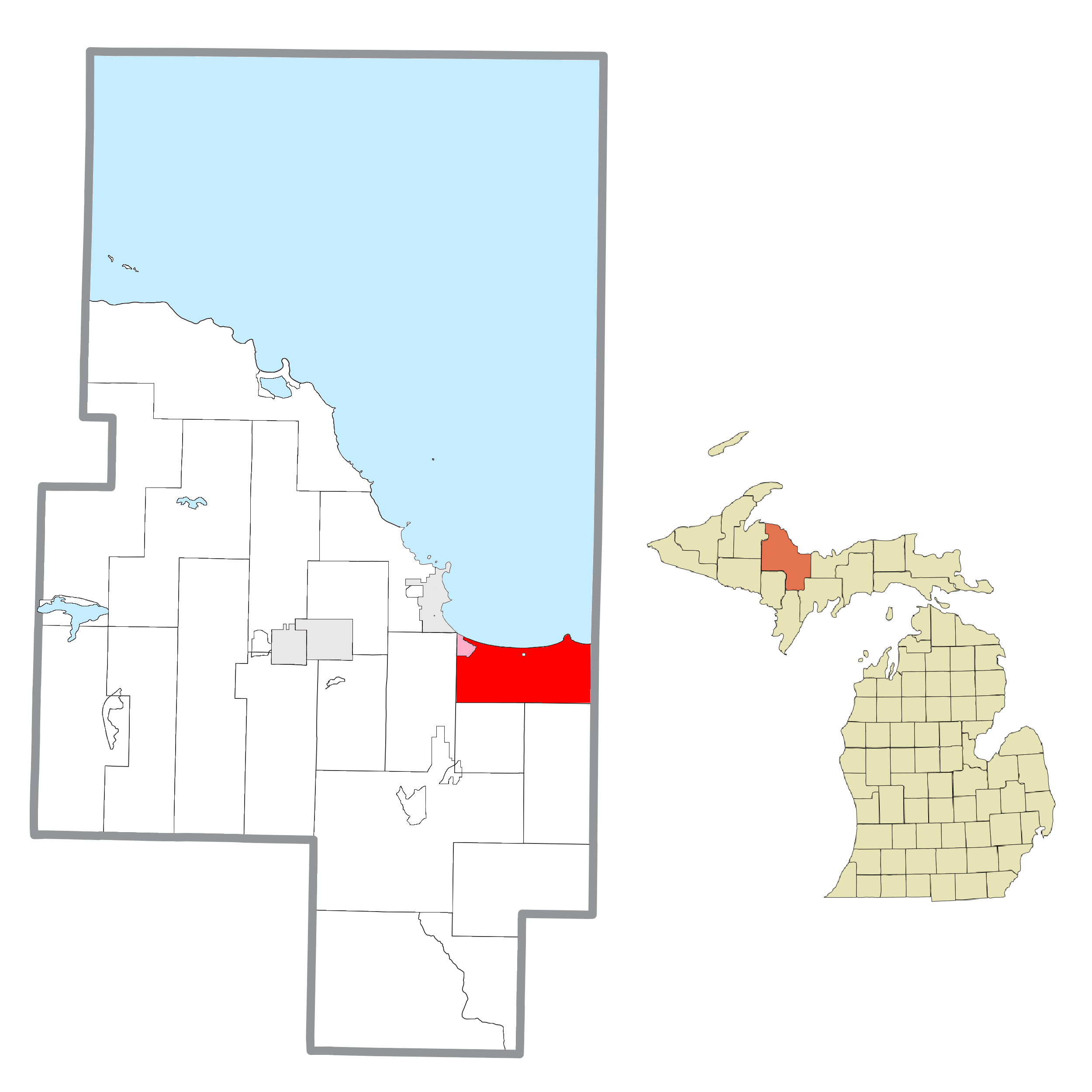
- Location within Marquette County (red) and the administered community of Harvey (pink)

- Location within Michigan Location within the United States
- Coordinates: 46°28′35″N 87°18′44″W
- Country: United States
- State: Michigan
- County: Marquette
- Established: 1860
- Named for: Chocolay River

Government
  - Supervisor: David Lynch
  - Clerk: Max Engle

Area
  - Total: 60.80 sq mi (157.5 km^{2})
  - Land: 58.98 sq mi (152.8 km^{2})
  - Water: 1.82 sq mi (4.7 km^{2})
- Elevation: 653 ft (199 m)

Population (2020)
  - Total: 5,899
  - Density: 100/sq mi (39/km^{2})
- Time zone: UTC-5 (Eastern (EST))
  - Summer (DST): UTC-4 (EDT)
- ZIP Codes: 49855 (Marquette); 49885 (Skandia); 49822 (Deerton)
- Area code: 906
- FIPS code: 26-103-15660
- GNIS feature ID: 1626081
- Website: chocolay.gov

Chocolay Township (/ˈtʃɒkəleɪ/ CHOK-ə-lay) is a charter township in Marquette County in the U.S. state of Michigan. The population was 5,899 at the 2020 census. The township is named for the Chocolay River and is located on the shore of Lake Superior.

== Geography ==
The township is in eastern Marquette County. It is bordered to the northwest by the city of Marquette, the county seat; to the west by Sands Township; to the south by West Branch and Skandia townships; to the east by Onota Township in Alger County; and to the north by Lake Superior.

According to the United States Census Bureau, the township has a total area of 60.80 square miles (157.47 km^{2}), of which 58.98 square miles (152.76 km^{2}) are land and 1.82 square miles (4.71 km^{2}) (2.99%) are water.

== Communities ==
- Beaver Grove is an unincorporated community at 46°28′53″N 87°18′54″W.
- Gordon is an unincorporated community at 46°29′04″N 87°13′39″W.
- Green Garden is an unincorporated community at 46°26′17″N 87°16′49″W.
- Harvey is an unincorporated community and census-designated place at 46°29′18″N 87°21′05″W.
- Lakewood is an unincorporated community at 46°29′48″N 87°20′44″W.
- Sand River is an unincorporated community at 46°29′24″N 87°06′59″W.

== Demographics ==
Historical population
Census	Pop.	Note	%±
1870	260		—
1880	974		274.6%
1890	1,285		31.9%
1900	662		−48.5%
1910	852		28.7%
1920	735		−13.7%
1930	636		−13.5%
1940	882		38.7%
1950	1,205		36.6%
1960	2,235		85.5%
1970	3,299		47.6%
1980	5,685		72.3%
1990	6,025		6.0%
2000	7,148		18.6%
2010	5,903		−17.4%
2020	5,899		−0.1%
U.S. Decennial Census

At the 2000 census, there were 7,148 people, 2,324 households and 1,743 families residing in the township. The population density was 119.8 inhabitants per square mile (46.3/km^{2}). There were 2,643 housing units at an average density of 44.3 per square mile (17.1/km^{2}). The racial makeup, based on self-reporting, was 86.64% White, 8.66% African American, 2.01% Native American, 0.57% Asian, 0.07% Pacific Islander, 0.29% from other races, and 1.75% from two or more races. Hispanic or Latino of any race were 0.80% of the population. Based on self-reporting in Census 2000, 12.7% were of Finnish, 11.1% German, 10.5% French, 8.6% English, 7.6% Irish, 5.6% Swedish and 5.1% Italian ancestry.

There were 2,324 households, of which 35.8% had children under the age of 18 living with them, 63.6% were married couples living together, 7.4% had a female householder with no husband present, and 25.0% were non-families. 21.0% of all households were made up of individuals, and 6.0% had someone living alone who was 65 years of age or older. The average household size was 2.60 and the average family size was 3.00.

22.0% of the population were under the age of 18, 8.2% from 18 to 24, 34.0% from 25 to 44, 27.8% from 45 to 64, and 8.1% who were 65 years of age or older. The median age was 38 years. For every 100 females, there were 139.0 males. For every 100 females age 18 and over, there were 150.5 males.

The median household income was $49,438 and the median family income was $55,972. Males had a median income of $39,282 and females $27,500. The per capita income was $19,569. About 3.0% of families and 4.9% of the population were below the poverty line, including 5.0% of those under age 18 and 1.1% of those age 65 or over.
