= Horseshoe Bay Wilderness =

Wilderness area in the U.S. state of Michigan

- IUCN category Ib (wilderness area)
- Location within the United States
- Location: Mackinac County, Michigan, United States
- Nearest city: St. Ignace, Michigan
- Coordinates: 45°58′30″N 84°43′07″W
- Area: 3,787 acres (15.33 km^{2})
- Established: 1987
- Governing body: U.S. Forest Service

The Horseshoe Bay Wilderness is a 3,787-acre (15.33 km^{2}) wilderness area in the U.S. state of Michigan. It borders Horseshoe Bay, a shallow bay that is part of the extreme northwest corner of Lake Huron adjacent to the Straits of Mackinac. The wilderness area is overseen by the United States Forest Service as part of the Hiawatha National Forest.

== Description ==
When the water level of Lake Huron receded after the most recent ice age, many rolling areas of former lakeshore and lake bottomland became riparian wetlands along the lake's edge. The Horseshoe Bay Wilderness is one of these wetlands. It is forested, and characterized by trees that can tolerate humid and damp conditions, such as the paper birch and the Northern whitecedar. The shore of Horseshoe Bay, and the slow-moving tributaries that drain from the wetland into the bay, offer good ground for fish spawning, and the adjacent area of Lake Huron is rich in fish of all kinds. Fish-eating waterfowl, such as the great blue heron, are often seen here.

Native Americans used Horseshoe Bay wetlands to catch fish. They harvested local plant life, such as birch bark and cedar roots, to build the canoes that they used to catch the fish.

After the Horseshoe Bay wetland had been thoroughly logged by timber companies, the land reverted to the public sector. Congress designated a parcel of national forest land along Horseshoe Bay's shoreline as a wilderness area in 1987. The Forest Service has built a 2.5-mile (4.0 km) trail from the Foley Creek parking lot/campground, adjacent to the wilderness, into the wilderness itself. The trail is often damp, and mosquitoes are common; it terminates at the Horseshoe Bay shoreline.

The Horseshoe Bay Wilderness is served by County Highway H-63 and is adjacent to exit 352 on Interstate 75. The nearest major municipality is St. Ignace, which is five miles (8.0 km)to the south.
