= Mackinac Trail =

Mackinac Trail, or Mackinaw Trail is the name for two related, but separate, roadways in the US state of Michigan.

- In the Upper Peninsula:
  - US 2, previous designation of H-63, before the construction of the I-75 freeway
  - H-63, the entire road between St. Ignace and Sault Ste. Marie
- In the Lower Peninsula:
  - US 31, between Petoskey and I-75 south of Mackinaw City
  - Old US 131, between Reed City and Petoskey.
