= Negaunee Township, Michigan =

- Civil township
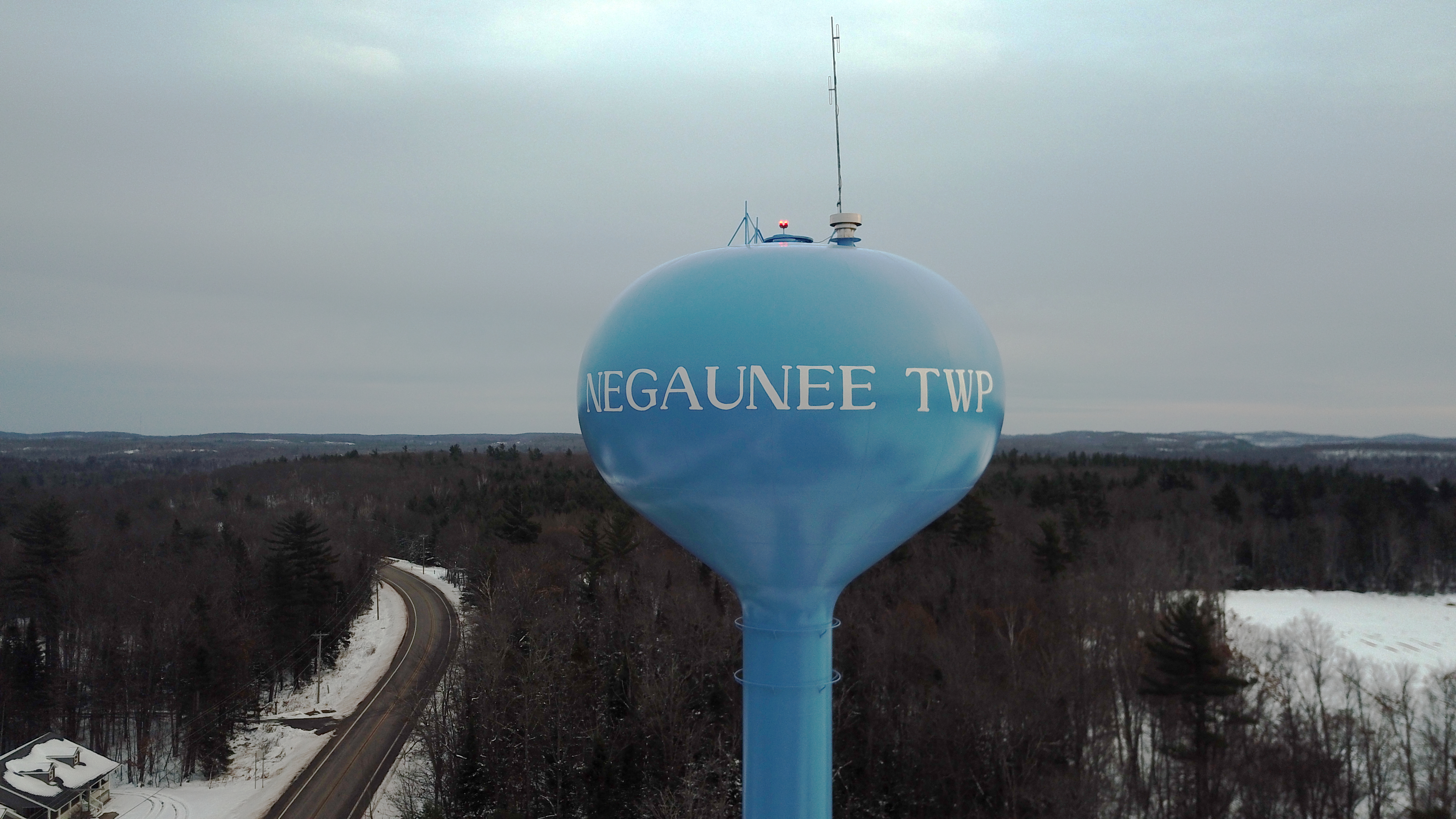
- Negaunee Township water tower

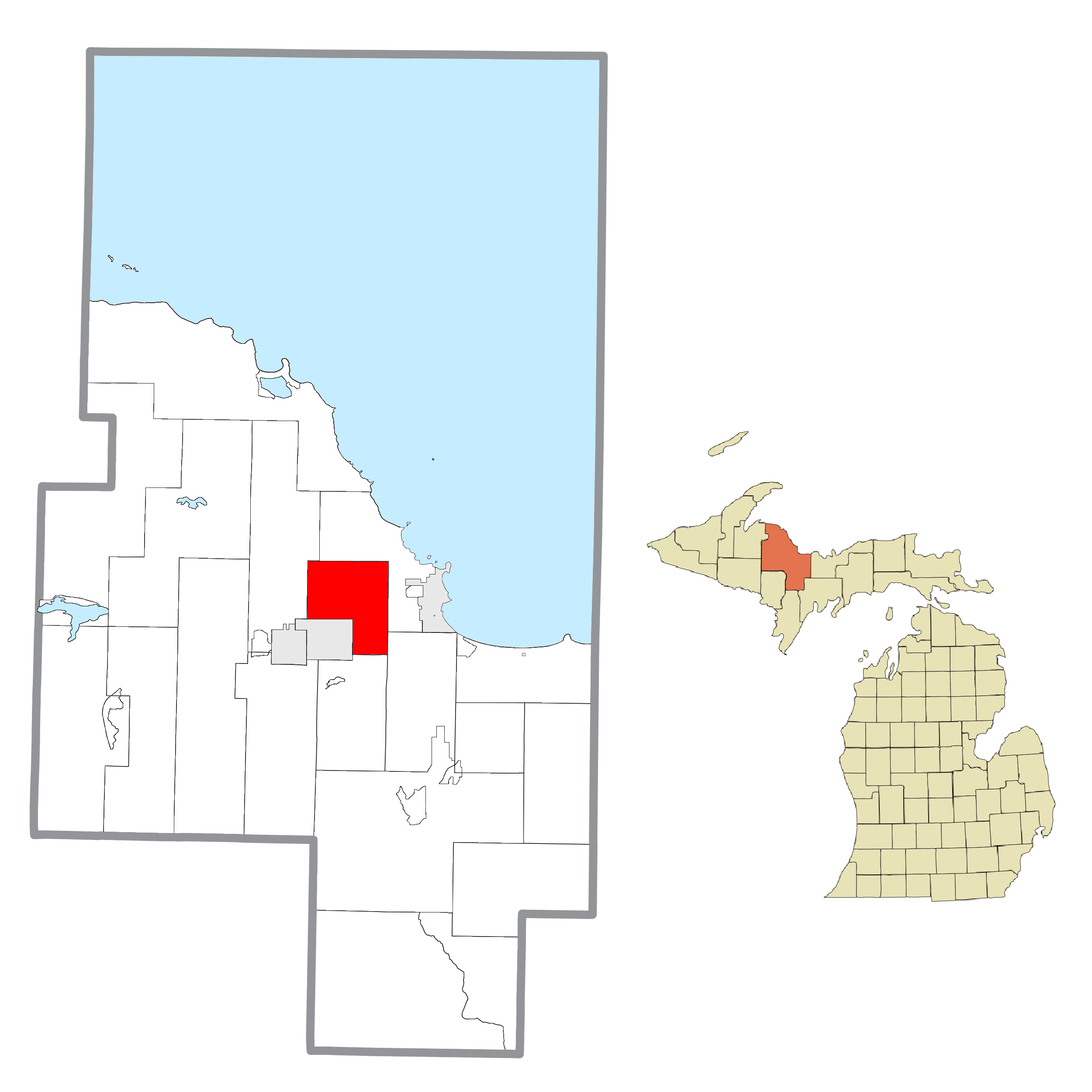
- Location within Marquette County

- Location within Michigan Location within the United States
- Coordinates: 46°31′51″N 87°32′49″W
- Country: United States
- State: Michigan
- County: Marquette

Government
  - Supervisor: Gary Wommer
  - Clerk: Rachel Sertich

Area
  - Total: 43.66 sq mi (113.1 km^{2})
  - Land: 42.08 sq mi (109.0 km^{2})
  - Water: 1.58 sq mi (4.1 km^{2})
- Elevation: 1,417 ft (432 m)

Population (2020)
  - Total: 3,232
  - Density: 76.8/sq mi (29.7/km^{2})
- Time zone: UTC-5 (Eastern (EST))
  - Summer (DST): UTC-4 (EDT)
- ZIP Codes: 49866 (Negaunee); 49855 (Marquette); 49849 (Ishpeming)
- Area code: 906
- FIPS code: 26-103-56880
- GNIS feature ID: 1626791
- Website: www.negauneetownship.org

Negaunee Township is a civil township of Marquette County in the U.S. state of Michigan. The population was 3,232 at the 2020 census. The city of Negaunee is located at the southwest corner of the township, but the two are administered autonomously.

== Communities ==
- Eagle Mills A railroad station was established at this site in the township in 1855. A sawmill was established here in 1873 and a post office began in 1877. It operated periodically through 1912.

== Geography ==
According to the United States Census Bureau, the township has a total area of 43.66 square miles (113.08 km^{2}), of which 42.08 square miles (108.99 km^{2}) are land and 1.58 square miles (4.09 km^{2}) (3.62%) are water.

=== Climate ===
Marquette WFO is a weather station located 8 miles (12.9 km) west of the city Negaunee, near the Eagle Mills train station.

Climate data for Marquette WFO, Michigan, 1991–2020 normals, 1959-2020 extremes: 1411ft (430m)
Month	Jan	Feb	Mar	Apr	May	Jun	Jul	Aug	Sep	Oct	Nov	Dec	Year
Record high °F (°C)	53 (12)	61 (16)	81 (27)	92 (33)	95 (35)	99 (37)	99 (37)	96 (36)	93 (34)	87 (31)	75 (24)	59 (15)	99 (37)
Mean maximum °F (°C)	38.7 (3.7)	44.6 (7.0)	56.8 (13.8)	71.3 (21.8)	84.3 (29.1)	88.7 (31.5)	89.1 (31.7)	88.2 (31.2)	83.7 (28.7)	75.2 (24.0)	56.1 (13.4)	43.3 (6.3)	91.6 (33.1)
Mean daily maximum °F (°C)	21.5 (−5.8)	24.9 (−3.9)	34.9 (1.6)	46.5 (8.1)	61.7 (16.5)	71.8 (22.1)	76.0 (24.4)	74.2 (23.4)	66.3 (19.1)	51.7 (10.9)	37.4 (3.0)	26.6 (−3.0)	49.5 (9.7)
Daily mean °F (°C)	14.3 (−9.8)	15.8 (−9.0)	25.0 (−3.9)	36.8 (2.7)	50.6 (10.3)	60.7 (15.9)	65.3 (18.5)	63.6 (17.6)	56.3 (13.5)	43.5 (6.4)	30.8 (−0.7)	20.2 (−6.6)	40.2 (4.6)
Mean daily minimum °F (°C)	7.2 (−13.8)	6.8 (−14.0)	15.1 (−9.4)	27.1 (−2.7)	39.6 (4.2)	49.7 (9.8)	54.5 (12.5)	53.1 (11.7)	46.3 (7.9)	35.2 (1.8)	24.2 (−4.3)	13.9 (−10.1)	31.1 (−0.5)
Mean minimum °F (°C)	−14.4 (−25.8)	−16.7 (−27.1)	−10.8 (−23.8)	9.0 (−12.8)	25.8 (−3.4)	35.1 (1.7)	42.3 (5.7)	39.8 (4.3)	31.2 (−0.4)	22.1 (−5.5)	6.8 (−14.0)	−7.7 (−22.1)	−19.8 (−28.8)
Record low °F (°C)	−32 (−36)	−34 (−37)	−30 (−34)	−9 (−23)	17 (−8)	25 (−4)	34 (1)	31 (−1)	21 (−6)	9 (−13)	−13 (−25)	−28 (−33)	−34 (−37)
Average precipitation inches (mm)	2.33 (59)	2.24 (57)	2.67 (68)	3.35 (85)	3.37 (86)	3.27 (83)	3.10 (79)	2.85 (72)	3.96 (101)	4.04 (103)	2.90 (74)	2.60 (66)	36.68 (933)
Average snowfall inches (cm)	42.10 (106.9)	36.80 (93.5)	29.40 (74.7)	17.60 (44.7)	1.40 (3.6)	0.00 (0.00)	0.00 (0.00)	0.00 (0.00)	0.10 (0.25)	5.30 (13.5)	24.20 (61.5)	39.90 (101.3)	196.8 (499.95)
Source 1: NOAA
Source 2: XMACIS (records & monthly max/mins)

== Demographics ==
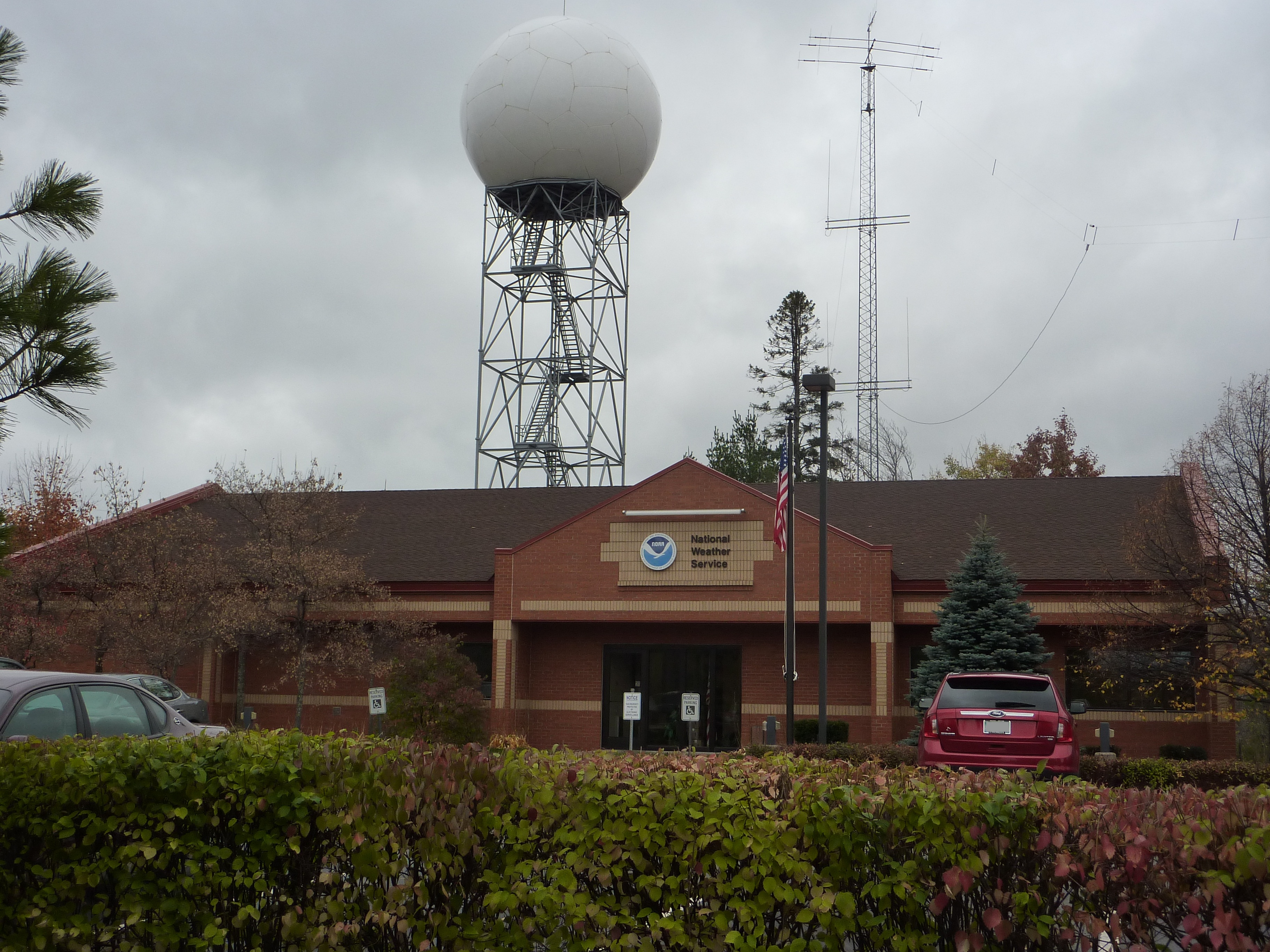
National Weather Service Marquette office situated in the township near the former Marquette County Airport

As of the census of 2000, there were 2,707 people, 1,031 households, and 795 families residing in the township. The population density was 64.4 inhabitants per square mile (24.9/km^{2}). There were 1,259 housing units at an average density of 29.9 per square mile (11.5/km^{2}). The racial makeup of the township was 97.56% White, 0.07% African American, 0.92% Native American, 0.18% Asian, 0.04% Pacific Islander, 0.18% from other races, and 1.03% from two or more races. Hispanic or Latino of any race were 0.48% of the population.

There were 1,031 households, out of which 34.9% had children under the age of 18 living with them, 67.7% were married couples living together, 6.0% had a female householder with no husband present, and 22.8% were non-families. 19.0% of all households were made up of individuals, and 5.8% had someone living alone who was 65 years of age or older. The average household size was 2.63 and the average family size was 3.02.

In the township the population was spread out, with 24.8% under the age of 18, 8.0% from 18 to 24, 30.1% from 25 to 44, 28.4% from 45 to 64, and 8.7% who were 65 years of age or older. The median age was 38 years. For every 100 females, there were 103.8 males. For every 100 females age 18 and over, there were 103.0 males.

The median income for a household in the township was $47,348, and the median income for a family was $55,283. Males had a median income of $40,132 versus $25,568 for females. The per capita income for the township was $18,894. About 1.8% of families and 3.7% of the population were below the poverty line, including 2.2% of those under age 18 and 4.9% of those age 65 or over.

== Highways ==
- US 41 / M-28
- M-35
