= Chocolay River =

Coordinates: 46°30′04″N 87°21′30″W

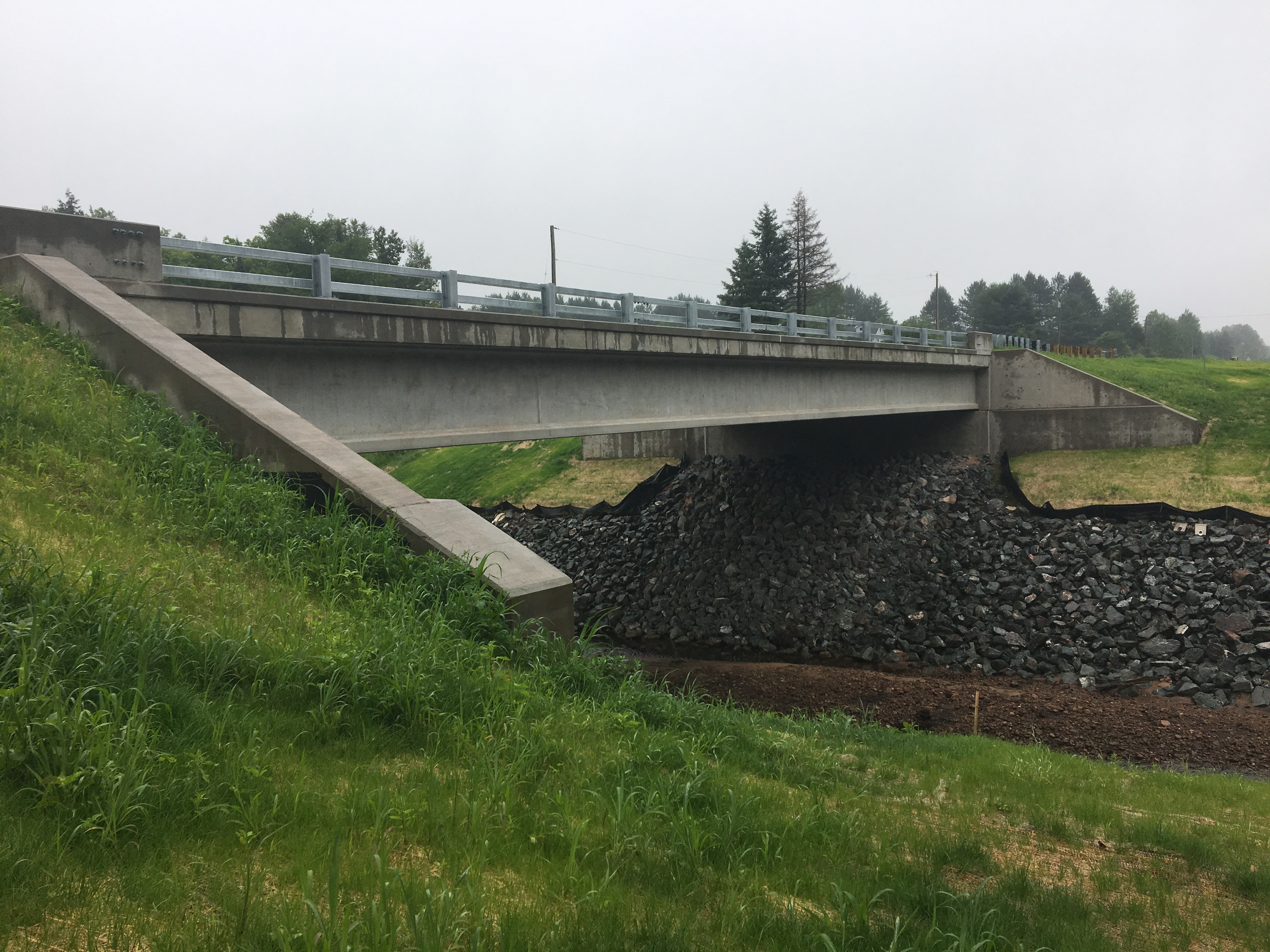
- A bridge spanning the river

Location
- Country: United States

Physical characteristics
- Source
  - location: Michigan

The Chocolay River (/ˈtʃɒkəleɪ/ CHAH-kə-lay) is a 21.7-mile-long (34.9 km) tributary of Lake Superior in Marquette County on the Upper Peninsula of Michigan in the United States. It forms at the confluence of its West and East Branches west of Skandia and flows generally north, then west, to Lake Superior at the village of Harvey, 3 miles (5 km) southeast of the city of Marquette.

== See also ==
- List of rivers of Michigan
