= National Register of Historic Places listings in Alger County, Michigan =

Location of Alger County in Michigan

This is a list of the National Register of Historic Places listings in Alger County, Michigan.

This is intended to be a complete list of the properties and districts on the National Register of Historic Places in Alger County, Michigan, United States. Latitude and longitude coordinates are provided for many National Register properties and districts; these locations may be seen together in a map.

There are 16 properties and districts listed on the National Register in the county.

This National Park Service list is complete through NPS recent listings posted September 26, 2025.

== Current listings ==
	Name on the Register	Image	Date listed	Location	City or town	Description
1	Au Sable Light Station	Au Sable Light Station	May 23, 1978 (#78000374)	West of Grand Marais; 46°40′22″N 86°08′21″W	Grand Marais	The Au Sable Light Station was built in 1874 on Au Sable Point. The tower is a white brick conical tower with a black lantern; a red brick lightkeeper's house stands next door. Both were designed by Colonel Orlando Metcalfe Poe. The lighthouse was automated in 1958.
2	Bar Lake Site		June 27, 2014 (#14000366)	Near Bar Lake; 46°14′16″N 86°38′55″W	Munising Township	An archaeological site which is part of the Woodland Period Archaeological Sites of the Indian River and Fishdam River Basins MPS.
3	Bay Furnace	Bay Furnace	September 30, 1971 (#71000382)	Northwest of Christmas off M-28 in Hiawatha National Forest; 46°26′27″N 86°42′21″W	Au Train Township	Bay Furnace was a blast furnace used for smelting iron. The furnace was constructed in 1869-70, and by 1874 was producing 15 tons of pig iron daily. A surrounding town, Onota, sprang up, and was soon home to 500 people. A disastrous fire in 1879 destroyed both the furnace and town; neither were rebuilt. The remains of the furnace were partially reconstructed later, and the site is now a campground.
4	Grand Island Harbor Rear Range Light	Grand Island Harbor Rear Range Light	June 26, 1990 (#90000906)	M-28 west of Powell Pt. 46°26′12″N 86°41′28″W	Munising Township	The Grand Island Range Lights were lit first in 1868, but by 1914 were in poor repair. The new rear range light was a 64-foot (20 m) tower, the upper half (painted white) of which was part of a tower originally located at the Vidal Shoals near Sault Ste. Marie. The front range light was replaced again in 1968, but both lights were deactivated in 1969.
5	Grand Island North Light Station	Grand Island North Light Station	September 12, 1985 (#85002149)	Grand Island; 46°33′32″N 86°40′49″W	Grand Island near Munising	Built in 1867 on a 175-foot tall cliff, the Grand Island North Light Station was the second lighthouse constructed at this site. The lighthouse was manned until 1941, and finally decommissioned in 1961. It is currently a privately owned summer home.
6	Grand Marais Harbor of Refuge Inner and Outer Lights	Grand Marais Harbor of Refuge Inner and Outer Lights	May 2, 2012 (#12000254)	West pier at entry to Grand Marais Harbor of Refuge; 46°41′02″N 85°58′20″W	Burt Township	The Army Corps of Engineers began upgrading the harbor at Grand Marais in 1881, building a timber pile breakwater and two piers demarcating the entry into the harbor. Realizing that an added light would improve navigation, the Lighthouse Board requested funding for a light at the pierhead. This outer light was constructed in 1895; an inner light was added in 1898. Both are prefabricated skeletal iron or steel structures painted white and bolted to the pier. These lights are part of the Light Stations of the United States Multiple Property Submission.
7	Hartney Terrace Site		June 27, 2014 (#14000367)	Near Hartney Lake; 46°15′51″N 86°40′23″W	Munising Township	An archaeological site which is part of the Woodland Period Archaeological Sites of the Indian River and Fishdam River Basins MPS.
8	King Road – Whitefish River Bridge	King Road – Whitefish River Bridge	November 30, 1999 (#99001463)	King Rd. over Whitefish River; 46°15′49″N 87°05′34″W	Limestone Township	This bridge, completed in 1919, was the last link in the Alger County trunk line road running from Trenary to Skandia. In 1919, the Michigan State Highway Department engineers designed what was designated as Trunk Line Bridge Number 264, based on a standard girder bridge design that the agency had developed in 1913–14.
9	Lobb House	Lobb House	October 8, 1976 (#76001023)	203 W. Onota St. 46°24′38″N 86°39′26″W	Munising	Edward and Elizabeth Lobb owned the prosperous Princeton Mine in Marquette County and the Anna River Brick Company, founded in 1887. Edward Lobb died c. 1892, leaving the family's fortune to Elizabeth. She continued operating the brickyard along with her son Nathaniel, and in 1905-1906 built this house designed by Sault Ste. Marie architect Edward DeMar.
10	M-28 – Sand River Bridge	M-28 – Sand River Bridge	November 30, 1999 (#99001460)	M-28 over Sand River; 46°29′42″N 87°06′27″W	Onota Township	The bridge carrying M-28 over the Sand River is a medium-span concrete bridge with a shallow arch span, 4 feet thick at the abutments and 1'-8" at the center. The bridge has a so-called rigid-frame construction, which was a new development by the highway department at the time the bridge was built.
11	M-94 (old) – Au Train River Bridge	M-94 (old) – Au Train River Bridge	November 30, 1999 (#99001462)	Wolkoff Rd. over Au Train River; 46°26′00″N 86°49′27″W	Au Train Township	This bridge, now closed to vehicular traffic, carries what is now Wolkoff Road over the Au Train River. It is one of only two remaining bridges built to a 1907-1908 Michigan State Highway Department design standard for steel plate through girder bridges intended for mid-size spans of 30 to 60 feet.
12	Mikulich General Store	Mikulich General Store	July 15, 1993 (#93000428)	Junction of County Routes 1 and 44, Limestone Township; 46°15′38″N 86°58′10″W	Traunik	The Mikulich General Store is a two-story rectangular building with a flat roof. The store was operated by the Mikulich family from 1926 to 1887, and served as the social and economic center for the Slovenian community of Traunik.
13	Paulson House	Paulson House	November 9, 1972 (#72000590)	South of AuTrain on USFS Rd. 2278 in Hiawatha National Forest; 46°24′25″N 86°51′01″W	Au Train	The Paulson Hose is a cedar log structure built in 1883 by Swedish immigrant Charles Paulson. The upper floor of the cabin was used as a school room in the early part of the 20th century. Paulson and his wife lived in the cabin until their deaths in 1925.
14	Pickle Barrel House	Pickle Barrel House	February 4, 2004 (#03001548)	Northeastern corner of Lake Ave. and Randolph St. 46°40′16″N 85°59′05″W	Burt Township	The Pickle Barrel House is a two-story cabin built of two barrels. The house design is based on cartoon characters, the Teenie Weenies, created by William Donahey. The barrel house was created as a large-scale version of the miniature oak casks used for Monarch-brand pickles, a food line that Donahey did advertisements for.
15	Schoolcraft Furnace Site	Schoolcraft Furnace Site	December 28, 1977 (#77000151)	Northeast of Munising off M-94; 46°25′26″N 86°37′21″W	Munising	The Schoolcraft Furnace Site is an abandoned iron furnace. Construction began on the furnace in 1867, and by 1869 it was putting out 20 tons if pig iron daily. However, material shortages, poor management, and a depression in iron prices caused operations to be erratic. After several restarts, the furnace closed for good in 1878.
16	Widewaters Site		June 27, 2014 (#14000368)	Indian River near Bar Lake; 46°14′00″N 86°38′20″W	Munising Township	An archaeological site which is part of the Woodland Period Archaeological Sites of the Indian River and Fishdam River Basins MPS.

== Former listing ==
	Name on the Register	Image	Date listed	Date removed	Location	City or town	Description
1	Hill's Store	Hill's Store	April 16, 1971 (#73002200)	March 5, 1973	Grand Marais Ave. 46°40′15″N 85°59′02″W	Grand Marais, Michigan	Demolished

== See also ==
- List of National Historic Landmarks in Michigan
- National Register of Historic Places listings in Michigan
- Listings in neighboring counties: Delta, Luce, Marquette, Schoolcraft
- List of Michigan State Historic Sites in Alger County, Michigan
