= List of Michigan State Historic Sites in Alger County =

Location of Alger County in Michigan

The following is a list of Michigan State Historic Sites in Alger County, Michigan. Sites marked with a dagger (†) are also listed on the National Register of Historic Places in Alger County, Michigan.

== Current listings ==
Name	Image	Location	City	Listing date
Alger County Courthouse (Demolished)		Elm Street	Munising	December 14, 1976
American Fur Company Log Cabin No. 3		Elm and Varnum Streets	Munising	February 23, 1981
Au Sable Light Station†		Au Sable Point, 7 miles (11 km) west of Grand Marais	Burt Township	September 21, 1976
Bay Furnace†		Northwest of Christmas off M-28 in Hiawatha National Forest (Sec 29, T47N, R19W)	Christmas	January 22, 1971
Bird-Olivier House		Everett Avenue and Emma Street	Grand Marais	April 24, 1981
Burt and Gamble Railway Grade		2.5 miles (4.0 km) east of Grand Marais	Grand Marais	November 3, 1976
Curtis and Miller Cook Sawmill		East Everett Road (H-58)	Grand Marais	February 16, 1989
First National Bank and Post Office	First National Bank-Munising	100 West Munising Avenue	Munising	February 27, 1980
Grand Island		Munising Bay, Lake Superior	Munising	February 12, 1959
Grand Marais Informational Designation		Bay Shore Park, Au Sable Point	Grand Marais	August 14, 1962
Grand Marais Post Office Building	Grand Marais Post Office	Grand Marais Avenue at Randolph Street	Grand Marais	January 19, 1978
Hill's Store (demolished)	Hill's Store	Grand Marais Avenue	Grand Marais	January 6, 1971
Lake Superior Informational Designation		Roadside Park on M-28, 11 miles (18 km) west of Munising	Au Train Township	January 19, 1957
Lobb House†		203 West Onota Street	Munising	December 11, 1973
Mikulich General Store†		Corner of county roads H-01 and H-44	Traunik	October 23, 1987
Pacific Hotel	Pacific Hotel	100 Rock River Road (M-94)	Chatham	June 20, 1985
Paulson House†		South of Au Train on USFS Road 2278 in Hiawatha National Forest (Sec. 6, T46N, R20W)	Au Train Township	February 11, 1972
Pictured Rocks		Lake Superior, 2 miles (3.2 km) east of Munising	Munising	February 17, 1965
Tyoga Historical Pathway Informational Designation		Just north of the Village of Deerton	Deerton	June 10, 1987

== See also ==
- National Register of Historic Places listings in Alger County, Michigan

== Sources ==
- Historic Sites Online – Alger County. Michigan State Housing Developmental Authority. Accessed January 23, 2011.
