= Peter White (Michigan politician) =

American politician

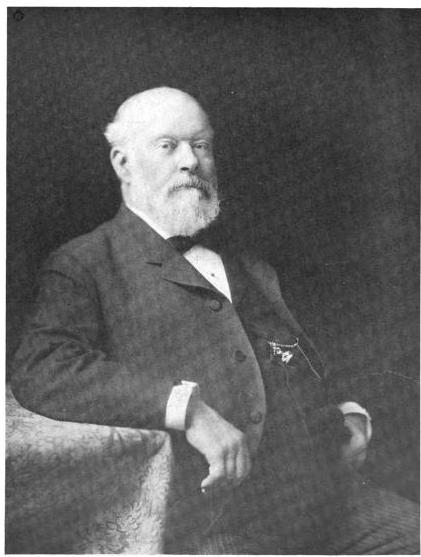
- Born: October 31, 1830; Rome, New York
- Died: June 6, 1908 (aged 77); Detroit, Michigan
- Spouse: Ellen S. Hewitt

Signature
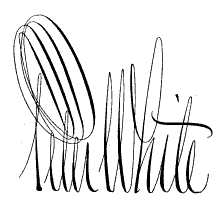

Peter White (October 31, 1830 – June 6, 1908) was one of the original settlers of Marquette, Michigan. He was a banker, businessman, real estate developer, and a philanthropist; and was involved in a number of the area's iron mining-related businesses, including acting as a director the Cleveland Iron Company. White served in many local and state public offices, including postmaster, county clerk, school board member, state representative and senator, and as a member of the state library commission and a Regent of the University of Michigan. Poet William Henry Drummond said of White, "the trail Peter White has cut through life is blessed by acts of private charity and deeds of public devotion that will serve as a guide to those who follow in the footsteps of a truly great, and above all, good man."

== Early life (1830–1848) ==
Peter White was born on October 31, 1830, in Rome, New York, the son of Peter Quintard White and Harriet Tubbs White. Peter's paternal grandparents were Captain Stephan White, who commanded Fort Stanwix in 1777 during the American Revolutionary War and Mary Quintard White, from whom Peter received his middle name.

Peter White's mother, Harriet, died when he was a young boy. Soon after, when Peter was nine, his family moved to Green Bay, Wisconsin. White attended school in Green Bay, and his father remarried. In 1842, White became dissatisfied with his family life, and left home to fend for himself at the age of 13.

As White travelled he encountered Bela J. Chapman, a prominent man of Mackinac County. “It was he who had brought Peter White, a small homeless waif to the North Country,” to Mackinac Island, where White performed odd jobs until he found steady employment tending a store. After a time, White drifted to Sault Ste. Marie, and from there hired on to crew a schooner sailing between Detroit and the Sault. During one of the voyages, the schooner sank, and the sailors took passage on another ship. While in port in Bay City, Michigan, White fell while boarding the ship and broke his arm. The arm was badly set and swelled; on arrival in Detroit, local doctors thought it required amputation. However, Dr. Zina Pitcher, invited to observe the operation, recommended waiting; the swelling subsided, Pitcher reset the arm, and White's arm was saved.

It took White's arm four months to heal, but as soon as he was able he began work as a clerk at Freeman & Bro., a store on Jefferson Avenue in Detroit. He stayed on as a clerk for a year, then shipped out, hoping to be an assistant lighthouse keeper at the Waugoshance Light. This position fell through, and White worked that summer building the crib pier at Waugoshance. When not working on the lighthouse, White worked as a store clerk and attended school on Mackinac Island. He remained on the island for two years.

== The iron fields and the founding of Marquette (1849–1850) ==
In 1849, Robert J. Graveraet arrived on Mackinac Island, looking for men to accompany him to prospect in the newly discovered iron fields of the Upper Peninsula, on behalf of what would become the Marquette Iron Company. A friend, customs inspector Samuel K. Haring, urged White to join the party. Sensing an opportunity, White joined, despite taking a pay cut. The party set sail from Mackinac Island, through Sault Ste. Marie, and eventually landed where Marquette, Michigan, is now located. The party moved inland, and took possession of the land west of the Jackson Mine, near what is now Ishpeming, Michigan, and the Cleveland Mines. After marking the site and spending a month clearing the area and prospecting for iron there, on June 10, 1849, they returned to the shore, expecting a shipment of machinery and more men from Worcester, Massachusetts. The ship had arrived, and the party cleared the ground in the area to locate a town. The settlement was first called Worcester, but the name was soon changed to "Marquette" in honor of Jacques Marquette.

More men arrived on a second ship, and the party cleared land and erected buildings in Marquette to house a machine shop, forge, saw mill, and other industrial efforts. White worked as a fireman with the steam boiler, then as a mechanic in the machine shop. Although still young, White was much in the confidence of Graveraet, the party's leader, due in part to White's nimble mind and facility with languages. In particular, White could speak both French and Chippewa, and Graveraet would task White with some delicate missions requiring one versed in language.

In the spring of 1850, the forge of the Marquette Iron Company was commissioned, and White was put in charge of the company store. By the fall, the town of Marquette had swelled in size, with workers for the Carp River Forge rolling into town. White took a job carrying mail between Marquette and L'Anse, but the pay never materialized, and he returned to his job at the company store.

== Public service in Marquette (1851–1857) ==
In the summer of 1851, the county of Marquette was organized, splitting off from Houghton County. White was elected county clerk and register of deeds, despite not being of the requisite age. As county clerk, White was also a member of the school board; he was elected treasurer of the board, a position he held until his death over 50 years later.

In 1852, W. H. Bruce of Green Bay, who had the responsibility of distributing mail to all of the Upper Peninsula, received Philo Everett's resignation as the postmaster of Carp River. Bruce knew Peter White's father Stephen, and apparently did not know that the Carp River settlement was growing moribund as its forge failed, and so appointed Peter White as the new postmaster of Carp River. White ran the Carp River post office out of the store he clerked at, which was indeed next door to the house of the Marquette postmaster. Because White's store was more convenient, more citizens began sending mail through the Carp River post office than the next-door Marquette post office, and the postal service, whose officials were in far-away Washington, D.C., soon closed the Marquette office. After some time, White formally changed the name of his post office to "Marquette," and he continued as the town's postmaster for a total of 12 years.

In May 1853, the Marquette Iron Company folded, in part due to concerns that its claims on the iron fields west of Jackson Mine would be superseded by a previous claim made by the Cleveland Iron Company. The Cleveland Company purchased the assets of the Marquette, including the company store where White worked. White continued working for the Cleveland Company for some time, but resigned in 1854 and opened his own store. In 1855, Peter White assumed the management of 64 acres of land in Marquette, which the Cleveland Company had received from the Marquette Iron Company. This was White's first taste of real estate dealings, a career which he expanded later.

The area around Marquette was growing, and in 1857 the state legislature was due to distribute lands granted to the state by the United States Congress. White ran for a seat in the legislature, hoping to represent Marquette while the land distribution was debated. He won, and that winter attended the legislative session in Lansing, taking 15 days to arrive after snowshoeing from Marquette to Escanaba. By accounts, he did an admirable job in the legislature, but he did not run for re-election. Also in 1857, the land office was transferred from Sault Ste. Marie to Marquette, and Marquette was made the port of entry in place of the Sault. White then took over the position of land register and collector of customs for the port.

Around this time White also began studying law, eventually forming the firm of White & Maynard, where he practiced for ten years. He also began the firm of Peter White & Co. in 1853, for the purpose of conducting banking business.

In fact, 1857 was a busy year for White. He still ran his store and worked as a lawyer, while simultaneously acting as county clerk, registrar of deeds, school board treasurer, postmaster, land registrar, and collector of customs. In addition, he served as a state representative, and he got married.

On September 29, 1857, White married Ellen S. Hewitt, the daughter of Dr. Morgan L. Hewitt, the first president of the Cleveland Company. The couple had six children, four of whom died young. (Saint Paul's Episcopal Church in Marquette contains stained glass windows dedicated to his children and a chapel built by Peter White in memory of his 12-year-old son Morgan.) Of the remaining two, one daughter married A. O. Jopling and had two children, before she also died, preceding White in death. White's lone remaining daughter, the only one of his children to outlive him, married George Shiras III, son of United States Supreme Court Justice George Shiras Jr.

== Peter White the businessman (1858–1880s) ==
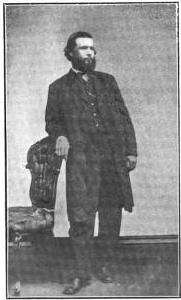
Peter White in the 1860s

In addition to his earlier real estate dealings, White began contracting to supply materials for construction. He supplied Norway pine for the Marquette ore docks.

White also tried his hand at banking through Peter White & Co., lending out money to some entrepreneurs such as Stephen Gay and his Bancroft Furnace. In 1862, White incorporated, starting the First National Bank of Marquette and serving as its first cashier.

White was also in the business of selling iron, usually piecemeal to schooners returning to more southern ports. He was able to obtain the iron from his contacts with the Bancroft Furnace. Near the end of the Civil War, White realized that once the war was over, American industry would want more iron than could be immediately supplied. Acting on that notion, White went on a buying spree, traveling to other ports such as Detroit and buying up iron warehoused there, often the same iron he himself had sold earlier. He quickly resold the iron in Cleveland for double what he paid for it, clearing $35,000. This money was the foundation of his personal fortune.

In 1869, White became president of the First National Bank, an office he held until his death. In addition to his banking and real estate business, he invested in other businesses. He at one time owned The Mining Journal, selling it in 1868 to Alfred P. Swineford, and owned the Upper Peninsula Brewing Company. Mining-related business opportunities abounded in the Marquette area; White was a director of the Cleveland Iron Company, and tried his hand at organizing both the Carp River Forge. and the Munising Furnace. He also began an insurance company, was a director of the People's State Savings Bank of Detroit, and owned large tracts of timbered land.

Somewhat later the town of Marquette was incorporated, and White ran for mayor. He was naturally a Democrat, although he broke with the party later over certain monetary positions. White did no campaigning, and lost the election. Four years later, he was unanimously elected to the position; however, he declined to serve.

In 1875, White was elected to the Michigan Senate, and was particularly successful in getting aid for a railroad between St. Ignace and Marquette. He also introduced a bill to establish a state-supported school in Marquette. Although unsuccessful then, White fought for 25 years for the establishment of such a school, and finally the Northern State Normal School (now Northern Michigan University) was opened in 1899. Although White again declined to run for re-election, he did campaign for Democratic presidential nominee Samuel J. Tilden, ran unsuccessfully for Congress in 1882, and in 1884 campaigned for Grover Cleveland.

== Peter White the philanthropist (1880s–1908) ==
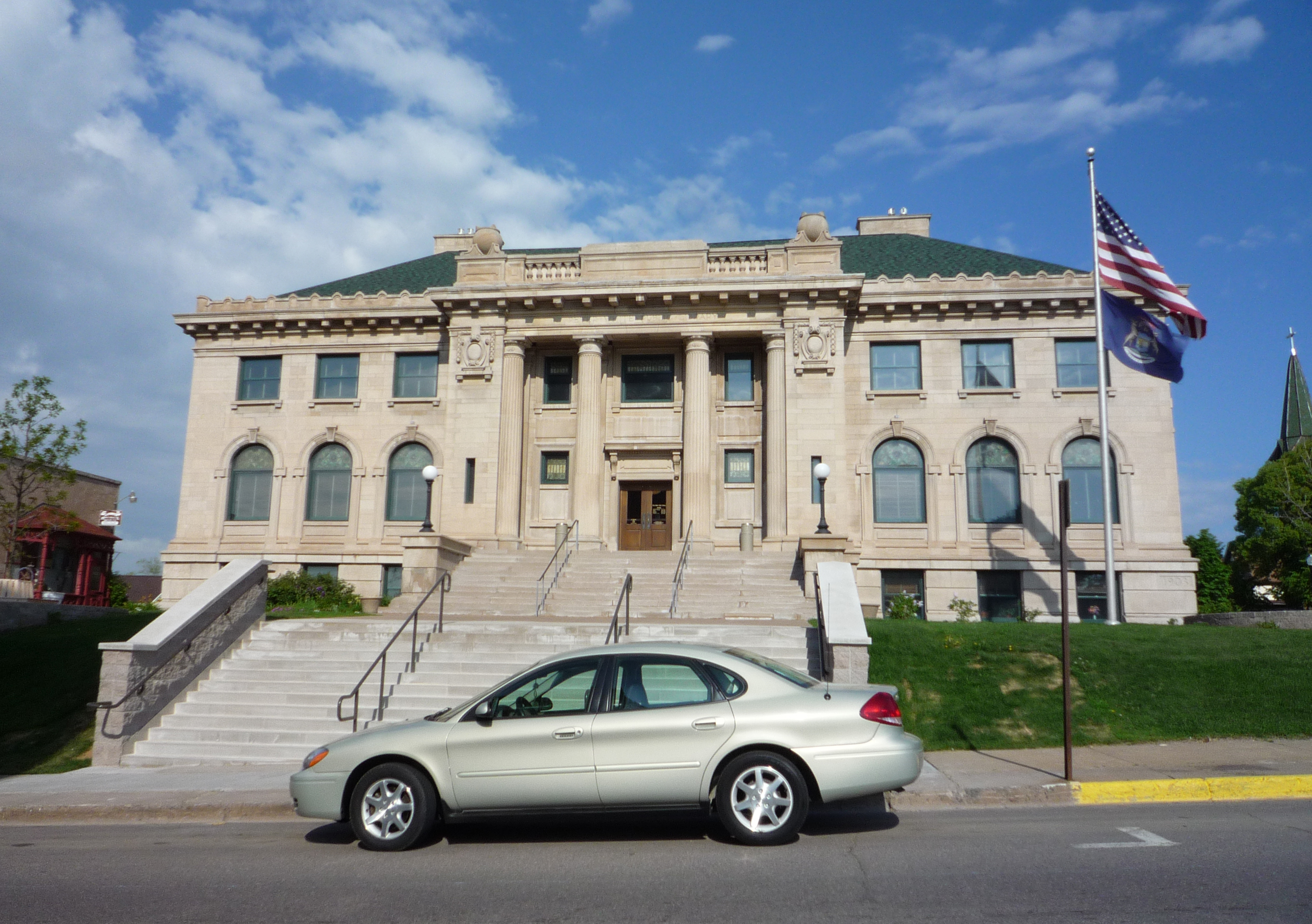
Front Street entrance, 1904 Peter White Public Library

White served as the Park and Cemetery Commissioner for Marquette for over forty years. In that capacity, he personally lobbied Congress to turn over Presque Isle, then reserved for a lighthouse, to the City of Marquette to turn into a public park. With that accomplished, he convinced the city council to accept the gift, and used his own fortune to improve the park and maintain it for five years.

In 1893, White was appointed one of the commissioners of the 1893 World's Fair. At around the same time, he began serving as president of the Mackinac Island State Park Commission, a position he kept until his death. He provided the city of Marquette with a bronze statue of its namesake, Jacques Marquette, which was unveiled in 1897.

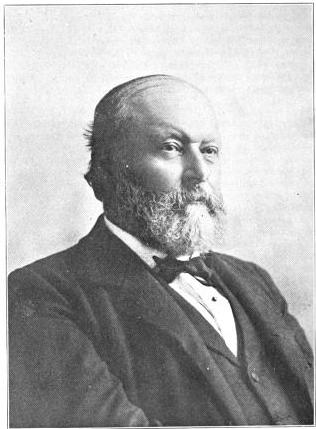
Peter White c. 1900

In 1899, after many years of advocacy by White and others, the Northern State Normal School (now Northern Michigan University) was opened. White gave the school's art department; in 1902, the school built the Peter White Science Hall.

One of White's most enduring philanthropies was the sponsorship of the Marquette public library. He began the library in 1872, constructing its first building and donating 10,000 books from his personal library to the city. Over time, the library grew, needing more space, and eventually White set aside space in his own bank building to house the library. Even that was not enough, and in 1904, White and other leading Marquette citizens erected the Peter White Public Library at a cost of $47,000. He was appointed a member of the State Board of Library Commissioners in 1903, a post he held until his death.

The University of Michigan conferred an honorary Master of Arts degree on White in 1900. White endowed fellowships at the university in history and classical studies, and in 1903, he was elected to the Board of Regents of the University of Michigan, a position he held until his death.

White's wife, Ellen, died in June 1905. On the morning of June 6, 1908, White complained of indigestion while visiting Detroit, and began a walk from City Hall back to the Ponchartrain Hotel. He fell on the street and died almost instantly. He was survived by one daughter and two grandchildren.
