= Paulson House =

Paulson House may refer to:

- Paulson House (Au Train, Michigan)
- John E. and Christina Paulson House, Coquille, Oregon, listed on the National Register of Historic Places (NRHP)
- Paulson-Gregory House, Newberg, Oregon, listed on the NRHP
