= Upper Peninsula Brewing Company Building =

- U.S. National Register of Historic Places
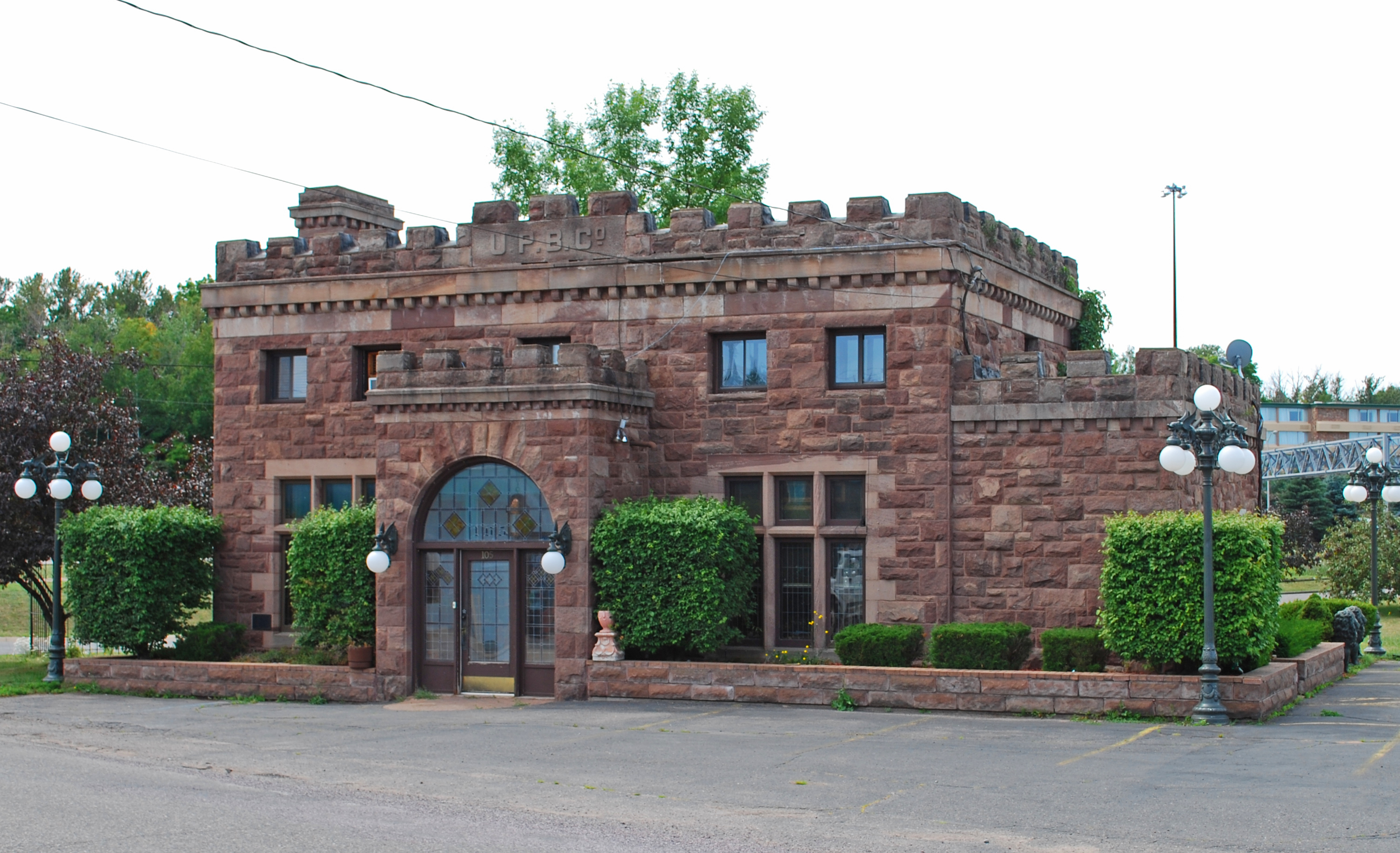
- Interactive map
- Location: Meeske St. and US 41, Marquette, Michigan
- Coordinates: 46°32′48.4″N 87°25′37.6″W
- Built: 1893
- Architectural style: Romanesque, Romanesque vernacular
- NRHP reference No.: 80001881
- Added to NRHP: May 15, 1980

The Upper Peninsula Brewing Company Building is an office building located at the intersection of Meeske Street and US 41 in Marquette, Michigan. It is also known as the Charles Meeske House. The structure served as the home and office of brewer Charles Meeske, secretary-treasurer and later president of the company. It was listed on the National Register of Historic Places in 1980.

== Structure Description ==
The single structure remaining from the 1894 complex is Meeske's home and office. It is a vernacular, two-story rectangular Romanesque Revival structure built of variegated, rough-cut sandstone. The structure has a stone chimney and crenelated parapets. The front entrance is recessed under an arched portico. The flat roof is encircled by a dentiled cornice with the initials "U.P.B.Co." carved in stone. The building originally had a tunnel leading to the brewery, allowing Meeske to ignore a law prohibiting a person from entering a brewery after sundown.

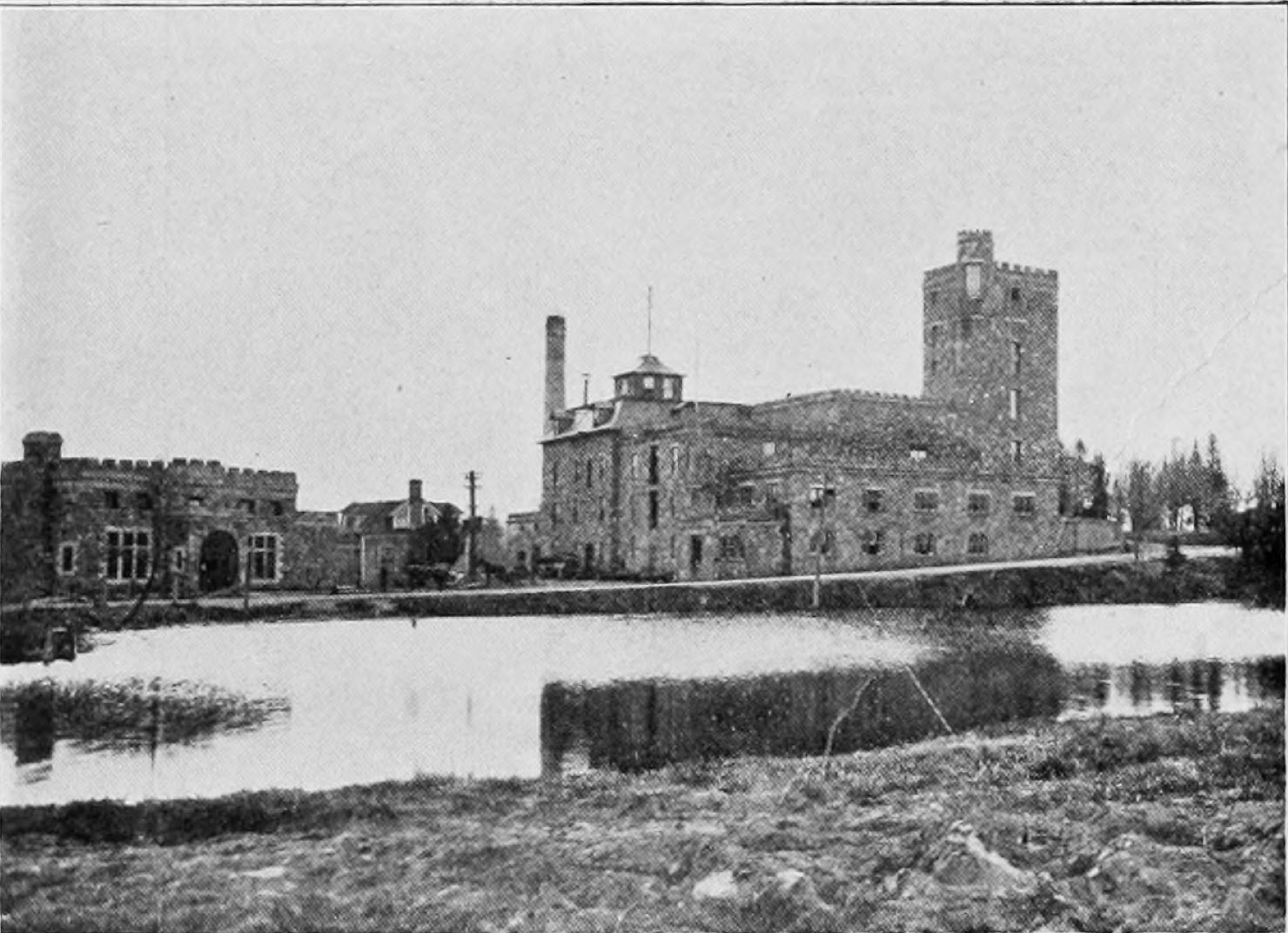
Upper Peninsula Brewing Company, 1912.

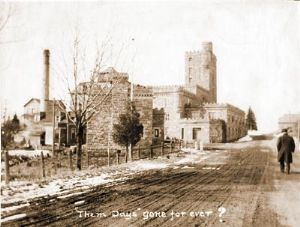
The Upper Peninsula Brewing Company complex in 1915.

== History ==
German brewer George Rublein immigrated to the United States in the mid-19th century, arriving in Marquette in 1849, not long after the city itself was founded. Rublein founded the Franklin Brewery just outside Marquette. The brewery burned down twice, and in 1875 Rublein moved his operation to what is now the corner of Meeske Street and US 41 near a natural spring, changing the name to "Concordia Brewery" in the process. Rublein built a series of frame buildings on the site which including ponds, outdoor seating and an area for live entertainment, replicating a German Biergarten.

However, Rublein soon got out of the beer business, and in 1879 sold the brewery to Peter White. White, in turn, leased the operation to a pair of brewers from Milwaukee, Wisconsin, Charles Meeske and Reiner Hoch. Under their leadership, the brewery prospered. Within two years, the partners found that their manufacturing couldn't meet demand, so in 1881 they built a second brewery in Negaunee, with Hoch taking personal charge of the Negaunee plant and Meeske remaining at the Marquette brewery. The next year, they had made enough money to buy the operation from White. With their purchase, Meeske and Hoch formed a company with Hoch as president, Meeske as secretary-treasurer, and two other men filling out the board of directors.

In the 1890s, Meeske replaced the earlier frame structures at the Marquette plant with a complex of sandstone buildings, constructed to resemble small castles. The 42-acre (170,000 m^{2}) complex included warehouses, residences, a tower, and a bottling plant. Meeske retained the German Biergarten landscaping the Rublein had initiated. The structure at the corner of Meeske and US41 was built in 1894, and served as Meeske's home and office, as well as the entrance to the brewery grounds.

In 1895, the brewery had a production capacity of between 20,000 and 25,000 barrels per year, sold under the name of Drei Kaiser (Three Kings) beer. With the onset of World War I in 1913, the name was changed to "Castle Brew."

Local prohibition groups pressured Marquette County to enact dry ordinances in 1916, four years before the beginning of country-wide Prohibition. When these ordinances were passed, the Upper Peninsula Brewing Company ended its beer production and went out of business, and Meeske moved to Duluth, Minnesota.

After the Upper Peninsula Brewing Company folded, the stone buildings in the complex were used as warehouses for a trucking firm. However, most of the buildings were eventually abandoned and fell into disrepair. Meeske's office building was more heavily utilized, serving as a rock shop, a law firm, and an antique shop. In 1974 and 1975 most of the buildings were demolished, saving only the office building and a horse barn along Meeske Street that is now part of Jilbert's Dairy. Offices for Detroit and Northern Savings Bank were built on the site. In 1980, Meeske's office was listed on the National Register of Historic Places, and in 1982 the structure was purchased by Humboldt Ridge and restored. The building is currently home to the Marquette office of the law firm Numinen, DeForge & Toutant, P.C.

== Charles Meeske ==
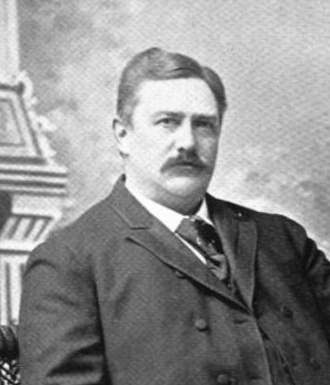
Charles Meeske

Charles Meeske was born in 1850 in Swinemünde in Prussia, and studied brewing under his father's tutelage. After his apprenticeship, Meeske served for three years in the German army. In 1871, Meeske emigrated to the United States, settling in Oshkosh, Wisconsin for two years where he worked as a foreman in a brewery. Meeske then moved to Milwaukee, where he opened a brewery along with his brothers, Gustave and Otto, and businessman Reiner Hoch. After three years of partnership, Meeske and Hoch bought out the other partners and continued brewing as Meeske & Hoch. In 1876, Meeske married Amelia Heineman, with whom he had three children. In 1878, Meeske and Hoch sold their Milwaukee brewery to a Chicago firm and moved to Marquette, where they took over the Upper Peninsula Brewing Company, with Meeske serving as secretary-treasurer. The two also bought a nearby milling company. In 1881, the firm opened a second plant in Negaunee; Hoch took personal control of the Negaunee plant while Meeske remained at the Marquette site. In addition to the brewery, Meeske was also connected to the Ishpeming Street Railway Company and the Marquette Savings Bank, as well as a number of mines. When Reiner Hoch left Marquette, Meeske took over the presidency of the company. When prohibition ordinances were enacted in Marquette County in 1916, Meeske moved to Duluth, Minnesota to join Reiner Hoch at his Duluth Brewing and Malting Company.

== Reiner Hoch ==
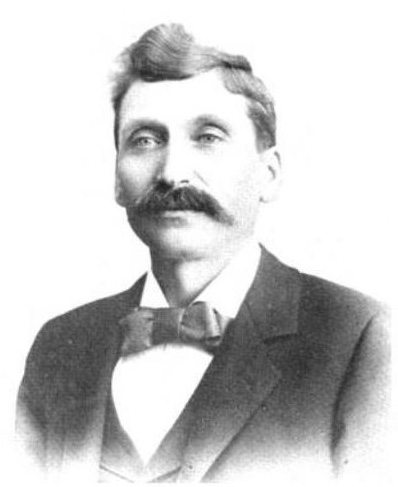
Reiner Hoch

Reiner Hoch was born near Cologne, Germany in 1851; his family emigrated to Waukesha County, Wisconsin, the next year. Hoch grew up on the family farm, and when he was eighteen attended business college in Milwaukee. After graduation, he entered the beer-bottling business with his brother-in-law, and then entered a partnership in a brewery with Charles Meeske and his two brothers. Hoch married Mathilda Geele in 1878, with whom he had three children. The same year, Hoch and Meeske moved to Marquette to run the Upper Peninsula Brewing Company, with Hoch eventually taking over the firm's Negaunee plant. Hoch had additional business interests, including a furniture company and the Negaunee and Ishpeming Street Railway. In 1896, Reiner Hoch moved to Duluth, Minnesota, where he founded the Duluth Brewing and Malting Company. The company remained in business through Prohibition and the Depression, and was eventually led by Charles Meeske's son Carl.
