= Carp River Forge =

Historic abandoned iron forge

- Jackson Iron Company Site
- U.S. National Register of Historic Places
- Michigan State Historic Site
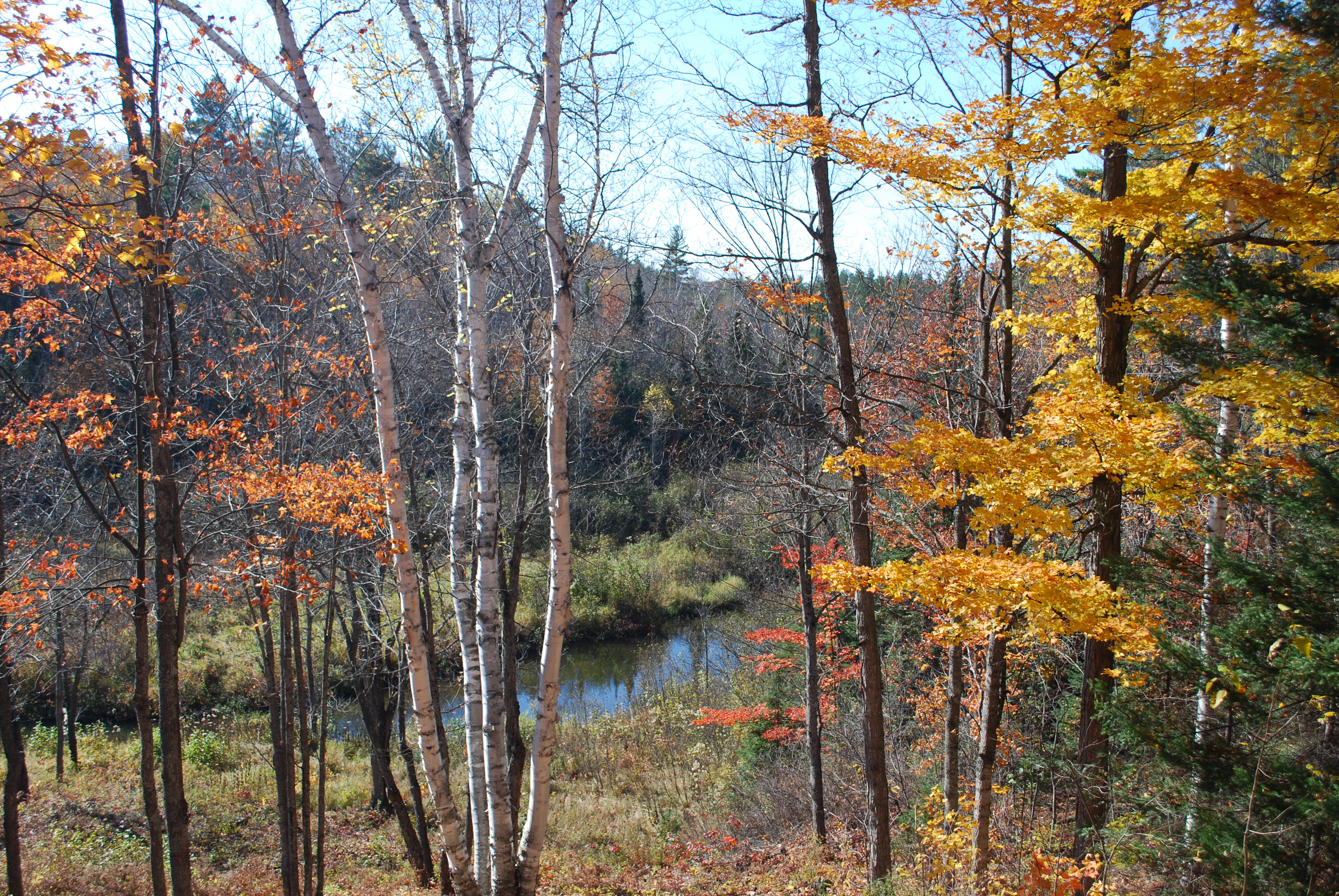
- Carp River Forge Site as seen from the Michigan Iron Industry Museum, 2010

- Location within Michigan Location within the United States
- Interactive map
- Nearest city: Negaunee, Michigan
- Coordinates: 46°31′17″N 87°33′56″W
- Area: 9 acres (3.6 ha)
- Built: 1848
- Architect: Jackson Mining Co.
- NRHP reference No.: 75000957

Significant dates
- Added to NRHP: May 30, 1975
- Designated MSHS: February 18, 1956

The Carp River Forge is an abandoned iron forge located along the Carp River on the grounds of the Michigan Iron Industry Museum, at 73 Forge Road near Negaunee, Michigan. It was the first forge constructed in northern Michigan; the site was designated a Michigan State Historic Site in 1956 and listed on the National Register of Historic Places in 1975. It is also known as the Jackson Iron Company Site.

== History ==
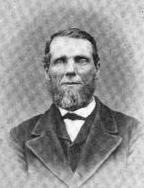
Ariel N. Barney

In the winter of 1846/47, the Jackson Mine company gathered materiel to begin its mining operations and to build a forge. Construction on the forge, supervised by William McNair, was begun in 1847 at a site on the Carp River, a few miles from the then-new Jackson Mine. McNair, however, knew nothing of forge construction, and progress was slow until forgemaster Ariel N. Barney arrived in July. Barney took over supervision of the project, and more progress was made. The forge site consisted of an 18-foot-high (5.5 m) dam across the Carp, with a waterwheel supplying power, eight fires, and a forging hammer.

A small settlement, known as "the Jackson Location" grew up around the forge. The site was large enough to be assigned its own post office, the Carp River PO, in 1847.

Construction continued until early 1848, and the first iron was made on February 10, 1848, by forgemaster Ariel N. Barney. These first pieces were sold to construct a steamer. However, in March, a wave of snowmelt carried away the dam on the river, and the forge remained idle until repairs were made in the summer.

The Carp River forge proved to be financially unprofitable, due in large part to the difficulties of transporting both iron ore and forge supplies to the forge site, and, as Mining Magazine dryly put it, "both from the want and excess of water as a driving power." The daily output from the forge was about three tons when it was working smoothly, which was rarely. The Jackson Mining Company operated the forge sporadically, and only until 1850. The Carp River post office closed in 1851. After that, the company leased the facilities to a succession of individuals and small companies, including a young Peter White, who would go on to become one of Marquette's most prominent citizens. All the lessees lost money, and the forge was closed for good and abandoned in 1854, having made "little iron and no money."

Images of Site

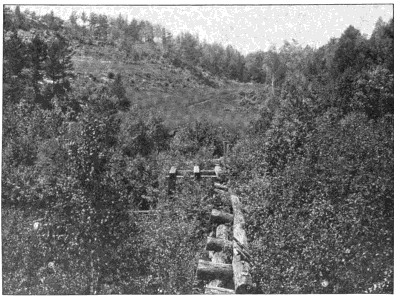
Carp River Forge site c. 1907; remains of dam in the foreground

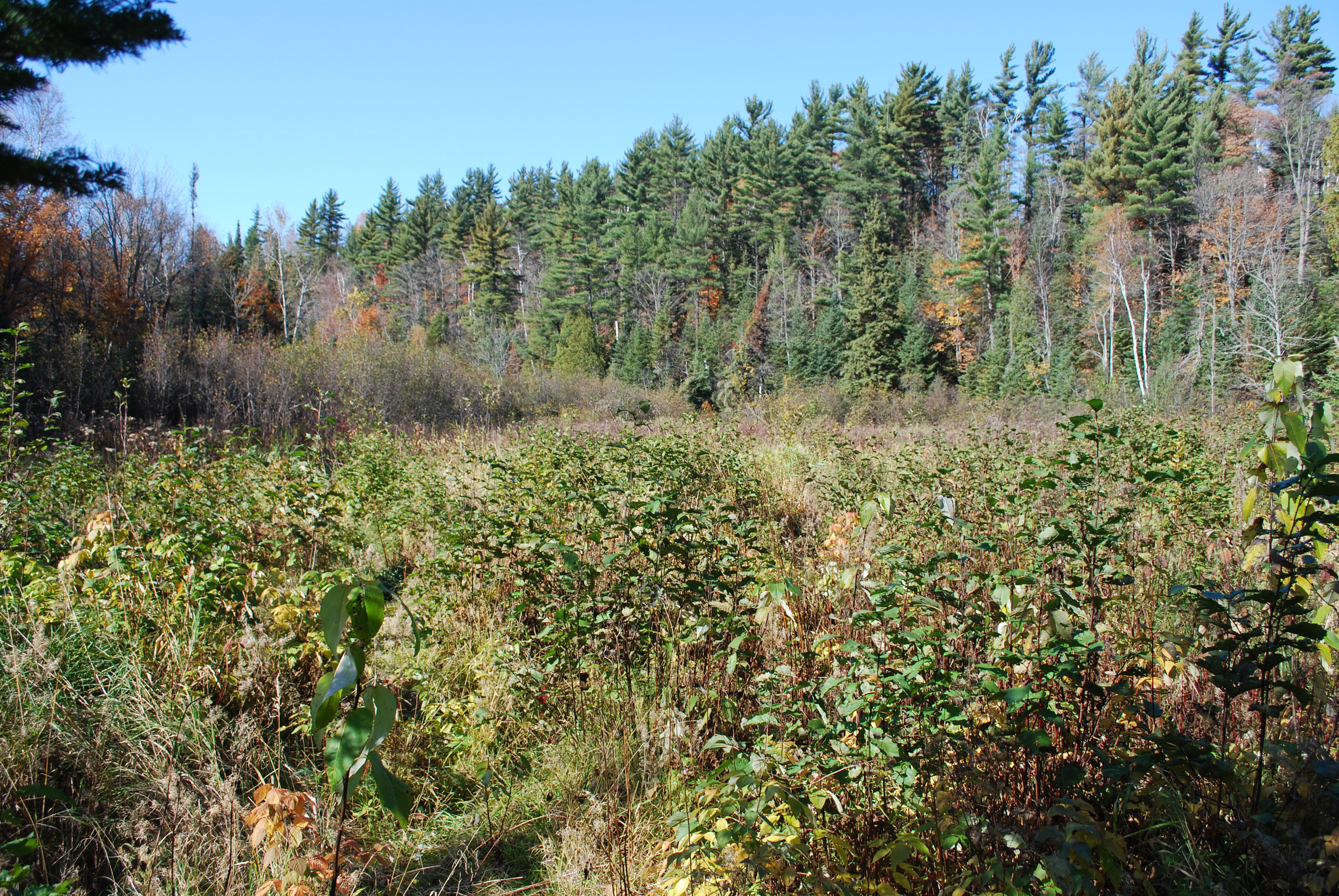
Carp River Forge site, 2010
