= King Road–Whitefish River Bridge =

- U.S. National Register of Historic Places
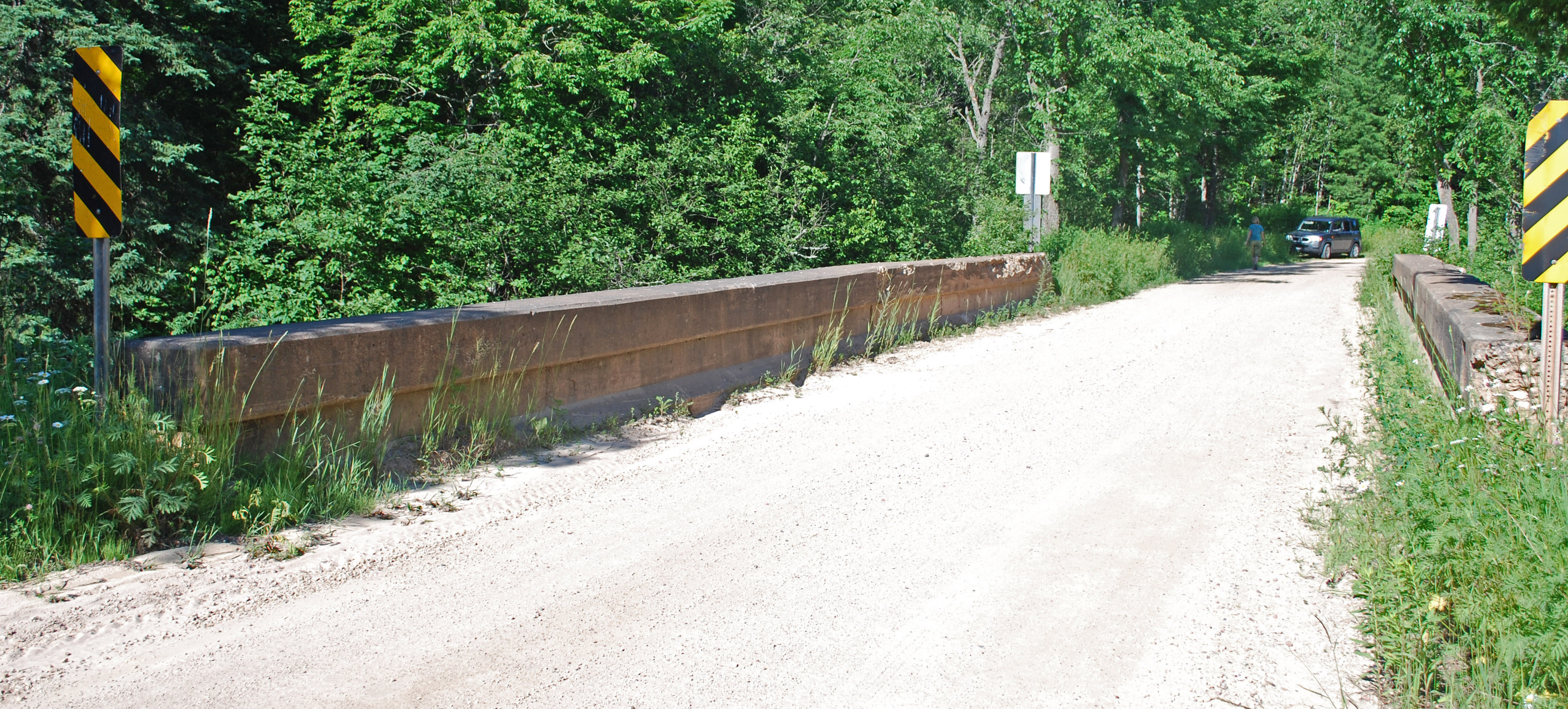
- Bridge deck

- Location within Michigan Location within the United States
- Interactive map
- Location: King Road over Whitefish River, Limestone Township, Michigan
- Coordinates: 46°15′49″N 87°5′34″W
- Area: less than one acre
- Built: 1919
- Built by: Samuel Mills
- Architect: Michigan State Highway Department
- Architectural style: concrete through girder
- MPS: Highway Bridges of Michigan MPS
- NRHP reference No.: 99001463
- Added to NRHP: November 30, 1999

The King Road–Whitefish River Bridge is a bridge located on King Road (Old US Highway 41, US 41) over the Whitefish River in Limestone Township, Michigan. It was listed on the National Register of Historic Places in 1999.

== History ==
In the 1910s, a system of three trunk line roads was constructed in Alger County. One of these roads ran from Trenary to Skandia. By the end of the decade, this road was nearly complete; the last link was the construction of a bridge over the Whitefish River. In 1919, the Michigan State Highway Department engineers designed what was designated as Trunk Line Bridge Number 264, based on a standard design that the agency had developed in 1913–14.

The agency awarded the contract to construct the bridge to Samuel Mills of Escanaba. Mills built the bridge in 1919 for $1,688.25. The trunk line, including this bridge, was later incorporated into US 41. Later still, the highway was re-aligned, and a new bridge was built over the Whitefish River approximately one-half mile south of this bridge. The 1.5-mile-long (2.4 km) section of road that included the old bridge was redesignated King Road, and still carries local traffic.

== Description ==
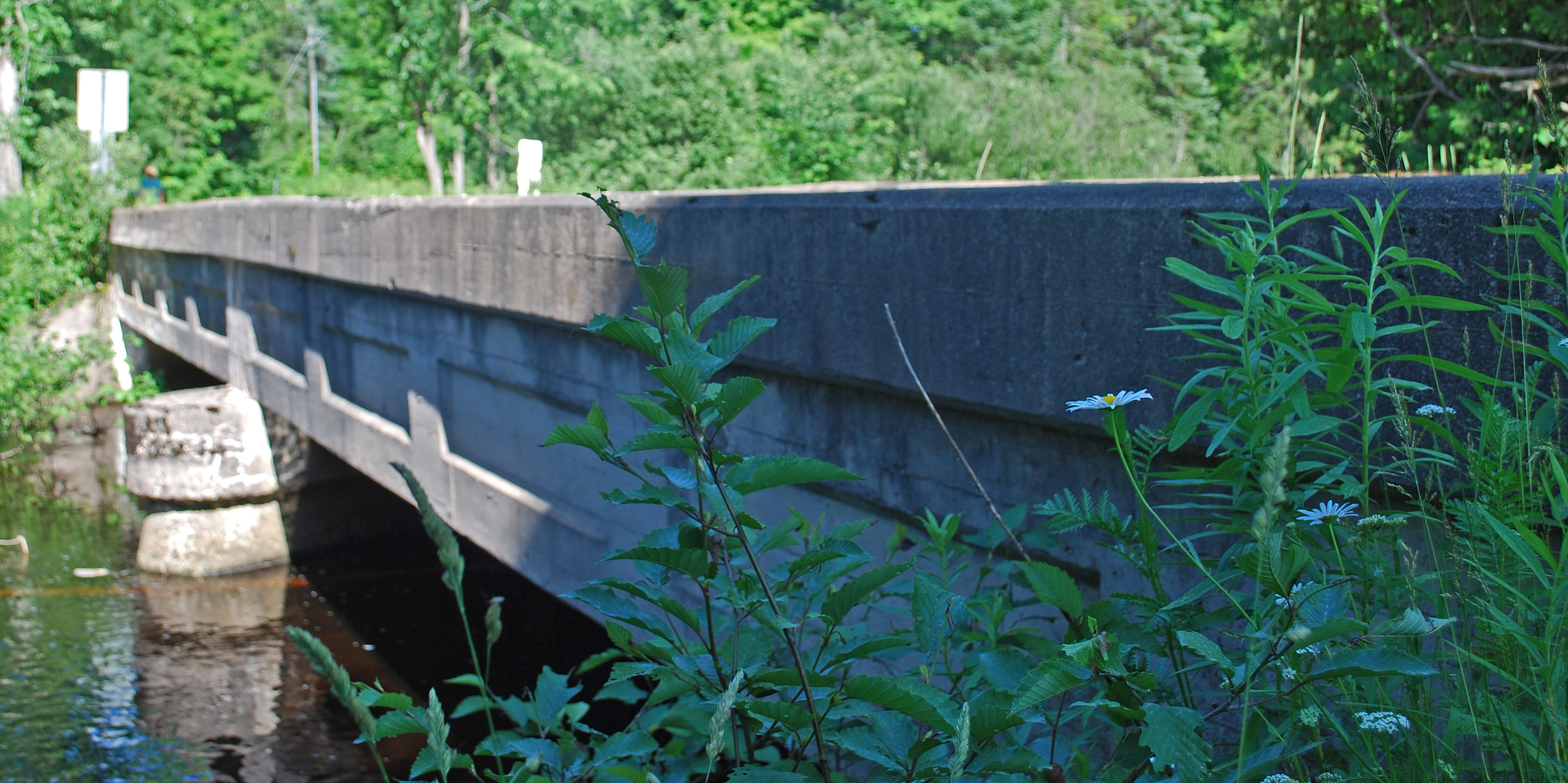
Side of bridge

The King Road–Whitefish River Bridge is a girder bridge built on two skewed 35-foot (11 m) through girders, supported by concrete abutments and a center pier. The deck is a concrete slab, with the girders rising above to form the guardrails on either side. A bronze plate designating the bridge as a "Trunk Line Bridge" is mounted on the girders’ inside walls. The structure is fundamentally unaltered, but has undergone a considerable amount of concrete spalling and chipping.

The King Road–Whitefish River Bridge is notable due in part to its relatively early construction date as a girder-style bridge and its two-span configuration.

== See also ==
- List of bridges on the National Register of Historic Places in Michigan
- National Register of Historic Places listings in Alger County, Michigan
