= Widewaters site =

Archaeological site in Michigan, United States

- Widewaters Site
- U.S. National Register of Historic Places
- Location within Michigan Location within the United States
- Location: Alger County, Michigan
- Coordinates: 46°14′0″N 86°38′20″W
- MPS: Woodland Period Archaeological Sites of the Indian River and Fishdam River Basins MPS
- NRHP reference No.: 14000368
- Added to NRHP: June 27, 2014

The Widewaters Site, also designated 20AR245 , is an archaeological site located in Alger County, Michigan. The site dates from the Woodland period, and is situated on a terrace above the Indian River about 30 ft (9.1 m) from the water, about 0.62 mi (1 km) from the Bar Lake site. It was used as a camp, and is near a stand of wild rice. It was listed on the National Register of Historic Places in 2014.
