= Schoolcraft Furnace site =

Archaeological site in Michigan, United States

- U.S. National Register of Historic Places
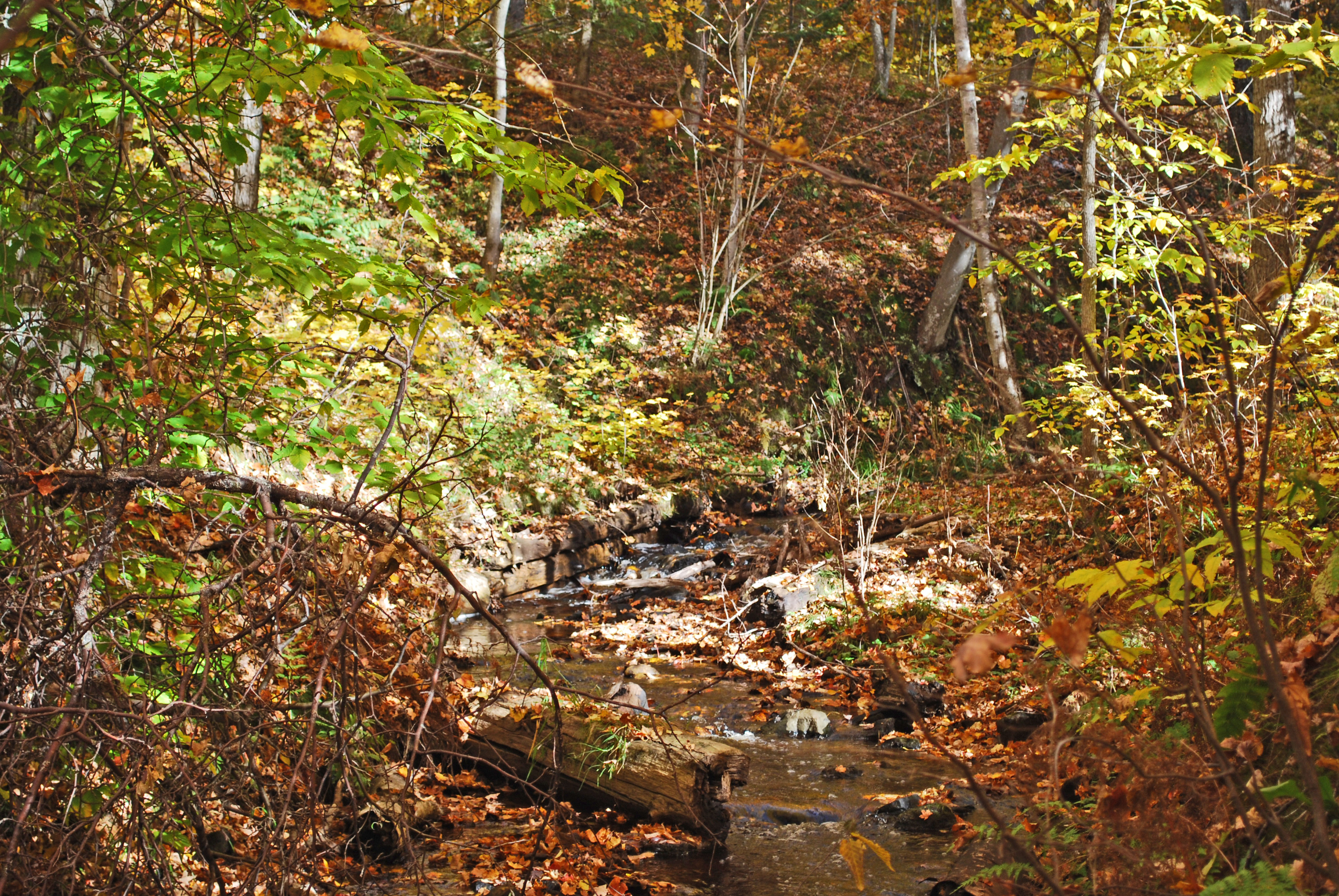
- Schoolcraft Furnace Site, 2010

- Location within Michigan Location within the United States
- Interactive map
- Nearest city: Munising, Michigan
- Coordinates: 46°25′26″N 86°37′21″W
- Area: 10 acres (4.0 ha)
- Built: 1867
- Architect: Peter White, Henry Mather
- NRHP reference No.: 77000151
- Added to NRHP: December 28, 1977

The Schoolcraft Furnace site is an abandoned iron furnace site located just east of Munising, Michigan, within the Pictured Rocks National Lakeshore near the Munising Falls Visitor Center. It was listed on the National Register of Historic Places in 1977. It is also known as the Munising Furnace.

== History ==
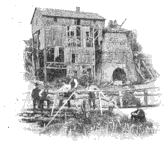
Munising Furnace during operation

Munising was founded in 1850 as a resort village by the Munising Company, but the company's capital was over extended and their plan never came to fruition. Two more companies were formed to develop the Munising Company's assets, but neither prospered. In 1866, Henry Mather and Peter White acting as agents for a group of investors, purchased the land around Munising and created the Schoolcraft Iron Company. A site for the furnace was selected on Munising Creek, about 1100 feet from Munising Bay, and in 1867 construction was started on a furnace. A stack was built from sandstone quarried locally on Grand Island, furnace machinery was brought in from Newburgh, New York, and about 500 people were employed cutting cordwood. The Schoolcraft Furnace was fired the first time on June 28, 1868.

The furnace used iron ore shipped in via rail from Negaunee and Ishpeming to Marquette, and thence by boat to Munising. Charcoal was made in kilns within a few miles of the furnace; seventeen of these have been located. The furnace also used limestone shipped in from the Lake Erie region. A small steam engine was operated to crush the ore and a larger one supplied air to the furnace.

However, after the first fire, the furnace was run only irregularly. Problems with wet charcoal and shortages of ore or charcoal forced several shutdowns. Despite this, by 1869 the furnace was putting out an average of 20 tons of pig iron per day. However, finances for the furnace were shaky, and poor business decisions in 1870 increased the Schoolcraft Iron Company's debt until it collapsed into bankruptcy in October 1870.

Peter White organized a new company, the Munising Iron Company, and purchased the furnace in 1871. The furnace was reopened in the fall of that year, and ran for 12 months, making a total of 2500 tons of iron. It was shut down in the fall of 1872 to add a hopper and bell, improving efficiency. The furnace was back online in May, but only four months later the Panic of 1873 hit, driving down iron prices. The furnace was online again for 24 weeks in 1875 before a lack of iron and charcoal shut it down again. In 1876, the furnace was leased to Henry Pickands, who ran it until November 1877, when it was leased to Daniel Rankin. Rankin intended to fire the furnace in 1878, but was no able to, and the furnace was shut down for good.

The final closing of the Schoolcraft Furnace devastated Munising, and many people in the town left to seek work elsewhere. Munising declined until the Munising Railway was opened in 1895, and a large tannery was established later, providing more jobs for the area. In 1901, the furnace machinery was purchased by the Lake Superior Iron and Metal Company of Hancock, Michigan; much of the equipment was melted down as scrap and remade into machinery for the copper mines of the Keweenaw Peninsula.

The Schoolcraft Furnace was placed on the National Resister of Historic Places in 1977. The remains of the site are difficult to distinguish; the old road trace is now a hiking trail, and some of the rubble pile can be identified in the now-wooded area. The ruins of what might have been a corduroy road are visible in the creek. The area is publicly accessible from the Munising Falls Visitor Center.

Forge site images, 2010
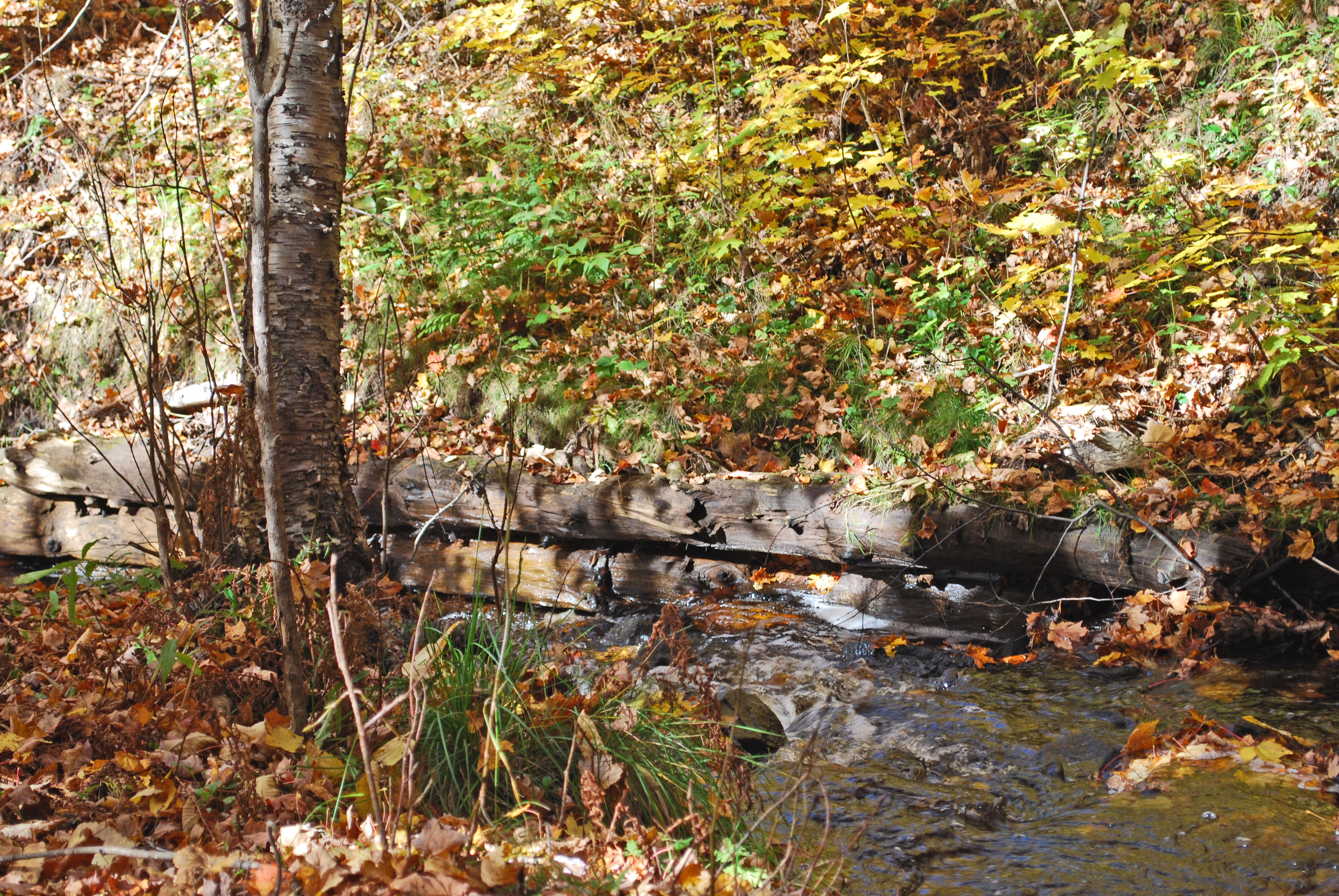
Creek with ruins of what may be a corduroy road

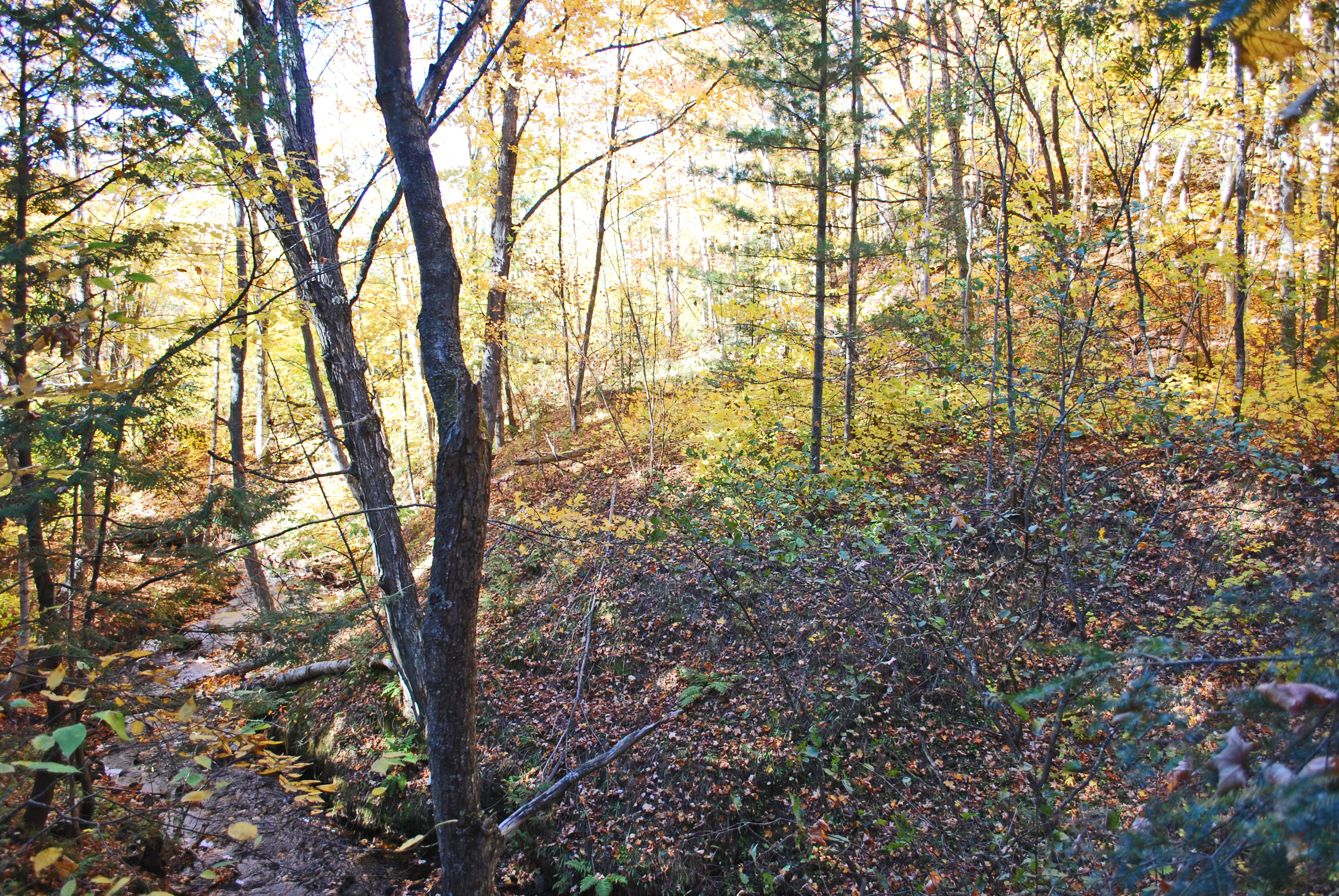
Rubble pile

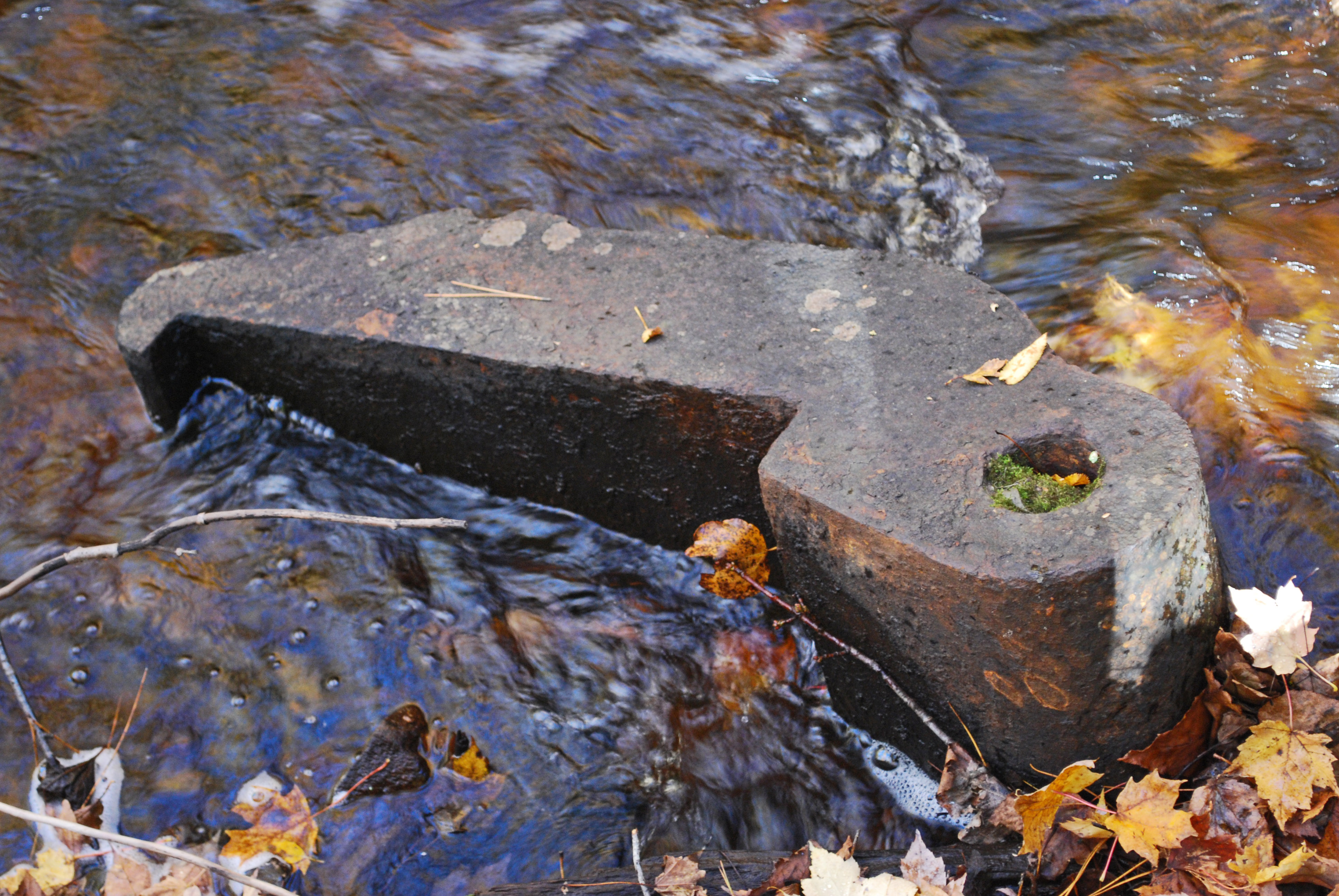
One piece of machinery left on site
