= Hartney Terrace site =

Archaeological site in Michigan, United States

- Hartney Terrace Site
- U.S. National Register of Historic Places
- Location within Michigan Location within the United States
- Location: Alger County, Michigan
- Coordinates: 46°15′50.5″N 86°40′23.2″W
- MPS: Woodland Period Archaeological Sites of the Indian River and Fishdam River Basins MPS
- NRHP reference No.: 14000367
- Added to NRHP: June 27, 2014

The Hartney Terrace Site, also designated 20AR310, is an archaeological site located in Alger County, Michigan. The site dates from the Woodland period, approximately 950 years before the present. It is located near a stand of wild rice. It was listed on the National Register of Historic Places in 2014.
