= Bar Lake site =

Archaeological site in Michigan, United States

- Bar Lake Site
- U.S. National Register of Historic Places
- Location within Michigan Location within the United States
- Location: Alger County, Michigan
- Coordinates: 46°14′16″N 86°38′55″W
- MPS: Woodland Period Archaeological Sites of the Indian River and Fishdam River Basins MPS
- NRHP reference No.: 14000366
- Added to NRHP: June 27, 2014

The Bar Lake Site, also designated 20AR437 , is an archaeological site located in Alger County, Michigan along the Indian River about 40 feet from the water and 1 km from the Widewaters Site. It was listed on the National Register of Historic Places in 2014.

The site dates from the Woodland period, and was likely used as a hunting and fishing camp from about AD 1100 to AD 1600. Fragments of animal bone indicate that moose and beaver were hunted at the site. Additional artifacts found include fragments of at least nine Oneota vessels, projectile points, and other tools used for cutting, scraping, and grinding. The site is located near a stand of wild rice.
