= Old M-94–Au Train River Bridge =

- M-94 (old)–Au Train River Bridge
- U.S. National Register of Historic Places
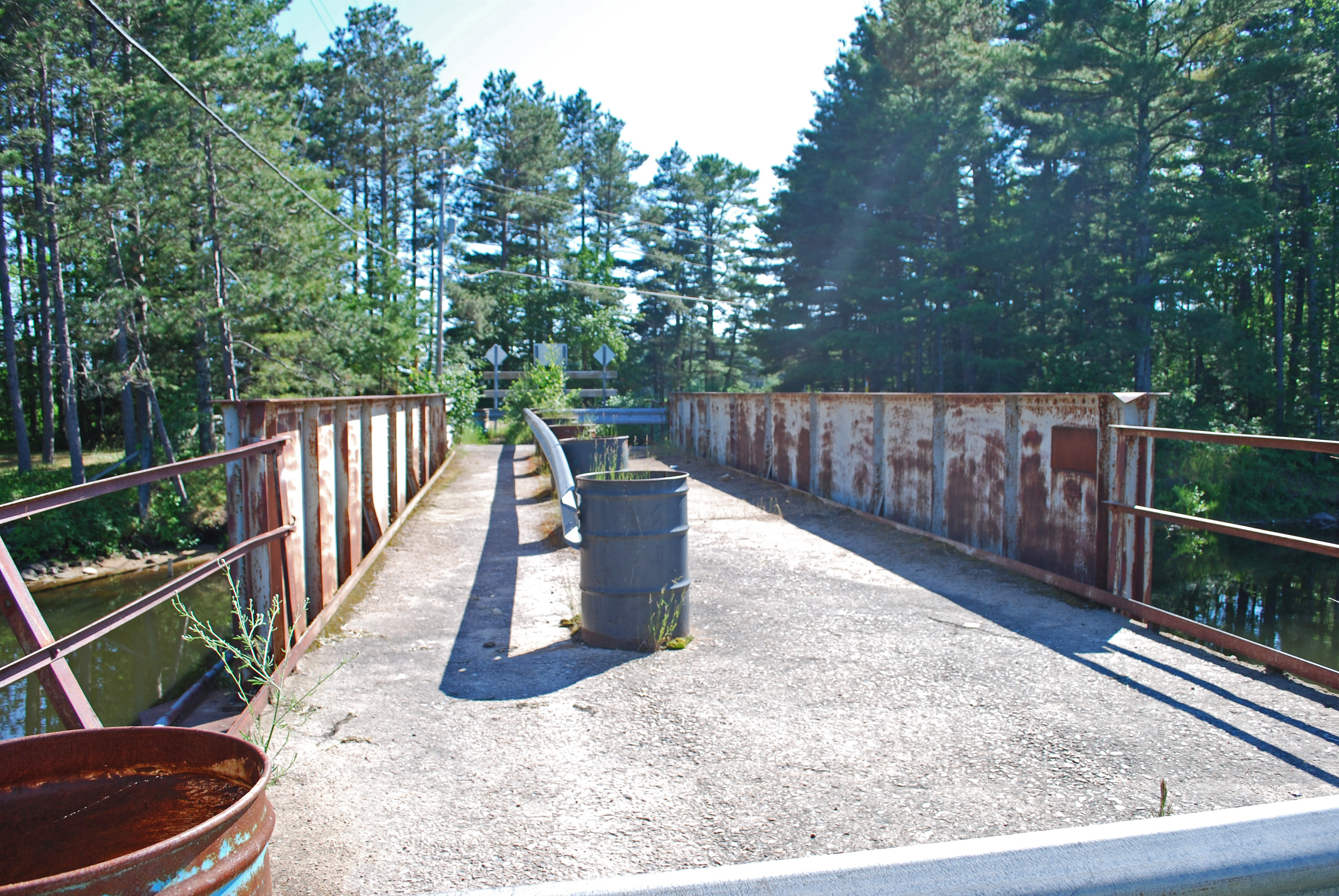
- Roadway

- Location within Michigan Location within the United States
- Interactive map
- Location: Wolkoff Road over Au Train River, Au Train Township, Michigan
- Coordinates: 46°26′0″N 86°49′27″W
- Area: less than one acre
- Built: 1914
- Built by: Worden-Allen Company
- Architect: Michigan State Highway Department
- Architectural style: steel through girder bridge
- MPS: Highway Bridges of Michigan MPS
- NRHP reference No.: 99001462
- Added to NRHP: November 30, 1999

The Old M-94–Au Train River Bridge is a bridge located on Wolkoff Road over the Au Train River in Au Train Township, Michigan. It was listed on the National Register of Historic Places in 1999, and is significant because it is one of only two remaining bridges built to an early 20th-century Michigan State Highway Department design standard.

== History ==
The Michigan State Highway Department (MSHD) first published standard designs in 1907–1908. Among these standards were plans for steel plate through girder bridges intended for mid-size spans of 30 to 60 feet (9.1 to 18.3 m). This style of girder bridge was used in the state with some moderate frequency between 1908 and 1915, including on this bridge, built in 1914.

The bridge was built by Alger County or Au Train Township as part of construction work on what was then a secondary road running along the Lake Superior shoreline between Munising and Au Train. A 19th century-syle substructure was used to support the bridge, and the superstructure was fabricated in Milwaukee, Wisconsin by the Worden-Allen Company to the specifications of the MSHD bridge standards. The bridge reportedly cost $35,000.

The road along the shore and the Au Train River bridge were later incorporated into M-94, which was redesignated as M-28 in the 1930s. M-28 was later rerouted, leaving the bridge once again on a secondary road. The bridge was later closed to vehicular traffic, and is currently partially blocked by 55-gallon drums and steel railing, limiting it to pedestrian and snowmobile traffic.

== Description ==
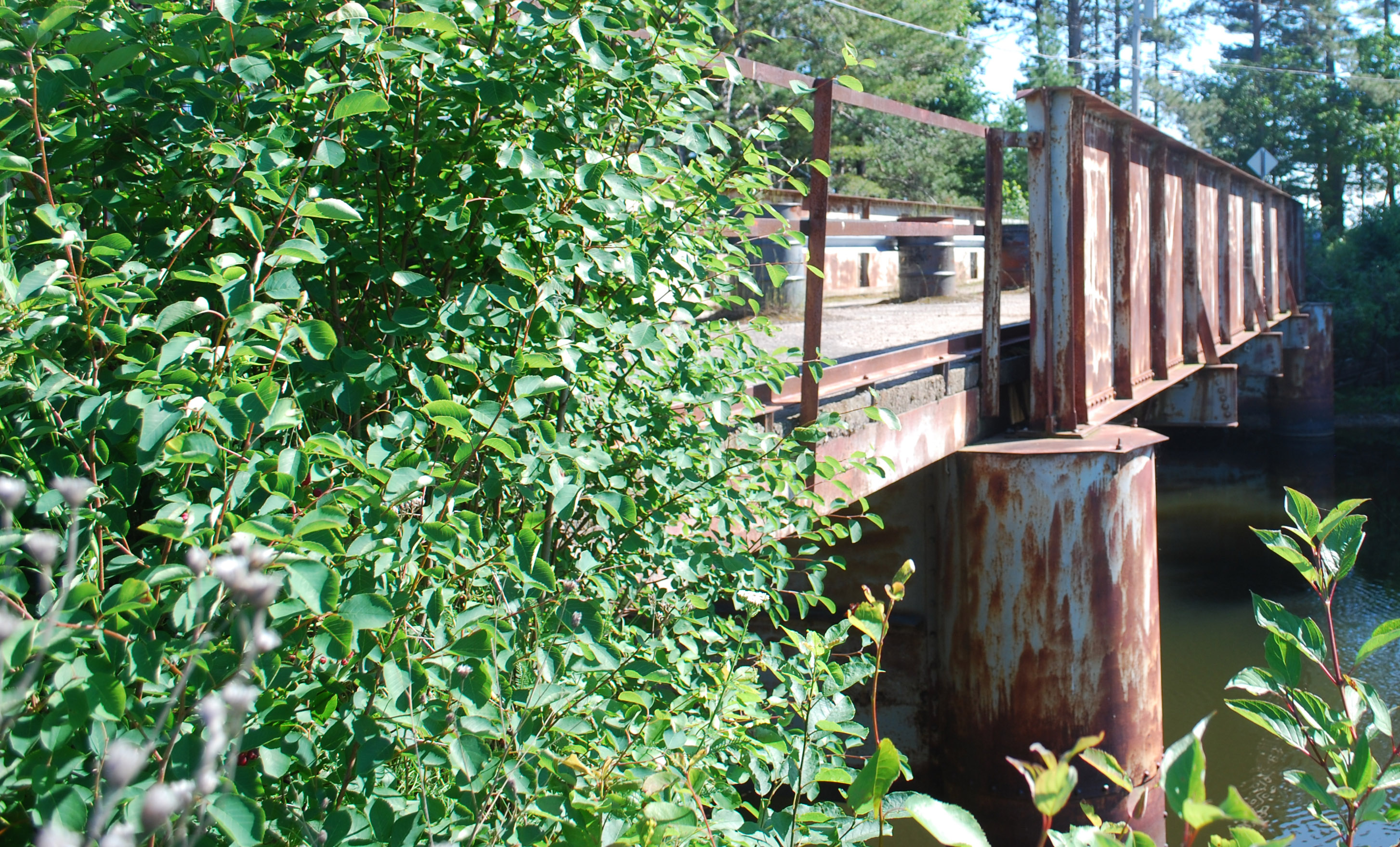
Sidewall of bridge

The Old M-94–Au Train River Bridge uses a 60-foot (18 m) span MSHD standard through girder bridge design to carry Wolkoff Road over the Au Train River. The structure has a single plate girder span, with a steel stringer approach span on each end. The stringers are supported by concrete abutments and concrete-filled steel cylinder piers. The main span consistes of two 60-foot (18 m) through girders, joined by four I-beams underneath.
