= Lobb House =

Historic house in Michigan, United States

- U.S. National Register of Historic Places
- Michigan State Historic Site
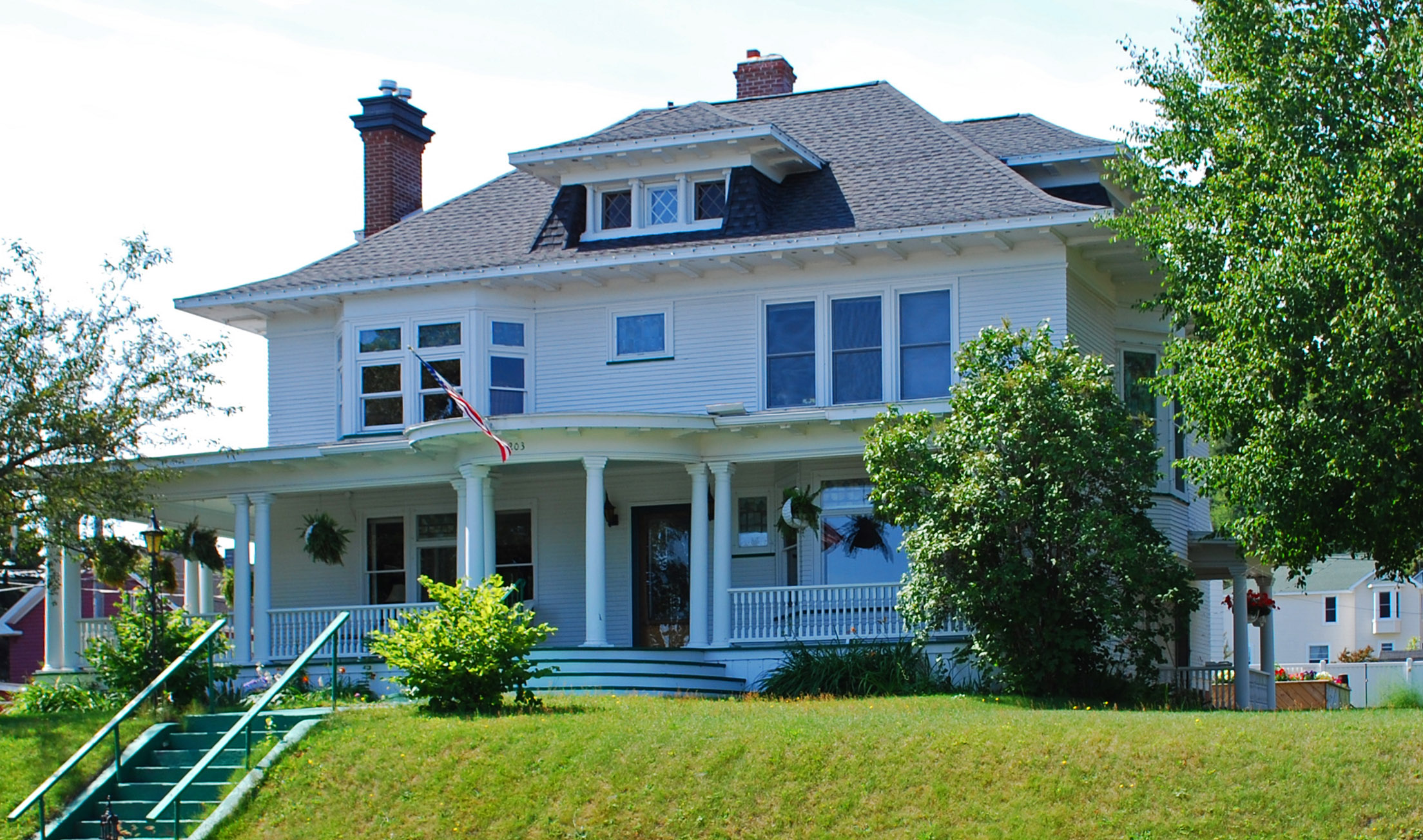

- Location within Michigan Location within the United States
- Interactive map
- Location: 203 W. Onota St., Munising, Michigan
- Coordinates: 46°24′38″N 86°39′26″W
- Built: 1907
- Architect: Edward DeMar
- Architectural style: American Foursquare
- NRHP reference No.: 76001023

Significant dates
- Added to NRHP: October 08, 1976
- Designated MSHS: December 11, 1973

The Lobb House is a private single-family house located at 203 West Onota Street in Munising, Michigan. It is also known as the Lobb-Madigan House. It was listed on the National Register of Historic Places in 1976.

== History ==
Edward and Elizabeth Lobb owned the prosperous Princeton Mine in Marquette County and the Anna River Brick Company, founded in 1887. The Lobbs were the leading family of Munising in the late 19th century due to the prosperity and importance of their business interests. Edward Lobb died c. 1892, leaving the family's fortunes in the capable hands of Elizabeth. She continued operating the brickyard along with her son Nathaniel, and in 1905-1906 built this house designed by Sault Ste. Marie architect Edward DeMar.

The house was sold by the Lobb family in 1945 to John and Francis Madigan, and in 1973 the Madigans sold it to the Alger County Historical Society for use as a museum.

== Description ==
The Lobb House is a two-and-one-half-story structure, 42 feet by 28 feet, sided with clapboard. The roof is hipped, with hipped dormers, and the exposed eaves extend well beyond the exterior walls. A veranda with Ionic columns graces two sides of the house. The interior uses a large amount of oak woodwork.
