= Hill's Store =

- Formerly listed on the U.S. National Register of Historic Places
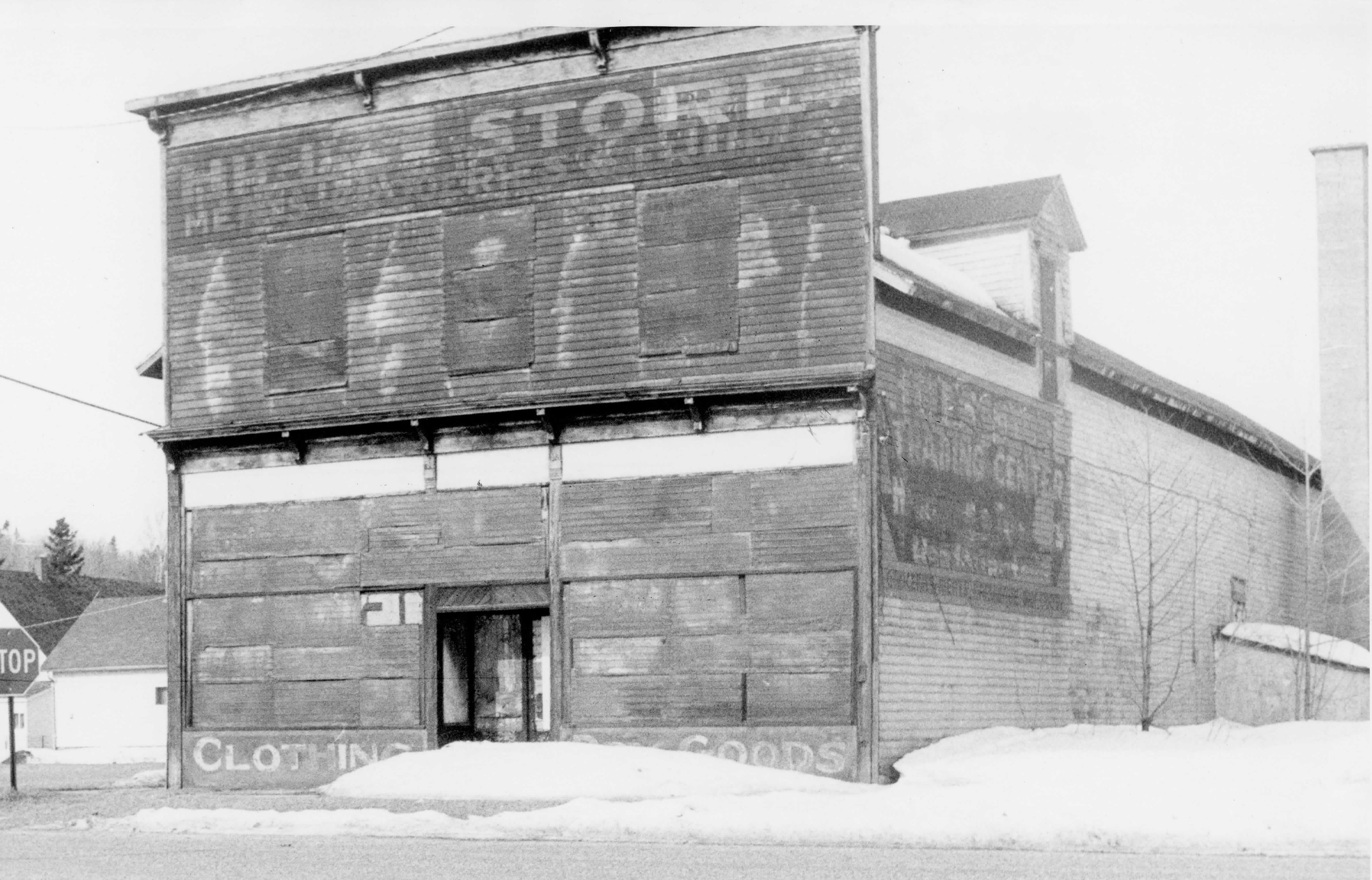
- Hill's Store, 1970
- Interactive map
- Location: Grand Marais Ave., Grand Marais, Michigan
- Coordinates: 46°40′15″N 85°59′2″W
- Area: less than one acre
- Built: 1895
- Demolished: 1973
- NRHP reference No.: 73002200

Significant dates
- Added to NRHP: April 16, 1971
- Removed from NRHP: February 27, 1973

Hill's Store was a commercial building located on Grand Marais Avenue in Grand Marais, Michigan. It was listed on the National Register of Historic Places in 1973, but demolished and de-listed that same year.

== History ==
In the 1890s, Wilkes W. Hargrave and Roy C. Hill were operating a store in Seney, Michigan. When that town began dying, in about 1895, they moved to Grand Marais and constructed this building and opened a new store, called "Hargrave and Hill".

The store remained open until 1951. The pair operated the store until 1915, when Hargrave sold his interest to Hill. Hill operated the store until the 1930s when he sold it to his son, Irving G. Hill. The store's name was changed to Hill's Store, and operated until it closed in 1951. The store and its contents was purchased by Warren and Jacobites, but was never reopened.

It was demolished in 1973.

== Description ==
The building was a two-story frame structure on a cement foundation. It had a false front and a cornice. It had a center entrance flanked by store windows. A rope elevator is located in the rear of the building, and four dormers pierce the roof.
