= Paulson House (Au Train, Michigan) =

Historic house in Michigan, United States

- U.S. National Register of Historic Places
- Michigan State Historic Site
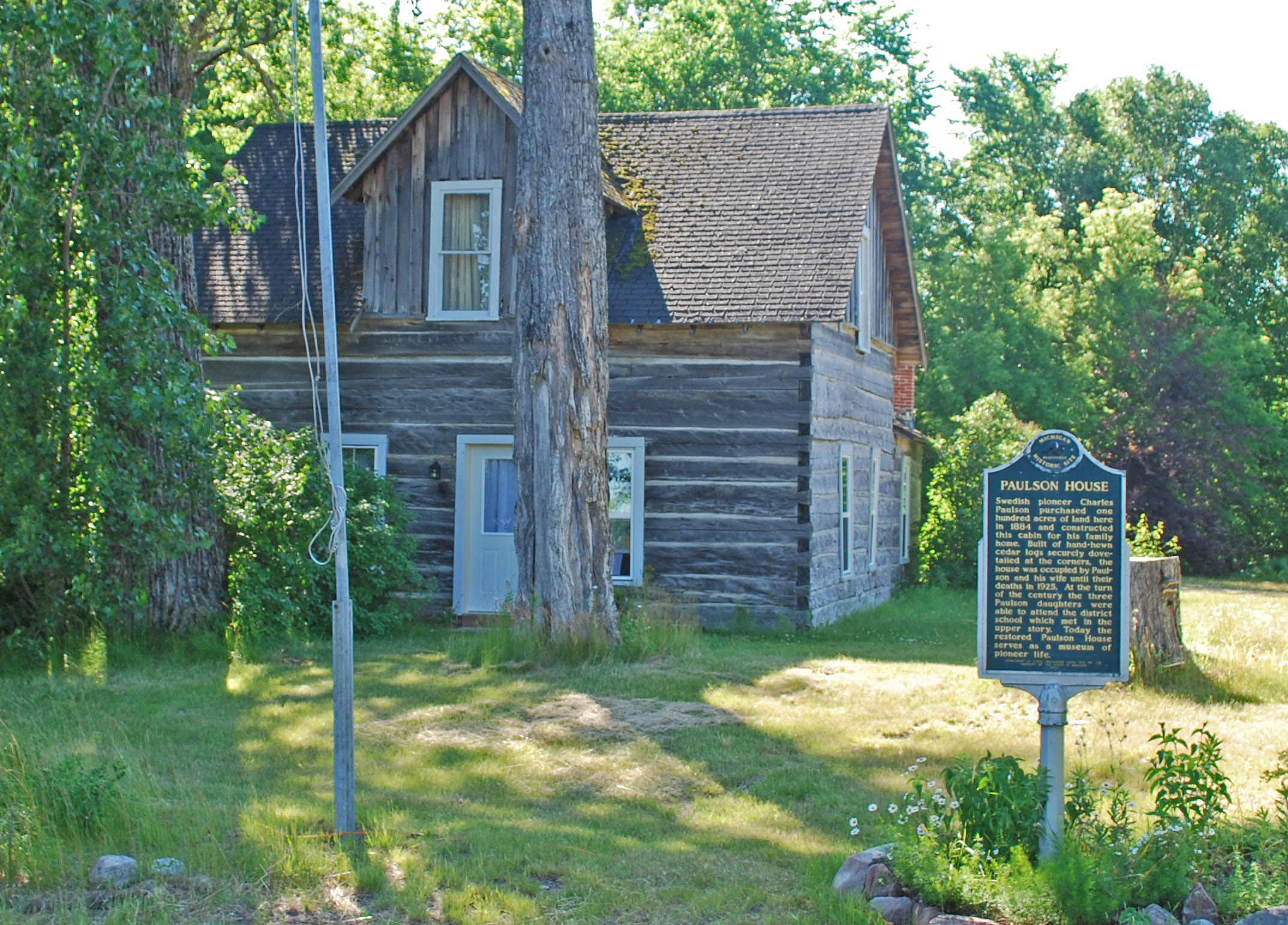
- Interactive map
- Nearest city: AuTrain, Michigan
- Coordinates: 46°24′25″N 86°51′1″W
- Area: less than one acre
- Built: 1883
- Architect: Paulson, Charles
- Architectural style: Log Cabin
- NRHP reference No.: 72000590

Significant dates
- Added to NRHP: November 9, 1972
- Designated MSHS: February 11, 1972

The Paulson House in Au Train, Michigan was built in 1883. It was listed on the National Register of Historic Places and designated a state of Michigan Historic site in 1972.

== History ==
The Paulson House was built in 1883 by Charles Paulson, a Swede who had worked as a miner in Ishpeming and Negaunee. Paulson homesteaded the surrounding area, growing cabbages. He also owned a local gravel pit. The upper floor of the cabin was used as a school room in the early part of the 20th century. Paulson and his wife lived in the cabin until their deaths in 1925.

One of Paulson's daughters continued to live in the house until her death in the 1930s. The Russell family lived in the house from the mid-1940s to the mid-1950s. The house was vacant for thirteen years until the early 1970s when it was extensively rehabilitated both inside and out.

The house is now a museum.

== Description ==
The Paulson House is a 1 1/2-story, side-gable, L-shaped house, constructed of cedar logs from 7 to 9 inches thick. The logs are dovetailed together at the corners, and held with iron spikes. The main section measures 25 feet by 29 feet; a single-story addition containing the kitchen measures 12 feet by 18 feet. The logs are V-notched, and the gables are covered with vertical siding. The interior of the house contains a kitchen, dining room, living room, and two bedrooms on the first floor. Three more and an overhead loft are located on the upper floor.
