= U.S. Route 41 in Michigan =

U.S. Highway in Michigan

US Highway 41
- US 41 highlighted in red

Route information
- Maintained by MDOT
- Length: 278.769 mi (448.635 km)
- Existed: November 11, 1926–present
- Tourist routes: UP Hidden Coast Recreational Heritage Trail; Lake Michigan Circle Tour; Lake Superior Circle Tour; Copper Country Trail National Scenic Byway and Pure Michigan Scenic Byway

Major junctions
- South end: US 41 at Wisconsin state line south of Menominee
- US 2 at Powers; M-35 between Escanaba and Gladstone; US 2 in Rapid River; M-28 in Harvey; M-35 in Negaunee; US 141 / M-28 near Covington; M-26 in Houghton
- North end: Cul-de-sac near Fort Wilkins Historic State Park in Copper Harbor

Location
- Country: United States
- State: Michigan
- Counties: Menominee, Delta, Alger, Marquette, Baraga, Houghton, Keweenaw

Highway system
- United States Numbered Highway System; List; Special; Divided; Michigan State Trunkline Highway System; Interstate; US; State; Byways
← M-40	→ Bus. US 41

US Highway 41 (US 41) is a part of the United States Numbered Highway System that runs from Miami, Florida, to the Upper Peninsula of the US state of Michigan. In Michigan, it is a state trunkline highway that enters the state via the Interstate Bridge between Marinette, Wisconsin, and Menominee, Michigan. The 278.769 miles (448.635 km) of US 41 that lie within Michigan serve as a major conduit. Most of the highway is listed on the National Highway System. Various sections are rural two-lane highway, urbanized four-lane divided expressway and the Copper Country Trail National Scenic Byway. The northernmost community along the highway is Copper Harbor at the tip of the Keweenaw Peninsula. The trunkline ends at a cul-de-sac east of Fort Wilkins State Park after serving the Central Upper Peninsula and Copper Country regions of Michigan.

US 41 passes through farm fields and forest lands, and along the Lake Superior shoreline. The highway is included in the Lake Superior Circle Tour and the Lake Michigan Circle Tour and passes through the Hiawatha National Forest and the Keweenaw National Historical Park. Historical landmarks along the trunkline include the Marquette Branch Prison, Peshekee River Bridge and the Quincy Mine. The highway is known for a number of historic bridges such as a lift bridge, the northernmost span in the state and a structure referred to as "one of Michigan's most important vehicular bridges" by the Michigan Department of Transportation (MDOT). Seven memorial highway designations have been applied to parts of the trunkline since 1917, one of them named for a Civil War general.

US 41 was first designated as a US Highway in 1926. A section of the highway originally served as part of Military Road, a connection between Fort Wilkins and Fort Howard during the Civil War. US 41 replaced the original M-15 designation of the highway which dated back to the formation of the Michigan state trunkline highway system. M-15 ran from Menominee through Marquette to Houghton and ended in Copper Harbor. Realignments and construction projects have expanded the highway to four lanes in Delta and Marquette counties and have created three business loops off the main highway.

== Route description ==
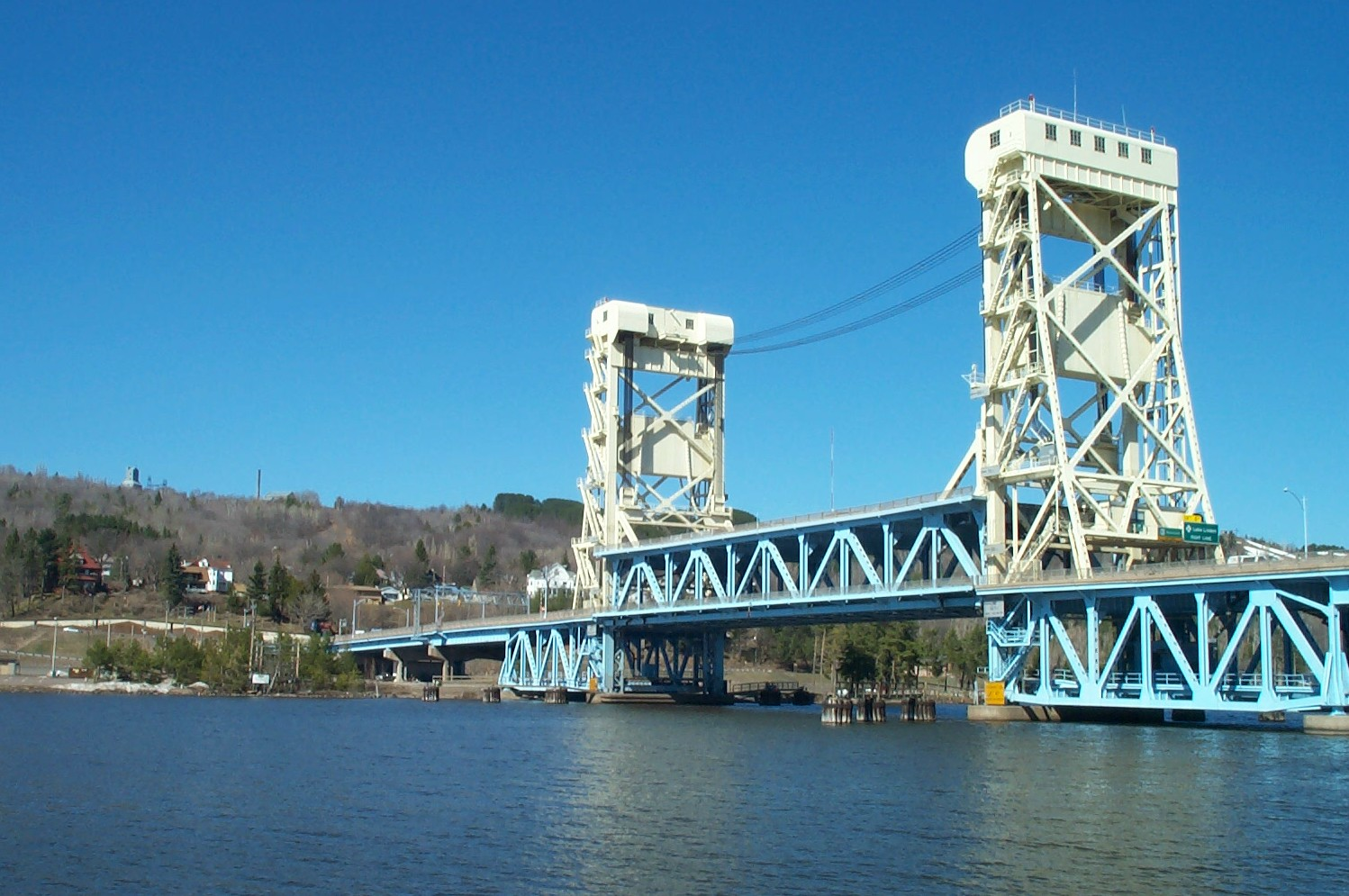
The Portage Lake Lift Bridge carries US 41/M-26 across the Keweenaw Waterway from Houghton to Hancock

US 41 is a major highway for Michigan traffic in the Upper Peninsula. The 278.769-mile (448.635 km) highway comprises mostly two lanes; it is undivided except for the sections that are concurrent with US 2 near Escanaba and M-28 near Marquette. US 41/M-28 is a four-lane expressway along the "Marquette Bypass", and segments of the highway in Delta and Marquette counties have four lanes. The route from the southern terminus to downtown Houghton is part of the National Highway System, a system of roadways considered important to the nation's economy, defense and mobility. Sections of the trunkline are on the Lake Superior and Lake Michigan circle tours.

=== Menominee to Rapid River ===
US 41 enters Michigan on the Interstate Bridge connecting Marinette, Wisconsin, and Menominee, Michigan. In the city of Menominee, US 41 follows 10th Avenue and 10th Street just west of downtown. The highway meets the southern terminus of M-35, with the Menominee-Marinette Airport to its west, and the waters of the Green Bay less than 1,000 feet (305 m) to the east, following 10th Street out of town. The trunkline runs north through rolling farmland in the central Menominee County communities of Wallace, Stephenson, and the twin communities of Carney and Nadeau. At Powers, US 41 joins with US 2; the two highways run concurrently and turn east toward Escanaba. US 2/US 41 crosses into the Hannahville Indian Community at the communities of Harris in Menominee County and Bark River in Delta County. The county line between the two communities marks the boundary between the Central and Eastern time zones.

Just west of downtown Escanaba, US 2/US 41 joins M-35 at the intersection of Ludington Street and Lincoln Road, the center of the Escanaba street grid. The trunkline enters Escanaba from the west on Ludington Street, turns north on Lincoln Road, and joins M-35. The combined highway then runs north adjacent to Little Bay de Noc using a four-lane divided highway to the city of Gladstone, where M-35 turns west along 4th Avenue North. US 2/US 41 continues on a four-lane expressway north to Rapid River at the end of Little Bay de Noc. There, US 2 turns east, and US 41 turns north and inland to cross the Upper Peninsula.

The section of US 41 between Menominee and Escanaba illustrates an anomaly in the highway routing: between these two cities M-35 is the shortest state trunkline highway. Under American Association of State Highway and Transportation Officials guidelines, US Highways are to follow the most direct path between two locations, but US 41 runs inland and M-35 goes more directly up the Lake Michigan shoreline. According to the 2007 MDOT state highway map, the US 41 routing runs for 65 miles (105 km) versus 55 miles (89 km) for M-35. The original map for the US Highway System shows US 41 continuing north from Powers on a direct line to Marquette. This routing would be more direct than the current US 41 routing via Escanaba and Rapid River, but has not been built.

=== Rapid River to Covington ===
This stretch of US 41 runs north through the western edge of the Hiawatha National Forest. At Trenary, US 41 turns northwest through the southwest corner of Alger County, crossing into Marquette County north of Kiva. M-94 follows US 41 for approximately 2 miles (3 km) near Skandia, before it turns westward to provide access to K. I. Sawyer, a former air force base. US 41 continues northerly into the Chocolay Township community of Harvey. It meets the eastern junction with M-28 in Harvey, and the two highways run concurrent for nearly 60 miles (97 km), during which they follow the Lake Superior Circle Tour.

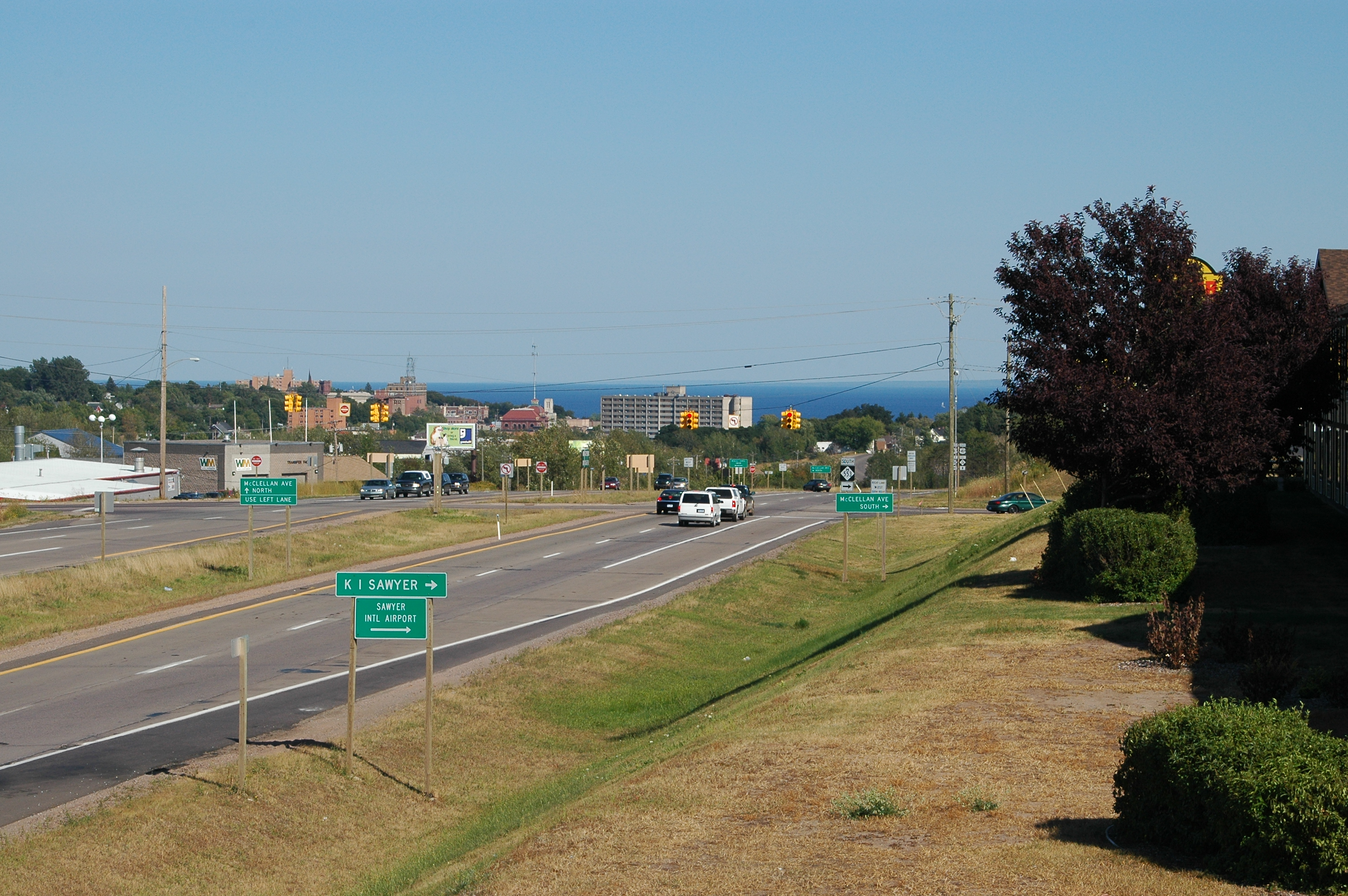
US 41/M-28 along the Marquette Bypass with Lake Superior in the background

US 41/M-28 runs north along the Lake Superior shoreline, passing the Marquette Branch Prison and crossing the Carp River before cresting Shiras Hill on the way into the city of Marquette, entering town on Front Street. South of downtown, the highway turns west on the Marquette Bypass, a four-lane expressway complete with two overpasses. The bypass moves traffic around the former routing of US 41/M-28 along Front and Washington streets, a routing that was used for Business US 41 (Bus. US 41) until 2005. West of Washington Street, US 41/M-28 follows a heavily trafficked business corridor. The 2006 average annual daily traffic (AADT, the yearly traffic count divided by 365) along this corridor ranged from 31,700 to 34,700 vehicles. US 41/M-28 climbs hilly terrain into the cities of Negaunee and Ishpeming, running west and slightly south. The two cities host Bus. M-28, which was once designated as ALT US 41 as well. Between the twin cities, US 41/M-28 skirts the shores of Teal Lake in Negaunee and then narrows to two lanes west of Ishpeming.

US 41/M-28 continues west through rural Marquette County and passes along the north shore of Lake Michigamme between Champion and Michigamme, crossing the Peshekee River. In eastern Baraga County, the highway runs along an isthmus between Lake George and Lake Ruth in the community of Three Lakes. Further west, US 41 meets the northern terminus of US 141, which marks the western junction with M-28 near Covington, and the end of the M-28 concurrency.

=== Covington to Copper Harbor ===
US 41 turns north solo from Covington, crossing the Sturgeon River, on the way to the historic sawmill town of Alberta. Henry Ford built the village to serve the sawmill in 1935. The Alberta mill supplied wood for Ford Motors until it was closed by Henry Ford II; the property was donated to Michigan Technological University (MTU) in 1954.

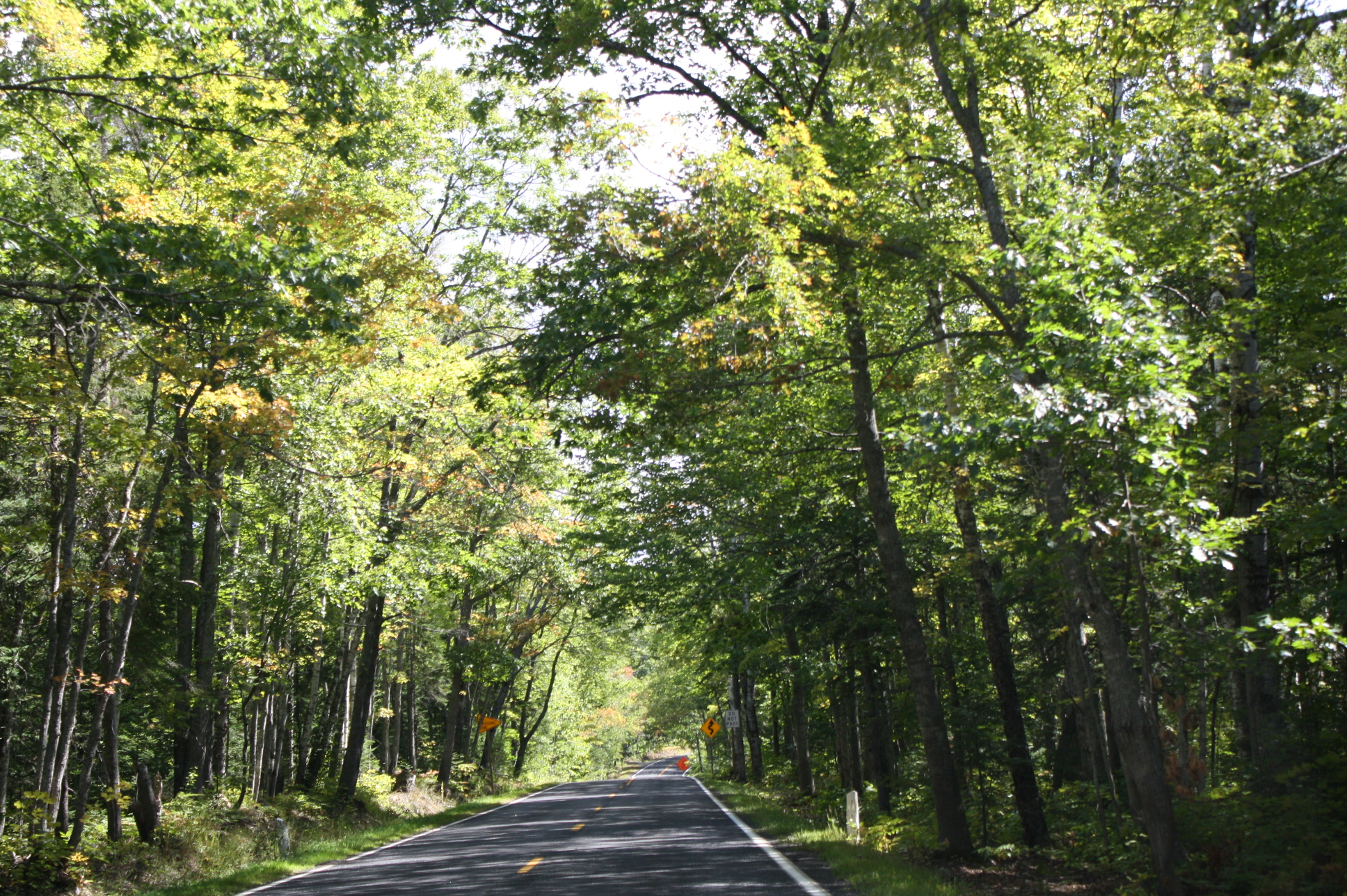
The "Covered Trail" south of Copper Harbor

Continuing north from Alberta, US 41 enters the town of L'Anse on the east side of Keweenaw Bay, rounding the bay to the town of Baraga. Both towns are a part of the Keweenaw Bay Indian Community. US 41 continues along the shores of the bay north into Houghton County, turning along Portage Lake near Chassell.

US 41 enters Houghton along Townsend Drive on the campus of MTU. After crossing the campus, it uses College Avenue into downtown. There, US 41 is split along the one-way pairing of Sheldon Avenue for northbound and Montezuma Avenue for southbound traffic. The two streets merge west of downtown at the southern end of the Portage Lake Lift Bridge. Downtown Houghton marks the start of the Copper Country Trail National Scenic Byway.

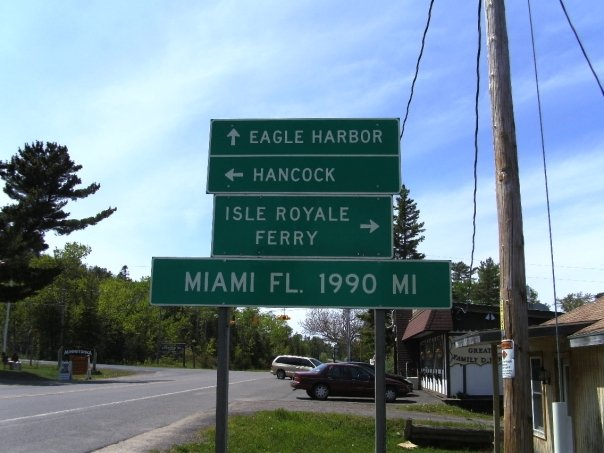
Mileage sign in Copper Harbor in 2009 showing distance to Miami

North of the lift bridge, US 41 turns west through the downtown of Hancock using the one-way pairing of Quincy Street northbound and Hancock Street southbound. The trunkline then follows Lincoln Drive after merging the two directions west of downtown. The highway continues up Quincy Hill and out of town, passing the Quincy Mine at the top of the hill. North of Hancock, US 41 passes the Houghton County Memorial Airport before reaching the towns of Calumet and Laurium. US 41 merges with M-26 in Calumet, and they follow the center of the Keweenaw Peninsula to the community of Phoenix. M-26 turns northwesterly in Phoenix to loop through Eagle River and Eagle Harbor, while US 41 turns easterly through the rural communities of Central and Delaware. The two highways meet one last time in Copper Harbor where M-26 ends. US 41 turns east on Gratiot Street to pass through town towards Fort Wilkins State Park. A mileage sign in Copper Harbor gives the distance down US 41 to Miami, Florida, as 1,990 miles (3,203 km). The roadway continues east, crossing Fanny Hooe Creek near the state park. Past the park entrance, US 41 ends at a cul-de-sac, marked by a large wooden sign.

== History ==
There are two major eras of the history of US 41. The first dates back to the Civil War and a wagon road built by the federal government. The Military Road was built to connect the Copper Country with Wisconsin. After the establishment of the state trunkline highway system, a segment of the Military Road was used for M-15, the predecessor of US 41.

=== Military Road ===
The northernmost section of the modern US 41 between Houghton and Copper Harbor originated in the 19th century as the Military Road. The road was one of 13 roads built between 1817 and 1864 by the federal government. Construction of the road was proposed as early as two years after the US acquired the last tracts of land in the Upper Peninsula. Congress asked Secretary of War William Wilkins for funding to build such a road in 1844, since the area depended on a land connection to Green Bay, Wisconsin, for up to six months a year for supplies and mail. The estimate for a 220-mile-long (350 km), 33-foot-wide (10 m) crude road was $37,400 (equivalent to $1,200,000 in 2024). The matter died until 1848 when the Michigan Legislature petitioned Congress for an appropriation to build to connect Green Bay to the Keweenaw Bay. The appeal went unfulfilled by the government, but private groups stepped in. Mail service was available overland once a month during the winter from Green Bay. In 1857, the Legislature enacted a law to provide a road from Eagle Harbor south to Ontonagon. This road was extended south to the state line pursuant to two laws in 1859.

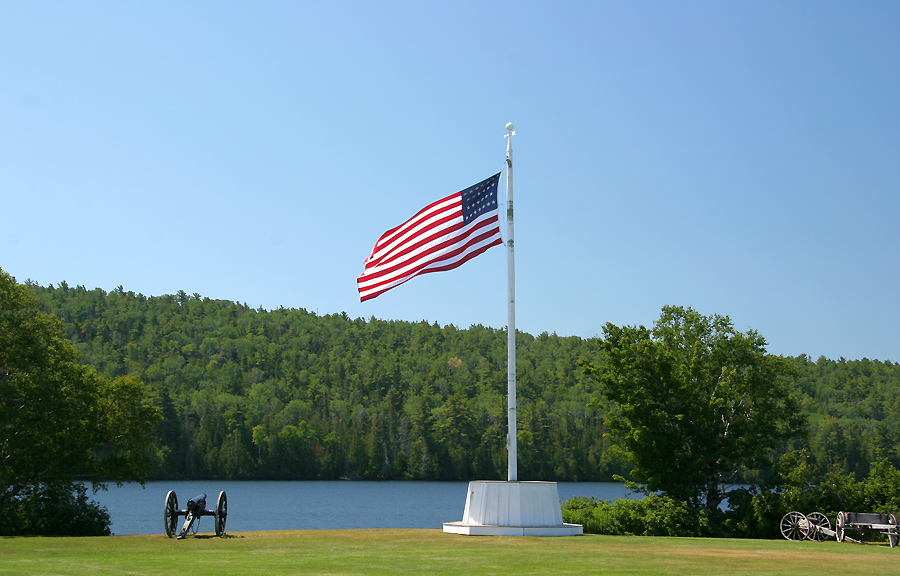
The view of Lake Fanny Hooe at Fort Wilkins

The Civil War refocused discussions about the road. There were fears that Great Britain would enter on the side of the Confederacy during the early days of the war. British troops were as close to Michigan as Ontario, and more than half of the copper used in the US came from mines along the proposed roadway. Control of the area could have been established by seizing the Soo Locks at Sault Ste. Marie, severing communication lines through the Great Lakes. If the locks fell to an enemy force, no troops or supplies could be moved to the Copper Country except by land. The road was also needed during the five or six months of the year that transportation on the Great Lakes was barred by ice or stormy weather.

Congress passed a law to build a military wagon road on March 3, 1863, from Fort Wilkins to Houghton and then south to the state line. The road was laid out in 1864 following what is today M-26 between Copper Harbor and Phoenix, US 41 south to Houghton, M-26 south to Winona and Federal Forest Highway 16 (FFH-16) to the state line. Wisconsin authorities ran the road along what is now Highway 29 between Green Bay and Shawano and Highway 55 north to the state line. Military Road would connect Fort Wilkins with Fort Howard near Green Bay.

The laws setting up the construction of the Military Road established a five-year deadline for construction. The war removed laborers in mining, lumbering and shipping as well as soldiers from the available workforce, and Congress extended the deadline an additional 21 months in June 1868. A second extension was granted in May 1870. The Wisconsin section of the highway was completed on June 20, 1870. The Houghton County segment was finished in January 1871. The Keweenaw County section was completed by August 1871. A third and final extension on the deadline was needed in April 1872, and the roadway was completed south to the state line in September 1873, shifting the southern segment in the Upper Peninsula west to the modern US 45 corridor in place of the FFH-16 alignment.

In payment for the completion of the road, close to 221,000 acres (89,000 ha) were awarded by the federal government to the corporation, including some 174,000 acres (70,000 ha) to Dr James Ayer of Lowell, Massachusetts, for his investments in the company. Most of the remaining land grants went to the company behind the Portage Lake Canal near Houghton and Hancock. Ayer's holdings were controlled by the trustees of his estate after his death in July 1878. A few thousand acres were sold over time, and the trustees benefitted from the sale of timber and the mineral rights. The profits had been exhausted by 1921, and the remaining tracts were sold to a lumberman from Grand Rapids for $2.3 million (equivalent to $31.9 million in 2024).

Railroads built near the Military Road attracted more traffic than the road. The road was not well built; except in the winter when the weather froze the ground or covered it in snow, the road was barely passable. Most of the 140-mile (225 km) highway was converted into a state trunkline between 1913 and 1920, mostly as M-15 or M-26. Remnants of the original Military Road can be found as backwoods trails labeled "Old Military Road" on maps, or as a street in Ripley near Hancock called "Military Road".

=== State trunkline ===
The first state trunkline highway designated along the path of the modern US 41 was M-15, in use as far back as 1919. The 1925 draft plan for the establishment of the US Highway System would have replaced parts of M-15 with three different US Highways. Between Menominee and Powers, M-15 was to become US 41. East of Powers to Rapid River, the trunkline would have been US 2. The next segment between Rapid River and Humboldt was planned as US 102 while the remainder north to Copper Harbor was not initially planned as a part of the new highway system. When the system was created on November 11, 1926, US 41 was the only US Highway routed along the alignment of M-15, and US 41 extended north to Copper Harbor. The original map showed US 41 following an unbuilt alignment between Powers and Marquette. The new US 41 designation was instead routed to follow the former M-15.

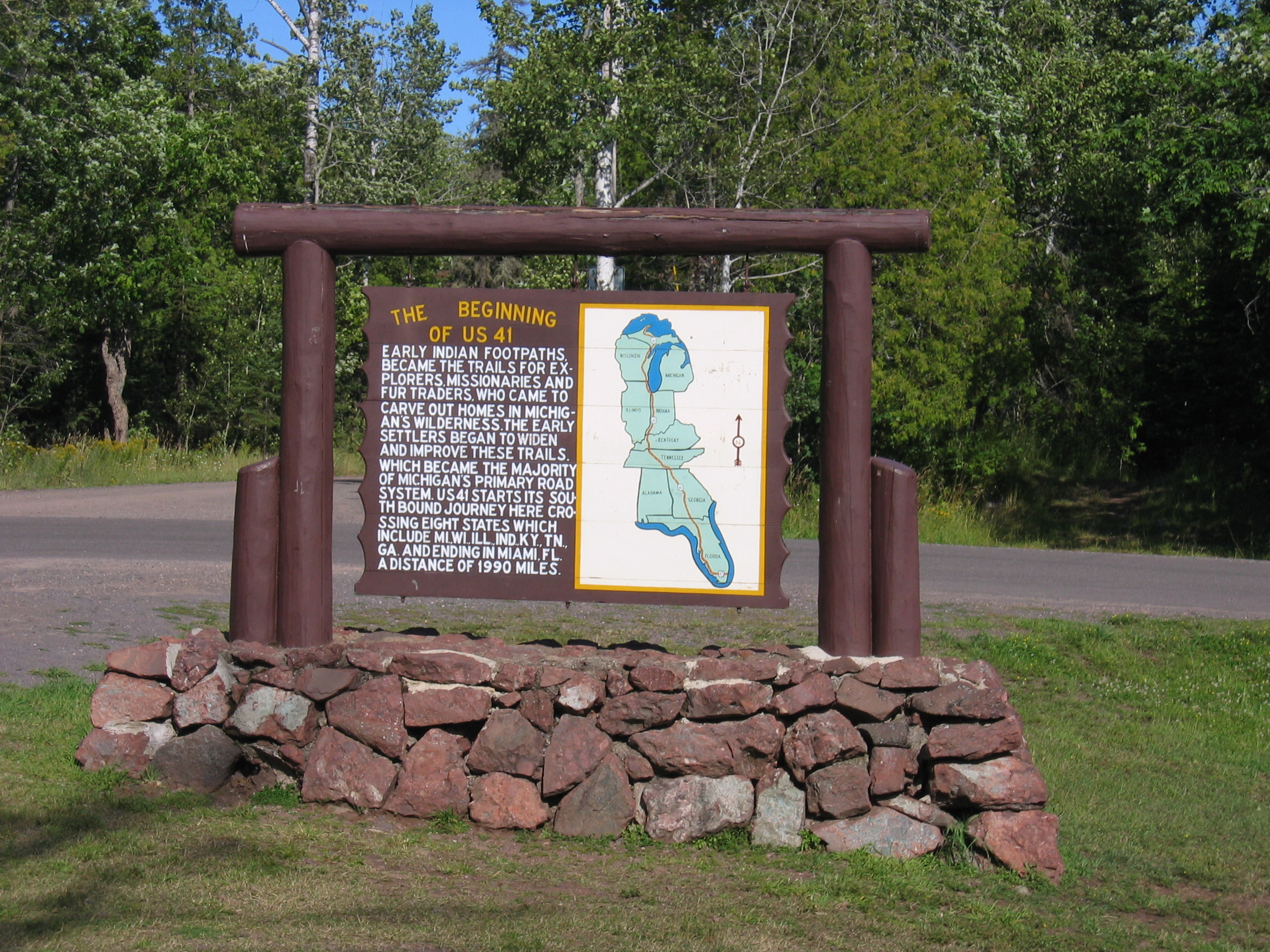
Sign marking northern terminus, east of Copper Harbor

The 1927 edition of the official Michigan highway service map was the first to show M-28 extended along US 41 into Marquette County and east over the former M-25 through Munising and Newberry, before ending in downtown Sault Ste. Marie. At Negaunee, M-28 was shown along the previous routing of M-15 between Negaunee and Marquette for 10 miles (16 km), while US 41 ran along a portion of M-35. This southern loop routing of M-28 lasted until approximately 1936, when M-28 was displayed as concurrent with US 41. The former route is now Marquette County Road 492 (CR 492). Around 1930, the northern terminus of US 41 was extended east from Copper Harbor to Fort Wilkins State Park. Another realignment shown in 1937 marked the transfer of US 41/M-28 out of downtown Ishpeming and Negaunee. This former routing later became Bus. M-28. The highway was realigned due north between Rapid River and Trenary according to the 1938 service map. US 41 was completely paved in 1951. The final two sections to be paved were in Baraga County and Keweenaw County.

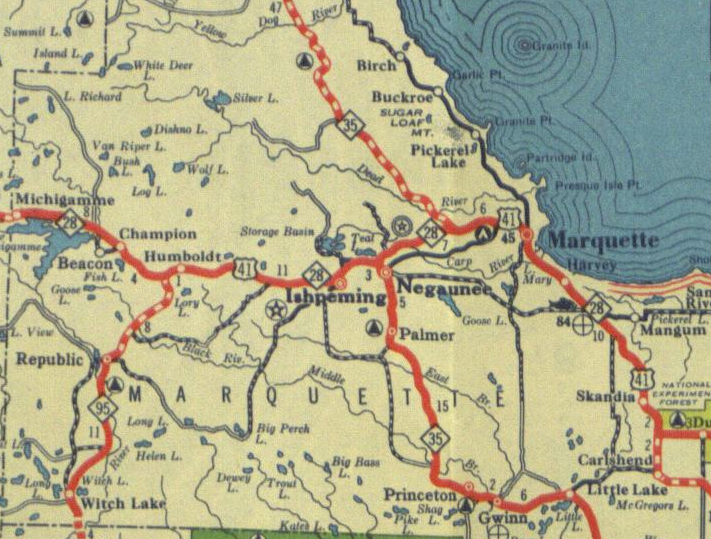
This December 1, 1937, MSHD map was the first to show the relocated US 41/M-28 near Teal Lake in Marquette County

M-35 was routed concurrently with US 41 between Negaunee and Baraga by 1953. This extra concurrency connected the two previously disconnected segments of M-35. The Portage Lake Bridge opened in 1959 at a cost of $13 million (equivalent to $107 million in 2024).

The Marquette Bypass was opened in November 1963 as a four-lane expressway south of downtown Marquette at a cost of $1.7 million (equivalent to $133 million in 2024). Washington and Front streets in Marquette were redesignated as Bus. US 41 at this time. While the expressway was being built, a large vein of jasper exposed, and gifts fashioned from the mineral were presented to local and state politicians. A set of cufflinks to be given to President John F. Kennedy was never presented because he was killed in Dallas just hours after the Marquette Bypass opened to traffic.

The concurrency with M-35 through Marquette and Baraga counties was removed in January 1969. M-35 west of Baraga was designated as a new M-38 and M-35 was shortened to its current northern terminus. Another expressway section of US 41 was denoted along US 2/US 41 between Gladstone and Rapid River in 1972. A Bus. M-28 designation was added to Bus. US 41 on the MDOT map in 1975, making it similar to the former Bus. US 41/Bus. M-28 designation along Bus. M-28 in Ishpeming and Negaunee. This second designation was removed by 1982.

US 41 in the Copper Country was recognized on September 26, 1995, as the state's first scenic heritage route (now a Pure Michigan Byway). The first section given the designation ran from Central to Copper Harbor. The designation was extended south to Mohawk in 2002 and Houghton in 2004. On September 22, 2005, US 41 north of Houghton was designated the Copper Country Trail of the National Scenic Byways program. This section of the highway was named one of Country magazine's 10 "Best Scenic Roads in America" in November 2014.

Construction started on November 1, 2004, to replace the Interstate Bridge carrying US 41 between Marinette, Wisconsin, and Menominee. The project wrapped up on November 22, 2005, when the new bridge opened to traffic. A ribbon-cutting ceremony was held on December 3, 2005, to celebrate the replacement of the 1929 structure. In 2011, MDOT raised the speed limit along the expressway section in Delta County to 65 mph (105 km/h), although truck traffic remained set at 55 mph (89 km/h) until 2017.

=== Marquette roundabout ===
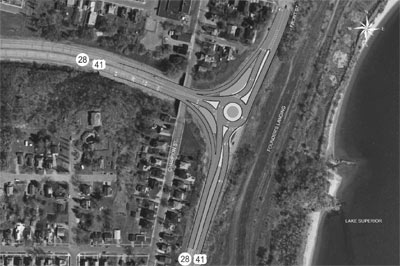
Diagram of the roundabout in Marquette as proposed

MDOT unveiled plans on March 31, 2009, to rebuild the intersection between Front Street and the eastern end of the Marquette Bypass during 2010 as a roundabout, replacing several intersecting roadways that connect the north and south sections of Front Street with US 41/M-28 through the existing intersection. The previous intersection configuration dated back to November 1963. It had been labeled as "dangerous and [causing] significant traffic delays" by the designers of the replacement. A traffic study concluded in 2007 that the intersection would need either the roundabout or a traffic signal with several turning lanes to accommodate the traffic needs in the area. MDOT decided in favor of a two-lane, 150-foot-wide (46 m) roundabout retaining the right-turn lanes from the previous intersection layout. These lanes will be used by right-turning traffic to bypass the circle at the center of the intersection.

MDOT engineers touted the constant-flowing nature of the design as a benefit to the new intersection, and city planners promoted the enhanced safety aspects of the project. Both parties stated the planned intersection was less expensive than a conventional stop light. Residents have expressed concerns about snow plowing and truck traffic in the intersection. The designers consulted officials of Avon, Colorado, where several roundabouts are situated in a location that averages over 300 inches (760 cm) of annual snowfall. Designers planned the size of the new intersection to accommodate truck traffic. MDOT has stated that many of the concerns expressed are due to misconceptions and unfounded assumptions about the design. The department held an informational meeting with the residents on April 15, 2010, before construction began. Topics ranged from emergency vehicles, plowing, trucks, accidents and detour plans.

Construction started on the project in May. One lane of traffic in each direction was maintained for US 41/M-28. Motorists seeking access to downtown were detoured via Grove Street or Lakeshore Boulevard. The Downtown Development Authority had plans to purchase billboards helping to direct customers to the downtown shopping district. A section of the intersection was opened in July to traffic from the south that turns west. The lanes northbound into downtown were opened in the beginning of August, and the city held a ribbon cutting ceremony on August 19, 2010. The remaining lanes were opened the next day. To address residents' concerns about truck traffic through the intersection, the mayor noted that a large lumber truck successfully navigated the roundabout after the ribbon was cut. "It just cruised right around and through. All of these people who are wondering is it big enough, can you get a firetruck on it? Yes, you can," stated Mayor John Kivela.

=== Keweenaw Bay relocation ===
In 2010, officials from MDOT announced a $2.3 million project to move a 1.6-mile-long (2.6 km) section of US 41 about 100 feet (30 m) inland along a set of cliffs five miles (8.0 km) north of Baraga. The sandstone cliffs were eroding next to Keweenaw Bay, and a 2007 study from MTU said that action at that time would be needed within a decade. The department had funding available in 2010 and decided to take on the project at the time. Local homes were not affected by the project, although the state had to purchase property to accommodate the shift. A parallel rail line was removed in the project. Rail service from Baraga to Chassell has been suspended for several years, and the right-of-way had been overgrown with brush; the rails will be replaced if needed in the future. The project was completed in October 2010.

== Historic bridges ==
Seven bridges along the US 41 corridor have been recognized for their historic character by various organizations. Six of the seven are listed on MDOT's Historic Bridge Inventory; the seventh not listed by MDOT is on the National Register of Historic Places (NRHP) and Michigan's State Register of Historic Sites (SRHS) along with four of the others.

=== Portage Lake Lift Bridge ===
The Portage Lake Lift Bridge connects the cities of Hancock and Houghton by crossing over the Portage Waterway, an arm of Portage Lake that cuts across the Keweenaw Peninsula. A canal links the final several miles of the lake arm to Lake Superior to the northwest.

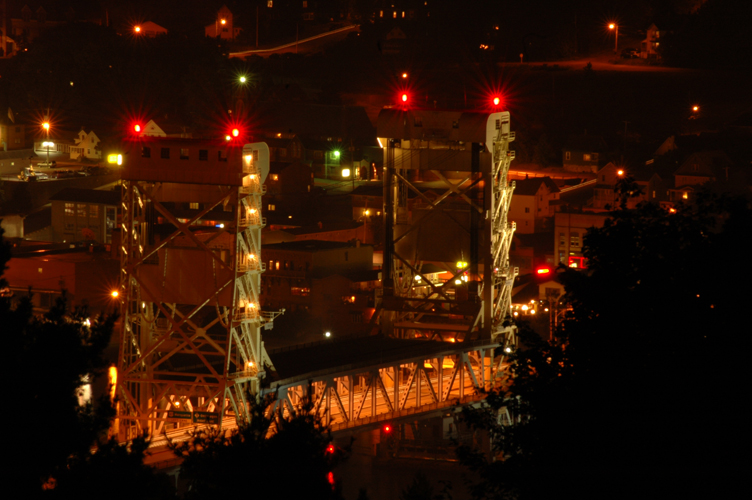
The Portage Lake Lift Bridge at night from north of Hancock

This lift bridge features a middle section capable of being raised from a low point of 4 feet (1.2 m) of clearance over the water to a clearance of 32 feet (9.8 m) to allow boats to pass underneath. The Portage Lake Lift Bridge is the widest and heaviest double-decked vertical lift bridge in the world. The lower deck of the span was originally open to rail traffic when it was built in 1959, but this level is now closed to trains and is used in the winter for snowmobile traffic.

The lift bridge is the last of several previous crossings over the waterway. A wooden swing bridge was built in 1875. A newer, iron swing bridge was built in 1897; this structure was partially destroyed in 1905 when it was struck by a ship. This second crossing was rebuilt in 1906 and remained in service until the lift bridge was opened in December 1959. The current bridge was last used for railroad traffic in the summer of 1982, after the Soo Line rail lines north of Houghton were abandoned starting in 1976. The middle section is left in an intermediate position for the warmer nine months of the year so that vehicle traffic can use the lower deck of the lift span and pleasure craft can pass under the bridge. In the winter, the lift span is lowered so snowmobiles and skiers can use the lower deck while cars and trucks use the upper deck.

=== Interstate Bridge ===
The Interstate Bridge was built in 1929 for $700,000 (equivalent to $5.7 million in 2024) to carry US 41 over the Menominee River at the state line. This span replaced a series of bridges built to connect Marinette, Wisconsin, and Menominee, Michigan, across the river. The first bridge was built in 1865 with a second built in 1872 that was replaced in 1929 with the third bridge. This third crossing was 850 feet (259 m) in length, consisting of eleven 80-foot (24 m) spans. The bridge was rehabilitated in 1970 in a project that included widening the deck and replacing the guard rails. Another construction project in 1999 repaired the Michigan side and the slough bridge portion of the Wisconsin side of the structure; the project closed the bridge for six months.

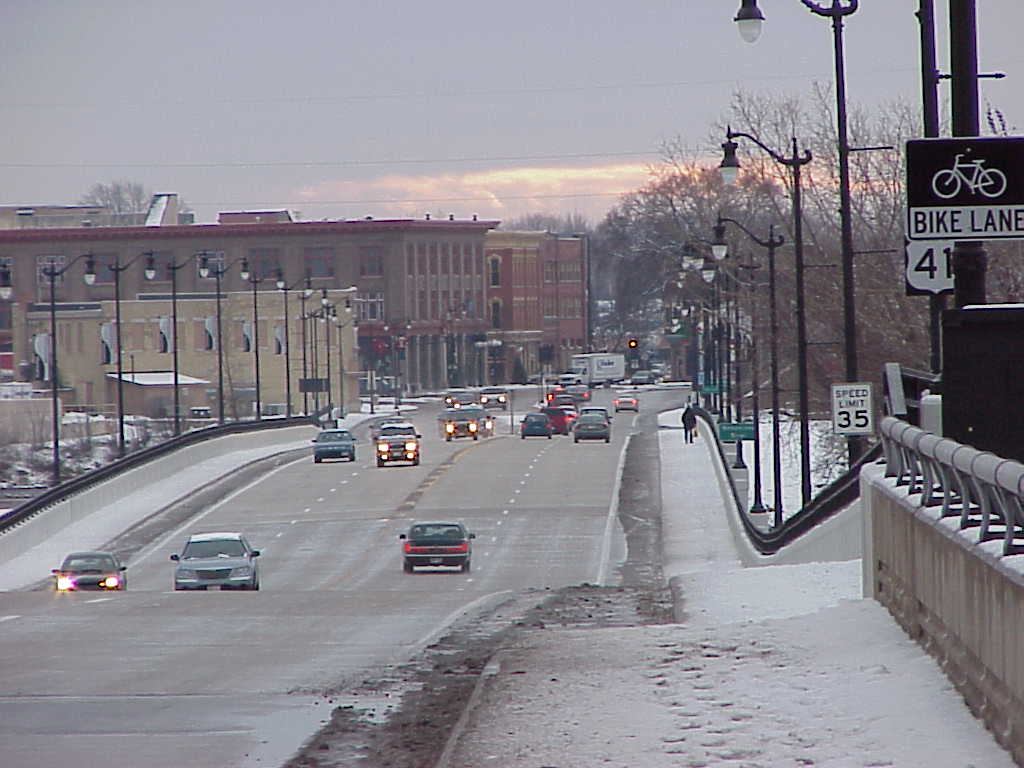
The Interstate Bridge the day after it reopened to traffic in November 2005

The Interstate Bridge was completely replaced starting on November 1, 2004, in a joint project between the MDOT and the Wisconsin Department of Transportation. The 13-month project was budgeted to cost $6.45 million (equivalent to $10.2 million in 2024). Demolition started in the center of the crossing, sawing the deck into pieces for disposal. This reconstruction was completed ahead of schedule, and the span reopened on November 22, 2005. The project completely replaced the bridge above the water line with wider traffic lanes, a new bicycle lane and wider sidewalks. Images of wild rice were sculpted into the concrete because "Menominee" in the local Menominee language means "wild rice". These sculptures were added to the other decorative elements placed on the new bridge including the railings and light poles. The new Interstate Bridge was dedicated on December 3, 2005, in a ribbon-cutting ceremony that replicated the 1930 ceremony on the previous crossing.

=== NRHP-listed bridges ===
Five other bridges are listed on the NRHP and the Michigan SRHS as well as on the MDOT Historic Bridge Inventory. The first is in Limestone Township in Alger County. Designated Trunk Line Bridge No. 264, it carries King Road across the Whitefish River along a former alignment of US 41 built in 1919. Constructed of two 35-foot (11 m) through girders, the span continues to carry traffic although it is no longer on a state trunkline highway.

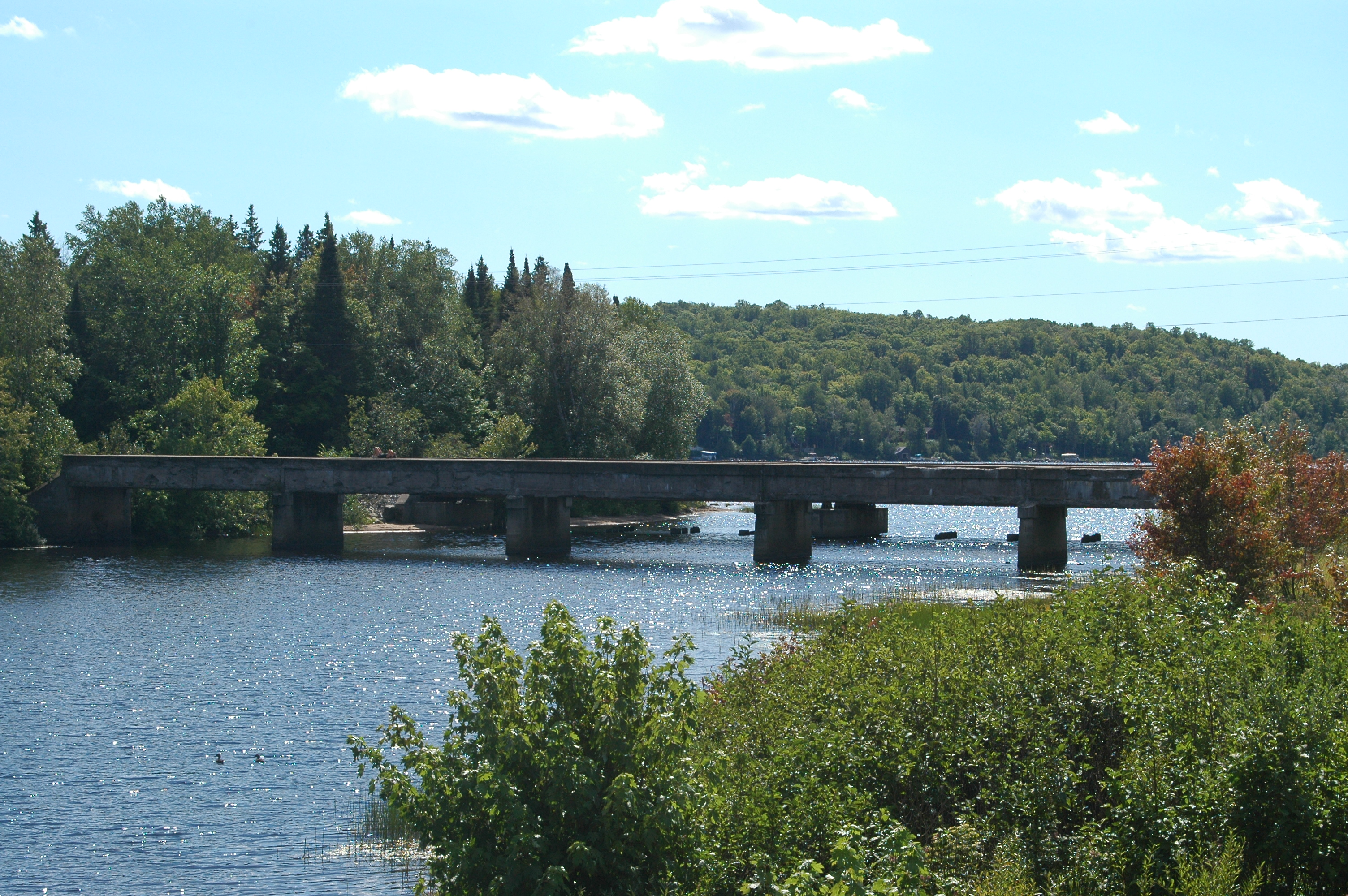
Abandoned Peshekee River Bridge in Michigamme Township

Drivers cannot use the Peshekee River Bridge south of US 41/M-28 in western Marquette County's Michigamme Township. The structure was listed on the National Register of Historic Places in 1999 for its engineering and architectural significance. MDOT has listed it on their Historic Bridge Inventory as "one of Michigan's most important vehicular bridges". It was the first bridge designed by the Michigan State Highway Department (MSHD), the forerunner to MDOT, in 1914. As the first crossing, it was designated "Trunk Line Bridge No. 1" and served as the prototype for hundreds of similar concrete through-girder bridges built in the state before the design fell out of favor in 1930. It was bypassed by a new structure built over the Peshekee River for US 41/M-28 and subsequently abandoned as a roadway, deteriorating in a county park.

Another abandoned bridge is now privately owned and in use at the mouth of the Backwater Creek on the Keweenaw Bay near L'Anse. The span was constructed in 1918 for $4,536 (equivalent to $62,616 in 2024). It is an 80-foot (24 m) Warren truss design now situated on private property. This abandoned bridge was listed on the National Register in 1999.

One bridge still in use crosses the Sturgeon River in Baraga County, known locally as the Canyon Falls Bridge. The structure was completed in 1948 as a steel arch bridge to span the river near the falls as part of a reconstruction project of US 41 between Ishpeming and L'Anse. The crossing has a main span of 128 feet (39 m) flanked by two 52-foot (16 m) approach spans.

The last historic bridge on US 41 is located near the northern terminus east of Copper Harbor. The Fanny Hooe Creek crossing was listed on the NRHP in 1999, but as of 2012, MDOT has not included the structure on its inventory of historic bridges online. The creek crossing is just west of the Fort Wilkins State Park entrance. MSHD and the Keweenaw County Road Commission designed and built the span in 1927–28 for $8,132 (equivalent to $117,019 in 2024). The bridge is unique for its stonework decoration on the 25-foot (8 m) span over the creek. This stonework includes fieldstones not usually associated with Michigan highway bridges. The crossing has remained in service since construction without alteration.

== Memorial designations ==
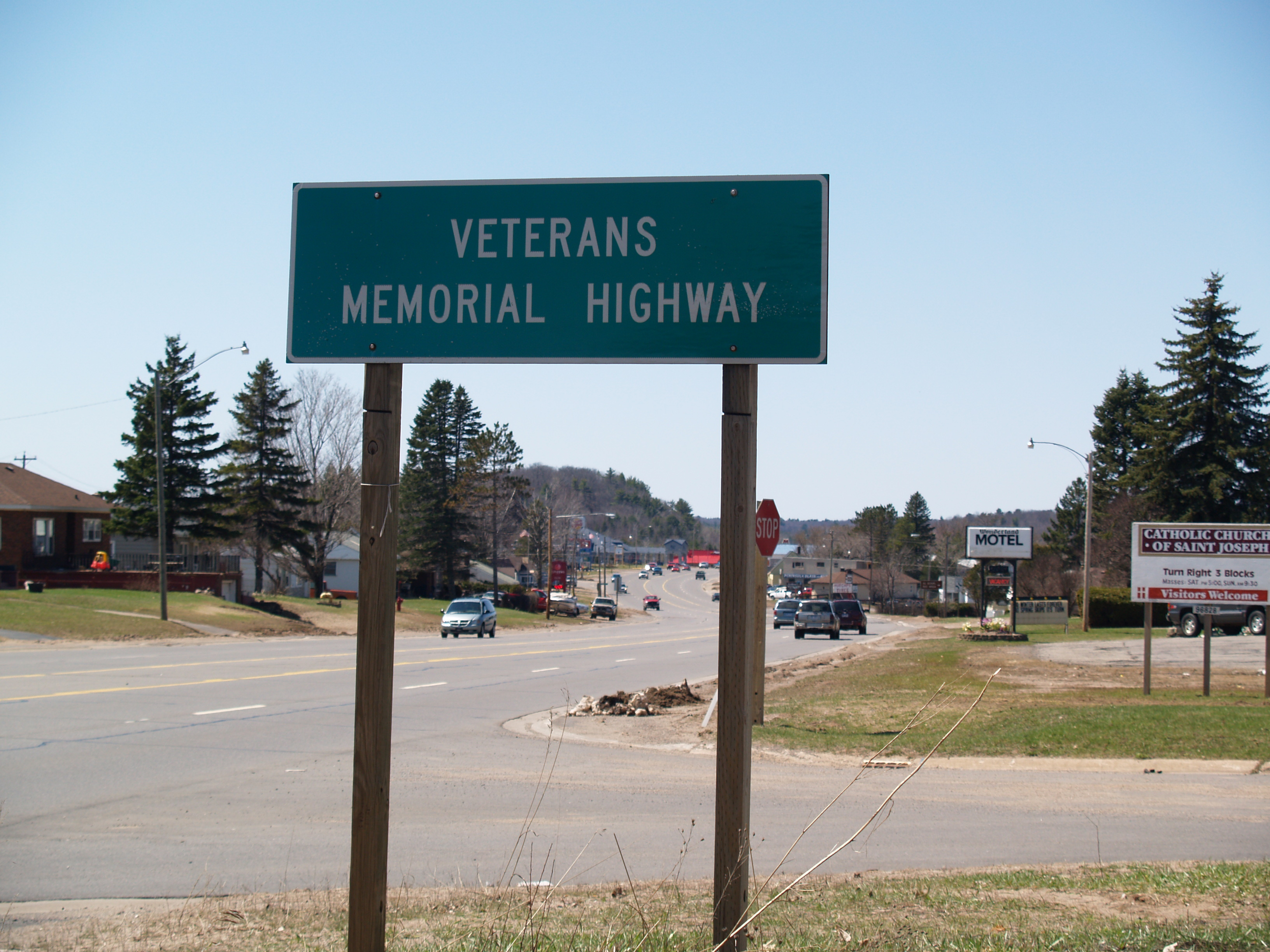
Signage for the Veterans Memorial Highway just west of the Ishpeming city line

Seven memorial designations have been applied to sections of US 41. Some of these designations follow other highways that run concurrently with US 41. Most of the designations are no longer in use, but the Jacobetti and Veterans memorial highways still have signage posted on the side of the road.

The Great Lakes Automobile Route was established in 1917 by the Upper Peninsula Development Bureau. A predecessor of the Great Lakes Circle Tours years later, the route followed "... a circular journey along the banks of lakes Michigan and Superior and Green Bay ..." This route followed the modern US 41 from the M-28 junction in Harvey to Copper Harbor. A branch of the route followed US 2/US 41 between Powers and Rapid River. The name fell out of use before its first anniversary because of World War I. The route was originally intended to entice motorists to drive around Lake Michigan; the side trips to Lake Superior distracted from this mission.

Sheridan Road was created in the early 20th century connecting Chicago with Fort Sheridan north of the city. Both the road and the fort were named in honor of Philip Sheridan, Union general during the Civil War. Sheridan, who served as colonel of the 2nd Michigan Cavalry in 1862, was later promoted to the rank of major general during the war. The Greater Sheridan Road Association started to promote an extension of the road south to St. Louis and north through Wisconsin and Michigan to end at Fort Wilkins in Copper Harbor by 1922. The roadway followed US 41's predecessor, M-15, and included numerous road signs bearing Sheridan's silhouette mounted on his horse Rienzi. Towns along the way were encouraged to rename city streets as Sheridan Road on Labor Day 1923. The road was promoted until the Great Depression in the 1930s. All that remains are signs in Menominee noting that First Street was once Sheridan Road. A nearly 1½ mile segment of roadway running close to the Little Bay de Noc shoreline on the north side of Escanaba is another remnant of the effort.

The Townsend National Highway was named for Charles E. Townsend, a former congressman and senator from Michigan. As a senator, he introduced the federal highway aid bill in 1919. The Michigan Good Roads Association promoted a highway in his name between Mobile, Alabama, and Michigan. The Michigan segment followed a number of highways through the two peninsulas, including the modern US 41 between Harvey and Calumet. Only Townsend Drive in Houghton retains the name in part.

Memory Lane was created in 1947 along US 41 in Baraga. The local Lions Club planted over 100 red maple trees at the recommendation of a state highway department forester to honor the veterans of World War I and World War II.

The Amvets Memorial Drive designation was created for the section of US 2/US 41/M-35 between the northern Escanaba city limits and CR 426 in Delta County. The American Veterans (AMVETS) organization in Michigan petitioned the Michigan Legislature to grant this designation which was granted under Public Act 144 in 1959.

The D. J. Jacobetti Memorial Highway follows the segment of US 41 concurrent with M-28 between Harvey and the Ishpeming–Negaunee city limits in Marquette County. The designation was created in 1986 and continues east along M-28 to honor the longest serving member of the Michigan Legislature, elected to a record 21 terms before his death in 1994.

A section of US 41 is one of six unrelated Veterans Memorial Highway designations in Michigan. The Upper Peninsula designation follows the western end of M-28, including the section of US 41 between Ishpeming and Covington. This memorial was created in Public Act 10 of 2003 and dedicated on Memorial Day in 2004.

== Major intersections ==
County	Location	mi	km	Destinations	Notes
Menominee River		0.000	0.000	US 41 south / LMCT south – Marinette, Green Bay	Continuation into Wisconsin
Menominee River		0.000	0.000	Interstate Bridge	
Menominee	Menominee	2.558	4.117	M-35 north / LMCT north – Escanaba	Northern end of LMCT concurrency; southern terminus of M-35
Menominee	Wallace	15.820	25.460	G-08 west – Wausaukee	Eastern terminus of G-08
Menominee	Stephenson	21.405	34.448	G-12 – Cedar River	
Menominee	Carney	34.606	55.693	G-18 west – Beecher, Pembine	Eastern terminus of G-18
Menominee	Powers	42.277	68.038	US 2 west – Iron Mountain	Western end of US 2 concurrency
Delta	Bark River	55.152	88.759	M-69 west – Sagola	Eastern terminus of M-69
Delta	Escanaba	64.263	103.421	M-35 south / LMCT south – Menominee	Southern end of M-35 concurrency; southern end of LMCT concurrency
Delta	Gladstone	71.271	114.700	CR 426 west – Arnold	
Delta	Gladstone	72.681	116.969	M-35 north – Gwinn	Northern end of M-35 concurrency
Delta	Masonville Township	78.594	126.485	CR 186 west – Brampton	Former M-186
Delta	Rapid River	78.869	126.927	US 2 east / LMCT – Manistique	Eastern end of US 2 concurrency; northern end of LMCT concurrency
Alger	Trenary	97.647	157.148	M-67 north – Chatham	Southern terminus of M-67
Marquette	Skandia	113.426	182.541	M-94 east – Munising	Southern end of M-94 concurrency
Marquette	Skandia	114.492	184.257	M-94 west – K.I. Sawyer	Northern end of M-94 concurrency
Marquette	Harvey	125.304	201.657	M-28 east / LSCT east – Munising	Eastern end of M-28 concurrency; eastern end of LSCT concurrency
Marquette	Marquette	129.555	208.499	Front Street – Downtown Marquette	Eastern terminus of former Bus. US 41
Marquette	Marquette	130.917	210.690	M-553 south (McClellan Avenue) – Gwinn	Northern terminus of M-553
Marquette	Marquette	131.299	211.305	Washington Street – Downtown Marquette	Western terminus of former Bus. US 41; no access from westbound Washington Street to eastbound US 41/M-28
Marquette	Marquette Township	132.743	213.629	CR 492 west	
Marquette	Negaunee Township	137.389	221.106	M-35 south – Palmer	Northern terminus of M-35
Marquette	Negaunee	140.272	225.746	CR 492 east (Maas Street) – Marquette	Former routing of M-28 along Marquette–Negaunee Road
Marquette	Negaunee	141.014	226.940	Bus. M-28 – Negaunee	Eastern terminus of Bus. M-28
Marquette	Ishpeming	144.615	232.735	Bus. M-28 (Lakeshore Drive) – Ishpeming	Western terminus of Bus. M-28
Marquette	Humboldt Township	156.302	251.544	M-95 south – Republic, Iron Mountain	Northern terminus of M-95
Baraga	Covington	184.745	297.318	US 141 south / M-28 west – Crystal Falls, Wakefield, Duluth, MN	Western end of M-28 concurrency; northern terminus of US 141
Baraga	Baraga	201.689	324.587	M-38 west – Ontonagon	Eastern terminus of M-38
Houghton	Houghton	228.356	367.503	M-26 south / LSCT – Ontonagon	Southern end of M-26 concurrency across Portage Lake Lift Bridge; LSCT follows M-26 westward and US 41 northward; southern end of Copper Country Trail National Scenic Byway
Houghton	Hancock	228.632	367.948	M-26 north / LSCT – Lake Linden	Northern end of M-26 concurrency
Houghton	Hancock	228.732	368.108	M-203 north / LSCT – McLain State Park, Calumet	Southern terminus of M-203; a loop route of the LSCT branches off along M-203
Houghton	Calumet	242.222	389.819	M-26 south / LSCT – Lake Linden	Southern end of M-26 concurrency
Houghton	Calumet	242.829	390.795	M-203 south / LSCT – McLain State Park, Hancock	Northern terminus of M-203; LSCT loop rejoins the main tour
Keweenaw	Phoenix	255.888	411.812	M-26 north / LSCT – Eagle River	Northern end of M-26 concurrency; loop route of the LSCT branches off
Keweenaw	Copper Harbor	276.249	444.580	M-26 south / LSCT – Eagle Harbor	Northern terminus of M-26; LSCT loop rejoins; northern end of Copper Country Trail National Scenic Byway
Keweenaw	Copper Harbor	278.769	448.635	Cul-de-sac	East of Fort Wilkins Historic State Park
1.000 mi = 1.609 km; 1.000 km = 0.621 mi: Concurrency terminus; Incomplete access

== Business loops ==
There have been three business loops for US 41: Ishpeming–Negaunee, Marquette and Baraga. Only the business loop serving Ishpeming and Negaunee is still a state-maintained trunkline, but it is no longer designated Bus. US 41. US 41/M-28 was relocated to bypass the two cities' downtowns in 1937. The highway through downtown Ishpeming and Negaunee later carried the ALT US 41/ALT M-28 designation before being designated Bus. M-28 in 1958. The western end of the business loop was transferred to local government control when Bus. M-28 was moved along Lakeshore Drive in 1999.

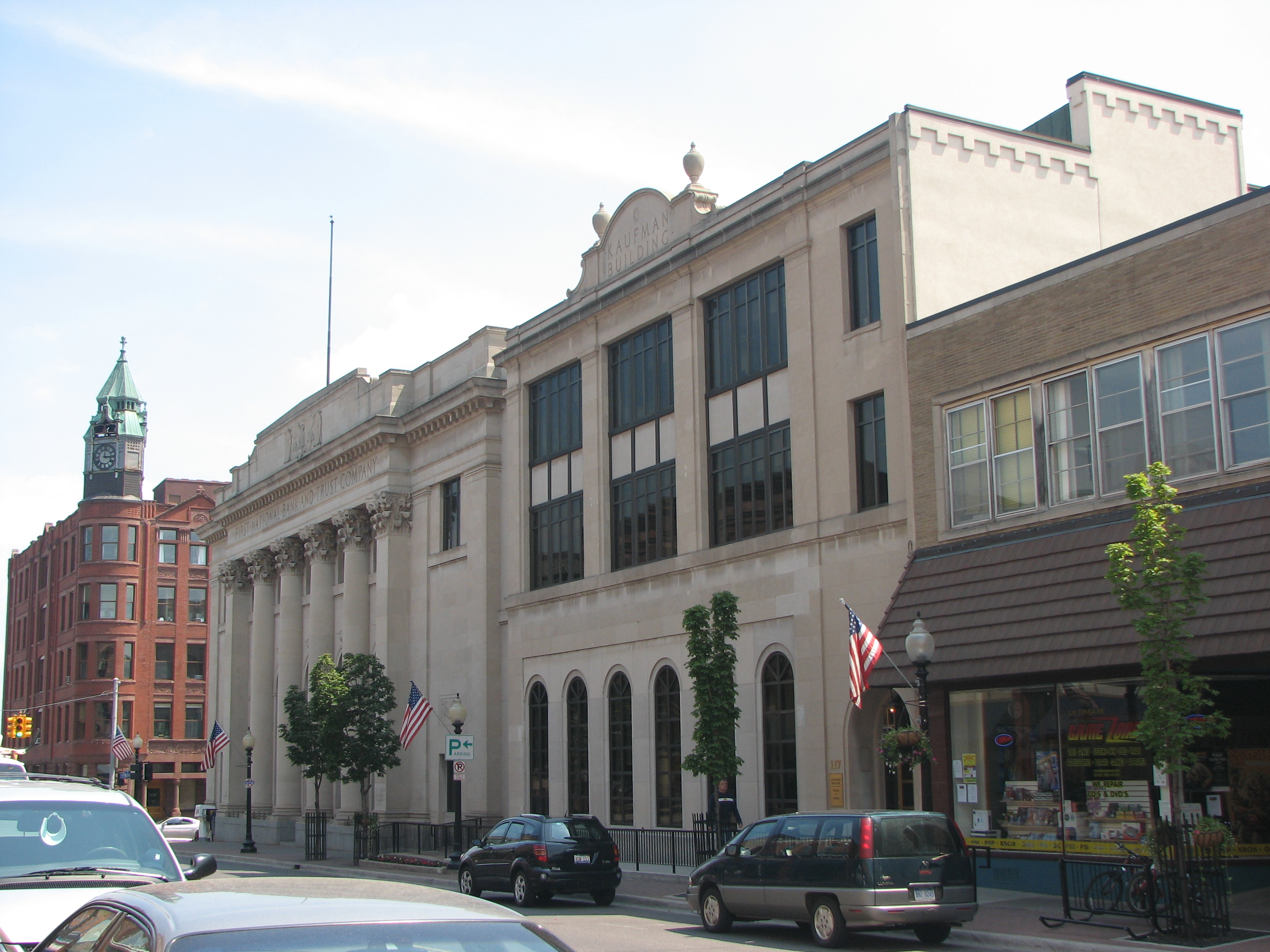
The former Bus. US 41 along Washington Street in downtown Marquette

Bus. US 41 in Marquette was first shown on a map in 1964 after the construction of the Marquette Bypass. It was later designated Bus. US 41/Bus. M-28 on a map in 1975; this second designation was removed from maps by 1982. The entire business loop was turned back to local control in a "route swap" between the City of Marquette and MDOT announced in early 2005. The proposal transferred jurisdiction on the unsigned M-554 and the business route from the state to the city. The state would take jurisdiction over a segment of McClellan Avenue to be used to extend M-553 to US 41/M-28. In addition, MDOT would pay $2.5 million (equivalent to $3.8 million in 2024) for reconstruction work planned for 2007. The transfer would increase Marquette's operational and maintenance liability expenses by $26,000 (equivalent to $40,011 in 2024) and place the financial burden of the future replacement of a stop light on the city. On October 10, 2005, MDOT and Marquette transferred jurisdiction over the three roadways. As a result, Bus. US 41 was decommissioned when the local government took control over Washington and Front streets. As a result of the decommissioning, the 2006 maps did not show the former business loop.

Business US Highway 41
- Location: Baraga, Michigan
- Length: 4.256 mi (6.849 km)
- Existed: by April 15, 1940–by June 15, 1942

The third business loop was in Baraga in the early 1940s. As shown on the maps of the time, US 41 was relocated in Baraga between the publication of the December 1, 1939, and the April 15, 1940, MSHD maps. A business loop followed the old routing through downtown. The last map that shows the loop was published on July 1, 1941. Bus. US 41 is shown under local control on the June 15, 1942, map.

== See also ==
US Highway 41
Previous state: Wisconsin	Michigan	Next state: Terminus
