= M-203 (Michigan highway) =

State highway in Houghton County, Michigan, United States

M-203
- M-203 highlighted in red

Route information
- Maintained by MDOT
- Length: 17.944 mi (28.878 km)
- Existed: 1933–present
- Tourist routes: Lake Superior Circle Tour loop

Major junctions
- South end: US 41 in Hancock
- North end: US 41 / M-26 in Calumet

Location
- Country: United States
- State: Michigan
- Counties: Houghton

Highway system
- Michigan State Trunkline Highway System; Interstate; US; State; Byways
← M-201	→ M-204

M-203 is a north–south state trunkline highway in the Upper Peninsula of the US state of Michigan. It connects McLain State Park with US 41 on each end in Hancock and Calumet. The trunkline has existed since its commission in 1933, except a period of time when it was temporarily decommissioned.

== Route description ==
The M-203 designation is maintained by the Michigan Department of Transportation (MDOT) to provide access to McLain State Park. The trunkline is not listed on the National Highway System, a system of strategically important highways. No section of it is located on the Lake Superior Circle Tour, although it is the closest state trunkline to Lake Superior in the area. The highway runs through forest lands and city streets most of the way, with the section along the Portage Lake Canal being residential most of the way.

=== Southern section ===
The southern terminus of M-203 is at the west end of a pair of one-way streets carrying US 41 through the City of Hancock at the bottom of Quincy Hill. Northbound US 41 follows Quincy Street while southbound traffic is directed along Hancock Street. The two directions merge along Lincoln Drive, and M-203 is the two-way, western continuation of Quincy Street west of Lincoln Drive, passing north of the St. Joseph Cemetery. M-203 then runs along the north shore of the Portage Lake Canal turning northward and northwesterly along the canal. South of the canal's northern entry to Lake Superior, MDOT measured the annual average daily traffic (AADT) at 820 vehicles in 2007. By Bear Lake Road, M-203 turns east to the front gate of the state park running parallel to Lake Superior.

=== McLain State Park ===
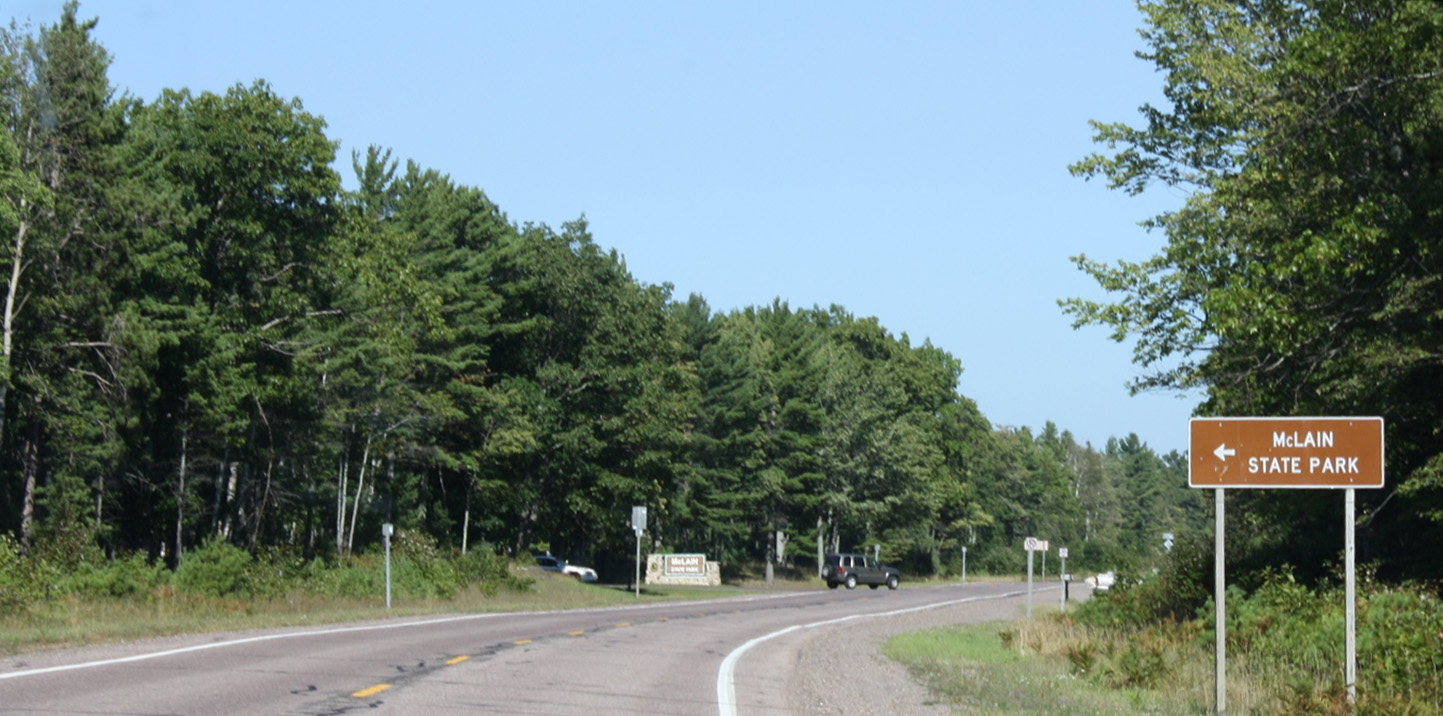
Entrance to McLain State Park

McLain State Park is a Michigan state park on the Keweenaw Peninsula, in the Copper Country. It is located on M-203 halfway between Hancock and Calumet. The park is on the shore of Lake Superior, and most of the beach areas are rocky. However, a stretch of land on the edge of the park near the Keweenaw Waterway is sandy and good for swimming. This area is known as the Breakwaters, known to some locals as just the "Breakers".

=== Northern section ===
Passing the park gate, M-203 continues northeasterly. The roadway skirts the northern shore of Bear Lake on the eastern end of the state park. At Lakeshore Drive, M-203 turns inland running due east to Cloverland Road then turning north and east along Veterans Memorial Highway. Along this section of roadway, the AADT was measured at 440 vehicles in 2007. The highway follows Veterans Memorial Highway through the neighborhood of Tamarack west of Calumet. From there it continues eastward, following Pine Street north of downtown Calumet, looping back to US 41/M-26. The northern terminus of M-203 is at the intersection of Pine Street and Calumet Avenue.

== History ==
M-203 was first designated as a spur route from Hancock north to the state park in 1933. It was later cancelled as a state highway in 1939. This cancellation was reversed in late 1940. At this time, the M-203 designation was extended from McLain State Park north (on what was Houghton Co. Rd. 566) to Calumet. A construction project rerouted the roadway near the state park in 1963. The highway's routing was moved out of the park proper, bypassing it to the east. The road surface inside the park was partially obliterated in the process. No further changes to M-203's routing have been made since.

== Major intersections ==
The entire highway is in Houghton County.

Location	mi	km	Destinations	Notes
Hancock	0.000	0.000	US 41 / LSCT – Houghton, Copper Harbor	US 41 is Quincy Street for northbound traffic and Hancock Street southbound; southern end of LSCT loop route
Hancock Township	10.239	16.478	McLain State Park entrance	
Calumet	17.944	28.878	US 41 / M-26 / LSCT (Calumet Avenue) – Copper Harbor, Houghton	Northern end of LSCT loop route
1.000 mi = 1.609 km; 1.000 km = 0.621 mi: Concurrency terminus
