= Keweenaw Waterway Upper Entrance Light =

Lighthouse in Michigan, United States

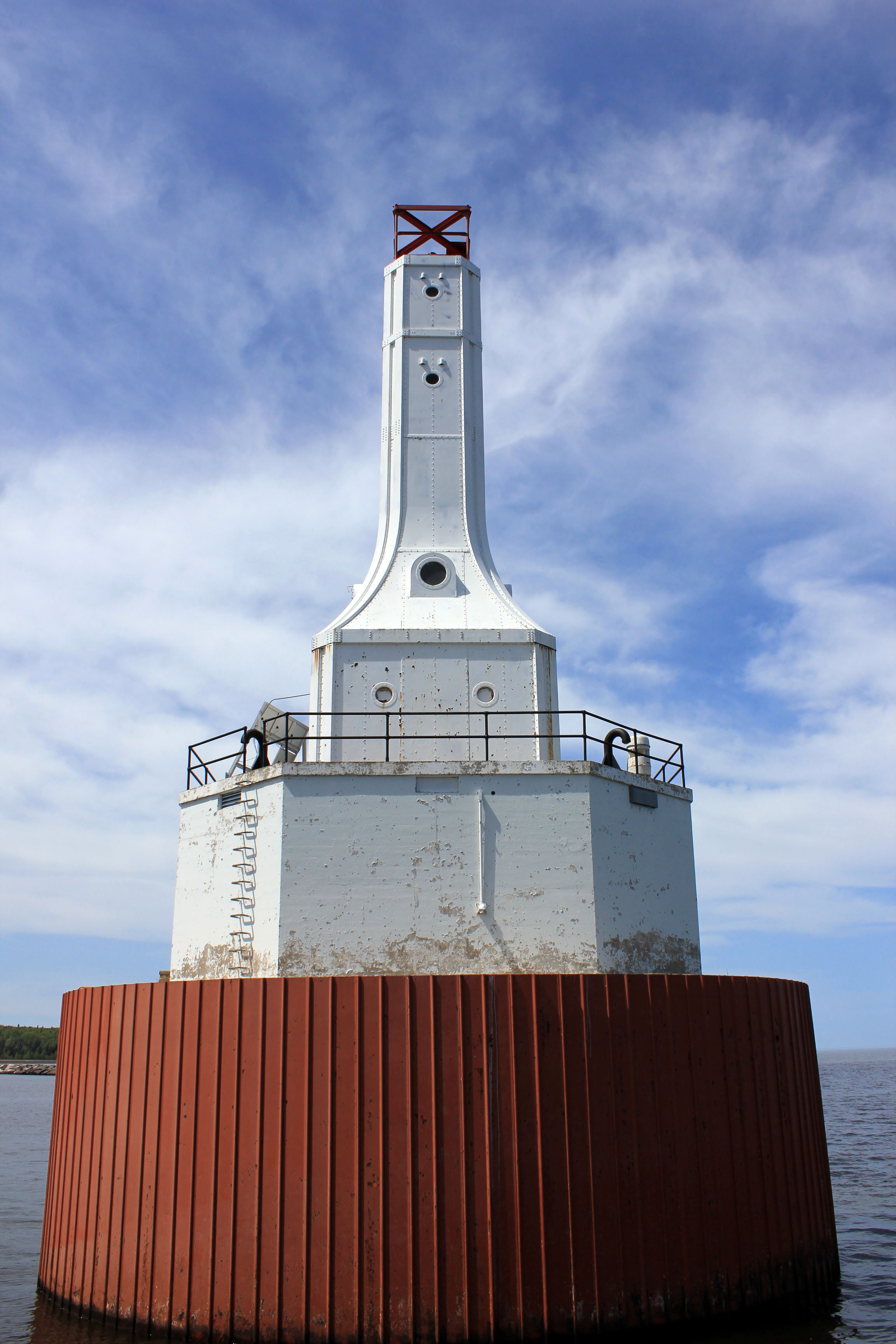
- Location: E. breakwater Keweenaw Waterway, N. end, .4 mi. offshore, Hancock Township, Michigan
- Coordinates: 47°14′4″N 88°37′49″W

Tower
- Constructed: 1950
- Foundation: Crib
- Construction: steel tower
- Automated: 1970s
- Height: Tower - 70 feet (21 m)
- Shape: square tower on cylindrical base
- Markings: white
- Heritage: National Register of Historic Places listed place

Light
- First lit: 1950
- Focal height: 82 feet (25 m)
- Lens: VRB-25 marine beacon.
- Range: 15 nautical miles (28 km; 17 mi)
- Characteristic: Fl White, 15 sec
- Keweenaw Waterway Upper Entrance Light
- U.S. National Register of Historic Places
- Built: 1950
- NRHP reference No.: 14000425
- Added to NRHP: July 18, 2014

The Keweenaw Waterway Upper Entrance Light is a lighthouse located at the north end of the Portage River in McLain State Park in Hancock Township, Michigan. It was listed on the National Register of Historic Places in 2014.

== History ==
The Portage River was first dredged in 1860, and the need for a light to mark the mouth of the waterway was quickly obvious. In 1873, Congress appropriated $14000 to construct a lighthouse at this location. The first lighthouse was constructed in 1874 atop a nearby bluff. As part of ongoing waterway improvements, two piers extending into Lake Superior were constructed to shelter the entrance of the canal. In 1879, a wooden frame tower was constructed on the pier, and in 1887 a steam fog signal was added. The Federal government purchased the canal in 1891, and undertook a program of improvements. The pierhead light was extensively upgraded in 1895. Breakwaters were added in 1901, and in 1903 the ends were marked with pyramidal tower lighthouses.

In the 1930s, the U.S. Army Corps of Engineers undertook an extensive project to widen the canal. As part of this, the old 1874 brick lighthouse was demolished, and was replaced with a tower in 1937. The work on widening was completed in 1949, with a project that modified the location of the breakwaters at the mouth of the canal. This required removing the 1903 lights. In 1950 the current pierhead light was constructed to mark the eastern breakwater. The light was automated in the 1970s.

== Description ==
The Keweenaw Waterway Upper Entrance Light is built on a rock-filled steel sheet piling caisson, supporting a superstructure with a single story octagonal concrete fog signal building with a 50-foot tall steel light tower on top. The tower significantly exemplifies aspects of Streamlined Moderne design.

The foundation of the lighthouse is circular caisson approximately 50 feet in diameter and 45 feet tall, built of interlocking steel sheet piling, filled with rock, and topped with a concrete deck about 15 feet above the level of the lake. Atop this is an 11 feet tall reinforced concrete fog signal building measuring approximately 34 feet by 34 feet. The building is rectangular with clipped corners and is painted white. A double-door entry is on one side, about two feet above the deck.

Centered on the top of the fog signal building is a five-story steel light tower. It was built from a standardized design developed for the U.S. Bureau of Lighthouses during the 1930s. The first story is a rectangle with slightly clipped corners (echoing the shape of the lower fog signal building). Above this, the four sides of the tower curve inward and upward to form a tall narrow rectangular tower. The upper stories of the tower are pierced with port lights. The top of the tower is a flat roof, and supports an open-air VRB-25 marine beacon.
