= UP Hidden Coast Recreational Heritage Trail =

The U.P. Hidden Coast Recreational Heritage Trail is a Pure Michigan Byway on the Upper Peninsula of the US state of Michigan that follows three different highways:

- US Highway 41 (US 41) through Menominee from the Wisconsin–Michigan state line on the Interstate Bridge to M-35 on the north side of town;
- M-35 from US 41 along the Green Bay and Little Bay de Noc to Gladstone; and
- US 2/US 41 from Escanaba to Mather Avenue in Gladstone.
