= Canyon Falls Bridge =

- U.S. National Register of Historic Places
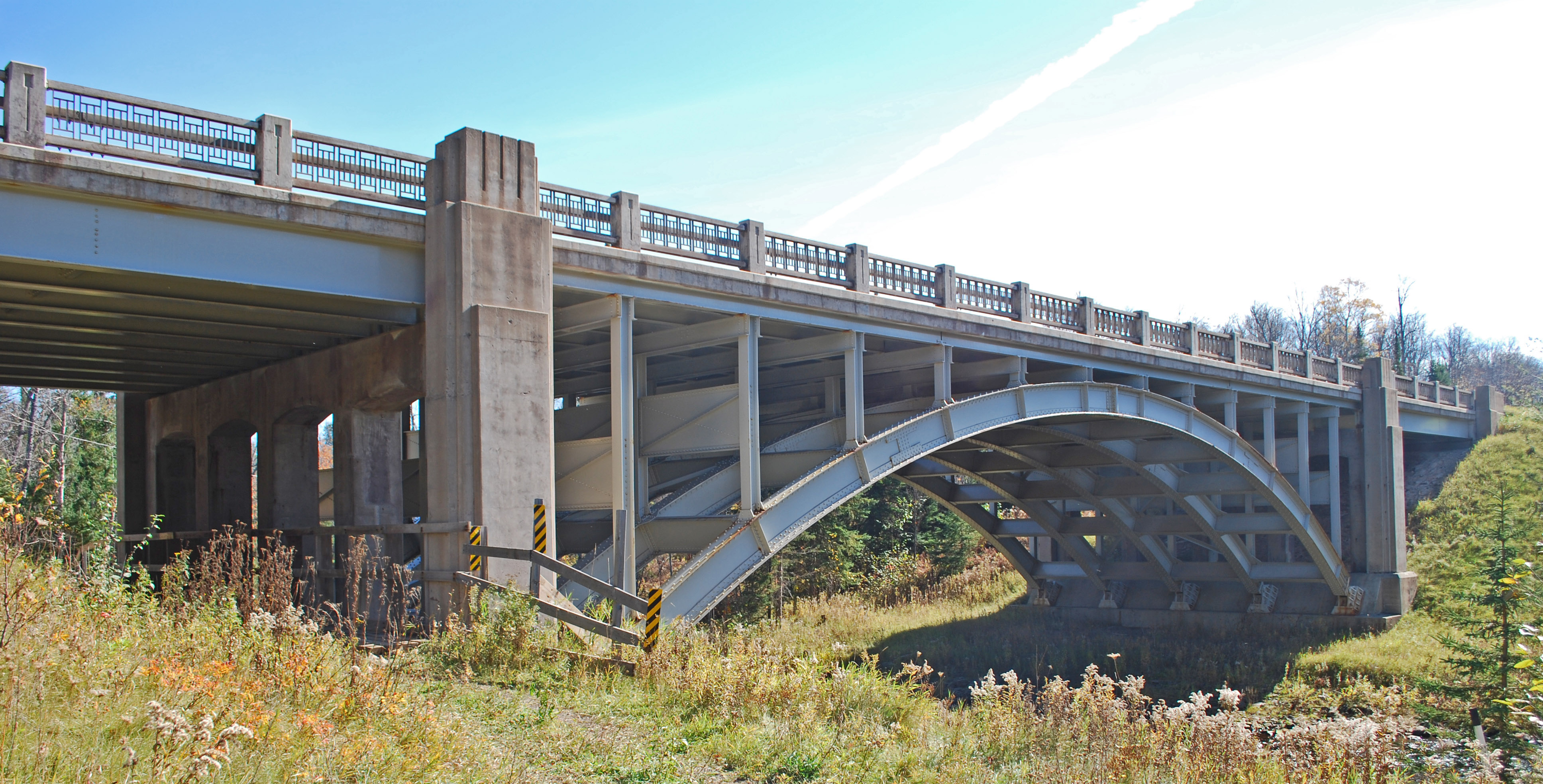
- Bridge span

- Location within Michigan Location within the United States
- Interactive map
- Location: US 41 over Sturgeon River, L'Anse Township, Michigan
- Coordinates: 46°37′31″N 88°28′13″W
- Area: less than 1 acre (0.40 ha)
- Built: 1948
- Architect: Michigan State Highway Department
- Architectural style: steel girder ribbed deck arch
- MPS: Highway Bridges of Michigan MPS
- NRHP reference No.: 99001464
- Added to NRHP: November 30, 1999

The Canyon Falls Bridge is a bridge located on US Highway 41 (US 41) over the Sturgeon River in L'Anse Township, Michigan. It was listed on the National Register of Historic Places in 1999.

== History ==
During 1947–48, the Michigan State Highway Department (MSHD) contracted for the construction of eleven different trunkline bridges in the Upper Peninsula. Five of these bridges were required because of reconstruction to US 41. The Canyon Falls Bridge was designated Bridge No. B2 of 7-4-5 C2 by the MSHD. The steel arch bridge was designed by MSHD engineers and constructed for $116,389.42, plus an additional $58,200 for structural steel. The bridge was completed in the middle of 1948, and has remained in use in essentially unaltered condition since.

This bridge is significant because the steel arch design is relatively rare in the state, due largely to the fact that few river crossings afforded the required vertical distance. The Canyon Falls Bridge is a visually striking construction, representing the Highway Department's focus on aesthetics.

== Description ==
The Canyon Falls Bridge is constructed of a two-hinged, girder-ribbed arch. The span is 128 feet (39 m) long, with 52-foot (16 m) approach spans on each end for an overall structure length of 232 feet (71 m). Five ribs support a 45.4-foot-wide (13.8 m) deck, of which 38 feet (12 m) is used for the asphalt roadway. The ribs rest on massive concrete pedestals.

The configuration of the bridge is highly simplified, with some minimal decoration on ancillary components. Guardrails have ornamental steel rails and balusters, and a decorative concrete pylon tops each arch pedestal. The appearance of the pylons and the profile of the arched ribs gives the bridge a distinctive Art Moderne look.

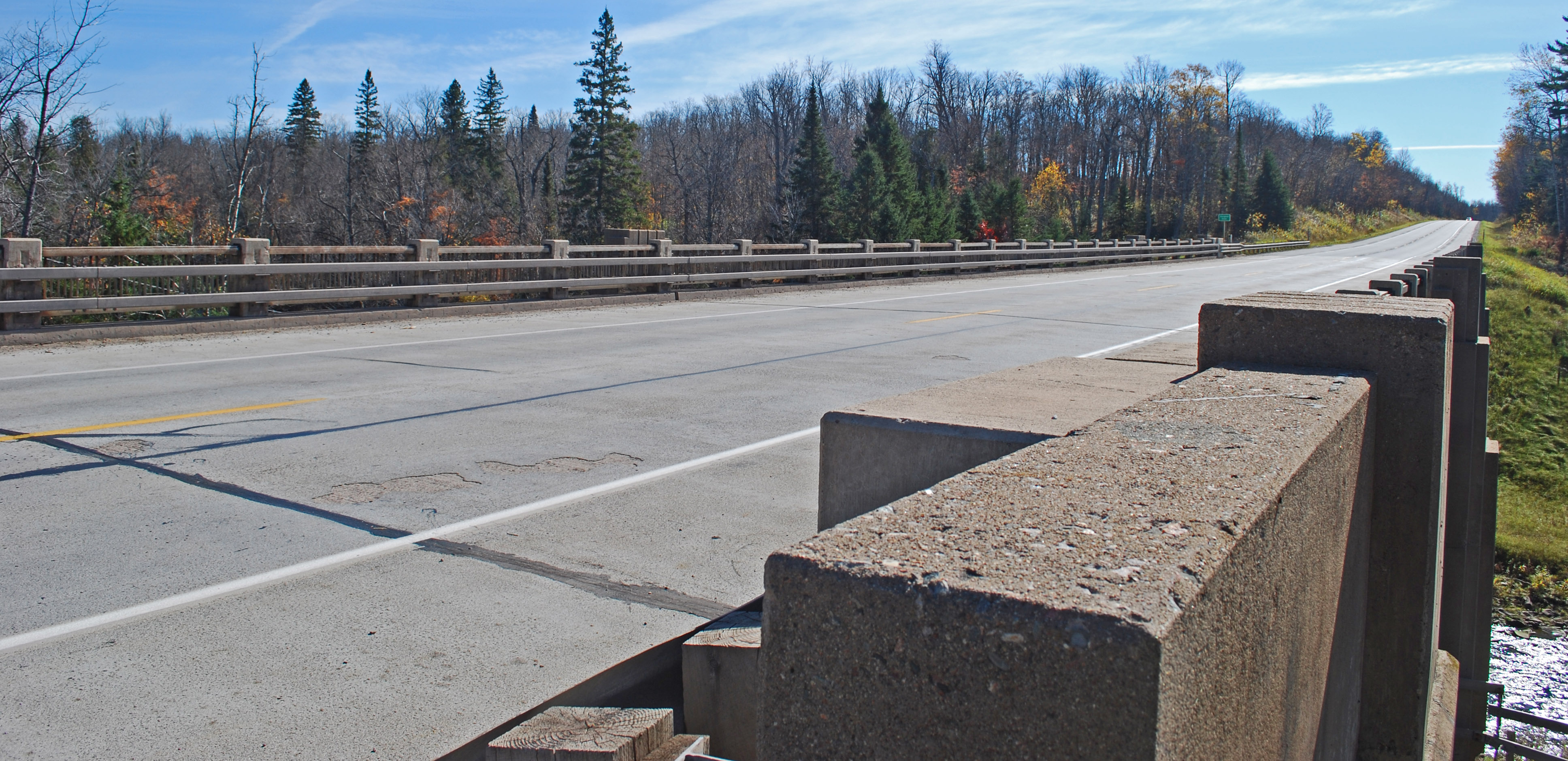
Roadway surface

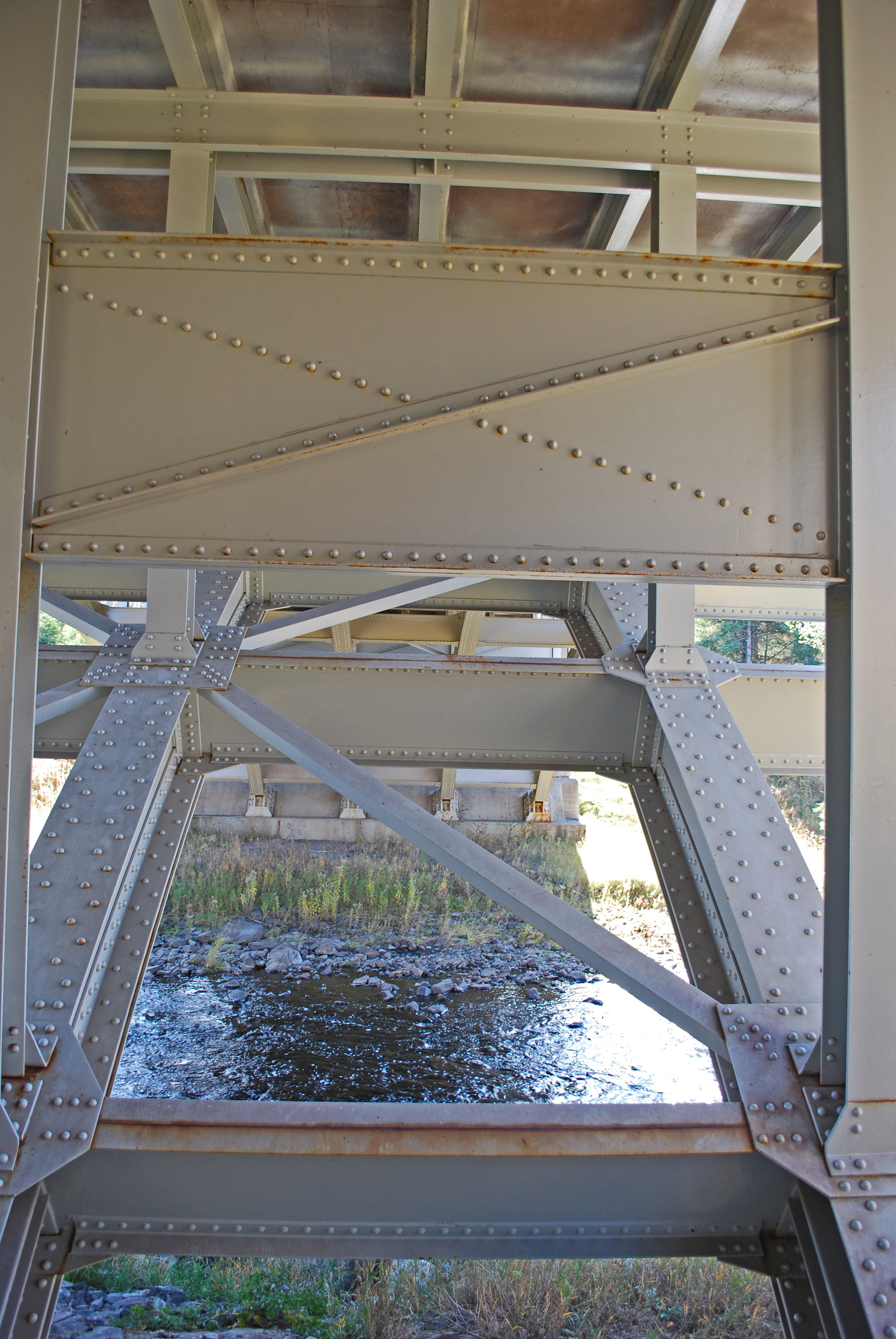
Girder work underneath the bridge

== See also ==
- List of bridges on the National Register of Historic Places in Michigan
- National Register of Historic Places listings in Baraga County, Michigan
