= Old US 41–Backwater Creek Bridge =

- US-41 (old)–Backwater Creek Bridge
- U.S. National Register of Historic Places
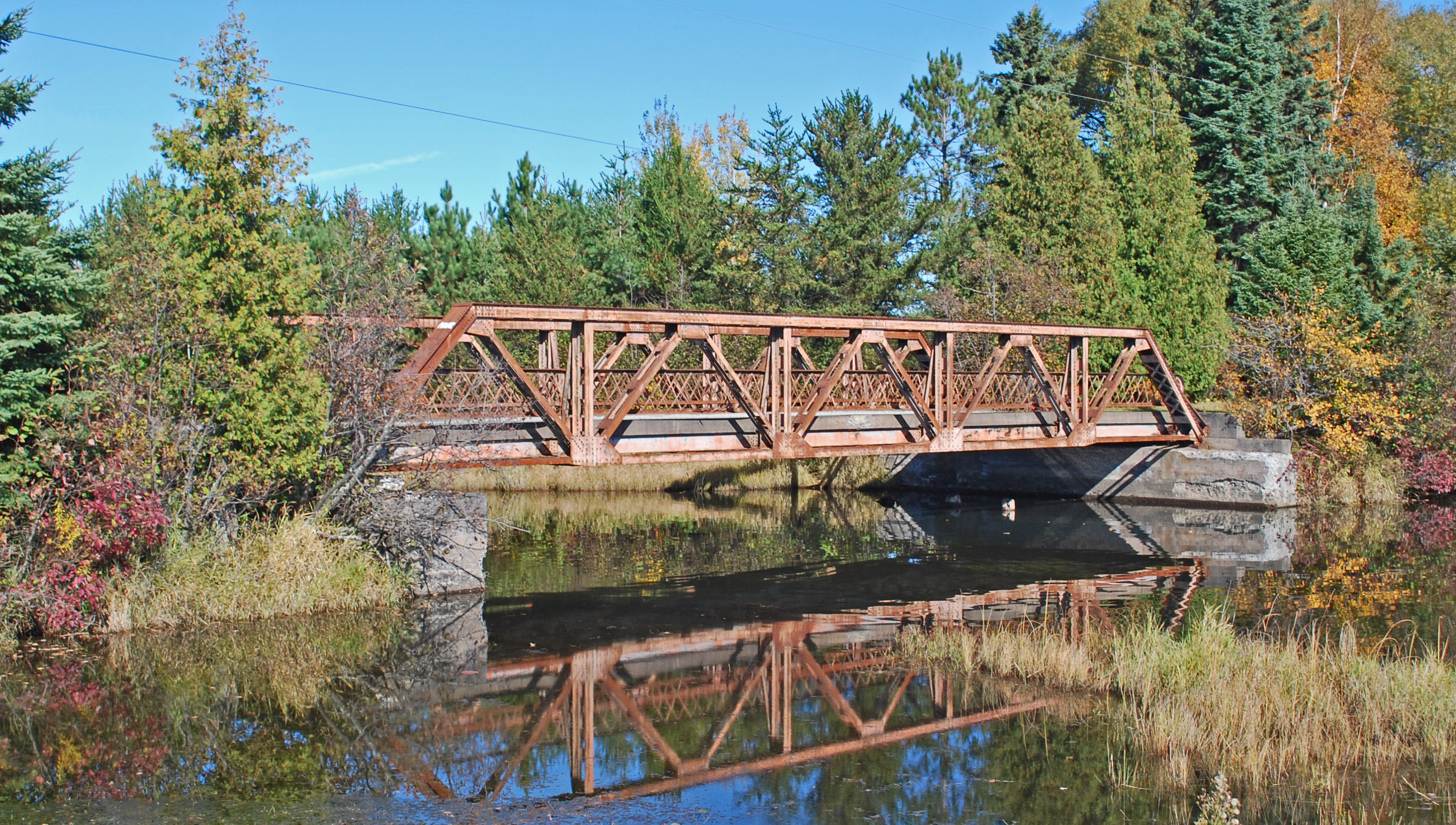

- Location within Michigan Location within the United States
- Interactive map
- Location: Abandoned US 41 over Backwater Creek, Baraga Township, Michigan
- Coordinates: 46°45′16″N 88°29′41″W
- Area: less than 1 acre (0.40 ha)
- Built: 1918
- Built by: Smith-Sparks Construction Company, Northwestern Bridge and Iron Co.
- Architect: Michigan State Highway Dept.
- Architectural style: Warren pony truss
- MPS: Highway Bridges of Michigan MPS
- NRHP reference No.: 99001508
- Added to NRHP: December 9, 1999

The Old US 41–Backwater Creek Bridge is a bridge located on an abandoned section of US Highway 41 (US 41) over Backwater Creek in Baraga Township, Michigan. It was listed on the National Register of Historic Places in 1999.

== History ==
In 1913, the state of Michigan authorized the construction of trunkline roads through the state. A main trunkline route through Baraga County was designated, extending from Michigamme to Chassell. By 1915, the trunkline had been completed, and the Baraga County Road Commission spent the remainder of the decade slowly improving the route, regrading segments and replacing some bridges.

One of the improvements along the route was the construction of a bridge across the end of Keweenaw Bay, two miles (3.2 km) south of Baraga. The Michigan State Highway Department designed a long-span pony truss bridge for the crossing, designated State Trunk Line Bridge No. 86. In 1917, the department awarded contracts for the construction of the bridge: Smith-Sparks Construction Company was awarded $5,414.20 to fabricate the concrete substructure, and the Northwestern Bridge and Iron Company fabricated and installed the truss for $4,536.00. The structure was completed in 1918.

In 1926, the trunkline road was incorporated into US 41. Traffic along the route increased, and eventually a replacement bridge was built nearby. The original bridge remains, in essentially unaltered condition, and is now a privately owned structure.

== Description ==
The Old US 41–Backwater Creek Bridge is a rigidly connected Warren pony truss, 80 feet (24 m) long with an 18-foot-wide (5.5 m) roadway. The deck is constructed of I-beams bolted to the verticals and support stringers, over which a concrete roadway is laid. The trusses are supported by concrete abutments on all four corners, having angled wingwalls.

The bridge is historically important as an early part of the region's infrastructure, and is technologically noteworthy as one of the earliest examples of a standard highway department pony truss design in the state.

== See also ==
- List of bridges on the National Register of Historic Places in Michigan
- National Register of Historic Places listings in Baraga County, Michigan
