= McLain State Park =

State Park in Houghton County, Michigan

F.J. McLain State Park
- Sunset at McLain State Park

- Location within Michigan Location within the United States
- Location: Hancock Township, Houghton County, Michigan, United States
- Nearest city: Calumet, Michigan
- Coordinates: 47°14′13″N 88°36′33″W
- Area: 443 acres (179 ha)
- Elevation: 620 feet (190 m)
- Established: 1930
- Administrator: Michigan Department of Natural Resources
- Designation: Michigan state park
- Named for: Frederick J. McLain
- Website: Official website

F.J. McLain State Park is a 443-acre (179 ha) public recreation area on the Keweenaw Peninsula in Houghton County, Michigan. The state park is located on M-203 halfway between Hancock and Calumet. It is about 10 miles (16 km) from each city. The park's offshore sights include sunsets over Lake Superior and the art deco–style Keweenaw Waterway Upper Entrance Light. (Note: The spelling of the park's name is inconsistent on road signs and in local publications, varying between "McLain", "MacLain", and "McClain". The park is often referred to by locals as "McLain's.")

== History ==
The park is named after Houghton County Commissioner Frederick J. McLain, an instrumental figure in securing land for the site in the 1930s. Laborers working through the Work Projects Administration (WPA) performed most of the park's construction. A new entrance and contact station were built in 1965, following the relocation of M-203. (Note: From 1976 to 2017, the park was the site of Keweenaw Day (K-Day), a "registered student organization fair" held by Michigan Technological University during the first week of the fall semester. The event is now held at a park in Chassell.)

== Activities and amenities ==
The park offers fishing, picnicking, hiking and cross-country skiing trails, camping, and cabins. While the majority of the shoreline is rocky, a stretch known as the Breakwaters near the Keweenaw Waterway at the park's southern end provides a sandy beach for swimming.
