= Interstate Bridge (Marinette, Wisconsin – Menominee, Michigan) =

Bridge in United States of America

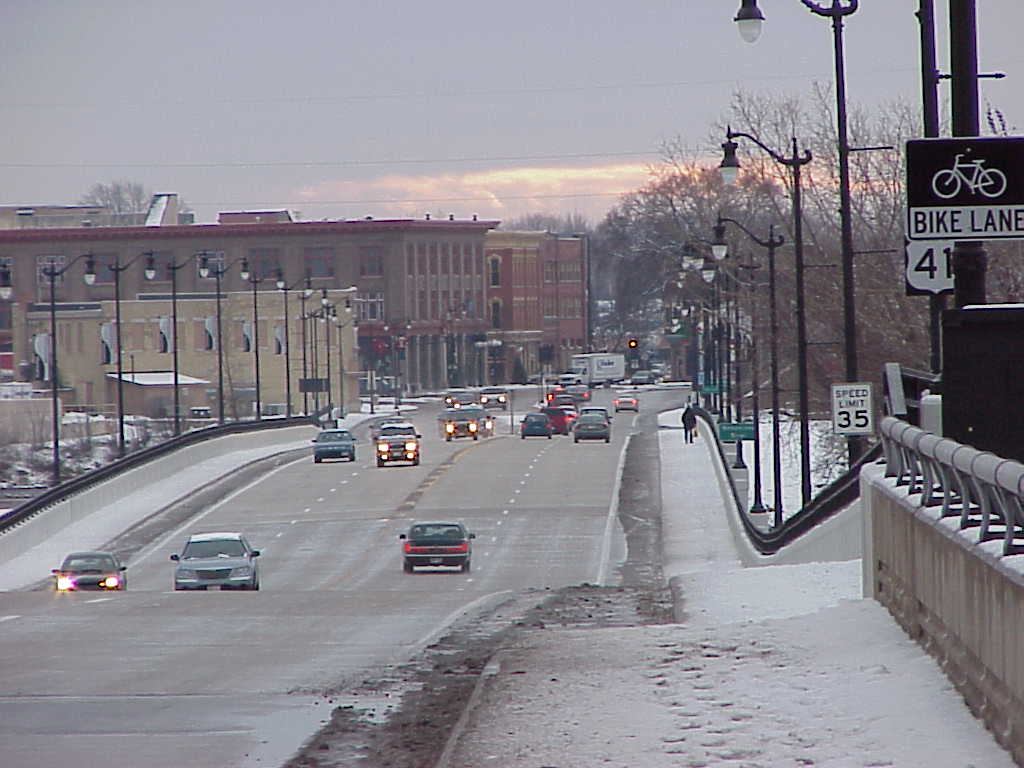
- Coordinates: 45.103077°N 87.626266°W
- Carries: US 41
- Crosses: Menominee River
- Locale: Menominee, Michigan and Marinette, Wisconsin
- Maintained by: MDOT and WisDOT

History
- Opened: 1929, 2005 (current)

Location
- Interactive map of Interstate Bridge

The Interstate Bridge between Marinette, Wisconsin, and Menominee, Michigan, carries U.S. Highway 41 (US 41) over the Menominee River. The current bridge was completed in November 2005 and replaced the previous span built in 1929.

== History ==
The Interstate Bridge was built in 1929 for $700,000 (equivalent to $5.74 million in 2024) to carry US 41 over the Menominee River at the state line. This bridge replaced a series of bridges built to connect Marinette and Menominee across the river. The first bridge was built in 1865 with a second built in 1872. A drawbridge was built in 1897 that connected the two communities farther upstream between downtown Marinette and Menominee's Frenchtown neighborhood near what is now 19th Street.

The first Interstate Bridge replaced the previous bridges. It was built at an angle across the river, prompting one local resident to describe it as being "built up and down [the] river". This bridge served as a vital connection between the two communities across the river. Residents of Menominee that worked in Marinette would drive as many as four times a day across the bridge in the 1930s and 1940s when families owned a single car. The Baby Boomer generation used the bridge as part of "cruising the loop".

The 1929 bridge was 850 feet (259 m) in length, consisting of eleven 80-foot (24 m) spans. The construction used 156,000 cubic yards (119,000 m^{3}) of dirt and 2.2 million pounds (1,000 t) of steel. Planning for the span took about five years to hammer out the details between the two states. Setbacks during construction included flooding of the coffer dams used in the building of the piers that supported the bridge. The bridge opened in December 1929, just months after the October 29 stock market crash. The dedication ceremony for the bridge was held on June 6, 1930, and included governors Walter J. Kohler Sr. of Wisconsin and Fred W. Green of Michigan. The ribbon cutters included Princess Kenoke of the Menominee Tribe.

The bridge was rehabilitated in 1970 in a project that included widening the deck and replacing the guard rails. Another construction project in 1999 repaired the Michigan side and the slough bridge portion of the Wisconsin side of the bridge; the project closed the bridge for six months.

== Reconstruction ==
The Interstate Bridge was replaced on the existing foundations starting on November 1, 2004, in a joint project between the Michigan Department of Transportation (MDOT) and the Wisconsin Department of Transportation (WisDOT). The 13-month project was budgeted to cost $6.45 million (equivalent to $10.2 million in 2024). Demolition started in the center of the bridge, sawing the deck into pieces for disposal. Barges were positioned to catch concrete, preventing it from entering the river. Coffer dams were installed so the piers could be broken up and removed as well. This reconstruction was completed ahead of schedule, with the span reopening on November 22, 2005. The project completely replaced the bridge above the water line with wider 12-foot (3.7 m) traffic lanes, new 5-foot (1.5 m) bicycle lanes and wider 7-foot (2.1 m) sidewalks. Images of wild rice were sculpted into the concrete making up the bridge because "Menominee" in the local Menominee language means "wild rice". These sculptures were added in addition to the other decorative elements added to the new bridge including the railings and light poles. Construction of the Interstate Bridge coincided with a project to replace the span between Marinette and Stephenson Island, which was also built in 1929, and a refurbishment of US 41 through Marinette.

The new Interstate Bridge was dedicated on December 3, 2005, in a ribbon-cutting ceremony that replicated the 1930 ceremony on the previous bridge. Guest speakers included the mayors of both cities, and the Wisconsin secretary of transportation. Catherine Anderson of Pembine, Wisconsin, served as a ribbon cutter while representatives of the local elementary schools held the ribbon. Anderson was a participant in the 1930 dedication ceremony and led the parade to the center of the bridge in a 1930 Ford.
