= Hancock Township, Michigan =

- Civil township
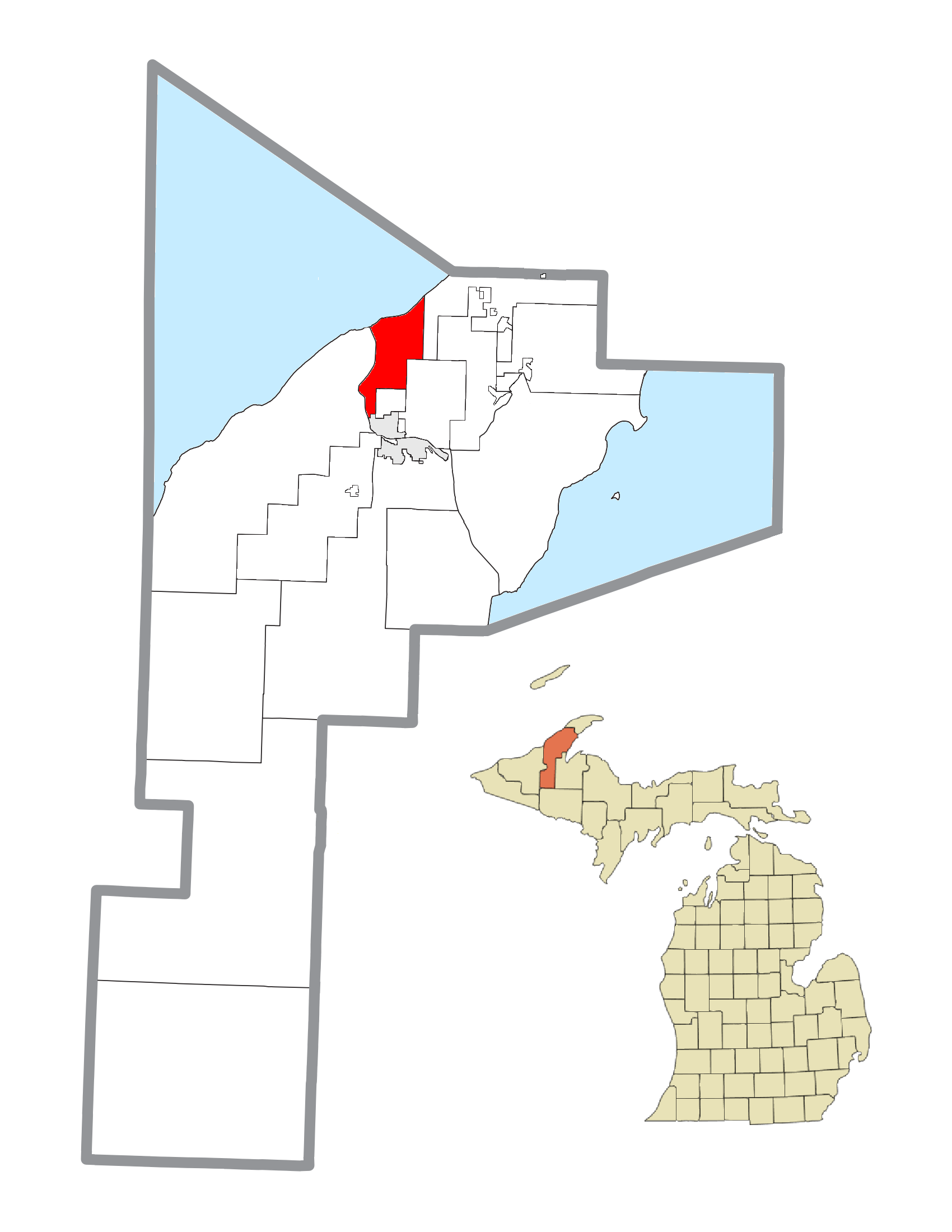
- Location within Houghton County

- Location within the state of Michigan Hancock Township (the United States)
- Coordinates: 47°12′46″N 88°35′07″W
- Country: United States
- State: Michigan
- County: Houghton

Government
  - Supervisor: Kenneth Moyle

Area
  - Total: 16.9 sq mi (43.8 km^{2})
  - Land: 15.9 sq mi (41.2 km^{2})
  - Water: 0.97 sq mi (2.5 km^{2})
- Elevation: 758 ft (231 m)

Population (2020)
  - Total: 500
  - Density: 31/sq mi (12/km^{2})
- Time zone: UTC-5 (Eastern (EST))
  - Summer (DST): UTC-4 (EDT)
- ZIP code(s): 49930 (Hancock)
- Area code: 906
- FIPS code: 26-36320
- GNIS feature ID: 1626429
- Website: https://hancocktwp.org/

Hancock Township is a civil township of Houghton County in the U.S. state of Michigan. The population was 500 at the 2020 census.

== Communities ==
- Salo is an unincorporated community in the township.

== Geography ==
According to the United States Census Bureau, the township has a total area of 16.9 square miles (44 km^{2}), of which 15.9 square miles (41 km^{2}) is land and 1.0 square mile (2.6 km^{2}) (5.80%) is water.

== Demographics ==
As of the census of 2000, there were 408 people, 156 households, and 112 families residing in the township. The population density was 25.6 inhabitants per square mile (9.9/km^{2}). There were 274 housing units at an average density of 17.2 per square mile (6.6/km^{2}). The racial makeup of the township was 98.28% White, 0.25% Pacific Islander, 0.49% from other races, and 0.98% from two or more races. Hispanic or Latino of any race were 0.25% of the population. 50.6% were of Finnish, 12.4% German, and 5.3% English ancestry according to Census 2000.

There were 156 households, out of which 26.9% had children under the age of 18 living with them, 67.3% were married couples living together, 2.6% had a female householder with no husband present, and 27.6% were non-families. 23.7% of all households were made up of individuals, and 12.8% had someone living alone who was 65 years of age or older. The average household size was 2.62 and the average family size was 3.14.

In the township the population was spread out, with 25.7% under the age of 18, 7.8% from 18 to 24, 20.8% from 25 to 44, 30.1% from 45 to 64, and 15.4% who were 65 years of age or older. The median age was 41 years. For every 100 females, there were 93.4 males. For every 100 females age 18 and over, there were 109.0 males.

The median income for a household in the township was $42,083, and the median income for a family was $54,821. Males had a median income of $36,458 versus $21,250 for females. The per capita income for the township was $20,707. About 6.4% of families and 8.4% of the population were below the poverty line, including none of those under age 18 and 13.9% of those age 65 or over.
