= M-48 (Michigan highway) =

State highway in Chippewa and Mackinac counties in Michigan, United States

M-48
- M-48 highlighted in red

Route information
- Maintained by MDOT
- Length: 43.723 mi (70.365 km)
- Existed: c. July 1, 1919–present
- Tourist routes: Lake Huron Circle Tour

Major junctions
- West end: I-75 near Rudyard
- M-129 near Pickford
- East end: M-134 near Goetzville

Location
- Country: United States
- State: Michigan
- Counties: Chippewa, Mackinac

Highway system
- Michigan State Trunkline Highway System; Interstate; US; State; Byways
← M-47	→ M-49

M-48 is an east–west state trunkline highway in the Upper Peninsula (UP) of the US state of Michigan. It connects Rudyard with Pickford and continues to the far eastern end of the UP. The highway runs for 43.723 miles (70.365 km) through rural parts of Chippewa County, including along the county line with Mackinac County. Between 580 and 1,800 vehicles a day use the roadway daily.

The highway was designated by 1919 along a route that ran much farther west in the UP. Within its first decade, M-48 was extended to end at a point north of Newberry. Since the 1960s, it has had its current configuration. A section of roadway that was previously used as part of the western end of the highway was redesignated as a section H-40 in the 1970s.

== Route description ==
M-48 currently starts at an interchange with Interstate 75 (I-75) in the Rudyard area. The highway runs west from the interchange into Rudyard where it turns south, running concurrently with county road H-63. M-48 turns eastward south of town along 22 Mile Road through fields. At Meridian Road, M-48 turns south along M-129 through the community of Pickford. South of town, M-48/M-129 runs long the Chippewa–Mackinac county line and crosses the Munuscong River. M-48 turns east at 26 Mile Road into Chippewa County. The highway zig-zags through rural areas in the southeast of the county. It follows Hanna and 28 Mile roads to Stalwart. In that community, M-48 runs south on Reynolds Road to a corner on the Chippewa–Mackinac county line where the highway turns back east toward the Goetzville area running through the Lake Superior State Forest. After one last north–south segment, M-48 terminates at a junction with M-134 west of DeTour Village near Albany Harbor.

The Michigan Department of Transportation (MDOT) maintains M-48 like all other parts of the state trunkline highway system under its jurisdiction. As a part of these responsibilities, the department tracks the volume of traffic along its roads using a metric called average annual daily traffic (AADT). This measurement is a calculation of the average traffic levels for a roadway segment on any average day of the year. In 2009, MDOT figured that between 580 and 1,800 vehicles a day used sections of M-48. In addition, the department has added the portion of M-48 between the northern M-129 junction and M-134 to the Lake Huron Circle Tour, a scenic drive that loops around the lake. No part of the highway has been added to the National Highway System, a network of roads important to the country's economy, defense, and mobility.

== History ==
On July 1, 1919, M-48 ran from Rexton to Trout Lake and eastward on to Rudyard. The highway continued to Goetzville and ran to DeTour Village at the eastern tip of the UP. By 1927, the western end was moved to a point north of Newberry. M-48 was extended along US Highway 2 (US 2) to Garnet. From there, M-48 ran north to M-28 east of Newberry. It turned west along M-28 into Newberry and then north to Four Mile Corner. In the mid-1930s, M-28's routing through the Newberry area was shifted. As a result of this shift, the section of M-28/M-48 in downtown was renumbered M-28A/M-48. In the early 1940s, US 2 was moved to a new routing along the Lake Michigan shoreline. In the process, the US 2/M-48 concurrency was eliminated. By the same time, M-48 was truncated when M-134 was designated east to the DeTour area. By the end of the decade, M-48 was truncated and rerouted on its western end, replacing the contemporary M-117 south of Rexton to US 2 in Epoufette. All of M-48 west of US 2 was turned over to local jurisdiction and removed from the state highway system, save a section made part of M-123 in late 1960 or early 1961. A few years later, M-48 was extended along a former section of US 2 into Rudyard to connect to the newly opened I-75/US 2 freeway in 1963. After October 1970, the former M-48 west of the current highway was designated as a part of the County-Designated Highway System.

== Major intersections ==
County	Location	mi	km	Destinations	Notes
Chippewa	Rudyard Township	0.000	0.000	I-75 – St. Ignace, Sault Ste. Marie	Exit 373 on I-75
Chippewa	Rudyard	1.660	2.672	H-63 north (Mackinac Trail) H-40 west – Trout Lake	Northern end of H-63 concurrency; eastern terminus of H-40
Chippewa	Rudyard Township	4.571	7.356	H-63 south (Mackinac Trail)	Southern end of H-63 concurrency
Chippewa	Pickford Township	15.703	25.272	M-129 north / LHCT north – Sault Ste. Marie	Northern end of M-129/LHCT concurrency
Chippewa– Mackinac	Pickford Township – Marquette Township	19.684	31.678	M-129 south – Cedarville	Southern end of M-129 concurrency on county line
Chippewa	DeTour Township	43.723	70.365	M-134 / LHCT west – Cedarville, De Tour Village	Southern end of LHCT concurrency
1.000 mi = 1.609 km; 1.000 km = 0.621 mi: Concurrency terminus
