= M-129 (Michigan highway) =

State highway in Mackinac and Chippewa counties in Michigan, United States

M-129
- M-129 highlighted in red

Route information
- Maintained by MDOT
- Length: 33.223 mi (53.467 km)
- Existed: 1939–present
- Tourist routes: Lake Huron Circle Tour

Major junctions
- South end: M-134 in Cedarville
- M-48 in Pickford M-80 near Donaldson M-28 near Dafter
- North end: BL I-75 in Sault Ste. Marie

Location
- Country: United States
- State: Michigan
- Counties: Mackinac, Chippewa

Highway system
- Michigan State Trunkline Highway System; Interstate; US; State; Byways
← Bus. US 127	→ M-130

M-129 is a state trunkline highway in the Upper Peninsula (UP) of the US state of Michigan. It runs from Cedarville to Sault Ste. Marie. South of Nine Mile Road in Chippewa County (and in all of Mackinac County), M-129 overlays the Michigan Meridian. The section of M-129 that overlays the meridian is named Meridian Road. The highway between M-48 and the northern terminus is a part of the larger Lake Huron Circle Tour.

Originally a part of M-12 and US Highway 2 (US 2), the current roadway was formerly designated M-5 from 1930 until 1939. Two other highways were also previously designated M-129. The first was in the western UP in the late 1920s; it was replaced by M-64. The second was in the Keweenaw Peninsula and was replaced by M-26.

== Route description ==
M-129 starts at an intersection between Meridian Road and M-134 in Cedarville. This intersection is northwest of Lake Huron and the 4-mile-long (6 km) La Salle Island, part of Les Cheneaux Islands. The islands are a quiet tourist destination that Hunt's Guide to Michigan's Upper Peninsula describes as "off the beaten tourist track" and full of "low-key charm". From here north, M-129 follows the Michigan Meridian on Meridian Road. The highway forms part of the north–south Mackinac–Chippewa county line as it approaches the community of Pickford. South of Pickford, M-129 and M-48 merge along Meridian Road at 26 Mile Road. M-129 picks up the Lake Huron Circle Tour designation and the two roads cross together over the Munuscong River, which empties into Munuscong Lake, a part of the St. Marys River. These two highways run concurrently through Pickford to 22 Mile Road.

At 22 Mile Road, M-48 turns westerly and M-129 continues north. This intersection is also the location of the Munscong Golf Club. M-129 meets the eastern termini of M-80 and M-28 at 17 Mile Road and 9 Mile Road, respectively. Just before meeting 9 Mile Road, M-129 jogs to the east, leaving Meridian Road to meet up with McKnight Road, which runs parallel to the Michigan Meridian. McKnight Road and I-75 run roughly parallel approaching Sault Ste. Marie from the south. At 3 Mile Road, M-129 enters the city of Sault Ste. Marie east of the southern terminus of BS I-75, and the roadway is renamed Ashmun Street. When BS I-75 meets Ashmun Street, M-129 ends and BS I-75 takes over the Ashmun Street name into downtown.

== History ==
The modern M-129 was originally part of M-12 from 1919 until 1926 and US 2 from 1926 to 1933.

=== Previous designations ===
The first usage of M-129 on a highway in Michigan was on a roadway connecting Lake Gogebic State Park to Marenisco and south to the Wisconsin state line; this routing was designated M-64 in 1930. The second usage was for a highway in the Keweenaw Peninsula connecting Phoenix with Eagle Harbor. This second designation was extended in 1933 to Copper Harbor and replaced by M-26 in 1935.

=== Current designation ===
M-5 was used as the designation for the former US 2 in Mackinac and Chippewa counties until 1939, when it was redesignated as M-129 on maps. The last gravel sections of roadway were paved in 1960 south of Sault Ste. Marie, and the highway was truncated to end at M-134 in Cedarville in 1963. Previous to this, the highway continued south into downtown Cedarville on Merdian Road. A small realignment moved the northern terminus to a new intersection with BS I-75 in Sault Ste. Marie in late 1967.

== Major intersections ==
County	Location	mi	km	Destinations	Notes
Mackinac	Cedarville	0.000	0.000	M-134 / LHCT – Hessel, De Tour Village	
Chippewa	Pickford Township	8.991	14.470	M-48 east / LHCT east (26 Mile Road) – Goetzville	Southern end of M-48/LHCT concurrency
Chippewa	Pickford Township	12.991	20.907	M-48 west (22 Mile Road) – Rudyard	Northern end of M-48 concurrency
Chippewa	Bruce Township	17.991	28.954	M-80 west (17 Mile Road) – Kincheloe	Eastern terminus of M-80
Chippewa	Dafter Township	25.991	41.828	M-28 west (9 Mile Road) – Newberry, Munising	Eastern terminus of M-28
Chippewa	Sault Ste. Marie	33.223	53.467	BS I-75 / LHCT (Ashmun Street)	Northern end of LHCT concurrency
1.000 mi = 1.609 km; 1.000 km = 0.621 mi: Concurrency terminus
