= Pickford Public Schools =

School district in Michigan, United States

Address
- 333 South Pleasant Street Pickford, Chippewa County, Michigan, 49774; United States

District information
- Grades: PreKindergarten–12
- Superintendent: Kyle Rairigh
- Schools: 1
- Budget: $13,986,000 2022–2023 expenditures
- NCES District ID: 2628020

Students and staff
- Students: 430 (2024–2025)
- Teachers: 32.86 (on an FTE basis) (2024–2025)
- Staff: 58.75 FTE (2024–2025)
- Student–teacher ratio: 13.09 (2024–2025)
- District mascot: Panthers

Other information
- Website: pickford.eupschools.org

Pickford Public Schools is a public school district in the Upper Peninsula of Michigan. In Chippewa County, it serves Pickford Township and parts of the townships of Bruce and Raber. In Mackinac County, it serves part of Marquette Township.

== History ==
Pickford's first school was established in 1880, but it was not until two years later that a proper public school was organized and a dedicated school built. A larger school was built around 1900, but it burned in 1917. By this time, there were several small school districts within the present district's boundaries.

Voters chose not to build a replacement school, and class was held above a store for several years. The district tried again in 1920 to pass a bond issue to fund construction of a school, and was successful. Within the new school, a full four-year high school was established in 1921.

However, the new school burned down on February 19, 1922. Although they were still paying for the burned school, voters were eager to rebuild this time and the new school was built on the same foundation as the old one. Meanwhile, the first high school class graduated that year.

A new section of the school was built in 1938. Several outlying school districts with one-room schoolhouses closed in the 1940s and 1950s and consolidated with Pickford. Morrison Gymnasium, named after a school board member, was built in 1957.

In 1997, several new sections were built onto the school building and the oldest section was demolished. Renovations and additions were built in 2022 and 2023.

== Schools ==
Pickford Public Schools operates a single school building at 333 South Pleasant Street in Pickford.
