= M-80 (Michigan highway) =

State highway in Chippewa County, Michigan, United States

M-80
- M-80 highlighted in red

Route information
- Maintained by MDOT
- Length: 7.917 mi (12.741 km)
- Existed: c. 1994–present

Major junctions
- West end: I-75 in Kinross
- East end: M-129 in Pickford Township

Location
- Country: United States
- State: Michigan
- Counties: Chippewa

Highway system
- Michigan State Trunkline Highway System; Interstate; US; State; Byways
← M-79	→ M-81

M-80 is a state trunkline highway in the Upper Peninsula of the US state of Michigan. It runs from Kinross to M-129 near Donaldson. The highway serves the site of the former Kincheloe Air Force Base and the current Chippewa County International Airport. The designation has been used twice before on roads in the Lower Peninsula in the 1910s through 1930s while the current usage dates back to the mid-1990s.

== Route description ==
M-80 starts at exit 378 along Interstate 75 (I-75) near Kinross. A short section of it runs concurrently with H-63 (Mackinac Trail) to connect to ramps in the interchange. This section runs northeast–southwest across the freeway from Mud Lake before the M-80 designation turns southeasterly along Tone Road running past Kinross Lake in a forested area. Tone Road curves sharply northeasterly and then southeasterly to run around the north end of the runway complex at the Chippewa County International Airport. The highway runs due east past the airport terminal area to the south and a prison and the residential area of the former Kincheloe Air Force Base to the north. Near Dukes Lake, M-80 crosses Gaines Highway and leaves the former base and runs through forest to the intersection with M-129 where M-80 terminates. The roadway continues eastward as 17 Mile Road in Pickford Township.

M-80 has not been listed on the National Highway System (NHS) by the Michigan Department of Transportation (MDOT). The NHS is a network of highways important to the country's economy, defense, and mobility. MDOT's annual surveys of the traffic counts are used to compute a value called the annual average daily traffic (AADT), which is a measurement of the number of vehicles on a road for any given day of the year. The survey from 2009 showed that 2,803 vehicles used the western section between I-75 and Gaines Highway, with 61 trucks included in the count. The eastern section was used by 1,657 vehicles and 61 trucks.

== History ==
On July 1, 1919, M-80 existed as a highway in the Lower Peninsula connecting Adrian with Somerset. The highway was included in the route of US Highway 127 in 1926. The M-80 designation was then shifted to a section of highway that was previously part of M-18 near Beaverton The M-80 designation was decommissioned in 1939 when the roadway was transferred back to local control.

The current designation of M-80 was created in 1994–95 when Tone Road through Kinross and the former Kincheloe Air Force Base were transferred to MDOT. The department assigned the roadway its designation and included it on the 1995 map.

== Major intersections ==
The entire highway is in Chippewa County.

Location	mi	km	Destinations	Notes
Kinross	0.000– 0.258	0.000– 0.415	I-75 – St. Ignace, Sault Ste. Marie; H-63	Exit 378 on I-75; segment is concurrent with H-63 to connect ramps to and from I-75
Pickford Township	7.917	12.741	M-129 / LHCT – Cedarville, Sault Ste. Marie; East 17 Mile Road	Roadway continues east as 17 Mile Road
1.000 mi = 1.609 km; 1.000 km = 0.621 mi: Concurrency terminus
