= Keldon =

Keldon may refer to:

- Keldon, Michigan
- Keldon, Ontario
- Keldon class starship, a fictional starship
- Keldon Amadiro, fictional character in Isaac Asimov's Robot series.
- Keldon Johnson, American professional basketball player
- Lawrence Keldon, An author and armoursmith.
