= Raber Township, Michigan =

- Civil township
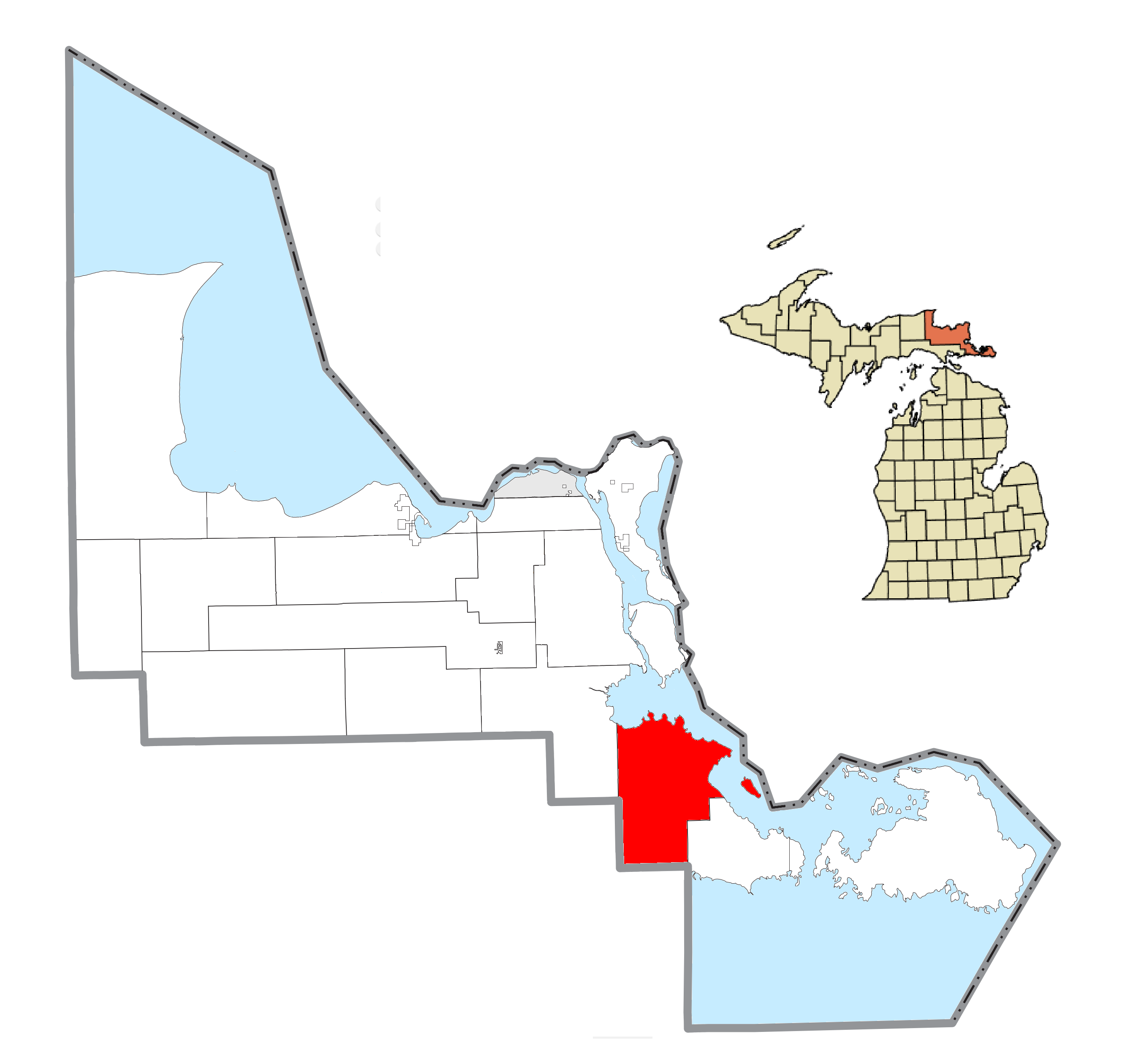
- Location within Chippewa County

- Location within the state of Michigan
- Coordinates: 46°03′53″N 84°09′17″W
- Country: United States
- State: Michigan
- County: Chippewa

Government
  - Supervisor: Paul Warner

Area
  - Total: 143.1 sq mi (370.6 km^{2})
  - Land: 97.8 sq mi (253.3 km^{2})
  - Water: 45.3 sq mi (117.3 km^{2})
- Elevation: 600 ft (183 m)

Population (2020)
  - Total: 632
  - Density: 6.46/sq mi (2.50/km^{2})
- Time zone: UTC-5 (Eastern (EST))
  - Summer (DST): UTC-4 (EDT)
- ZIP code(s): 49710 (Barbeau); 49719 (Cedarville); 49725 (DeTour Village); 49736 (Goetzville); 49774 (Pickford)
- Area code: 906
- FIPS code: 26-66760
- GNIS feature ID: 1626949
- Website: Official website

Raber Township is a civil township of Chippewa County in the U.S. state of Michigan. The population was 632 at the 2020 census.

== Geography ==
Raber Township is located in eastern Chippewa County and is bordered to the northeast by the St. Marys River, with St. Joseph Island in the Algoma District of Ontario, Canada, on the far side. The southern boundary and part of the western boundary of the township follows the Mackinac County line, with the southern boundary very close to the northern shore of Lake Huron. Lake Superior State Forest occupies large areas in the northern and southern parts of the township.

According to the United States Census Bureau, the township has a total area of 143.1 square miles (370.6 km^{2}), of which 97.8 square miles (253.3 km^{2}) is land and 45.3 square miles (117.3 km^{2}), or 31.64%, is water.

DeTour Village is to the southeast, while the DeTour Village 49725 ZIP Code serves the southeast corner of Raber Township. Pickford is to the northwest, while the Pickford 49774 ZIP Code serves the northwest corner of Raber Township.

== Communities ==
- Goetzville is an unincorporated community in the township on M-48 approximately 6 miles (10 km) north of M-134 at 46°03′29″N 84°05′32″W. The Goetzville ZIP code 49736 serves the central portion of the township, as well a small area in the southeast corner of Pickford Township and areas in the northwest of Detour Township. The Goetz family settled here in 1882. A post office was established in October 1882 spelled as Gatesville, but was changed to Goetzville in February 1917.
- Raber is an unincorporated community on Raber Bay in the St. Marys River. It is approximately 2 miles (3 km) north-northeast of Goetzville at 46°05′21″N 84°04′17″W. The first white settler is considered to be John Stevenson from Scotland, who emigrated here in 1878. It was named for Mueller M. Raber, a pioneer lumberman in the area. A post office operated from September 1889 until December 1954.
- Stalwart is an unincorporated community in the township on M-48, approximately 8 miles (13 km) west-northwest of Goetzville at 46°05′53″N 84°14′19″W. Stalwart is an acceptable name for the Goetzville ZIP code. Stalwart was first settled in 1878. An application was submitted in 1881 for a post office to be named "Garfield", after U.S. President James A. Garfield, but the name was already in use at the time by another post office. The application was resubmitted for a post office named "Arthur", after Chester A. Arthur, and was denied for the same reason. Because Garfield and Arthur represented what was known as the Stalwart faction of the Republican Party, the application was made for the post office to be named "Stalwart". The office was established in February 1881.

== Demographics ==
As of the census of 2000, there were 670 people, 310 households, and 208 families residing in the township. The population density was 6.8 per square mile (2.6/km^{2}). There were 602 housing units at an average density of 6.1 per square mile (2.4/km^{2}). The racial makeup of the township was 91.64% White, 0.60% African American, 4.33% Native American, 0.15% Asian, 0.15% from other races, and 3.13% from two or more races. Hispanic or Latino of any race were 1.64% of the population.

There were 310 households, out of which 19.0% had children under the age of 18 living with them, 57.1% were married couples living together, 7.1% had a female householder with no husband present, and 32.6% were non-families. 30.6% of all households were made up of individuals, and 14.8% had someone living alone who was 65 years of age or older. The average household size was 2.16 and the average family size was 2.63.

In the township the population was spread out, with 16.3% under the age of 18, 4.9% from 18 to 24, 21.9% from 25 to 44, 30.6% from 45 to 64, and 26.3% who were 65 years of age or older. The median age was 50 years. For every 100 females, there were 98.2 males. For every 100 females age 18 and over, there were 100.4 males.

The median income for a household in the township was $27,589, and the median income for a family was $36,964. Males had a median income of $30,469 versus $23,750 for females. The per capita income for the township was $18,956. About 8.5% of families and 11.5% of the population were below the poverty line, including 20.3% of those under age 18 and 6.8% of those age 65 or over.
