= MI-12 =

MI-12 can refer to:

- Mil Mi-12, Soviet helicopter
- Michigan's 12th congressional district
- M-12 (Michigan highway)
- MI12, British Military Intelligence Section 12
