= Marquette Township, Michigan =

Marquette Township is the name of some places in the U.S. state of Michigan:

- Marquette Township, Mackinac County, Michigan
- Marquette Township, Marquette County, Michigan

== See also ==
- Marquette, Michigan, a city in Marquette County
