= M-134 (Michigan highway) =

State highway in Mackinac and Chippewa counties in Michigan, United States

M-134
- M-134, Ferry connection

Route information
- Maintained by MDOT and EUPTA
- Length: 50.233 mi (80.842 km) Length includes the ferry connection
- Existed: 1939–present
- Tourist routes: Lake Huron Circle Tour and Spur; M-134 North Huron Byway
- NHS: None

Major junctions
- West end: I-75 near St. Ignace
- M-129 in Cedarville; M-48 south of Goetzville
- East end: Four Corners on Drummond Island

Location
- Country: United States
- State: Michigan
- Counties: Mackinac, Chippewa

Highway system
- Michigan State Trunkline Highway System; Interstate; US; State; Byways
← M-132	→ M-135
← M-3	M-4	→ M-4

M-134 is an east–west state trunkline highway in the Upper Peninsula (UP) of the US state of Michigan. It connects Interstate 75 (I-75) north of St. Ignace with the communities of Hessel, Cedarville and De Tour Village along Lake Huron. East of De Tour, the highway crosses the De Tour Passage on a ferry to run south of the community of Drummond on Drummond Island. It is one of only three state trunklines in Michigan on islands; the others are M-154 on Harsens Island and M-185 on Mackinac Island. M-134 is also one of only two highways to utilize a ferry in Michigan; the other is US Highway 10 (US 10) which crosses Lake Michigan from Manitowoc, Wisconsin, to Ludington. Most of the mainland portion of M-134 is also part of the Lake Huron Circle Tour, and since 2015, it has been a Pure Michigan Byway under the name M-134 North Huron Byway.

A separate highway bore the M-134 designation in the Lower Peninsula from the late 1920s to the late 1930s. The current highway's immediate predecessors were included in the original M-4 in the state. That designation was renumbered to the current M-134 moniker in 1939. Since the trunkline number was finalized, it was extended eastward to end south of Goetzville in the 1950s, with a further extension to De Tour in the 1950s. The western section was moved closer to the lakeshore in the 1960s. The last change came when M-134 was extended to Drummond Island in 1989.

== Route description ==
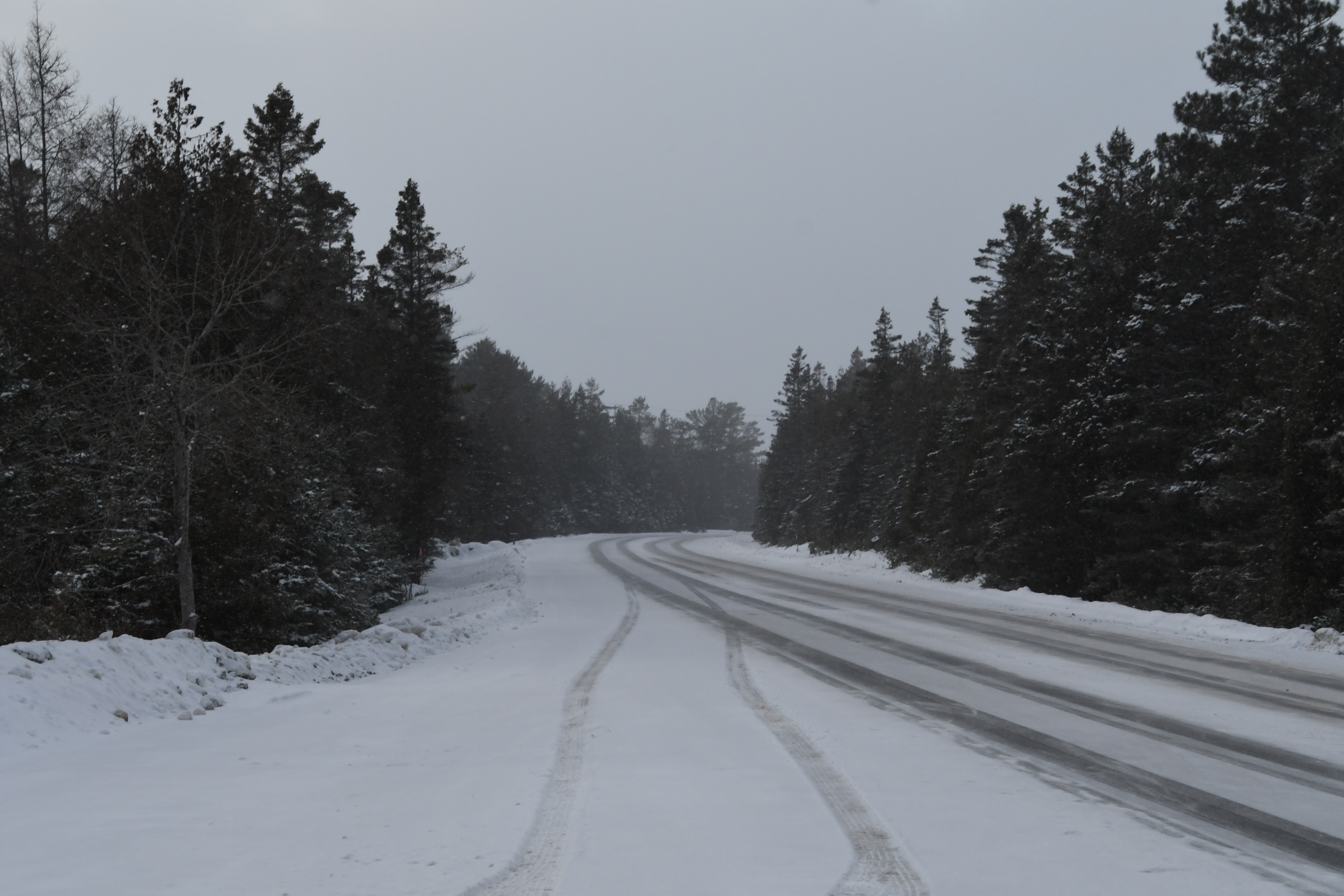
M-134 west of DeTour Village in January 2020

M-134 starts at the interchange for exit 359 along I-75 north of St. Ignace in rural Mackinac County near the St. Martin Bay of Lake Huron. As the highway runs eastward, it carries the Lake Huron Circle Tour over the Pine River on Huron Shore Drive. The trunkline turns to the southeast and follows the shoreline along the bay and runs inland at the bases of the peninsulas that form the Search Bay. Returning to a shoreline routing at Mismer Bay, M-134 runs through the wooded rural areas into Hessel. There Huron Shore Drive continues eastward to Cedarville where the highway meets the south end of M-129 north of Marquette Island. Farther east, M-134 runs along the north side of the many small bays and channels that separate the Les Cheneaux Islands from the mainland. About 6 miles (9.7 km) west of Cedarville, M-134 crosses into Chippewa County for about a mile and a half (2.5 km); the highway passes back into a sliver of Mackinac County that extends along the Lake Huron shoreline for another 5 miles (8.0 km) before finally crossing back into Chippewa County.

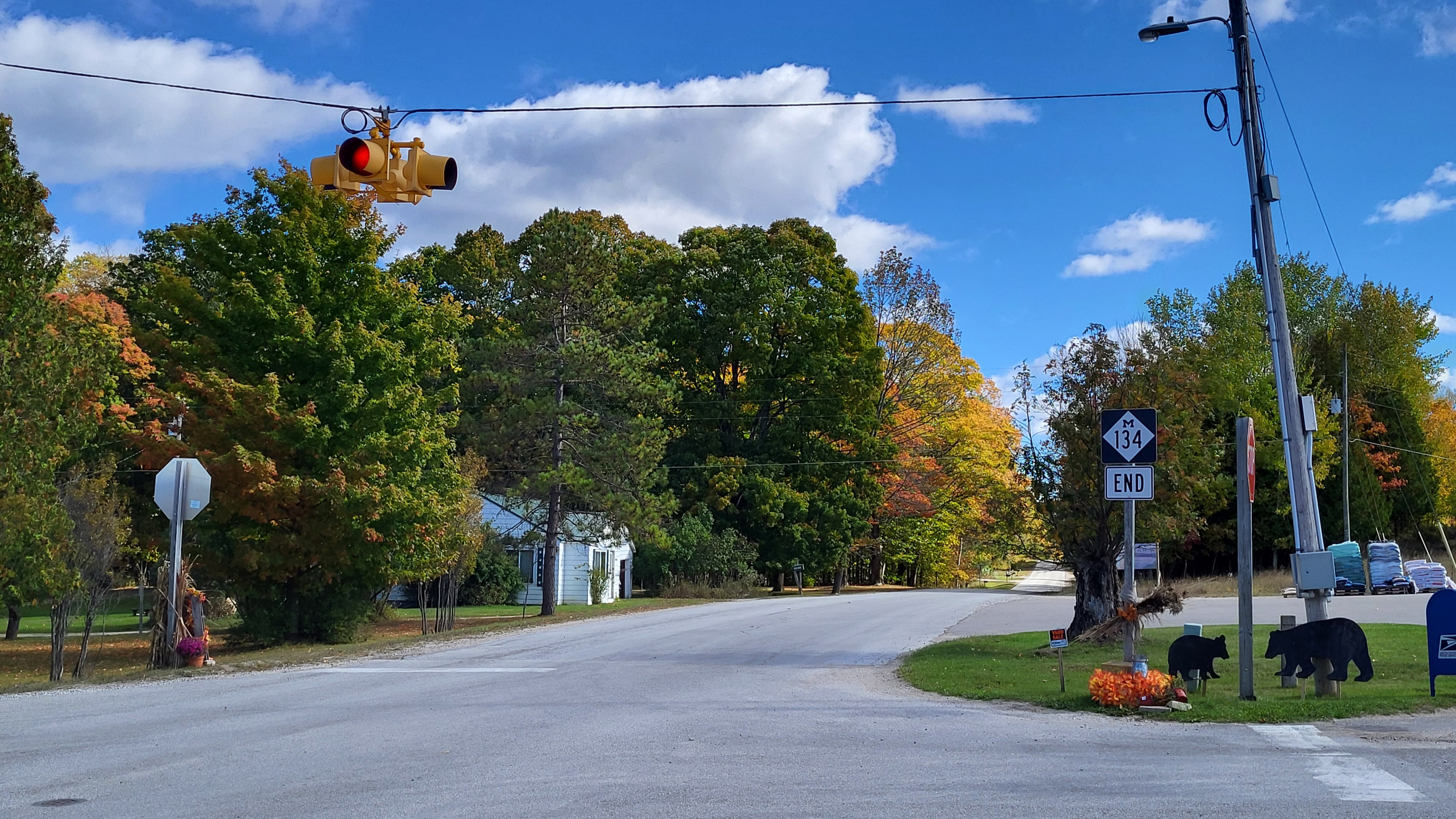
Eastern terminus of M-134 in Drummond Township

Near Albany Harbor, M-134 follows Scenic Road to an intersection with M-48. The main route of the Lake Huron Circle Tour turns north on M-48 while a locally designed loop route continues east on M-134 along Lake Huron. The highway continues past De Tour State Park and St. Vital Point before heading northeasterly to De Tour Village. In the middle of the village, M-134 runs north on Ontario Street and turns east along Elizabeth Street to connect to the ferry docks; the loop tour continues north out of town on county roads. The highway uses the ferry, run by the regional public transportation agency, to cross the De Tour Passage. Once on Drummond Island, M-134 follows Channel Road northward along the passage before turning eastward. The trunkline cuts across to run along Sturgeon Bay on the north shore of the island. On the east side of the bay, M-134 turns inland and runs east to the Four Corners, south of the unincorporated community of Drummond. The trunkline terminates at that intersection south of the Drummond Island Airport where Channel, Townline, Johnswood, and Shore roads (west, north, east and south respectively) come together. M-134 is one of three state highways in Michigan located on an island; the two other state highways located on islands are M-185 on Mackinac Island and M-154 on Harsens Island.

No part of M-134 is listed on the National Highway System, a system of roadways important to the country's economy, defense, and mobility. In 2009, the Michigan Department of Transportation (MDOT) conducted a survey to determine the traffic volume along the highway, reported using a metric called average annual daily traffic (AADT). The department determined that the highest count was the 3,595 vehicles a day that used the highway west of the M-129 junction in Cedarville; the lowest counts were 608 vehicles daily between the M-48 junction and the De Tour village limits. On the island, 667 vehicles use M-134 daily. According to tourism officials in the area, over 100,000 vehicles per year are transported round trip on the ferry with almost twice as many additional passengers.

== Ferry ==
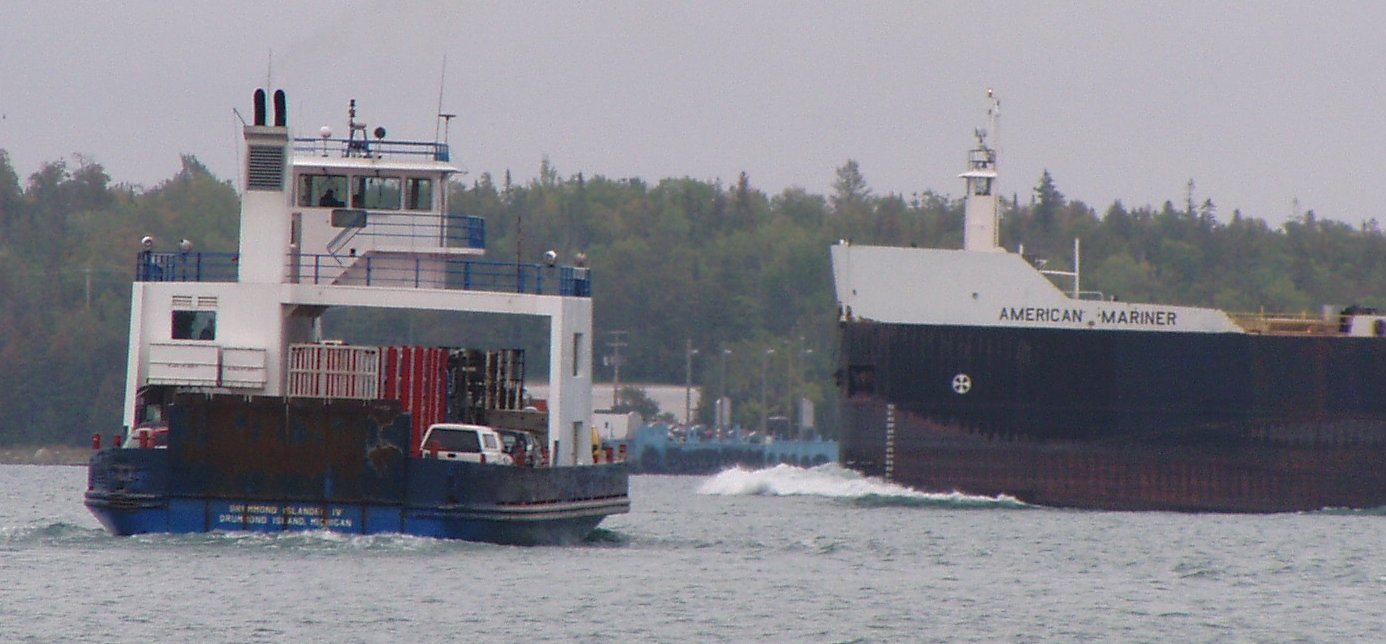
The SS Drummond Islander IV crossing the De Tour Passage near the MV American Mariner

The Eastern Upper Peninsula Transportation Authority (EUPTA) operates the Drummond Island Ferry across the De Tour Passage in addition to two other ferries and the regional rural bus system for Luce and Chippewa counties. As part of the service between De Tour and Drummond Island, EUPTA operates up to three different vessels: the SS Drummond Islander, SS Drummond Islander III and the SS Drummond Islander IV. As of 2022, fares start at $20 per car and increase based on the size of the vehicle transported, including a fuel surcharge. Passenger fares are $2 for adults and $1 for seniors or students; the vehicle driver's fare is included in the vehicle charge. All fares are round trip and collected when departing DeTour Village; there is no fare when departing Drummond Island. Ferries leave Drummond Island at 10 minutes after the hour, from De Tour at 20 minutes to the hour, and run most of the day, all year round, only closing temporarily when high winds and heavy ice occur. M-134 is one of two highways in Michigan to use a ferry connection; the other is US 10 between Ludington, Michigan, and Manitowoc, Wisconsin.

== History ==
Starting in late 1928 or early 1929, the first route designated as M-134 was a road in Missaukee County from M-66 three miles (4.8 km) north of McBain east to Falmouth in the northern Lower Peninsula. In 1938, the Michigan State Highway Department (MSHD) returned the road to local control.

When the rest of the state highway system was first designated, by July 1, 1919, the first state highway in the area of today's M-134 was a section of M-12. That highway segment was used for US 2 in 1926. A rerouting of US 2 was completed in 1933 between Rogers Park and Sault Ste. Marie. The new routing followed Mackinac Trail instead of turning east to Cedarville and north to Sault Ste. Marie. The former routing was given the M-121 designation, and later M-4.

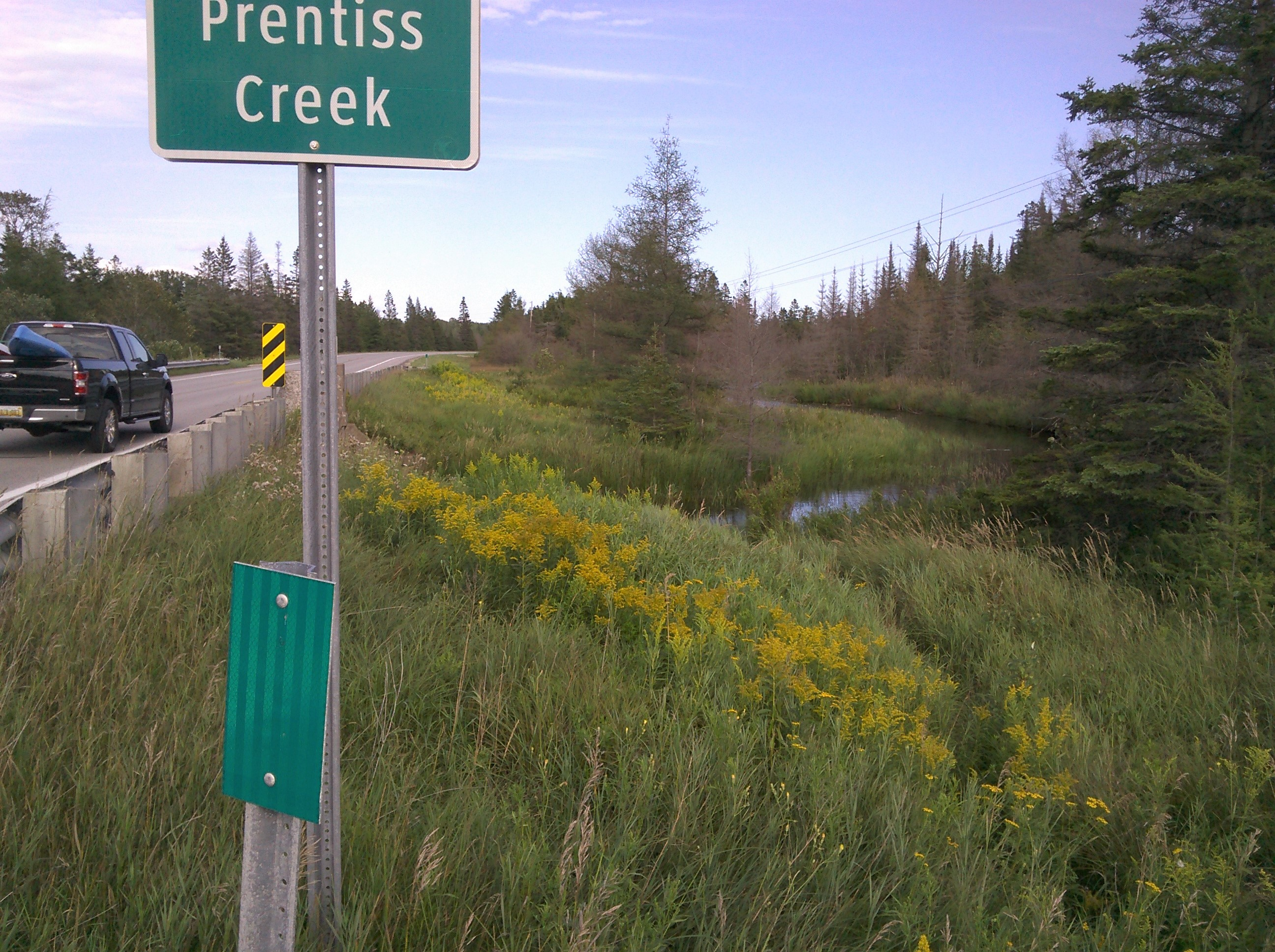
M-134 crossing Prentiss Creek east of Cedarville

The current designation appeared in the Upper Peninsula in 1939, soon after being removed from Missaukee County. It replaced the former M-4 route designation. At the time, M-134 was routed farther inland between US 2 and a point north of Hessel. The highway ended at the Mackinac–Chippewa county line, but an extension farther east was shown on maps of the time as under construction. This segment of roadway was completed in the latter half of 1940, extending M-134 to terminate at M-48 about 10 miles (16 km) west of DeTour. In 1950, a new roadway section was added to the state highway system, bypassing the former routing of M-48 west of DeTour; in the process the MSHD extended M-134 on this new highway and truncated M-48 to the junction south of Goetzville.

In 1958, the highway west of Hessel was shifted to follow an alignment closer to Lake Huron; the MSHD transferred the former routing of M-134 to local control at that time. In October 1963, the final section of I-75/US 2 freeway opened in the UP; M-134's western terminus was truncated slightly to end at the new freeway instead of the former routing of US 2 along Mackinac Trail. In 1989, MDOT extended the trunkline to add a segment on Drummond Island; in the process, the Drummond Island Ferry across the DeTour Passage was added to the route. The entire length of the highway was dedicated as a Pure Michigan Byway on October 16, 2015.

== Major intersections ==
County	Location	mi	km	Destinations	Notes
Mackinac	St. Ignace Township	0.000	0.000	I-75 / LHCT south – St. Ignace, Sault Ste. Marie	Exit 359 on I-75; western end of LHCT concurrency
Mackinac	Cedarville	17.007	27.370	M-129 north – Pickford, Sault Ste. Marie	Southern terminus of M-129
Chippewa	No major junctions				
Mackinac	No major junctions				
Chippewa	DeTour Township	31.139	50.113	M-48 west / LHCT north – Pickford	Eastern terminus of M-48; eastern end of LHCT concurrency mainline, spur route continues eastward
Chippewa	DeTour Passage	41.338– 42.324	66.527– 68.114	Drummond Island Ferry (tolled)	
Chippewa	Drummond Township	50.233	80.842	Four Corners	
1.000 mi = 1.609 km; 1.000 km = 0.621 mi: Concurrency terminus; Tolled

== See also ==
- SS Badger, connects US 10 across Lake Michigan
- Lake Express, a modern ferry that follows a previous route that connected US 16 across Lake Michigan
