= M-12 (Michigan highway) =

- Location: Ironwood–Sault Ste. Marie
- Length: 406.63 mi (654.41 km)
- Existed: c. July 1, 1919–November 11, 1926

M-12 is a former state highway in the Upper Peninsula of Michigan. It was replaced in 1926 by:

- U.S. Highway 2 in Michigan (US 2) between the state line at Ironwood and Crystal Falls
- M-69 between Crystal Falls and Sagola
- M-45 between Sagola and Iron Mountain (now M-95)
- US 2 between Iron Mountain and Sault Ste. Marie

Since 1926, M-12 north of the St. Ignace area has been replaced by:

- Business Loop Interstate 75 through St. Ignace
- County Road H-63 to the Rogers Park area
- M-134 to Cedarville
- M-129 to Sault Ste. Marie
- Business Spur Interstate 75 in Sault Ste. Marie

Browse numbered routes
← US 12	MI	→ M-13
