= Holmes Township, Mackinac County, Michigan =

Holmes Township, Michigan
- Former civil township
- Location within Michigan Location within the United States
- Coordinates: 45°51′23″N 84°37′15″W
- Country: United States
- State: Michigan
- County: Mackinac
- Established: 1827
- Disestablished: 1900
- Time zone: UTC-5 (Eastern (EST))

Holmes Township was a civil township in Mackinac County in the U.S. state of Michigan. Organized on April 12, 1827, Holmes included parts of Michigan's upper and lower peninsulas within the original county of Michilimackinac. The county and township both became smaller over time, until 1895 when Holmes consisted of only Mackinac Island and Round Island. Holmes was incorporated into the City of Mackinac Island effective March 20, 1900.

== 1827 bounds ==
Holmes Township was created with the following legal description:

Commencing at the intersection of the Cheboigun river, with the parallel of north latitude 44 degrees 30 minutes, and running west along said parallel, until it strikes Lake Michigan, thence due north until it intersects the parallel of north latitude 46 degrees, thence east along said parallel until it would intersect a line due north from the place of beginning.

Interpreting this description today is problematic because there is no intersection between the headwaters of the Cheboygan River and the line of 44.5 degrees north latitude. Better maps of northern Michigan rivers were available by 1836, but this discrepancy leaves the original eastern bound of Holmes indeterminate.

Approximate bounds of Holmes Twp. in 1827.

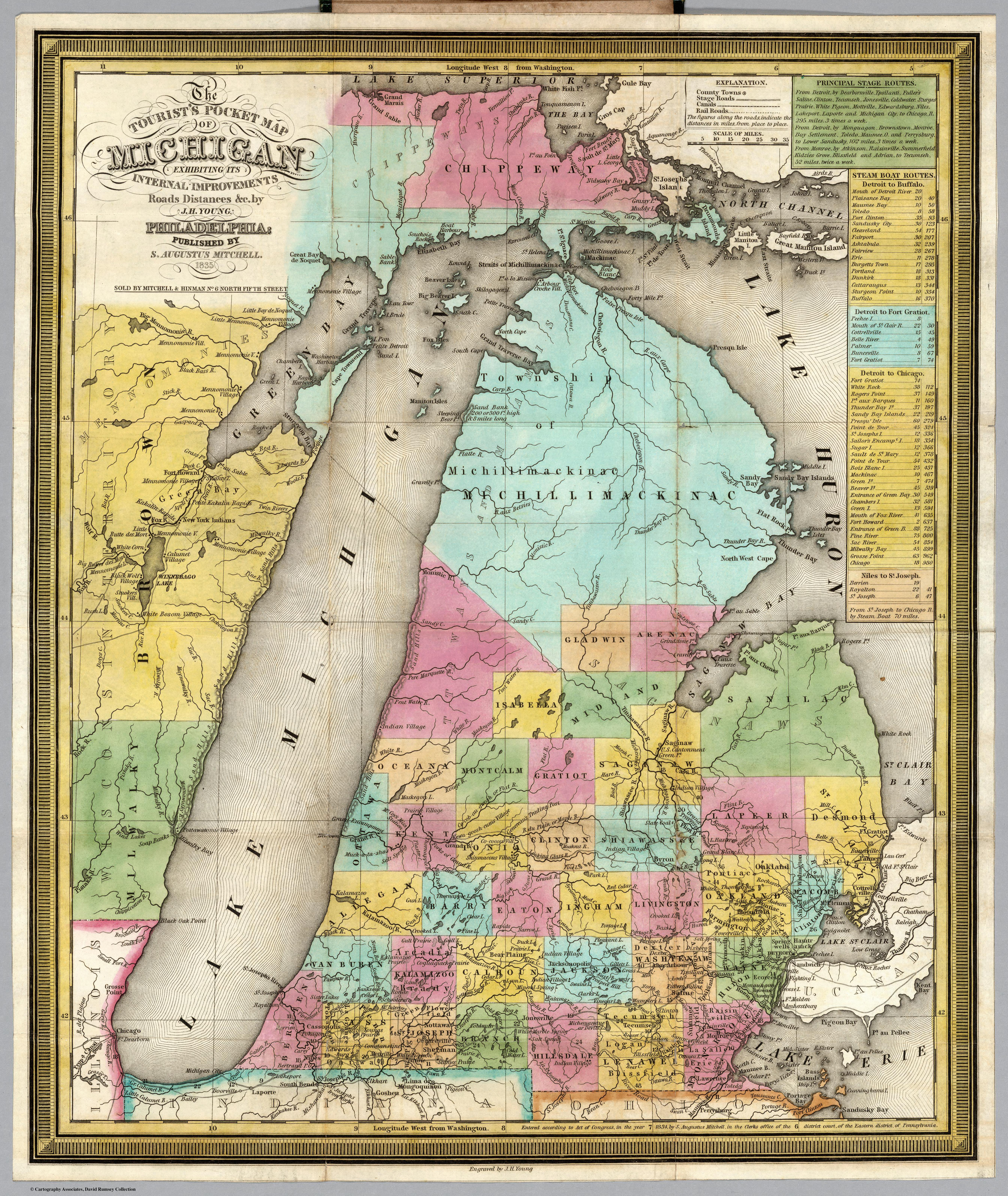
1835 map showing Holmes as "Michillimackinac"

== 1842 name change ==
Holmes Township was renamed to Mackinac Township on February 16, 1842.

The name change was reversed back to Holmes Township on March 9, 1843. This was enacted the same day as the division of the Upper Peninsula. The county of Michilimackinac was notably confined to the Upper Peninsula at that time.

== 1873 map ==
By 1873, Holmes Township was reduced to the portion of Mackinac County east of St. Ignace.

Approximate bounds of Holmes Twp. in 1873.

== 1894 bounds ==
By 1894, Holmes Township was about the size of a survey township in the Upper Peninsula, with Bois Blanc Island, Mackinac Island, Round Island, and St. Martins Island.

Approximate bounds of Holmes Twp. in 1894.
