= Pickford Township, Michigan =

- Civil township
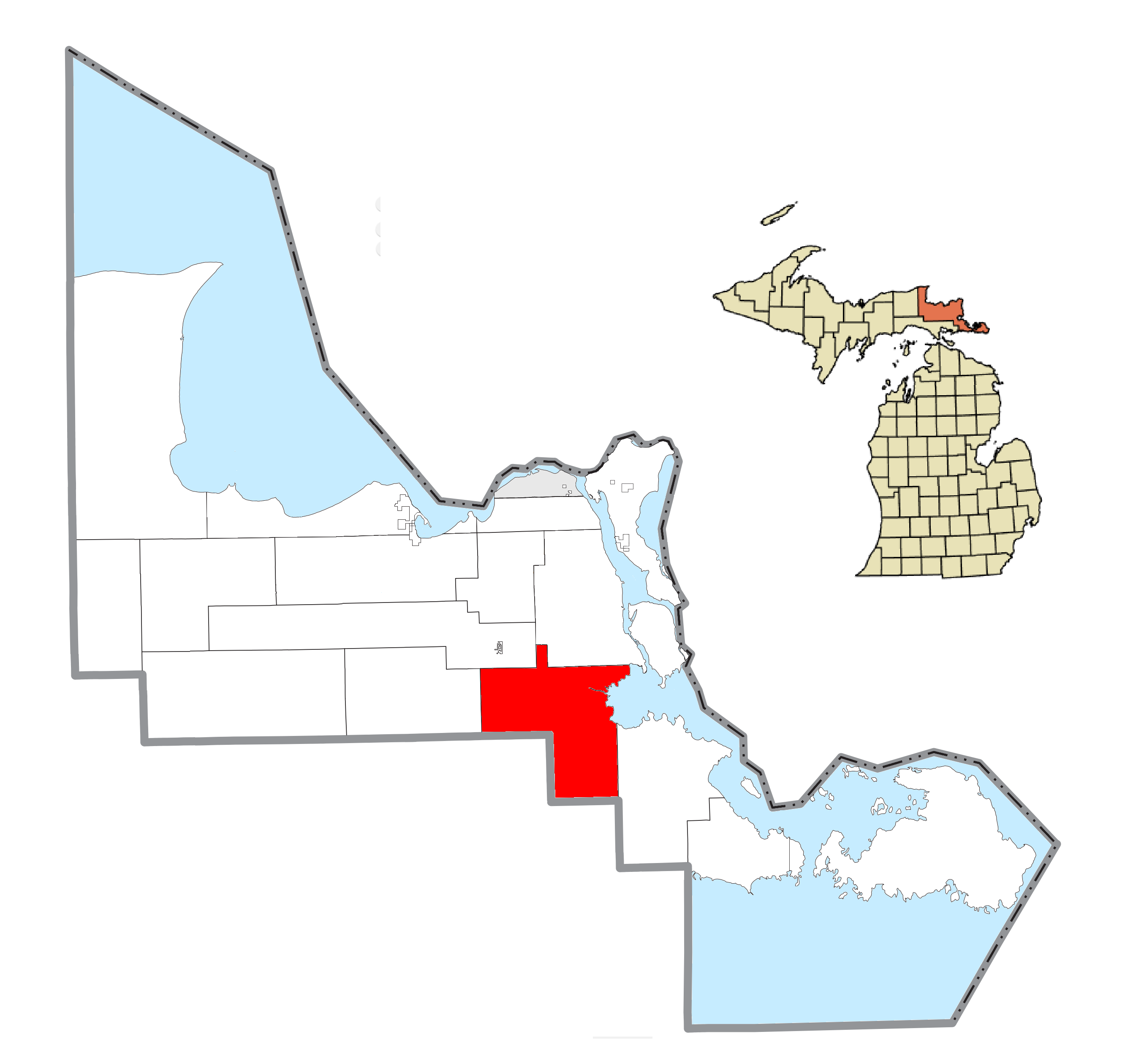
- Location within Chippewa County

- Location within the state of Michigan
- Coordinates: 46°10′58″N 84°21′08″W
- Country: United States
- State: Michigan
- County: Chippewa
- Established: 1896

Government
  - Supervisor: Tom Ball

Area
  - Total: 119.5 sq mi (309.5 km^{2})
  - Land: 108.3 sq mi (280.4 km^{2})
  - Water: 11.3 sq mi (29.2 km^{2})
- Elevation: 627 ft (191 m)

Population (2020)
  - Total: 2,791
  - Density: 25.78/sq mi (9.954/km^{2})
- Time zone: UTC-5 (Eastern (EST))
  - Summer (DST): UTC-4 (EDT)
- ZIP code(s): 49710 (Barbeau); 49752 (Kinross); 49774 (Pickford); 49780 (Rudyard); 49783 (Sault Ste. Marie); 49788 (Kincheloe)
- Area code: 906
- FIPS code: 26-63980
- GNIS feature ID: 1626899
- Website: Official website

Pickford Township is a civil township of Chippewa County in the U.S. state of Michigan. As of the 2020 census, the township population was 2,791.

== Geography ==
Pickford Township is located in southeastern Chippewa County on the Upper Peninsula of Michigan. It is bordered to the south by Mackinac County. The northeastern part of the township extends into Munuscong Lake, a large bay on the St. Marys River. The Munuscong River flows through the center of the township into Munuscong Lake, passing the communities of Pickford, Stirlingville, and Kelden.

According to the United States Census Bureau, the township has a total area of 119.5 square miles (309.5 km^{2}), of which 108.3 square miles (280.4 km^{2}) is land and 11.3 square miles (29.2 km^{2}), or 9.42%, is water.

== Communities ==
- Kelden (also spelled Keldon) is an unincorporated community in the township at 46°12′57″N 84°17′25″W. A post office was established in May 1896.
- Pickford is an unincorporated community on M-129 about 2 miles (3 km) south of M-48 at 46°09′28″N 84°21′49″W. It is at the junction of two survey townships, and a portion is within Marquette Township in adjacent Mackinac County. Charles W. Pickford from Ontario first settled here on the Munuscong River in 1877. A post office was established in February 1880. The Pickford ZIP code, 49774, serves most of Pickford Township as well as portions of southern Bruce Township, eastern Raber Township, and northeast Marquette Township.
- Stirlingville is an unincorporated community in the township at 46°11′14″N 84°19′16″W This was at first called "Jolly's Landing" and was renamed for William P. Stirling, a local storekeeper and steamboat operator. A post office was established in February 1888.
- Barbeau is to the northeast in Bruce Township, but the Barbeau ZIP code 49710 serves the northeast portion of the township.
- Goetzville and Stalwart are to the southeast, and the ZIP code 49736 serves the southeast corner of the township.
- Kinross is to the northwest, and the Kinross ZIP code 49752 serves an area in the northwest part of the township.
- Kincheloe is to the northwest, and the Kincheloe ZIP code 49788 serves a small area in the northwest part of the township.

== Demographics ==
As of the census of 2000, there were 1,584 people, 607 households, and 475 families residing in the township. The population density was 14.6 per square mile (5.6/km^{2}). There were 776 housing units at an average density of 7.2 per square mile (2.8/km^{2}). The racial makeup of the township was 92.11% White, 0.06% African American, 5.81% Native American, 0.06% Asian, and 1.96% from two or more races. Hispanic or Latino of any race were 0.38% of the population.

There were 607 households, out of which 30.6% had children under the age of 18 living with them, 70.8% were married couples living together, 4.8% had a female householder with no husband present, and 21.7% were non-families. 17.8% of all households were made up of individuals, and 8.1% had someone living alone who was 65 years of age or older. The average household size was 2.61 and the average family size was 2.97.

In the township the population was spread out, with 24.3% under the age of 18, 7.1% from 18 to 24, 27.0% from 25 to 44, 25.9% from 45 to 64, and 15.6% who were 65 years of age or older. The median age was 40 years. For every 100 females, there were 102.8 males. For every 100 females age 18 and over, there were 100.5 males.

The median income for a household in the township was $40,850, and the median income for a family was $43,882. Males had a median income of $34,444 versus $22,007 for females. The per capita income for the township was $16,320. About 4.1% of families and 6.6% of the population were below the poverty line, including 8.0% of those under age 18 and 12.4% of those age 65 or over.

== Media ==
- 105.5 FM - WMKD (country music)

== Climate ==
This climatic region is typified by large seasonal temperature differences, with warm to hot (and often humid) summers and cold (sometimes severely cold) winters. According to the Köppen Climate Classification system, Pickford has a humid continental climate, abbreviated "Dfb" on climate maps.
