= Mackinac County, Michigan =

County in Michigan, United States

- County
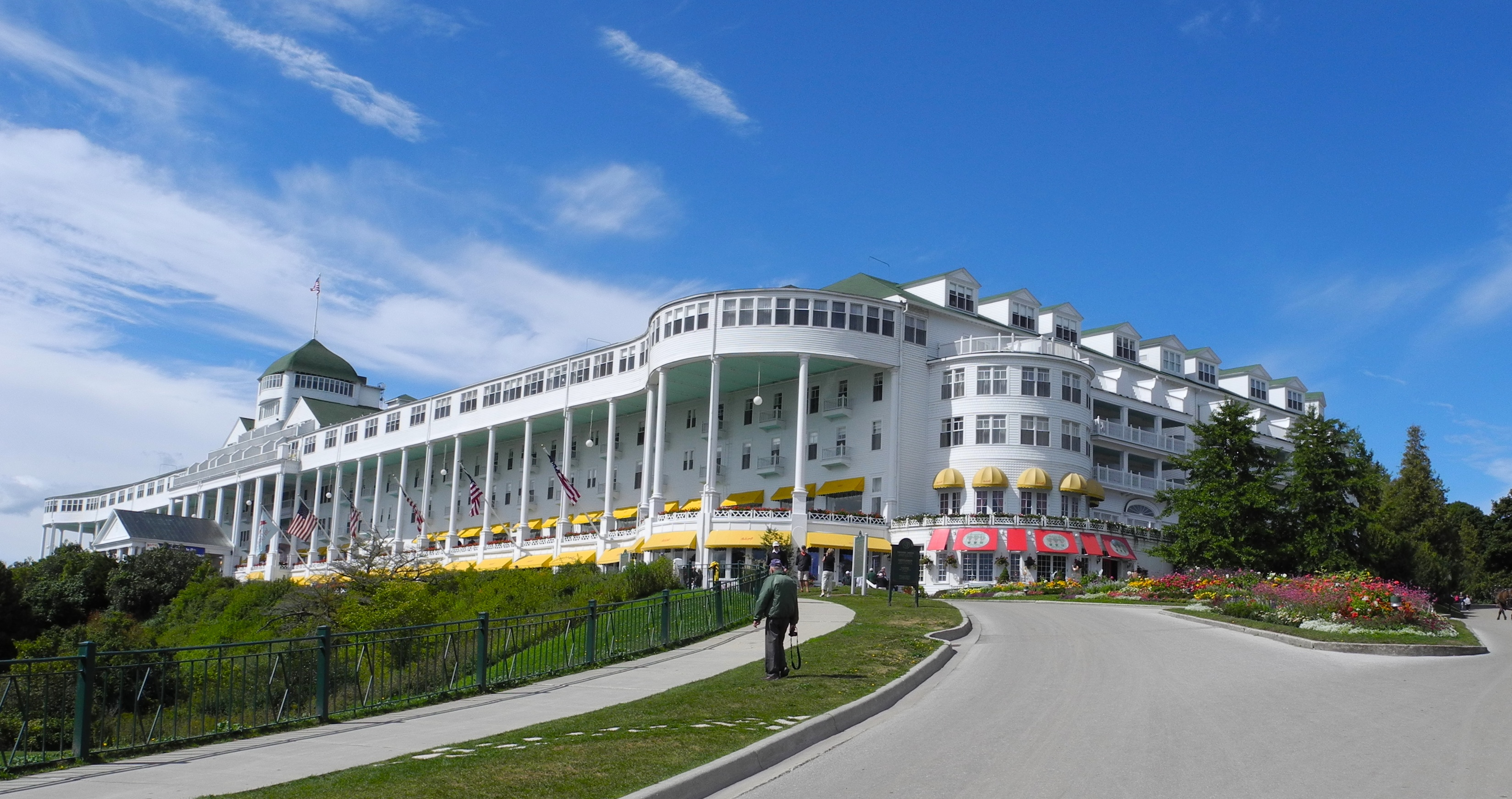
- The Grand Hotel on Mackinac Island

- Location within the U.S. state of Michigan
- Coordinates: 46°01′N 85°01′W
- Country: United States
- State: Michigan
- Founded: October 26, 1818
- Organized: 1849
- Named for: Straits of Mackinac
- Seat: St. Ignace
- Largest city: St. Ignace

Area
  - Total: 2,101 sq mi (5,440 km^{2})
  - Land: 1,022 sq mi (2,650 km^{2})
  - Water: 1,079 sq mi (2,790 km^{2}) 51%

Population (2020)
  - Total: 10,834
  - Estimate (2025): 11,236 ▲
  - Density: 10.60/sq mi (4.093/km^{2})
- Time zone: UTC−5 (Eastern)
  - Summer (DST): UTC−4 (EDT)
- Congressional district: 1st
- Website: www.mackinaccounty.net

Mackinac County (/ˈmækənɔː/ MAK-ə-naw, locally /ˈmækənə/ MAK-ə-nə) is a county in the Upper Peninsula of the U.S. state of Michigan. As of the 2020 census, the population was 10,834. The county seat is St. Ignace. Formerly known as Michilimackinac County, in 1818 it was one of the first counties of the Michigan Territory, as it had long been a center of French and British colonial fur trading, a Catholic church and Protestant mission, and associated settlement. The county's name is shortened from "Michilimackinac", which referred to the Straits of Mackinac area as well as the French settlement at the tip of the lower peninsula. Mackinac County is one of two U.S. counties to feature shorelines on two Great Lakes, being Lake Huron and Lake Michigan (the other county being neighboring Chippewa County).

== History ==
Michilimackinac County was created on October 26, 1818, by proclamation of territorial governor Lewis Cass. The county originally encompassed the Lower Peninsula of Michigan north of Macomb County and almost the entire present Upper Peninsula. As later counties were settled and organized, they were divided from this territory.

On April 1, 1840, areas in the Lower Peninsula were laid off to create 30 new counties. By 1841, the County of Michilimackinac was confined to the Upper Peninsula and its nearby islands, bordering Chippewa and Menominee counties.

On March 9, 1843, Michigan further divided the Upper Peninsula into six counties. At this time, the County of Michilimackinac more closely resembled its modern configuration, including only a portion of the Upper Peninsula closest to the Straits of Mackinac, plus several islands.

At the time of founding, the county seat was the community of Michilimackinac Island on Michilimackinac Island, later known as Mackinac Island, Michigan. This has been an important center for fur trading before the 1830s, when European demand declined. The county was organized in 1849 as Mackinac County. In 1882 the county seat was moved from Mackinac Island to St. Ignace, Michigan, which had been founded as a French Jesuit mission village during the colonial years.

Mackinac County is home to the Mackinac Bands of Chippewa and Ottawa Indians, a Native American state recognized tribe located in St. Ignace.

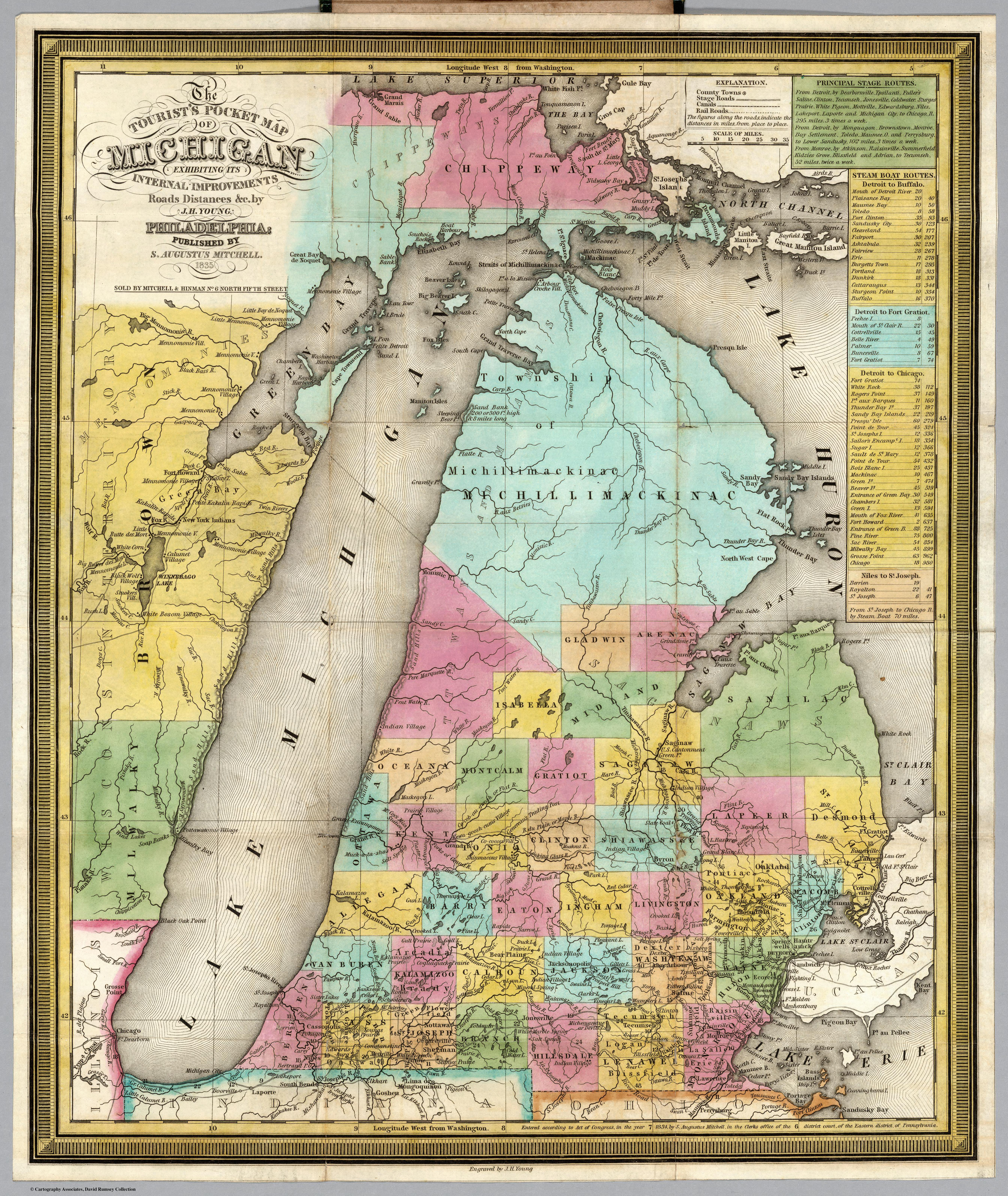
An 1835 Map Of Michigan shows the County of Michilimackinac encompassing the Upper Peninsula and the entirety of Northern Michigan, as well as the "Township of Michillimackinac".
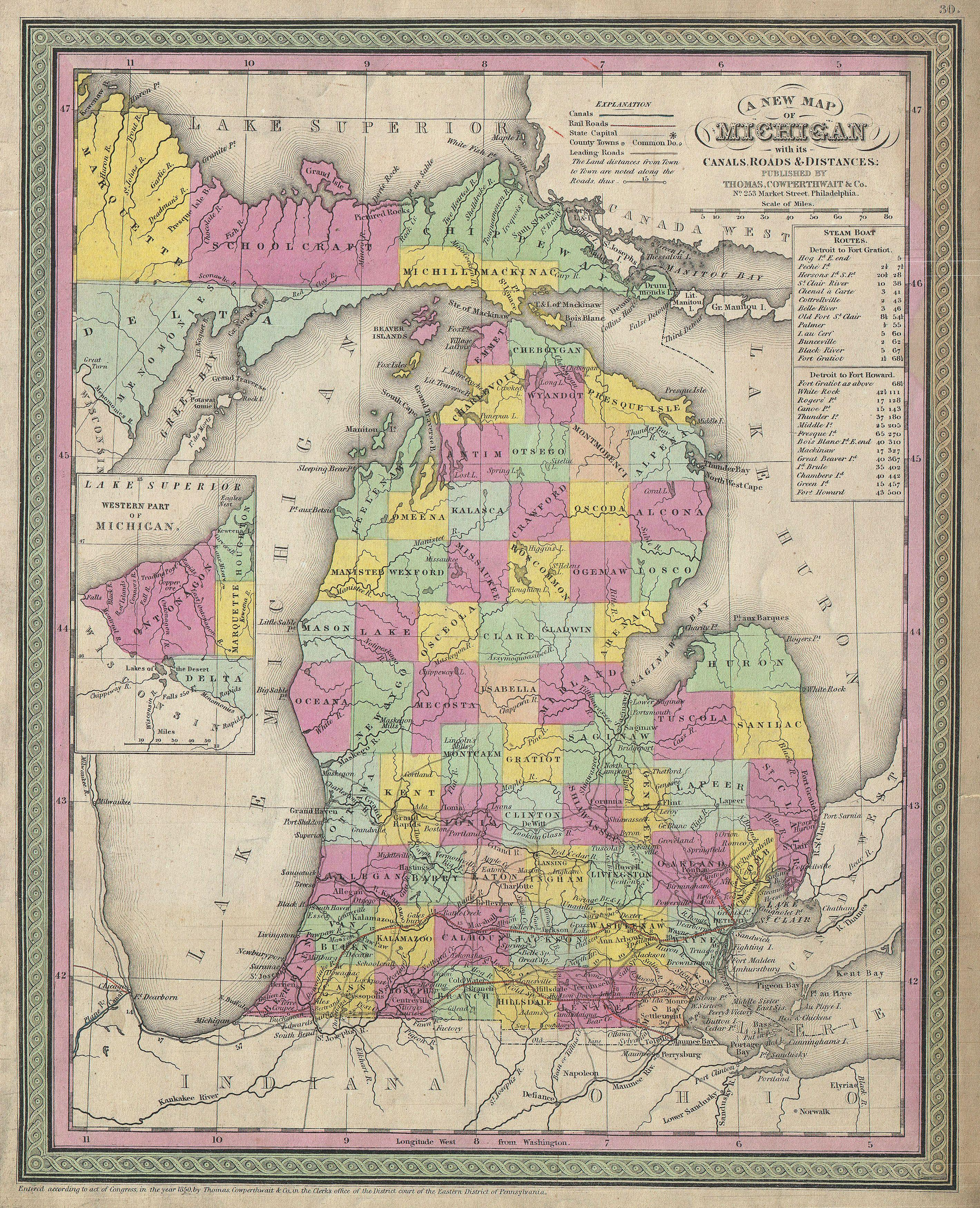
As settlers arrived between 1840 and 1853, the state broke up the single Michilimackinac County and established platted counties across Northern Michigan.

== Geography ==
According to the U.S. Census Bureau, the county has a total area of 2,101 square miles (5,440 km^{2}), of which 1,022 square miles (2,650 km^{2}) is land and 1,079 square miles (2,790 km^{2}) (51%) is water. Mackinac County lies at the boundary of Lake Huron and Lake Michigan.

St. Ignace is the northern terminus of the Mackinac Bridge. Mackinac Island is within the county.

Due to its sparse population, the county has no weather stations.

=== Adjacent counties ===
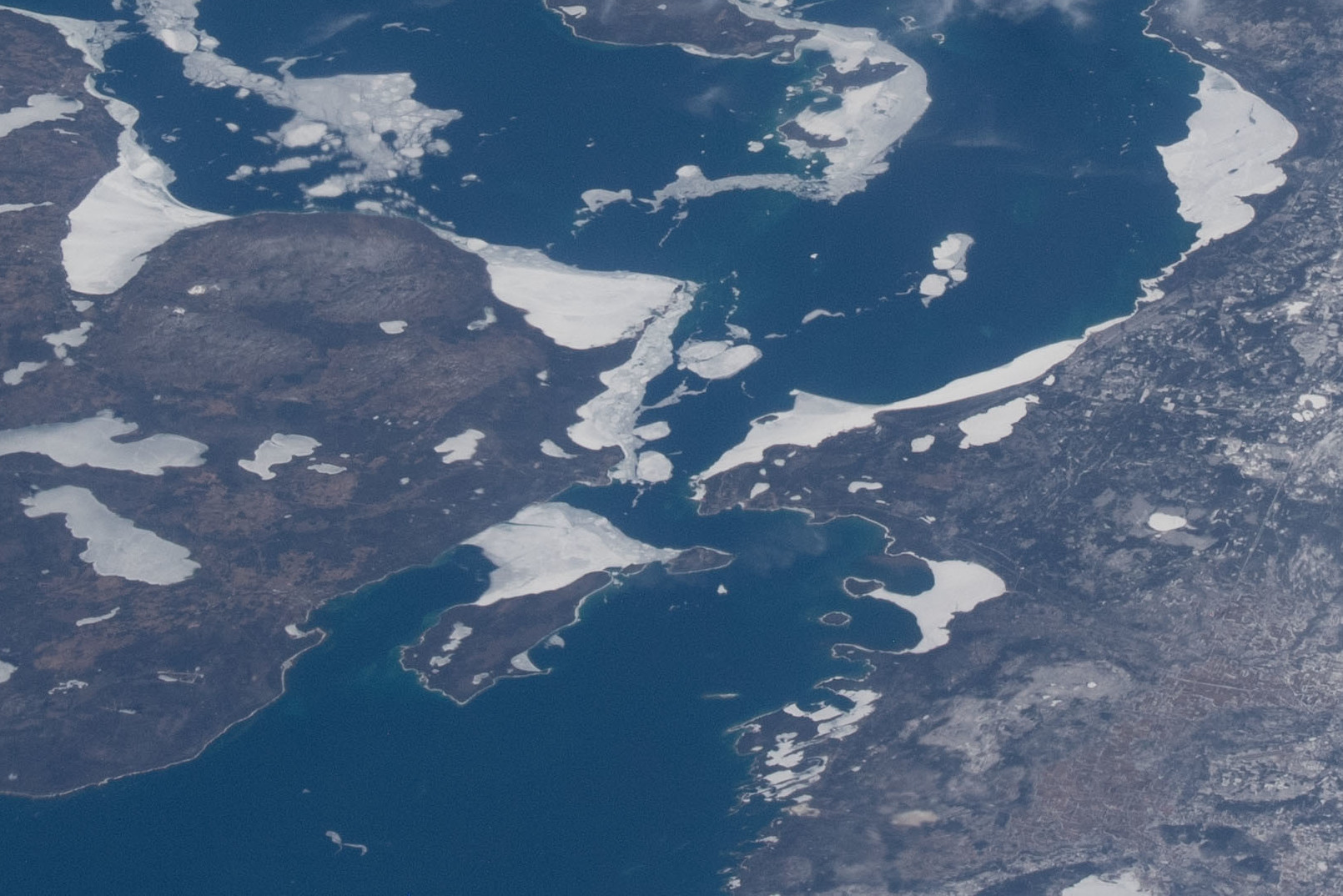
Taken on April 10, 2022, during Expedition 67 of the International Space Station; north is oriented to the right. Mackinac County's border with Emmet and Charlevoix counties is at the center.

By land

- Chippewa County (northeast)
- Luce County (northwest)
- Schoolcraft County (west)

By water

- Presque Isle County (southeast)
- Cheboygan County (south)
- Emmet County (south)
- Charlevoix County (southwest)

=== National protected area ===
- Hiawatha National Forest (part)

== Communities ==
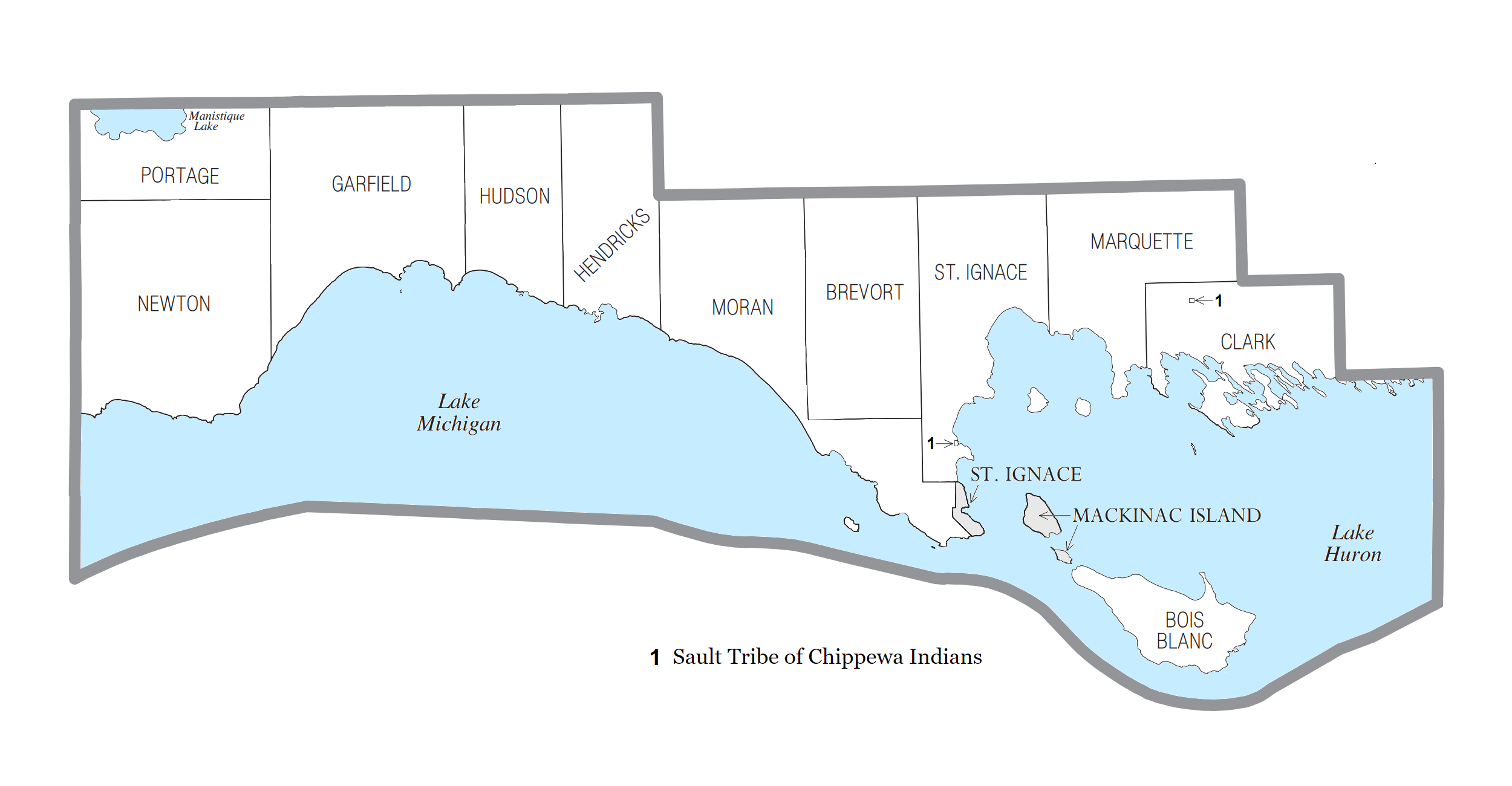
U.S. Census data map showing local municipal boundaries within Mackinac County. Shaded areas represent incorporated cities.

=== Cities ===
- Mackinac Island
- St. Ignace (county seat)

=== Civil townships ===
- Bois Blanc Township
- Brevort Township
- Clark Township
- Garfield Township
- Hendricks Township
- Holmes Township (Defunct)
- Hudson Township
- Marquette Township
- Moran Township
- Newton Township
- Portage Township
- St. Ignace Township

=== Census-designated place ===
- Naubinway

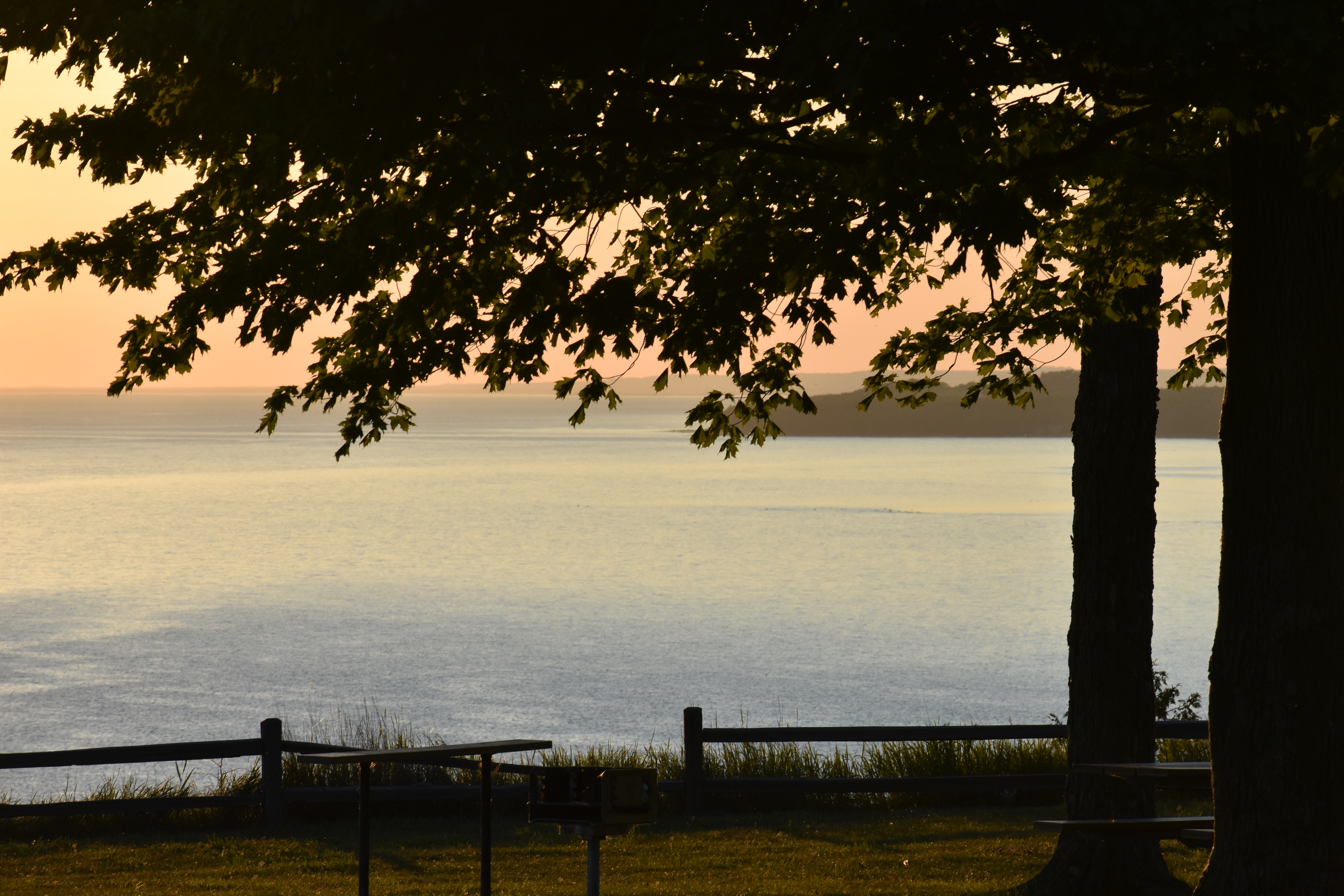
The coastline along Gros Cap, Michigan, in Moran Township, at sunset

=== Unincorporated communities ===
- Allenville
- Brevort
- Caffey
- Caffey Corner
- Cedarville
- Charles
- Curtis
- Engadine
- Epoufette
- Evergreen Shores
- Garnet
- Gilchrist
- Gould City
- Gros Cap
- Hessel
- Huntspur
- Kenneth
- Millecoquins
- Moran
- Ozark
- Patrick Landing
- Pickford
- Pointe Aux Pins
- Pontchartrain Shores
- Port Dolomite
- Port Inland
- Rexton
- Rockview
- Simmons

=== Indian reservations ===
- Mackinac Bands of Chippewa and Ottawa Indians
- The Sault Tribe of Chippewa Indians, which is headquartered in Sault Ste. Marie in Chippewa County to the north, occupies two small territories within Mackinac County. One is located in St. Ignace Township about 3 miles (4.8 km) north of the city of St. Ignace on the shores of Lake Huron. The other portion is located in rural northwest Clark Township.

== Demographics ==
Historical population
Census	Pop.	Note	%±
1830	877		—
1840	923		5.2%
1850	3,598		289.8%
1860	1,938		−46.1%
1870	1,716		−11.5%
1880	2,902		69.1%
1890	7,830		169.8%
1900	7,703		−1.6%
1910	9,249		20.1%
1920	8,026		−13.2%
1930	8,783		9.4%
1940	9,438		7.5%
1950	9,287		−1.6%
1960	10,853		16.9%
1970	9,660		−11.0%
1980	10,178		5.4%
1990	10,674		4.9%
2000	11,943		11.9%
2010	11,113		−6.9%
2020	10,834		−2.5%
2025 (est.)	11,236	▲	3.7%
U.S. Decennial Census; 1790–1960 1900–1990; 1990–2000 2010–2018

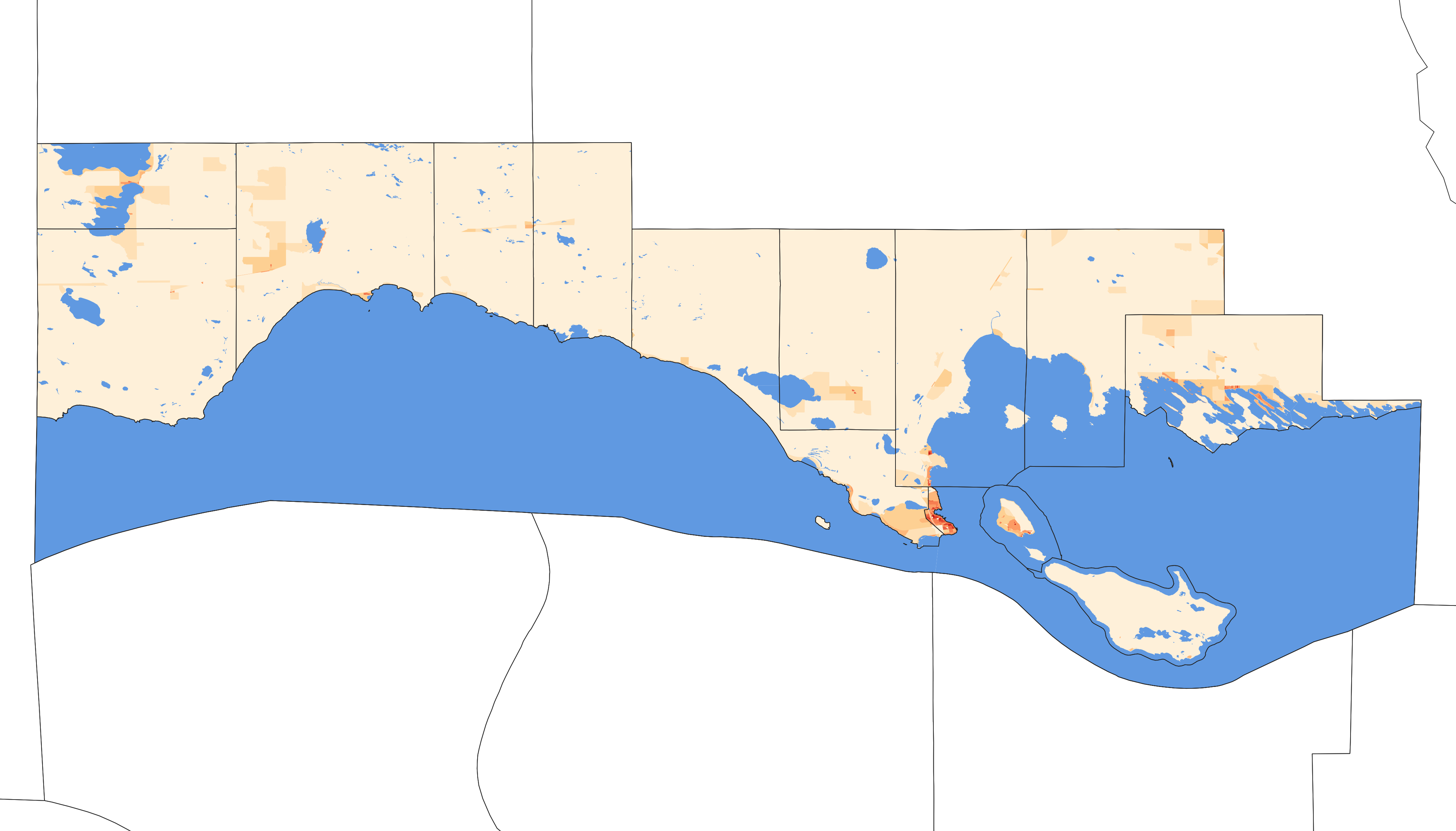
2020 population density of Mackinac County MI by census block

=== Racial and ethnic composition ===
Mackinac County, Michigan – Racial and ethnic composition Note: the US Census treats Hispanic/Latino as an ethnic category. This table excludes Latinos from the racial categories and assigns them to a separate category. Hispanics/Latinos may be of any race.
Race / Ethnicity (NH = Non-Hispanic)	Pop 1980	Pop 1990	Pop 2000	Pop 2010	Pop 2020	% 1980	% 1990	% 2000	% 2010	% 2020
White alone (NH)	9,224	8,933	9,506	8,411	8,015	90.63%	83.69%	79.59%	75.69%	73.98%
Black or African American alone (NH)	5	5	23	57	56	0.05%	0.05%	0.19%	0.51%	0.52%
Native American or Alaska Native alone (NH)	901	1,691	1,683	1,909	1,682	8.85%	15.84%	14.09%	17.18%	15.53%
Asian alone (NH)	13	11	34	22	28	0.13%	0.10%	0.28%	0.20%	0.26%
Native Hawaiian or Pacific Islander alone (NH)	x	x	1	1	0	x	x	0.01%	0.01%	0.00%
Other race alone (NH)	5	1	8	15	34	0.05%	0.01%	0.07%	0.13%	0.31%
Mixed race or Multiracial (NH)	x	x	581	572	852	x	x	4.86%	5.15%	7.86%
Hispanic or Latino (any race)	30	33	107	126	167	0.29%	0.31%	0.90%	1.13%	1.54%
Total	10,178	10,674	11,943	11,113	10,834	100.00%	100.00%	100.00%	100.00%	100.00%

=== 2020 census ===
As of the 2020 census, the county had a population of 10,834. The median age was 53.7 years, 16.3% of residents were under the age of 18, and 29.9% of residents were 65 years of age or older. For every 100 females there were 102.8 males, and for every 100 females age 18 and over there were 100.7 males age 18 and over.

The racial makeup of the county was 74.6% White, 0.6% Black or African American, 15.7% American Indian and Alaska Native, 0.3% Asian, <0.1% Native Hawaiian and Pacific Islander, 0.6% from some other race, and 8.3% from two or more races. Hispanic or Latino residents of any race comprised 1.5% of the population.

25.3% of residents lived in urban areas, while 74.7% lived in rural areas.

There were 5,040 households in the county, of which 20.5% had children under the age of 18 living in them. Of all households, 47.8% were married-couple households, 21.8% were households with a male householder and no spouse or partner present, and 23.0% were households with a female householder and no spouse or partner present. About 33.1% of all households were made up of individuals and 16.6% had someone living alone who was 65 years of age or older.

There were 10,519 housing units, of which 52.1% were vacant. Among occupied housing units, 79.3% were owner-occupied and 20.7% were renter-occupied. The homeowner vacancy rate was 2.6% and the rental vacancy rate was 12.3%.

=== 2010 census ===
As of the 2010 United States census, Mackinac County had a population of 11,113, a decrease of 830 (-6.9%) from the 2000 census. There were 5,024 households and 3,219 families in the county. The population density was 11 per square mile (4.2/km^{2}). There were 11,010 housing units at an average density of 11 per square mile (4.2/km^{2}). Racially, 76.5% of the population were White, 17.3% Native American, 0.5% Black or African American, 0.2% Asian, 0.2% of some other race and 5.3% of two or more races; 1.1% were Hispanic or Latino (of any race). Culturally, 18.5% were of German, 8.8% English, 8.0% French, French Canadian or Cajun, 7.6% Irish and 5.1% Polish ancestry.

In 2010, there were 5,024 households, of which 20.9% had children under the age of 18 living with them, 51.3% were married couples living together, 8.1% had a female householder with no husband present, and 35.9% were non-families. 31.0% of all households were made up of individuals, and 14.3% had someone living alone who was 65 years of age or older. The average household size was 2.19 and the average family size was 2.7. Among them, 18.7% of the population were under the age of 18, 5.5% from 18 to 24, 19.3% from 25 to 44, 34.0% from 45 to 64, and 22.3% who were 65 years of age or older. The median age was 49 years. The population was 50.5% male and 49.5% female.

The median household income was $39,055 and the median family income was $50,984. The per capita income was $22,195. About 10.5% of families and 14.1% of the population were below the poverty line, including 19.3% of those under age 18 and 6.2% of those age 65 or over.

=== Religion ===
Religiously, Christianity is the predominant religion for the county and region of the Upper Peninsula. Mackinac County is part of the Roman Catholic Diocese of Marquette.

== Education ==
School districts include:

K-12:

- Engadine Consolidated Schools
- Les Cheneaux Community Schools
- Mackinac Island Public Schools
- Pickford Public Schools
- Rudyard Area Schools
- St. Ignace Area Schools
- Tahquamenon Area Schools

Elementary:

- Bois Blanc Pines School District
- Moran Township School District

== Media ==
=== Newspapers ===
- The Mackinac Island Town Crier is the weekly seasonal newspaper of Mackinac Island.
- The St. Ignace News is the weekly newspaper for the Upper Peninsula area of the Mackinac Straits.

=== Television ===
The following television stations can be received in St. Ignace:

- Channel 4:WTOM-TV "TV 7&4" (NBC) (Cheboygan) (simulcasted in Channel 7, Harrietta)
- Channel 8:WGTQ "ABC 29&8" (ABC) (Goetzville) (simulcasted in Channel 29, Kalkaska)
- Channel 10:WWUP-TV "9&10 News" (CBS) (Goetzville) (simulcasted in Channel 9, Tustin)

=== Radio ===
The following stations can be heard in St. Ignace:

==== FM ====
Call sign	Frequency	City broadcast from
WIAB	88.5	Mackinaw City
WSBX	94.5	Mackinaw City
WLXT	96.3	Petoskey
WWMK	106.3	Cheboygan
WAWM	98.9	Petoskey
WCBY - W264CF	100.7	St.Ignace, Michigan
WMKC	102.9	Indian River
WCMW	103.9	Harbor Springs
WKHQ	105.9	Petoskey

==== AM ====
Call sign	Frequency	City broadcast from
WTCM	580	Traverse City
WOUF	750	Petoskey
WIDG	940	St. Ignace
WWMN	1100	Petoskey
WCBY	1240	Cheboygan

== Government ==
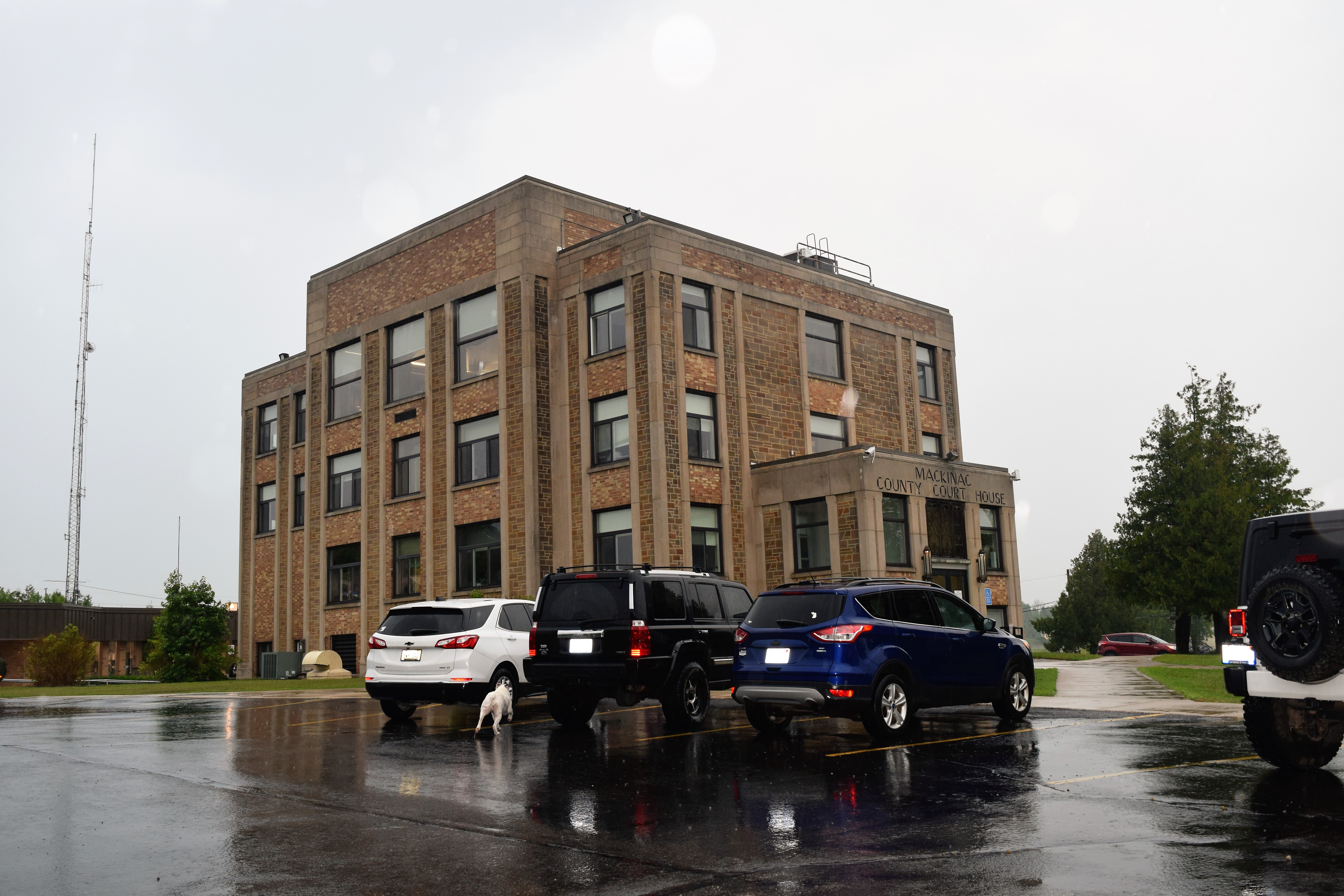
Mackinac County Courthouse in St. Ignace

Mackinac County is reliably Republican. Since the 1964 landslide of Lyndon B. Johnson, it has only supported a Democrat twice, and neither time with a majority of the vote. Bill Clinton won the county in his 1992 and 1996 victories; the latter remains the last time a Democratic presidential candidate has won the county.

United States presidential election results for Mackinac County, Michigan
Year	Republican		Democratic		Third party(ies)	
Year	No.	%	No.	%	No.	%
1876	74	26.62%	204	73.38%	0	0.00%
1880	145	32.88%	296	67.12%	0	0.00%
1884	479	46.06%	558	53.65%	3	0.29%
1888	625	40.24%	913	58.79%	15	0.97%
1892	478	35.41%	855	63.33%	17	1.26%
1896	806	48.73%	804	48.61%	44	2.66%
1900	1,059	61.71%	632	36.83%	25	1.46%
1904	1,191	69.16%	503	29.21%	28	1.63%
1908	1,156	58.89%	769	39.17%	38	1.94%
1912	612	34.63%	730	41.31%	425	24.05%
1916	1,082	53.38%	908	44.80%	37	1.83%
1920	1,685	62.87%	932	34.78%	63	2.35%
1924	1,606	51.62%	998	32.08%	507	16.30%
1928	1,879	57.94%	1,355	41.78%	9	0.28%
1932	1,504	36.60%	2,578	62.74%	27	0.66%
1936	1,984	45.65%	2,286	52.60%	76	1.75%
1940	2,591	55.38%	2,075	44.35%	13	0.28%
1944	2,268	60.06%	1,488	39.41%	20	0.53%
1948	2,182	64.90%	1,138	33.85%	42	1.25%
1952	3,058	70.23%	1,285	29.51%	11	0.25%
1956	3,279	67.99%	1,540	31.93%	4	0.08%
1960	3,064	59.88%	2,042	39.91%	11	0.21%
1964	1,967	41.70%	2,748	58.26%	2	0.04%
1968	2,507	54.77%	1,751	38.26%	319	6.97%
1972	3,096	60.66%	1,937	37.95%	71	1.39%
1976	3,107	55.22%	2,452	43.58%	68	1.21%
1980	3,021	52.23%	2,262	39.11%	501	8.66%
1984	3,627	64.85%	1,949	34.85%	17	0.30%
1988	3,127	59.65%	2,093	39.93%	22	0.42%
1992	2,278	38.11%	2,293	38.36%	1,406	23.52%
1996	2,281	39.59%	2,700	46.86%	781	13.55%
2000	3,272	54.81%	2,533	42.43%	165	2.76%
2004	3,706	56.16%	2,819	42.72%	74	1.12%
2008	3,268	50.99%	3,027	47.23%	114	1.78%
2012	3,397	55.53%	2,652	43.35%	68	1.11%
2016	3,744	60.94%	2,085	33.94%	315	5.13%
2020	4,304	61.27%	2,632	37.47%	89	1.27%
2024	4,476	61.84%	2,675	36.96%	87	1.20%

United States Senate election results for Mackinac County, Michigan1
Year	Republican		Democratic		Third party(ies)	
Year	No.	%	No.	%	No.	%
2024	4,326	60.90%	2,613	36.78%	165	2.32%

Michigan Gubernatorial election results for Mackinac County
Year	Republican		Democratic		Third party(ies)	
Year	No.	%	No.	%	No.	%
2022	3,325	55.43%	2,567	42.79%	107	1.78%

The county government operates the jail, maintains rural roads, operates the major local courts, keeps files of deeds and mortgages, maintains vital records, administers public health regulations, and participates with the state in the provision of welfare and other social services. The county board of commissioners controls the budget but has only limited authority to make laws or ordinances. In Michigan, most local government functions — police and fire, building and zoning, tax assessment, street maintenance, etc. — are the responsibility of individual cities and townships.

=== Elected officials ===
- Prosecuting Attorney: J. Stuart Spencer
- Sheriff: Edward Wilk
- County Clerk: Hillary Vowell
- County Treasurer: Jennifer Goudreau
- Register of Deeds: Mary Jo Savard
- County Surveyor: Jeffrey M. Davis

(information as of April 2015)

== Historical markers ==
There are 34 official state historical markers in the county:

- Across the Peninsula
- American Fur Company Store
- Battlefield of 1814
- Biddle House
- Bois Blanc Island
- British Cannon
- British Landing
- Early Missionary Bark Chapel
- Epoufette
- Fort de Buade
- Fort Holmes
- Grand Hotel
- Gros Cap Island & St. Helena Island
- Historic Fort Mackinac
- Indian Dormitory
- Island House (Mackinac Island)
- Lake Michigan
- Lake View Hotel
- Little Stone Church
- Mackinac Conference
- Mackinac Island
- Mackinac Straits
- Market Street
- Mission Church
- Mission House
- Northernmost Point of Lake Michigan
- Old Agency House
- Round Island Lighthouse
- Sainte Anne Church
- St. Ignace
- St. Ignace Mission
- Skull Cave
- Trinity Church (Mackinac Island)
- Wawashkamo Golf Club

== Transportation ==
=== Airports ===
The Mackinac County Airport (83D) in St. Ignace and Mackinac Island Airport (MCD) on Mackinac Island are located within Mackinac County. The nearest airports with scheduled commercial passenger service are Chippewa County International Airport (CIU) in Sault Ste. Marie and Pellston Regional Airport (PLN).

=== Major highways ===
- I-75
- BL I-75
- US 2
- M-48
- M-117
- M-123
- M-129
- M-134
- M-185
- H-33
- H-40
- H-42
- H-57
- H-63

M-185 does not allow motor vehicles with the exception of emergency vehicles and service vehicles.

=== Ferry ===
Numerous companies operate ferries to Bois Blanc Island and Mackinac Island. Ferries to and from Mackinac Island sail from St. Ignace and Mackinaw City, while the Bois Blanc Island ferry sails from Cheboygan.

=== Rail ===
- Canadian National Railway

== Attractions ==
- British Landing
- Fort Mackinac
- Garlyn Zoo
- Straits State Park
- Deer Ranch
- Castle Rock (Michigan)

== See also ==
- List of Michigan State Historic Sites in Mackinac County
- National Register of Historic Places listings in Mackinac County, Michigan

== Bibliography ==
- "Bibliography on Mackinac County". Clarke Historical Library, Central Michigan University.
- Wood, Edwin Orin (1918). Historic Mackinac : the historical, picturesque and legendary features of the Mackinac country : illustrated from sketches, drawings, maps and photographs, with an original map of Mackinac Island, made especially for this work: in two volumes. Vol. 1. New York: Macmillan.
- Wood, Edwin Orin (1918). Historic Mackinac : the historical, picturesque and legendary features of the Mackinac country : illustrated from sketches, drawings, maps and photographs, with an original map of Mackinac Island, made especially for this work: in two volumes. Vol. 2. New York: Macmillan.
