= Pickford, Michigan =

- Unincorporated community
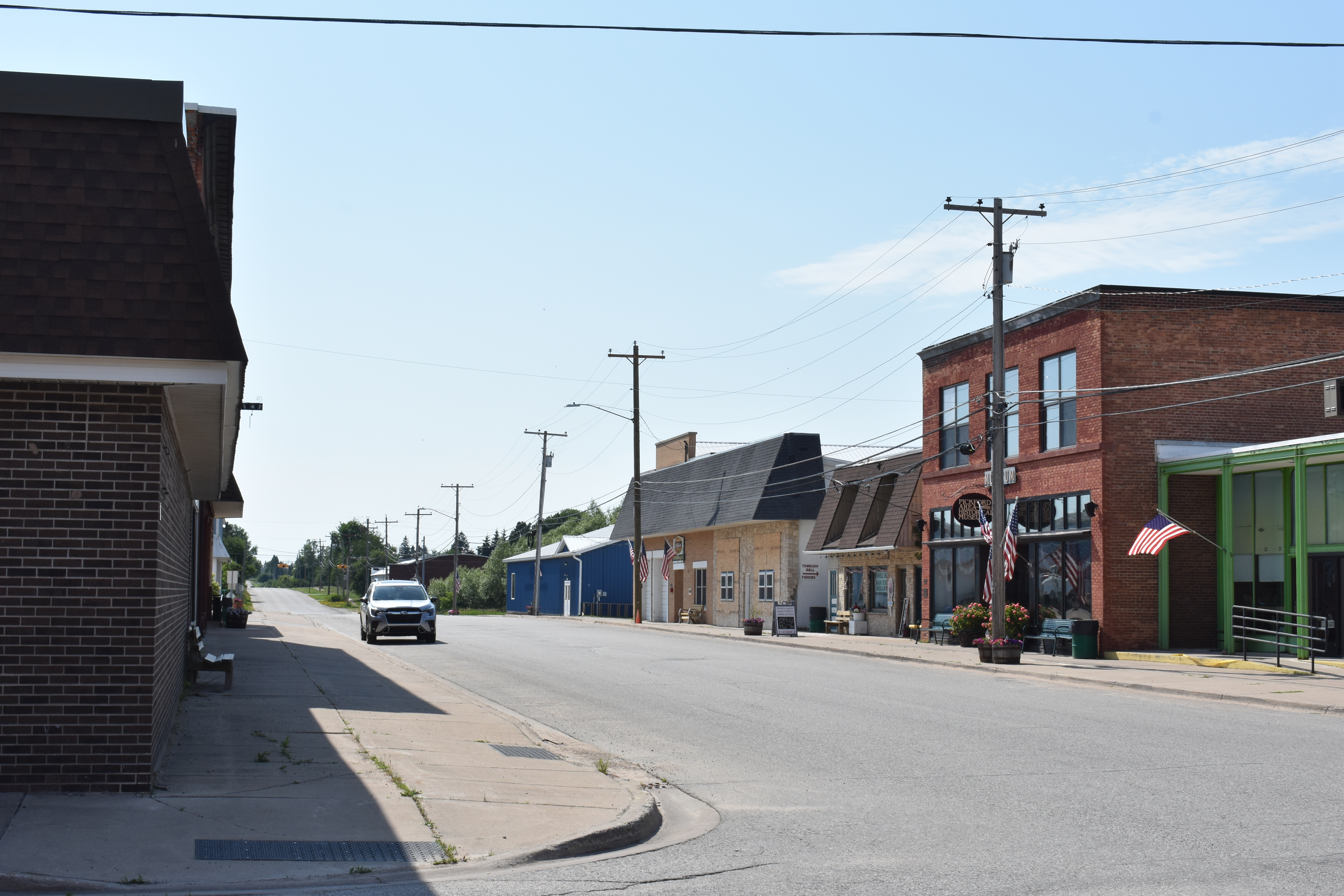
- Looking west along E. Main Street

- Location within the state of Michigan Location within the United States
- Coordinates: 46°09′28″N 84°21′49″W
- Country: United States
- State: Michigan
- County: Chippewa and Mackinac
- Township: Marquette and Pickford
- Settled: 1877
- Elevation: 604 ft (184 m)
- Time zone: UTC-5 (Eastern (EST))
  - Summer (DST): UTC-4 (EDT)
- ZIP code(s): 49774
- Area code: 906
- GNIS feature ID: 634810

Pickford is an unincorporated community in the U.S. state of Michigan. The community is centered along M-129 and is divided between Chippewa County to the east and Mackinac County.

As an unincorporated community, Pickford has no legally defined boundaries or population statistics of its own but does have its own post office with the 49774 ZIP Code.

== History ==
Pickford was established in 1877 when Charles W. Pickford from Ontario first settled here along the Munuscong River. A post office was established in February 1880.

== Geography ==
Pickford is located in the eastern Upper Peninsula of Michigan. Three quarters of the community is located within Chippewa County, while the southwestern quadrant of the community is located within Mackinac County. Pickford lies about 22 miles (35 km) south of Sault Ste. Marie.

=== Major highways ===
- M-48 / M-129 is a highway concurrency that runs north–south through the community. The roadway, known as "Meridian Road", follows the Michigan meridian. M-48 can be used to access Interstate 75 to the west, and M-129 can be used to access Sault Ste. Marie to the north.

== Education ==
Pickford is served by Pickford Public Schools. The district operates a public school within the community, with school teams known as the "Panthers".
