= DeTour Village, Michigan =

- Village
- Village of DeTour
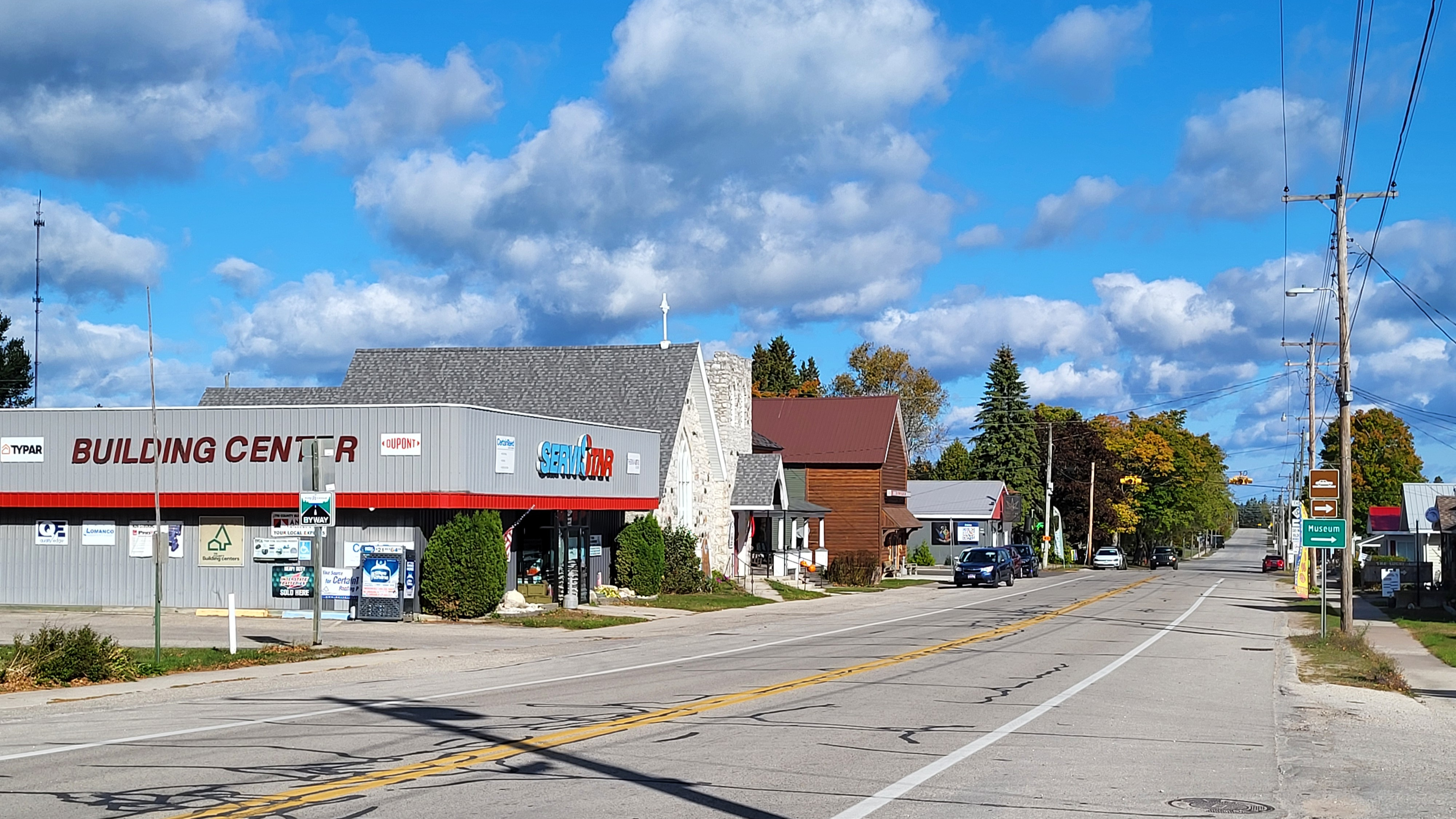
- Looking north along Ontario Street (M-134)

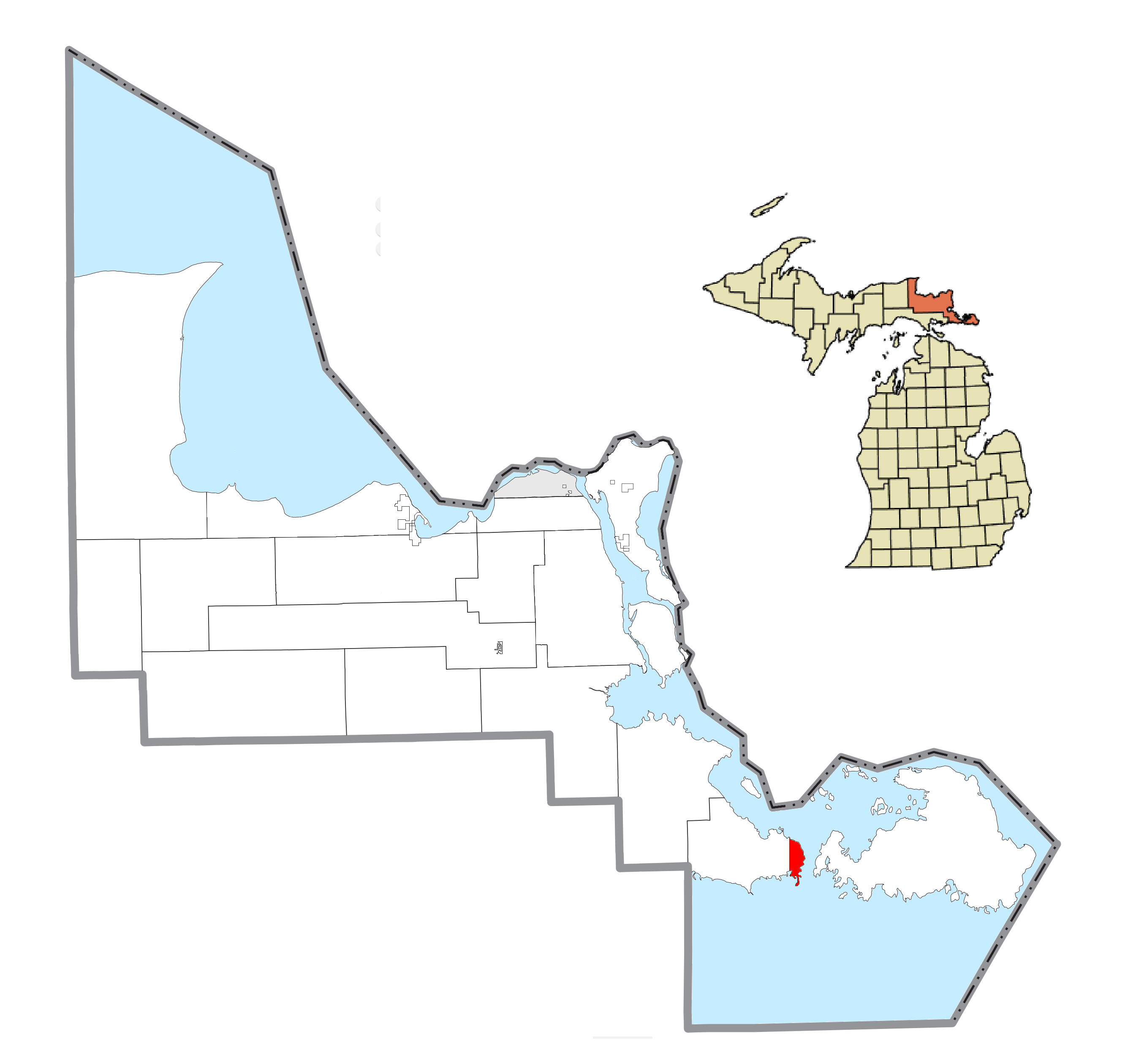
- Location within Chippewa County

- Location within the state of Michigan Location within the United States
- Coordinates: 45°59′52″N 83°54′12″W
- Country: United States
- State: Michigan
- County: Chippewa
- Township: DeTour
- Incorporated: 1899

Government
  - Type: Village council

Area
  - Total: 8.38 sq mi (21.70 km^{2})
  - Land: 3.54 sq mi (9.18 km^{2})
  - Water: 4.83 sq mi (12.52 km^{2})
- Elevation: 600 ft (180 m)

Population (2020)
  - Total: 263
  - Density: 74.2/sq mi (28.66/km^{2})
- Time zone: UTC-5 (Eastern (EST))
  - Summer (DST): UTC-4 (EDT)
- ZIP code(s): 49725
- Area code: 906
- FIPS code: 26-21780
- GNIS feature ID: 0624391
- Website: Official website

DeTour Village (/di.tuər/ DEE-tu-ər) is a village in Chippewa County in the U.S. state of Michigan. The population was 263 at the 2020 census.

The village is at the extreme eastern tip of the Upper Peninsula of Michigan, in Detour Township, at the turning point for the shipping channel connecting the St. Mary's River with Lake Huron and the Straits of Mackinac. Drummond Island, one of the largest islands in the St. Mary's River, is only one mile across the river from DeTour. The DeTour Reef Light is nearby.

== History ==
The place was originally an Ojibwe settlement. It was connected with the fur trade and over time it came to have a large Metis population. Over time the Metis inhabitants were redefined as being French-Canadian.

The area was organized in 1850 as Warren Township, named after Ebenezer Warren, the first postmaster of the township. The settlement was called Warrenville on an 1848 map. The name was changed to Detour in 1856 when a new postmaster, Henry A. Williams, assumed office. It incorporated as a village in 1899. The spelling was changed to "DeTour" in 1953 and the post office was renamed "DeTour Village" in 1961.

M-134 runs through the village, connecting with I-75 43 miles (69 km) to the west and with M-129 25 miles (40 km) to the west, which runs north 37 miles (60 km) to Sault Ste. Marie. M-134 also continues east to Drummond Island via the Drummond Island Ferry.

== Geography ==
According to the United States Census Bureau, the village has a total area of 8.38 square miles (21.70 km^{2}), of which 3.55 square miles (9.19 km^{2}) is land and 4.83 square miles (12.51 km^{2}) is water.

=== Climate ===
Climate data for DeTour Village, Michigan (1991–2020 normals, extremes 1900–present)
| Month | Jan | Feb | Mar | Apr | May | Jun | Jul | Aug | Sep | Oct | Nov | Dec | Year |
|---|---|---|---|---|---|---|---|---|---|---|---|---|---|
| Record high °F (°C) | 53 (12) | 52 (11) | 62 (17) | 85 (29) | 88 (31) | 96 (36) | 102 (39) | 95 (35) | 91 (33) | 88 (31) | 70 (21) | 58 (14) | 102 (39) |
| Mean daily maximum °F (°C) | 23.9 (−4.5) | 25.6 (−3.6) | 34.1 (1.2) | 45.9 (7.7) | 59.3 (15.2) | 69.9 (21.1) | 75.0 (23.9) | 74.0 (23.3) | 66.1 (18.9) | 52.9 (11.6) | 40.9 (4.9) | 30.9 (−0.6) | 49.9 (9.9) |
| Daily mean °F (°C) | 16.3 (−8.7) | 17.2 (−8.2) | 25.5 (−3.6) | 37.9 (3.3) | 50.4 (10.2) | 60.8 (16.0) | 66.3 (19.1) | 66.0 (18.9) | 58.7 (14.8) | 46.3 (7.9) | 35.2 (1.8) | 24.9 (−3.9) | 42.1 (5.6) |
| Mean daily minimum °F (°C) | 8.7 (−12.9) | 8.7 (−12.9) | 17.0 (−8.3) | 29.9 (−1.2) | 41.5 (5.3) | 51.6 (10.9) | 57.6 (14.2) | 58.0 (14.4) | 51.3 (10.7) | 39.7 (4.3) | 29.6 (−1.3) | 18.8 (−7.3) | 34.4 (1.3) |
| Record low °F (°C) | −28 (−33) | −39 (−39) | −32 (−36) | 1 (−17) | 11 (−12) | 32 (0) | 38 (3) | 36 (2) | 27 (−3) | 19 (−7) | −5 (−21) | −24 (−31) | −39 (−39) |
| Average precipitation inches (mm) | 1.93 (49) | 1.31 (33) | 1.75 (44) | 2.44 (62) | 2.62 (67) | 3.06 (78) | 3.07 (78) | 3.35 (85) | 3.61 (92) | 3.83 (97) | 2.58 (66) | 2.32 (59) | 31.87 (809) |
| Average snowfall inches (cm) | 20.2 (51) | 13.9 (35) | 12.0 (30) | 4.6 (12) | 0.0 (0.0) | 0.0 (0.0) | 0.0 (0.0) | 0.0 (0.0) | 0.0 (0.0) | 0.3 (0.76) | 5.7 (14) | 17.9 (45) | 74.6 (189) |
| Average precipitation days (≥ 0.01 in) | 12.8 | 9.3 | 9.2 | 9.5 | 10.8 | 9.9 | 10.8 | 10.5 | 11.3 | 13.2 | 11.1 | 12.3 | 130.7 |
| Average snowy days (≥ 0.1 in) | 11.1 | 8.6 | 6.7 | 2.6 | 0.1 | 0.0 | 0.0 | 0.0 | 0.0 | 0.2 | 3.8 | 9.4 | 42.5 |
Source: NOAA

== Demographics ==
Historical population
| Census | Pop. | Note | %± |
|---|---|---|---|
| 1900 | 880 | | — |
| 1910 | 721 | | −18.1% |
| 1920 | 612 | | −15.1% |
| 1930 | 616 | | 0.7% |
| 1940 | 595 | | −3.4% |
| 1950 | 611 | | 2.7% |
| 1960 | 669 | | 9.5% |
| 1970 | 494 | | −26.2% |
| 1980 | 466 | | −5.7% |
| 1990 | 407 | | −12.7% |
| 2000 | 421 | | 3.4% |
| 2010 | 325 | | −22.8% |
| 2020 | 263 | | −19.1% |
U.S. Decennial Census

== Major highways ==
- M-134
