= Munuscong Lake =

Lake in the state of Michigan, United States

- Location within Michigan
- Location: Chippewa County, Michigan and Algoma District, Ontario
- Coordinates: 46.167°N 84.083°W
- Type: Lake
- Primary outflows: Lake Huron
- Surface elevation: 581 feet (177 m)

Munuscong Lake (/ˈmjuːnəskɔːŋ/ MEW-nəss-kong) is a section of the St. Marys River in Chippewa County in the U.S. state of Michigan, with the northeastern edge of the lake forming part of the riparian bottomland in Algoma District in the Canadian province of Ontario. Hydrologically the lake and river section are an arm of Lake Huron, and Munuscong Lake thus shares a common water level with the Great Lake into which it flows.

Munuscong Lake is bounded by the Upper Peninsula, Neebish Island in Michigan, and St. Joseph Island in Ontario. The lake's surveyed elevation, like Lake Huron, is 581 feet (177 m) above sea level. It drains via the DeTour Passage into Lake Huron.
