= Marquette Township, Mackinac County, Michigan =

Marquette Township, Michigan
- Civil township
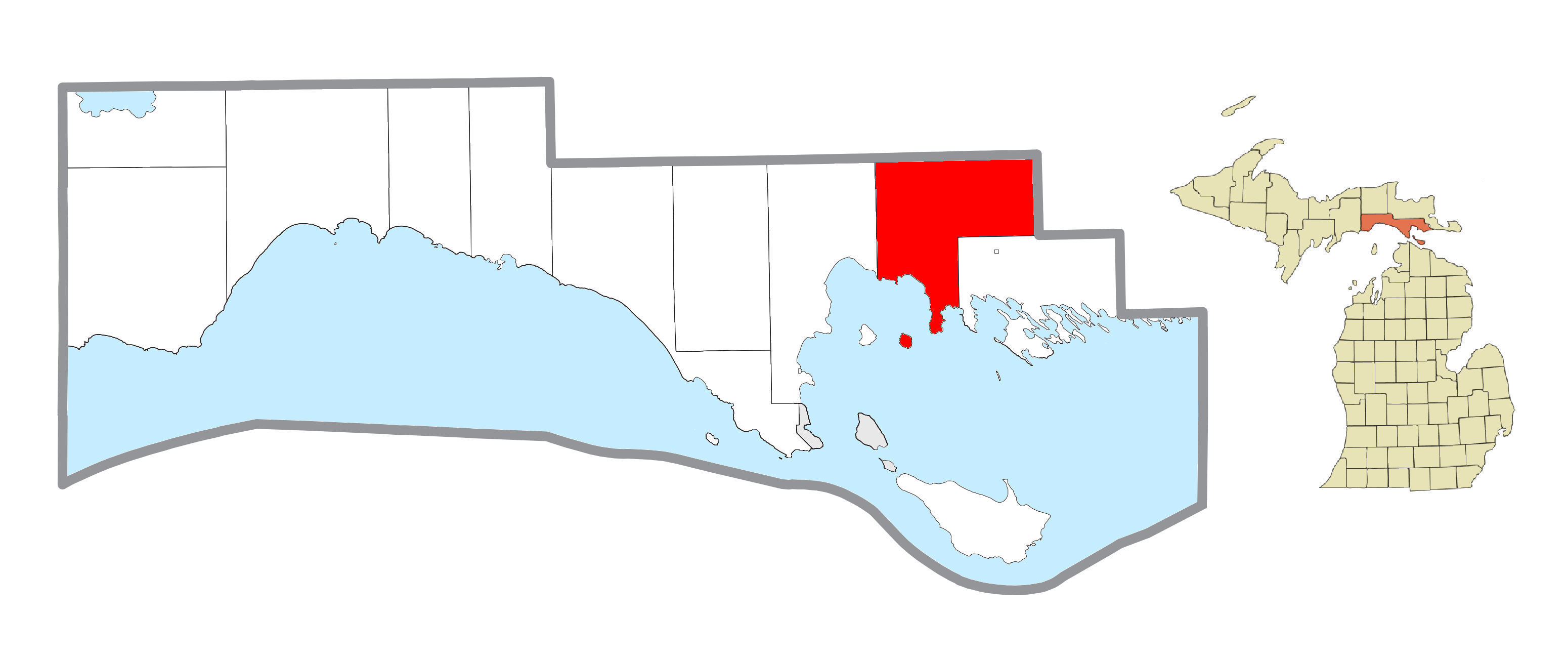
- Location within Mackinac County

- Location within the state of Michigan Location within the United States
- Coordinates: 46°05′52″N 84°31′16″W
- Country: United States
- State: Michigan
- County: Mackinac

Government
  - Supervisor: Julia Kronemeyer
  - Clerk: Renae Leese

Area
  - Total: 136.16 sq mi (352.7 km^{2})
  - Land: 97.17 sq mi (251.7 km^{2})
  - Water: 38.99 sq mi (101.0 km^{2})
- Elevation: 646 ft (197 m)

Population (2020)
  - Total: 611
  - Density: 6.29/sq mi (2.43/km^{2})
- Time zone: UTC-5 (Eastern (EST))
  - Summer (DST): UTC-4 (EDT)
- ZIP Codes: 49745 (Hessel); 49774 (Pickford); 49780 (Rudyard)
- Area code: 906
- FIPS code: 26-51880
- GNIS feature ID: 1626696
- Website: Official website

Marquette Township is a civil township of Mackinac County in the U.S. state of Michigan. The population was 611 as of the 2020 census.

== Geography ==
The township is in eastern Mackinac County on the northern shore of Lake Huron. It is bordered to the west by St. Ignace Township and to the southeast by Clark Township, both in Mackinac County. Rudyard Township is to the north and Pickford Township is to the northeast, both in Chippewa County.

According to the U.S. Census Bureau, Marquette Township has a total area of 136.16 square miles (352.65 km^{2}), of which 97.17 square miles (251.67 km^{2}) are land and 38.99 square miles (100.98 km^{2}), or 28.64%, are water, consisting of bays on Lake Huron.

== Communities ==
- The unincorporated community of Pickford lies partially in the northeast corner of the township. The community lies primarily within Pickford Township in Chippewa County.
