= Munuscong River =

River in Michigan

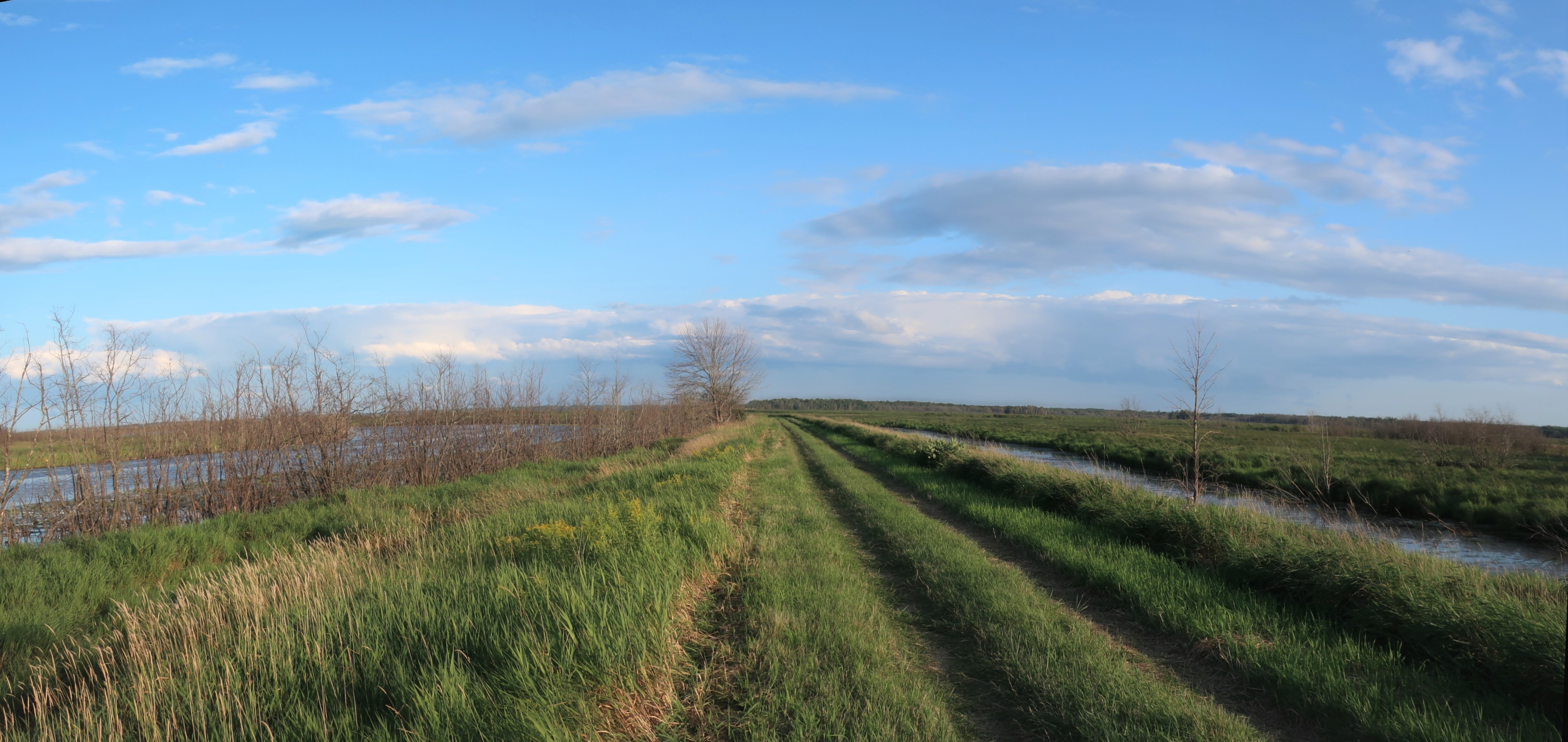

Location
- Country: United States

Physical characteristics
- Source
  - location: Michigan
- Mouth
  - location: 46°12′24″N 84°15′00″W

The Munuscong River (/ˈmjuːnəskɔːŋ/ MEW-nəss-kong) is a 31.8-mile-long (51.2 km) river on the Upper Peninsula of Michigan in the United States. It is a tributary of Munuscong Lake, which is part of the St. Marys River waterway and an arm of Lake Huron.

== See also ==
- List of rivers of Michigan
