= Clark Township, Michigan =

- Civil township
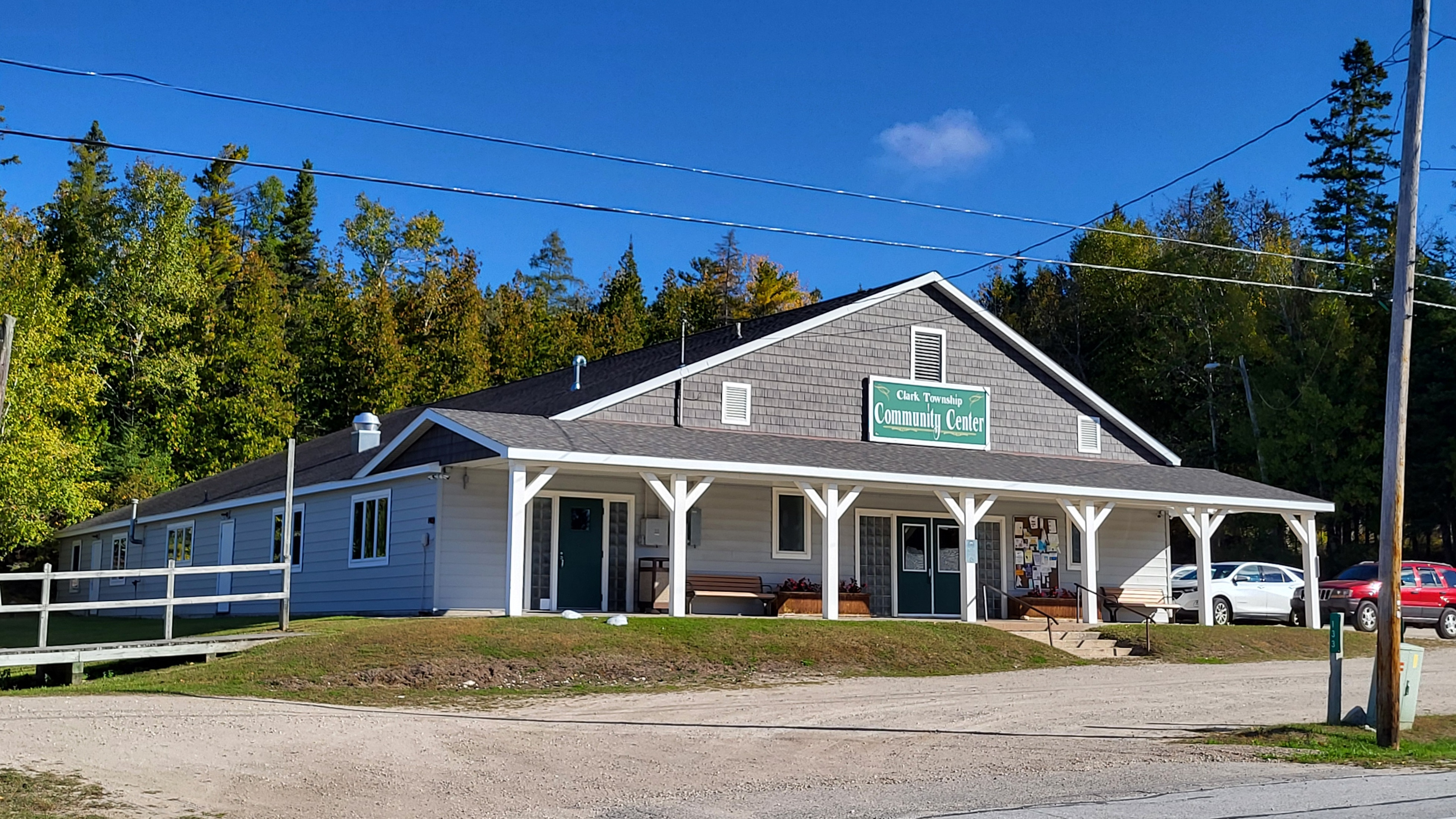
- Clark Township Community Center

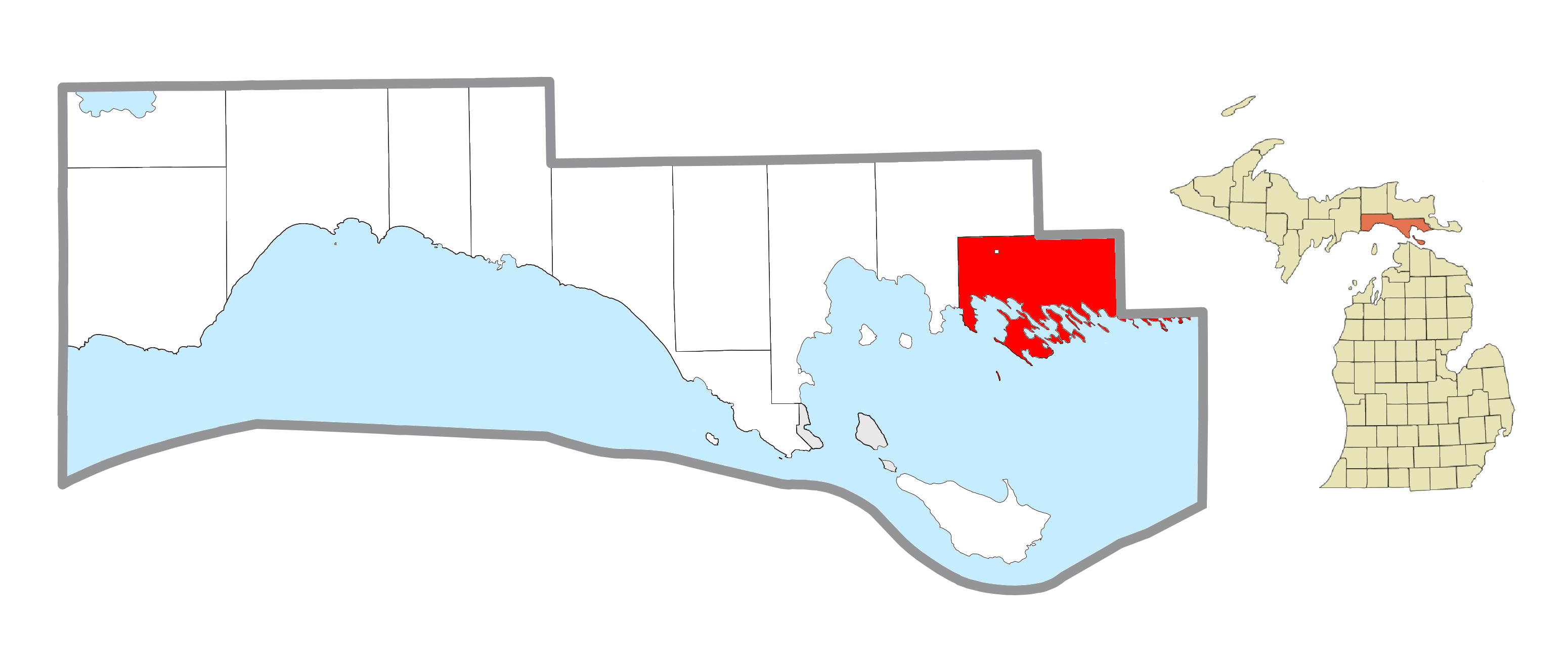
- Location within Mackinac County

- Location within the state of Michigan Location within the United States
- Coordinates: 45°59′57″N 84°20′41″W
- Country: United States
- State: Michigan
- County: Mackinac
- Established: 1905

Government
  - Supervisor: Mark Clymer
  - Clerk: Susan Rutledge

Area
  - Total: 101.60 sq mi (263.14 km^{2})
  - Land: 78.97 sq mi (204.53 km^{2})
  - Water: 22.63 sq mi (58.61 km^{2})
- Elevation: 673 ft (205 m)

Population (2020)
  - Total: 1,917
  - Density: 26/sq mi (10/km^{2})
- Time zone: UTC-5 (Eastern (EST))
  - Summer (DST): UTC-4 (EDT)
- ZIP Code(s): 49719 (Cedarville); 49745 (Hessel)
- Area code: 906
- FIPS code: 26-097-16060
- GNIS feature ID: 1626088
- Website: Official website

Clark Township is a civil township of Mackinac County in the U.S. state of Michigan. The population was 1,917 at the 2020 census.

== History ==
Clark Township was established in February 1905 by the consolidation of Sherwood Township and Cedar Township. Cedar Township was established in March 1887.

== Geography ==
Clark Township is the easternmost township in Mackinac County. It is bordered to the west and northwest by Marquette Township, to the northeast by Chippewa County, and to the south by Lake Huron.

According to the U.S. Census Bureau, the township has a total area of 101.60 square miles (263.14 km^{2}), of which 78.97 square miles (204.53 km^{2}) are land and 22.63 square miles (58.61 km^{2}) (22.27%) are water. The southern part of the township is home to numerous bays and inlets of Lake Huron, as well the Les Cheneaux Islands.

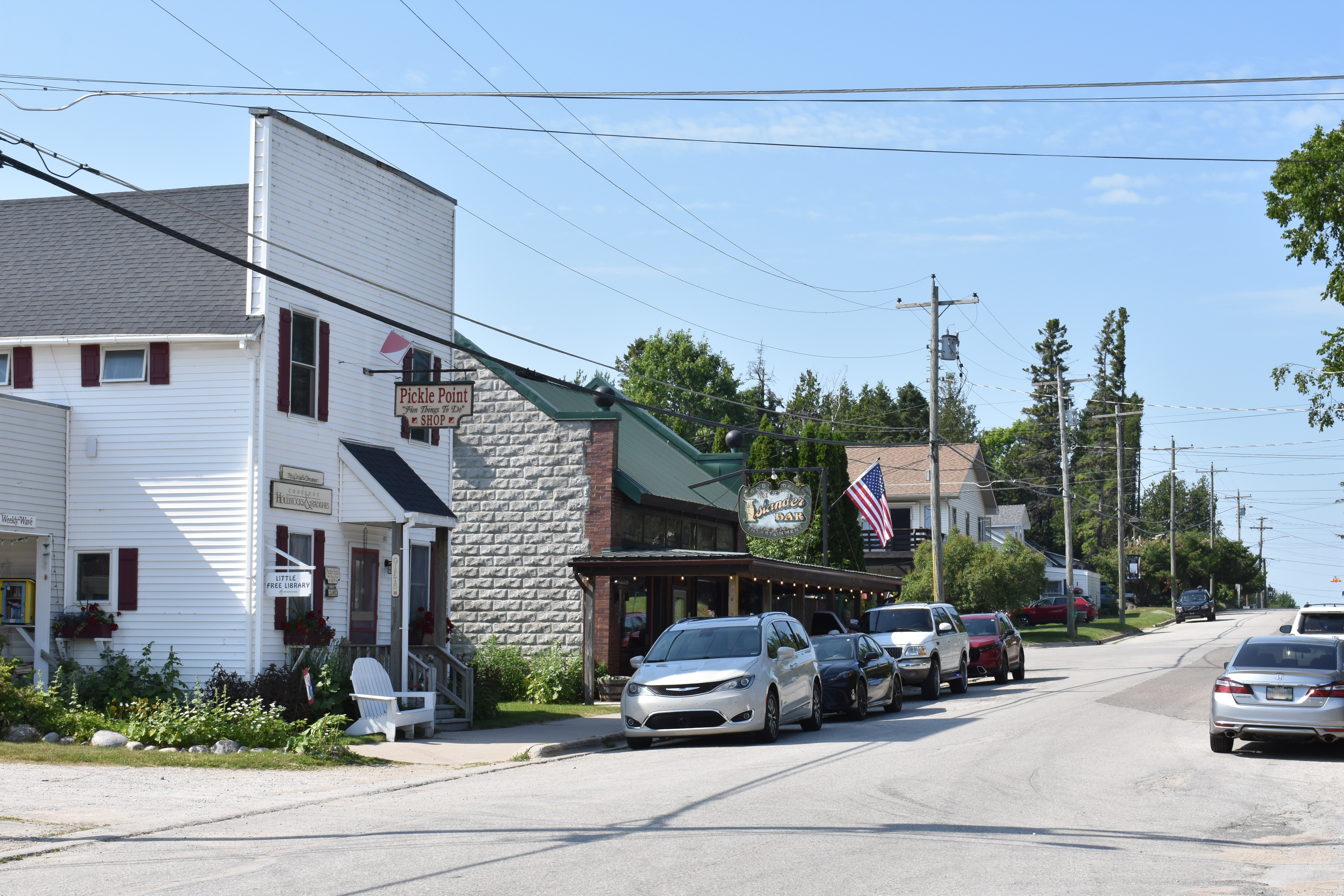
Hessel, Michigan

=== Communities ===
- Cedarville is an unincorporated community at the junction of M-129 and M-134 at 45°59′53″N 84°21′47″W north of the Les Cheneaux Islands, about 2 miles (3 km) east of Hessel, and about 35 miles (56 km) due south of Sault Ste. Marie. It began as a lumber settlement on the Lake Huron shore in 1884. A post office was established in July 1888. The ZIP code of 49719 serves most of Clark Township. The Les Cheneaux Historical Association runs the Historical Museum and the Maritime Museum, both in Cedarville.
- Coryell Islands in this township had a post office from 1908 until 1958.
- Hessel is an unincorporated community on M-134 north of Marquette Island, the largest of the Les Cheneaux Islands at 46°00′15″N 84°25′33″W. It was founded in 1885 by two Swedes and a Norwegian, John and Carl Hessel and John A. Johnson, and a post office was established in September 1888. The ZIP code of 49745 serves Hessel and the western part of Clark Township. Hessel is the home of the Antique Wooden Boat Show and Festival of the Arts, which is held annually at the public docks on the second weekend of August. Les Cheneaux Culinary School is also there.
- Patrick Landing is a named place in the township approximately one mile southwest of Cedarville on the Les Cheneaux Channel at 45°59′05″N 84°22′38″W.
- Port Dolomite is a commercial port in the eastern end of the township at 45°59′05″N 84°16′30″W. In 2004, it was the 93rd largest port in the United States ranked by tonnage.

== Education ==
The entire township is served by Les Cheneaux Community Schools which is within the township in Cedarville. The Public school provides K-12 services.
