= Brevoort =

Brevoort or Brevort may refer to:

== Places ==
- Bredevoort (in Low Saxon: Brevoort), Aalten, Netherlands
- Brevoort Houses, Brooklyn, New York City
- Brevoort Island, Nunavut, Canada
- Brevoort Park, Saskatoon, Saskatchewan, Canada

=== Michigan ===
- Brevoort Lake
- Brevoort River
- Brevort, Michigan
- Brevort Township, Michigan
- Little Brevoort River

== People ==
- J. Carson Brevoort (1818–1887), American collector of rare books and coins
- James Renwick Brevoort (1832–1918), American landscape painter
- Meta Brevoort (1825–1876), American mountain climber
- Tom Brevoort, American comic book editor
- Augustus Brevoort Woodward, (1774–1827), first Chief Justice of the Michigan Territory
- Christian Brevoort Zabriskie (1864–1936), American businessman
