= Cut River =

The Cut River may refer to one of the following rivers:

- Cut River (Mackinac County, Michigan), a river in the Upper Peninsula of Michigan
  - Cut River Bridge, carries U.S. Route 2 over the Cut River
- Cuț River, a tributary of the Tazlăul Sărat in Romania
- The Cut (Michigan), a river in the Lower Peninsula of Michigan
