= Cut River (Mackinac County, Michigan) =

River in Michigan, United States

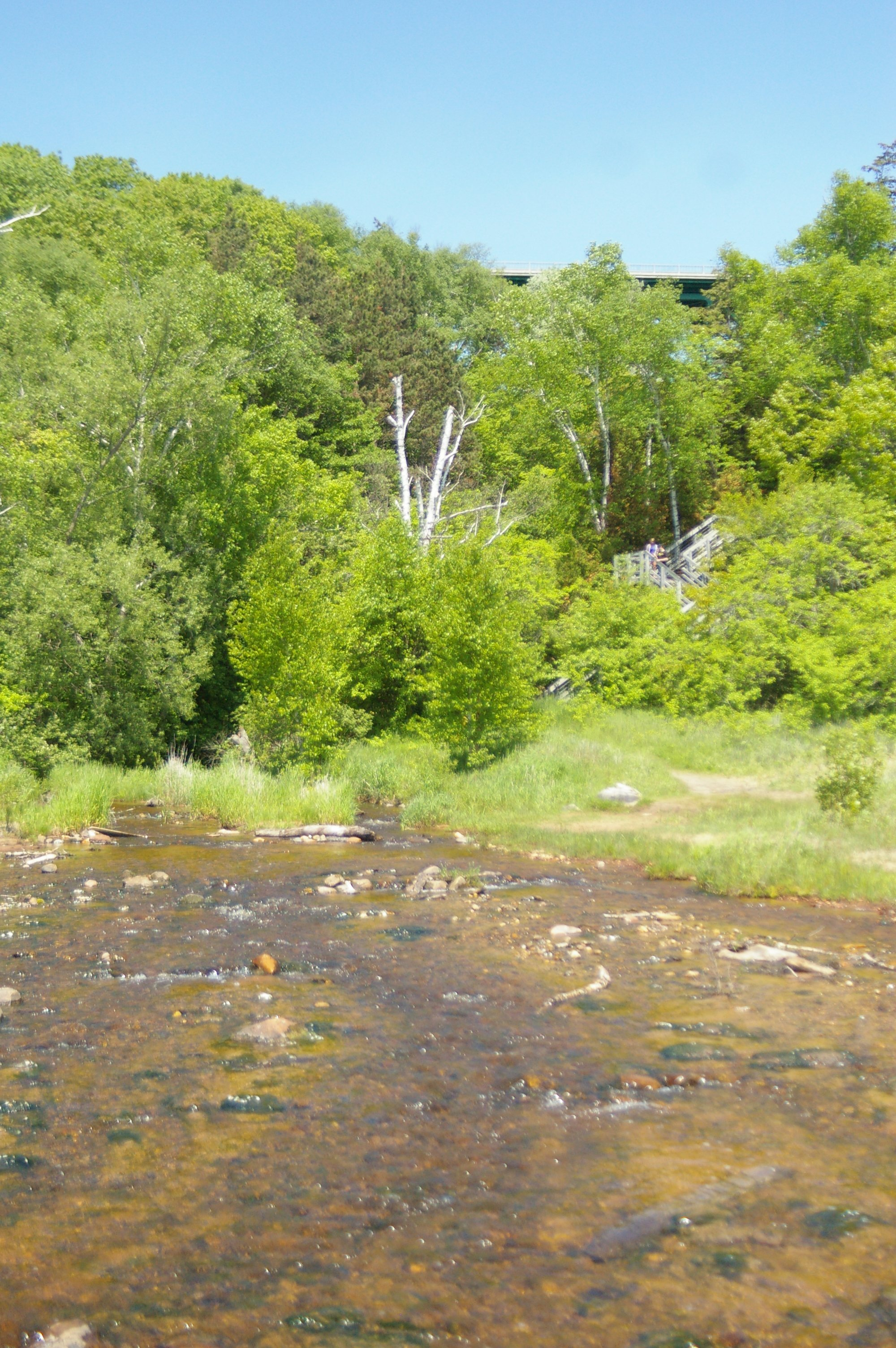
- Cut River

Location
- Country: United States
- State: Michigan
- Region: Upper Peninsula

Physical characteristics
- Source: Mackinac County
  - coordinates: 46.0759°N 85.1201°W
- Mouth: Lake Michigan
  - coordinates: 46.0445°N 85.1267°W
- Length: 4 mi (6.4 km)

Cut River is a small, short river in the Upper Peninsula of the U.S. state of Michigan. The four-mile (6.4 km) river runs along the boundary between Hendricks Township and Moran Township, with the mouth on Lake Michigan about two miles (3.2 km) east of Epoufette and about four miles (6.4 km) west of Brevort.

It drains part of the Little Brevoort wetland through a steep-sided limestone gorge into northern Lake Michigan. The river's drainage is largely located within the Lake Superior State Forest and is administered by the Michigan Department of Natural Resources.

Cut River is notable for two features:

- The Cut River Bridge, carrying U.S. Highway 2 over the Cut River close to its mouth, is one of the longest truss arch bridges in the United States, and it is the eighth longest bridge in Michigan. Completed in 1947, the bridge is 641 feet (195 m) long, and rises 140 feet (43 m) above the base of the gorge. Parking is available at both ends of the bridge, and there is a pedestrian footpath on the north side of the bridge, offering a good view of the gorge. Locals call the bridge "the million dollar bridge over a two-bit creek".
- The Cut River gorge is well adapted to growth of mature sugar maple specimens. The bridge and footpath, which rise just above treetop level, offer good views of the gorge during the autumn color season. Hiking trails descend from both ends of the bridge down into the river valley, with a spur to the Lake Michigan shoreline.

Short video of Cut River
