= Epoufette Island =

Island in Lake Michigan

- Location within Michigan

Geography
- Location: Lake Michigan
- Coordinates: 46.0441725°N 85.2017443°W
- Highest elevation: 587 ft (178.9 m)

Administration
- United States
- State: Michigan
- County: Mackinac County
- Township: Hendricks Township

Epoufette Island (/iːpoʊˈfɛt/ EE-poh-feht) is an island in Lake Michigan. It is located in Hendricks Township, in Mackinac County, Michigan. The island lies about 500 feet (0.15 km) off the Upper Peninsula main land. The community of Epoufette is north of the island.
