= Brevort, Michigan =

- Unincorporated community
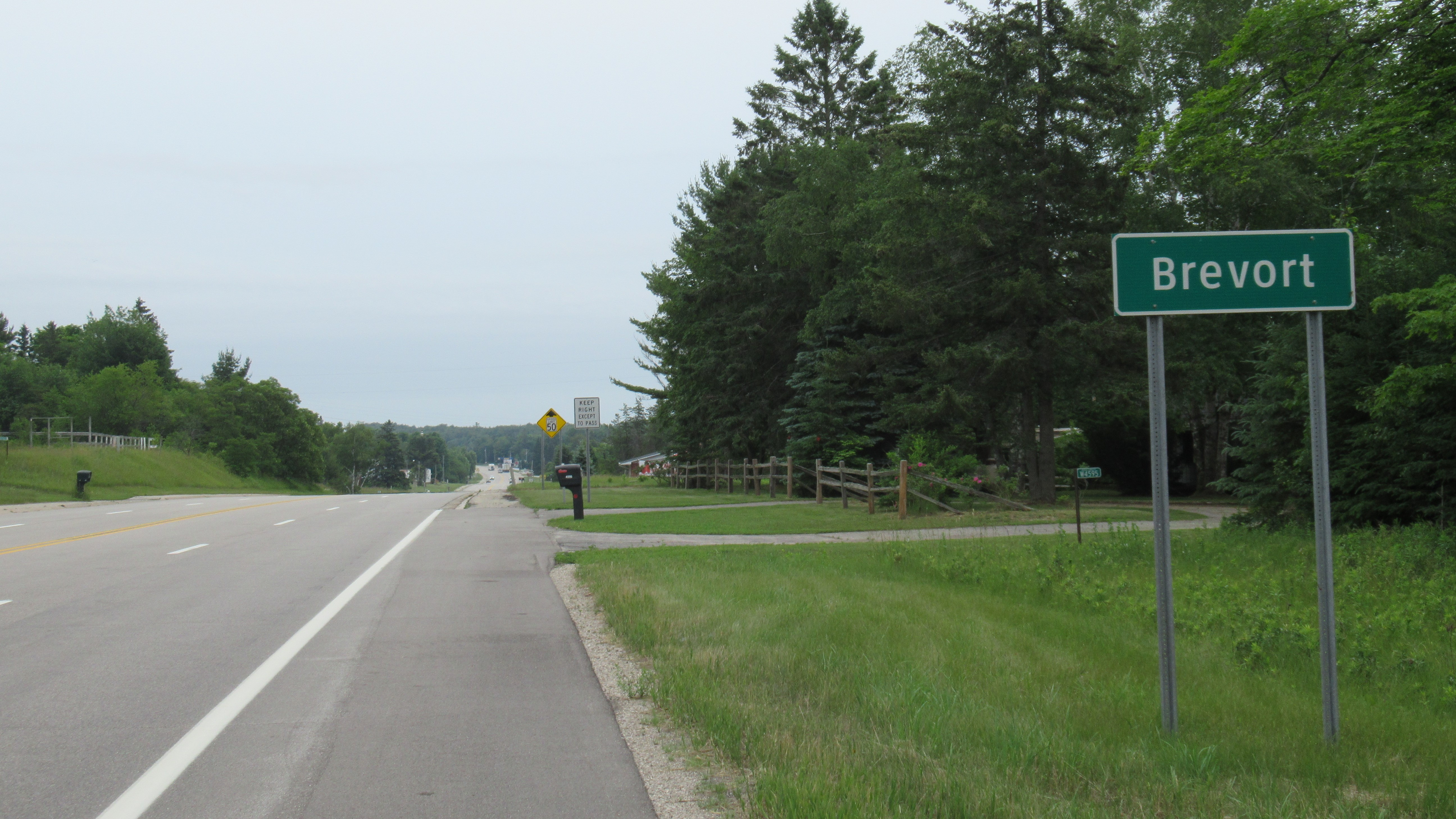
- Brevort signage along U.S. Route 2

- Location within the state of Michigan Location within the United States
- Coordinates: 46°01′08″N 85°02′30″W
- Country: United States
- State: Michigan
- County: Mackinac
- Township: Moran
- Settled: 1867
- Established: 1890
- Elevation: 673 ft (205 m)
- Time zone: UTC-5 (Eastern (EST))
  - Summer (DST): UTC-4 (EDT)
- ZIP code(s): 49760 (Moran)
- Area code: 906
- GNIS feature ID: 621937

Brevort (/brɛˈvɔːrt/ breh-VORT) is an unincorporated community in Mackinac County in the U.S. state of Michigan. The community is located along the northern shores of Lake Michigan along U.S. Route 2 within Moran Township. As an unincorporated community, Brevort has no legally defined boundaries or population statistics of its own.

== History ==
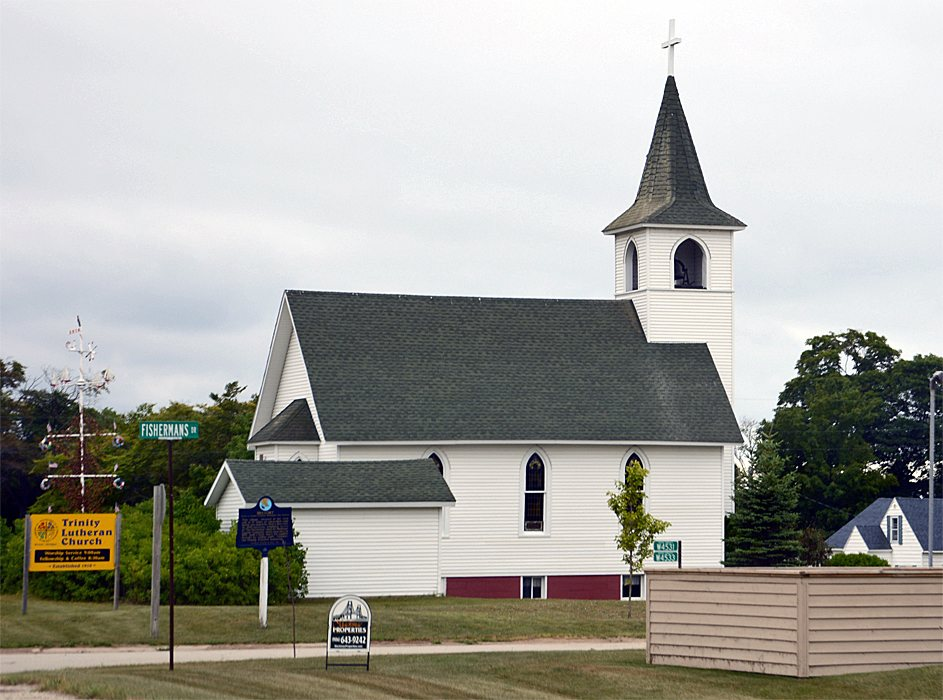
Trinity Lutheran Church and historic marker within Brevort

Brevort was originally named for early explorer Henry Brevort (or Brevoort), who surveyed the area in 1845. Brevort was assigned to subdivide the undeveloped area, and therefore, many features were named after him. In 1867, Charles Gustafson bought three parcels of land in the area, and many Swedish followers moved to the area.

In 1875, the Mackinac Lumber Company built a large storage supply depot in the area for its lumber stock to be shipped along the Great Lakes. Because of the lumber company's presence, the area was known as "the Warehouse" during the 1880s. A community grew around the depot, and Brevort was first settled in 1884 as a fishing village. The community received its first post office on June 25, 1890 with Hattie Vought serving as the first postmaster. By 1893, the population of the community was recorded at 75.

When the railway industry began constructing lines through the Upper Peninsula near the end of the century, Brevort did not have railroad access and continued to rely on shipping for the exportation of its lumber resources. Road access was also limited until the creation of M-12 in 1919. In 1926, M-12 was replaced with early segments of the present-day U.S. Route 2. After the lumbering industry declined, the population of the community also declined, but commercial fishing continued. Road and lake access allowed Brevort to sustain, and the community's population increased to 100 by 1927.

In 1961, Moran Township erected a historic marker near Trinity Lutheran Church to commemorate the historic community of Brevort. The post office in Brevort was discontinued on December 30, 1964. While Brevort no longer contains any industries, the community contains a small population and relies as a tourist destination along U.S. Route 2 between St. Ignace and Naubinway. The Western Cemetery (also known as Brevort Cemetery) is located along U.S. Route 2 just northwest of the community center. The cemetery's oldest grave dates back to 1893, and the cemetery remains active.

== Geography ==
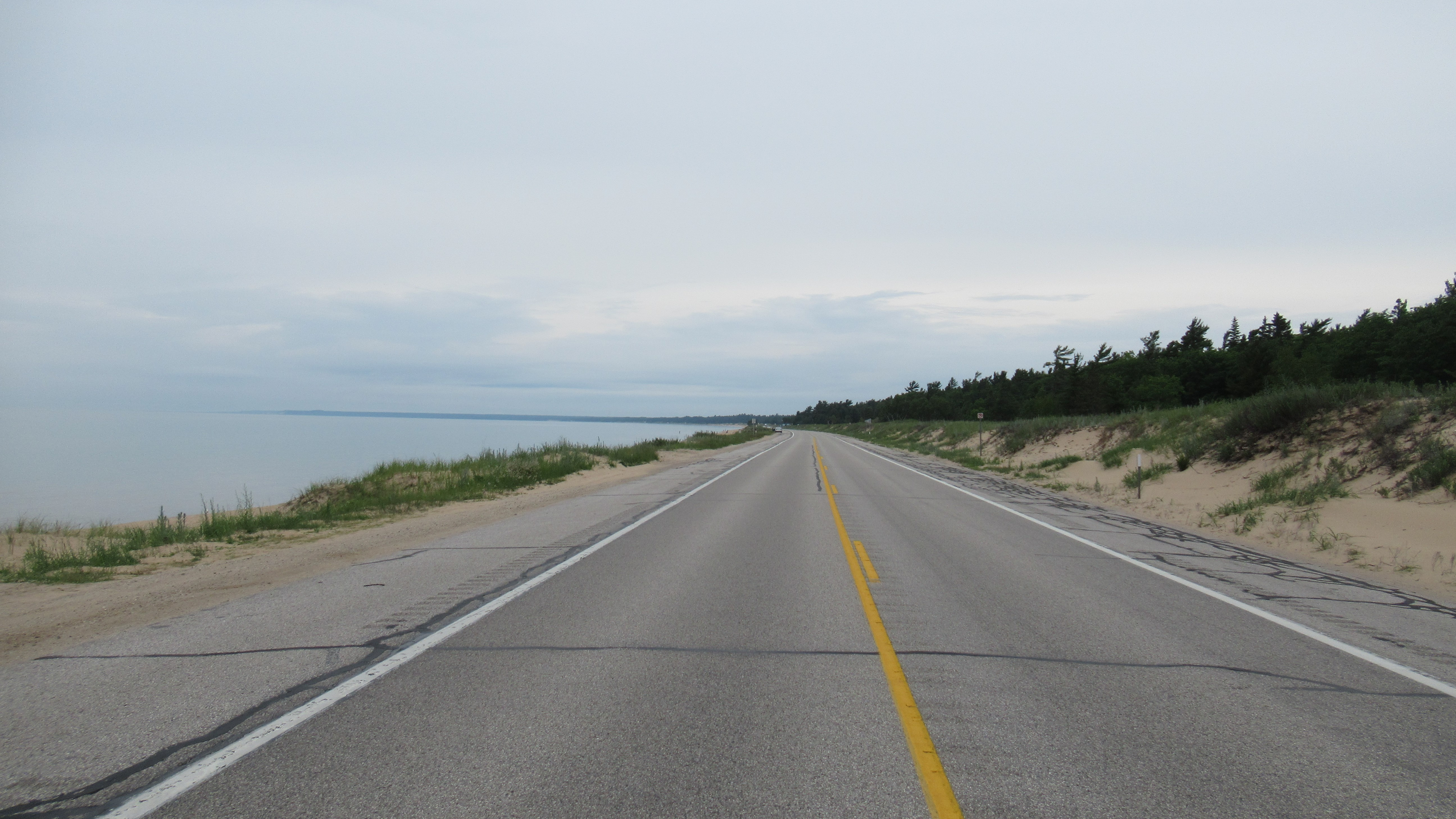
U.S. Route 2 running along Lake Michigan near Brevort

Brevort is located within Moran Township in the state's Upper Peninsula about 15 miles (24.1 km) northwest of the Mackinac Bridge. The Hiawatha National Forest is just to the east of the center of the community. Portions of the surrounding area are also included in the Sault Ste. Marie section of the Lake Superior State Forest. The community sits at an elevation of 597 feet (182 m) above sea level.

The community of Brevort is not actually located in Brevort Township, which is to the east. Also, the community of Moran is not located in Moran Township but is within Brevort Township. The nearest sizable community is the city of St. Ignace about 15 miles (24.1 km) to the southeast. Other smaller communities nearby include Engadine, Epoufette, Garnet, and Naubinway to the northwest, as well as Gros Cap to the southeast and Trout Lake to the north. Brevort no longer contains its own post office and uses the Moran 49760 ZIP Code. The community is served by Moran Township School District, which is conterminous with the township itself.

Along with Lake Michigan, other nearby geographic features include Brevoort River, Little Brevoort Lake, and Brevoort Lake, which are spelled differently than the community and township. Brevort is also notable for containing several miles of scenic lakefront and sand dunes along the shores of Lake Michigan, which run parallel to U.S. Route 2 at this point. These dunes and easy public access are popular tourist destinations along the Lake Michigan Circle Tour.
