= Cut River Bridge =

Heath M. Robinson Memorial Cut River Bridge
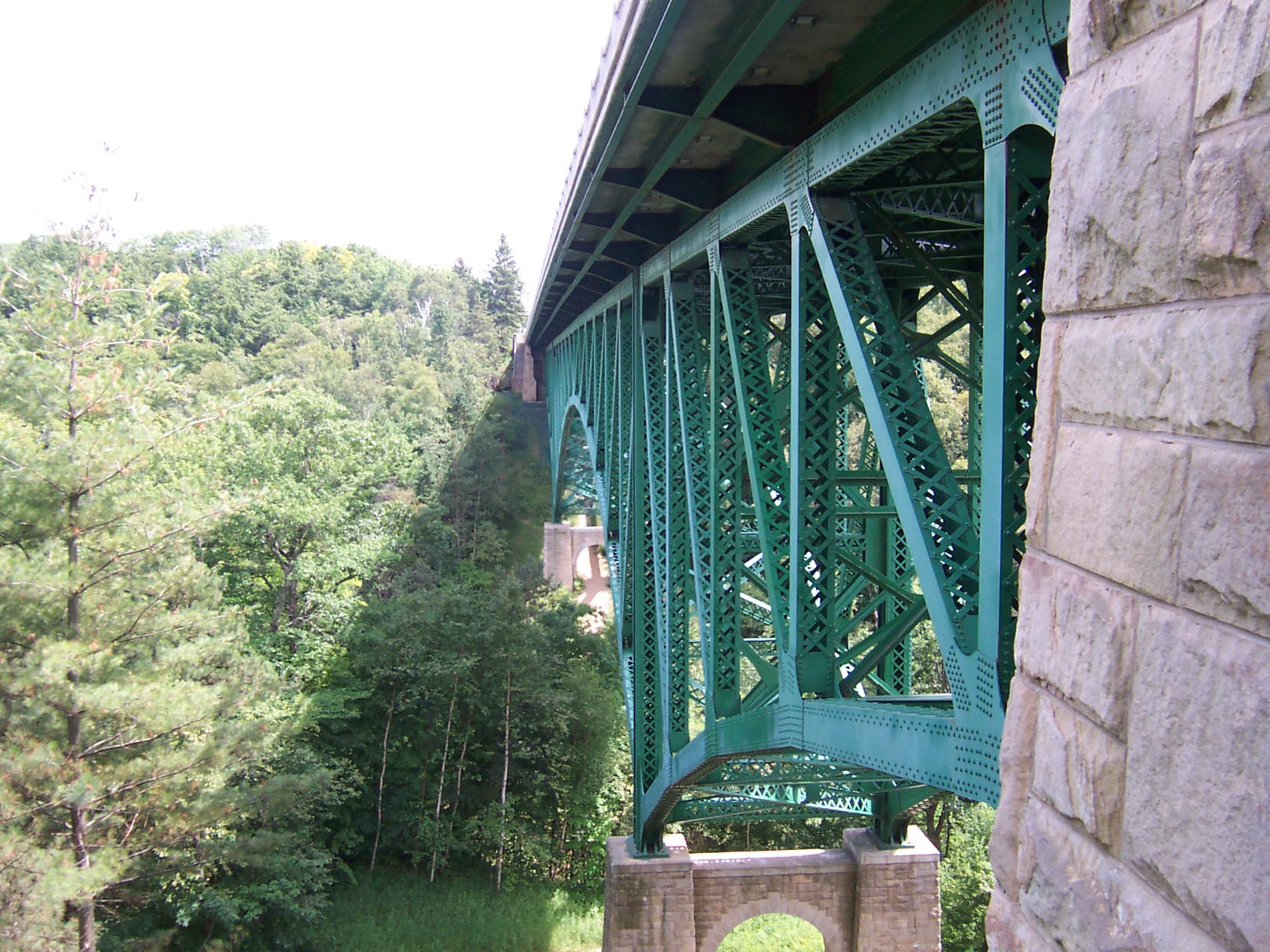
- The Cut River Bridge is a cantilevered steel deck bridge
- Coordinates: 46.044986°N 85.125206°W
- Carries: US 2 Pedestrians, automobiles, trucks
- Crosses: Cut River
- ID number: 49149023000B010

Characteristics
- Design: steel deck cantilever bridge
- Material: Iron, structural steel, prestressed concrete
- Total length: 641 feet (195 m)

History
- Constructed by: W.J. Meagher and Sons, Contractors
- Construction start: 1941
- Construction end: 1947
- Opened: 1947

Cut River Bridge is a cantilevered steel deck bridge over the Cut River in the Upper Peninsula of the U.S. state of Michigan. It is located along U.S. Highway 2 (US 2) in Hendricks Township, Mackinac County, between Epoufette and Brevort, about 25 miles (40 km) northwest of St. Ignace and the Straits of Mackinac. There is a long wooden staircase to the valley below that was constructed some time after the construction of the bridge itself. On the east end of the bridge, there is an office door built under the main structure with a brass plaque inscribed "T. Troll".

The bridge was built in 1947 and is one of only two cantilevered deck truss bridges in Michigan, it is 641 feet (195 m) long and contains 888 short tons (793 long tons; 806 t) of structural steel. The bridge carries traffic on US 2 above and spans the Cut River Valley, 147 feet (45 m) below.

The second cantilevered bridge in Michigan is the Mortimer E. Cooley Bridge on M55 over the Pine River in Manistee County. It is a metal cantilever 12 panel rivet connected Pratt Deck Truss fixed bridge built in 1934 and rehabilitated in 1989. Its structure length is 613 feet, with a span of 300 feet. The Cut River Bridge and the Cooley Bridge are twins in appearance.

== History ==
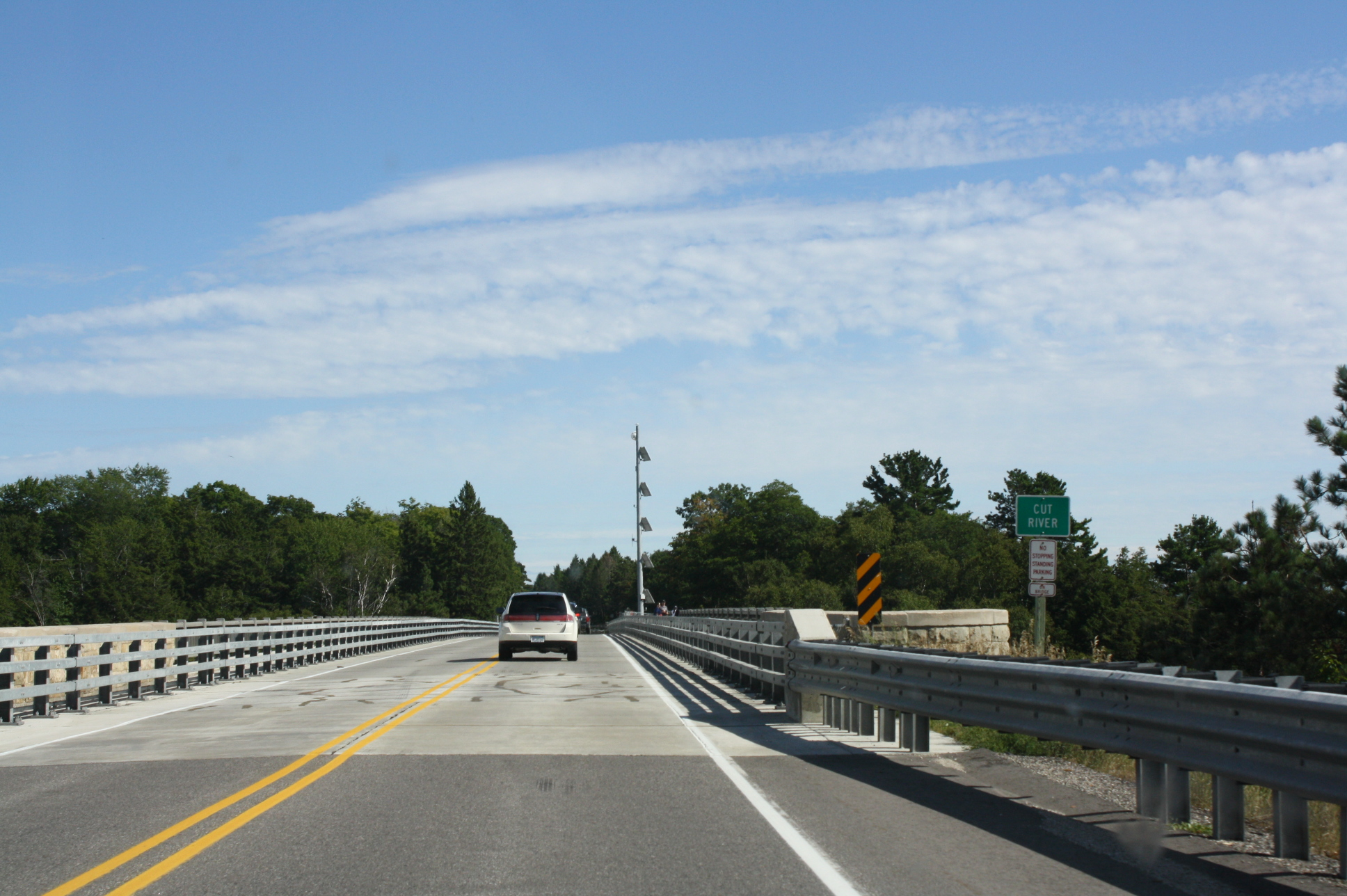
Centerline

The State Highway Department designed this structure, and W.J. Meagher and Sons, Contractors, built it. Actual construction began in 1941. Due to the demand for steel during World War II, construction on the bridge was halted until after the war.

Legislation passed in 2014 by the Michigan Legislature named the bridge after Heath Michael Robinson, a fallen member of the Navy SEALs who was killed on August 6, 2011 in Wardak, Afghanistan when their Chinook helicopter came under fire.

== Construction ==
The bridge is a steel deck cantilever bridge. The structure has extensive latticing on its members, which are all very massive. The bridge retains original standard-plan metal guardrails on the sidewalks that flank the roadway on each side.

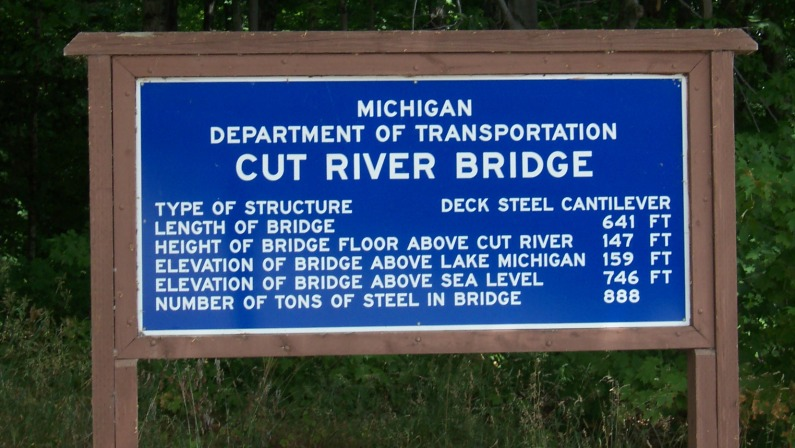
MDOT Sign at Cut River Bridge
