= Epoufette, Michigan =

- Unincorporated community
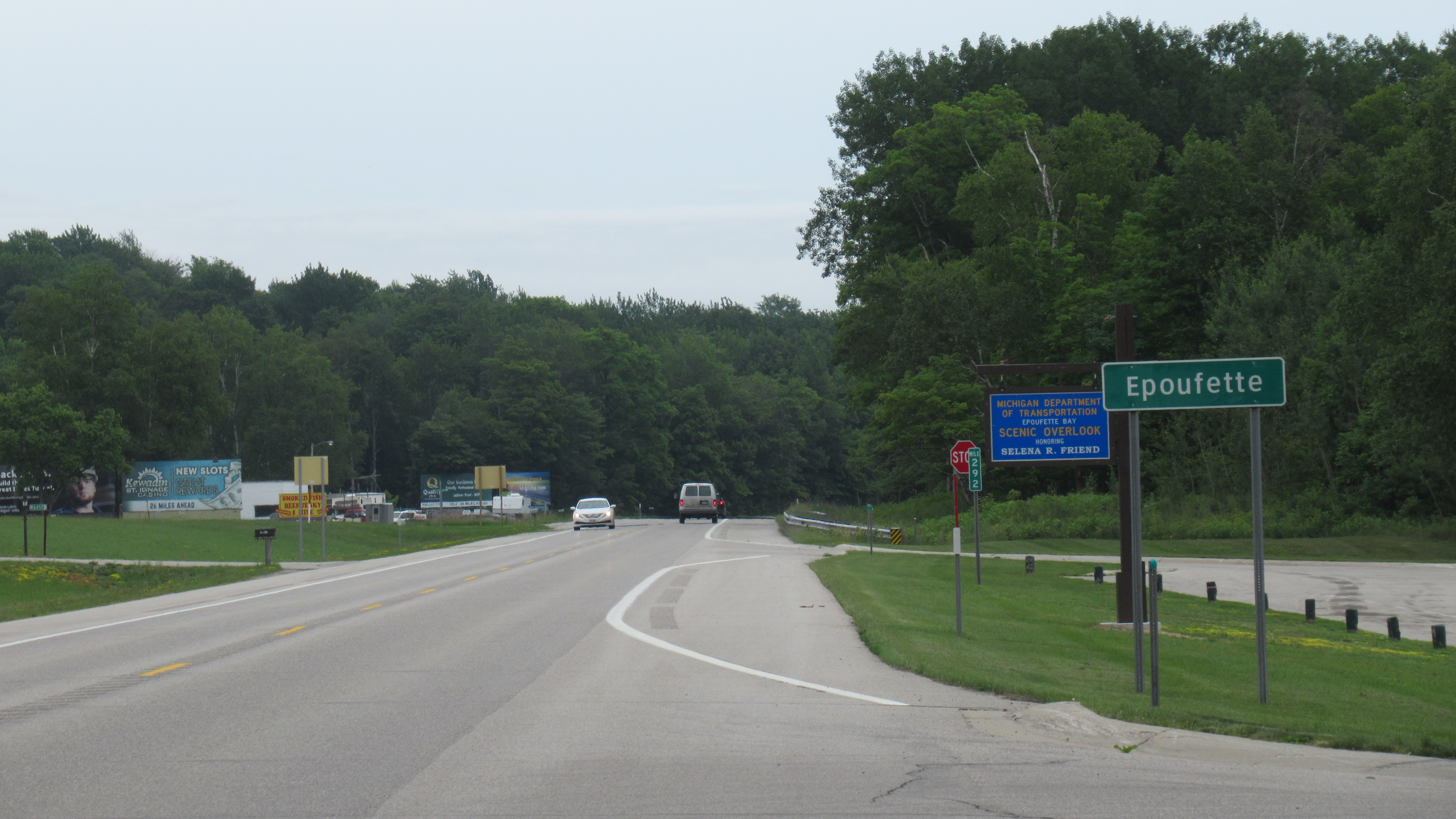
- Signage looking east along U.S. Route 2

- Location within the state of Michigan Location within the United States
- Coordinates: 46°03′20″N 85°10′06″W
- Country: United States
- State: Michigan
- County: Mackinac
- Township: Hendricks
- Settled: 1848
- Established: 1881
- Elevation: 591 ft (180 m)
- Time zone: UTC-5 (Eastern (EST))
  - Summer (DST): UTC-4 (EDT)
- ZIP code(s): 49762 (Naubinway)
- Area code: 906
- GNIS feature ID: 625620

Epoufette Informational Designation
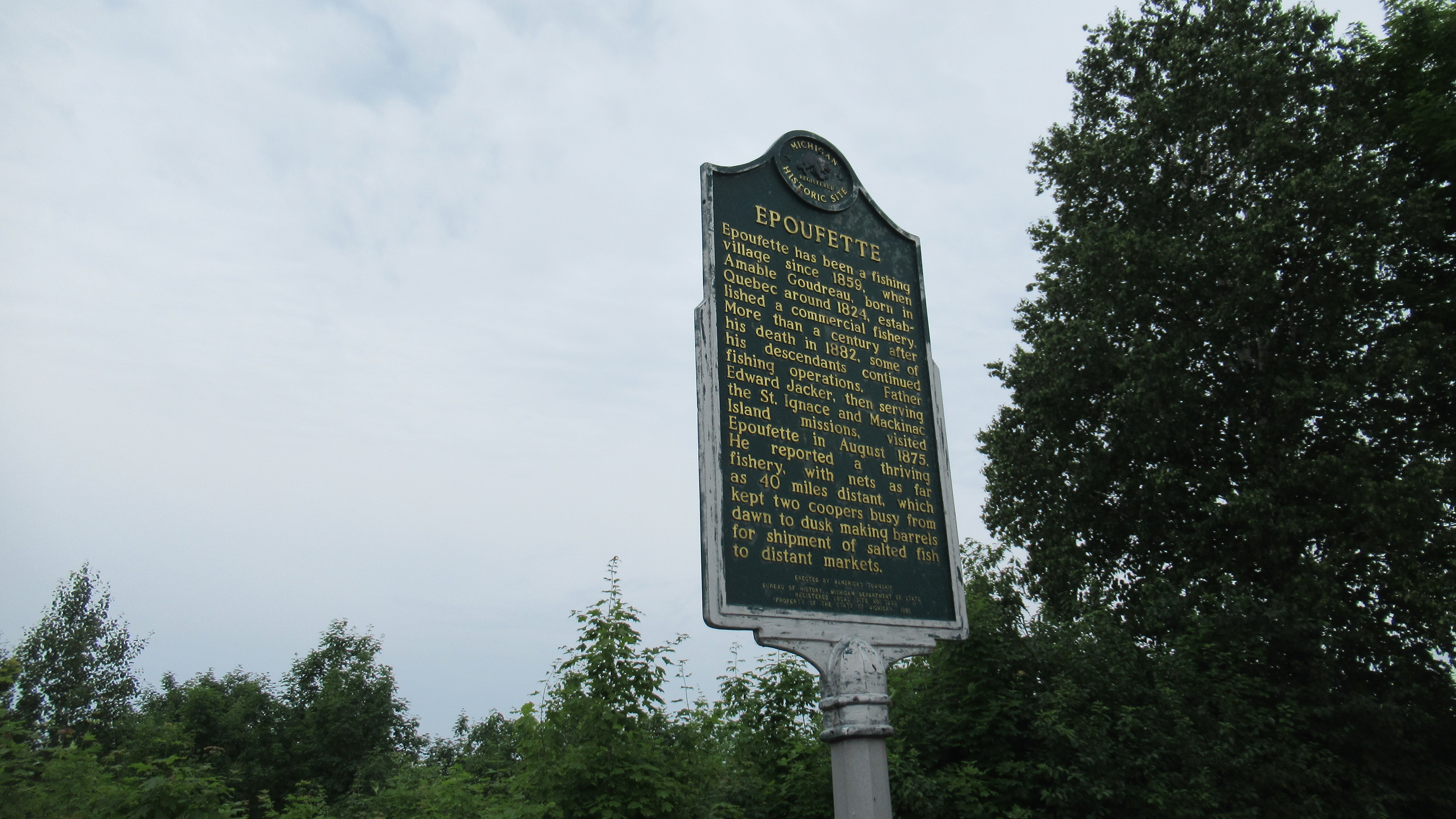
- Interactive map of Epoufette Informational Designation
- 46°03′25″N 85°09′48″W
- Location: Roadside Park, U.S. Route 2 Naubinway, Michigan

Michigan State Historic Site
- Designated: July 23, 1985

Epoufette (/iːpoʊˈfɛt/ EE-poh-feht) is an unincorporated community in Mackinac County in the U.S. state of Michigan. The community is located along the northern shores of Lake Michigan along U.S. Route 2 within Hendricks Township. As an unincorporated community, Epoufette has no legally defined boundaries or population statistics of its own.

== History ==
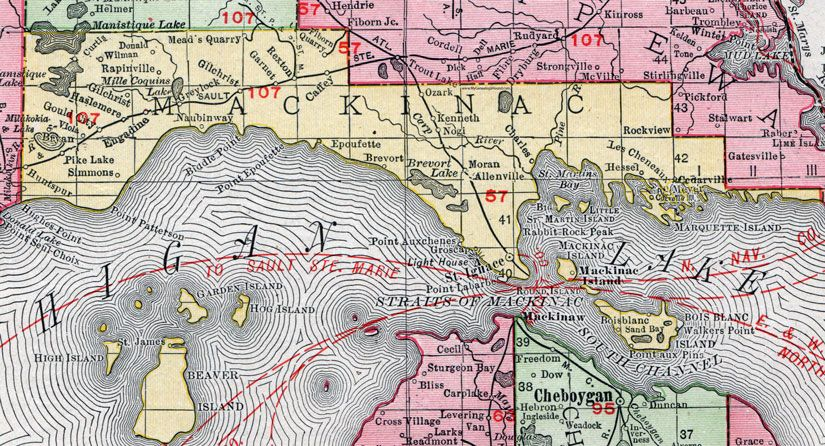
Epoufette listed on a 1911 county map

John R. McLeod was a government surveyor, who founded an Indian village in the area as early as 1848. Early French settlers named the area Epoufette, which translated as "a place of rest." The name is believed to derive from Jacques Marquette when he used the harbor as his first resting place when he embarked from St. Ignace on his trip down Lake Michigan almost 200 years earlier.

The village of Epoufette was later settled in 1859 as a fishing village when Quebec native Amable Goudreau established a commercial fishery. By 1875, the fishing village was thriving and shipping its products across the Great Lakes.

Epoufette received its first post office in 1881 when the lumber industry became established in the area. John R. McLeod served as the first postmaster, and he also worked as a fisherman and farmer. The growing community spread along the shores of Lake Michigan. By 1893, the lumber industry began to decline, and the area's population decreased. The only remaining market was McLeod's general store. When the railroad industry began expanding into the Upper Peninsula by the end of the century, Epoufette was bypassed, and the nearest train depot was 11 miles (17.7 km) north in the community of Rexton.

By 1909, Epoufette transitioned into a mercantile and resort community, although some fishing industries remained. By 1915, the population of the community averaged around 75 residents. L. A. Sweet served as the postmaster and a prominent businessman in the area, and he operated a mill and grocery store. In 1918, Epoufette was designated a "summer resort" when new hotels began operating. Early travel to Epoufette was limited to the Peter White Trail, which ran along the shoreline west from St. Ignace. Epoufette contained a stagecoach stop and regular mail service from St. Ignace. Road access remained limited until the creation of M-12 in 1919. In 1926, M-12 was replaced with early segments of the present-day U.S. Route 2.

Eventually, mail service in Epoufette was transferred to Naubinway, although Epoufette contained its own summer post office from 1959–1972. Epoufette was designated as a Michigan State Historic Site on July 23, 1985. A historic marker was erected along Epoufette Bay in 1986 in what is now a scenic overlook along U.S. Route 2. The Epoufette Cemetery is located within the community along U.S. Route 2 and Paguin Creek Road. The cemetery remains active and has its earliest gravesite dating back to 1887.

== Geography ==
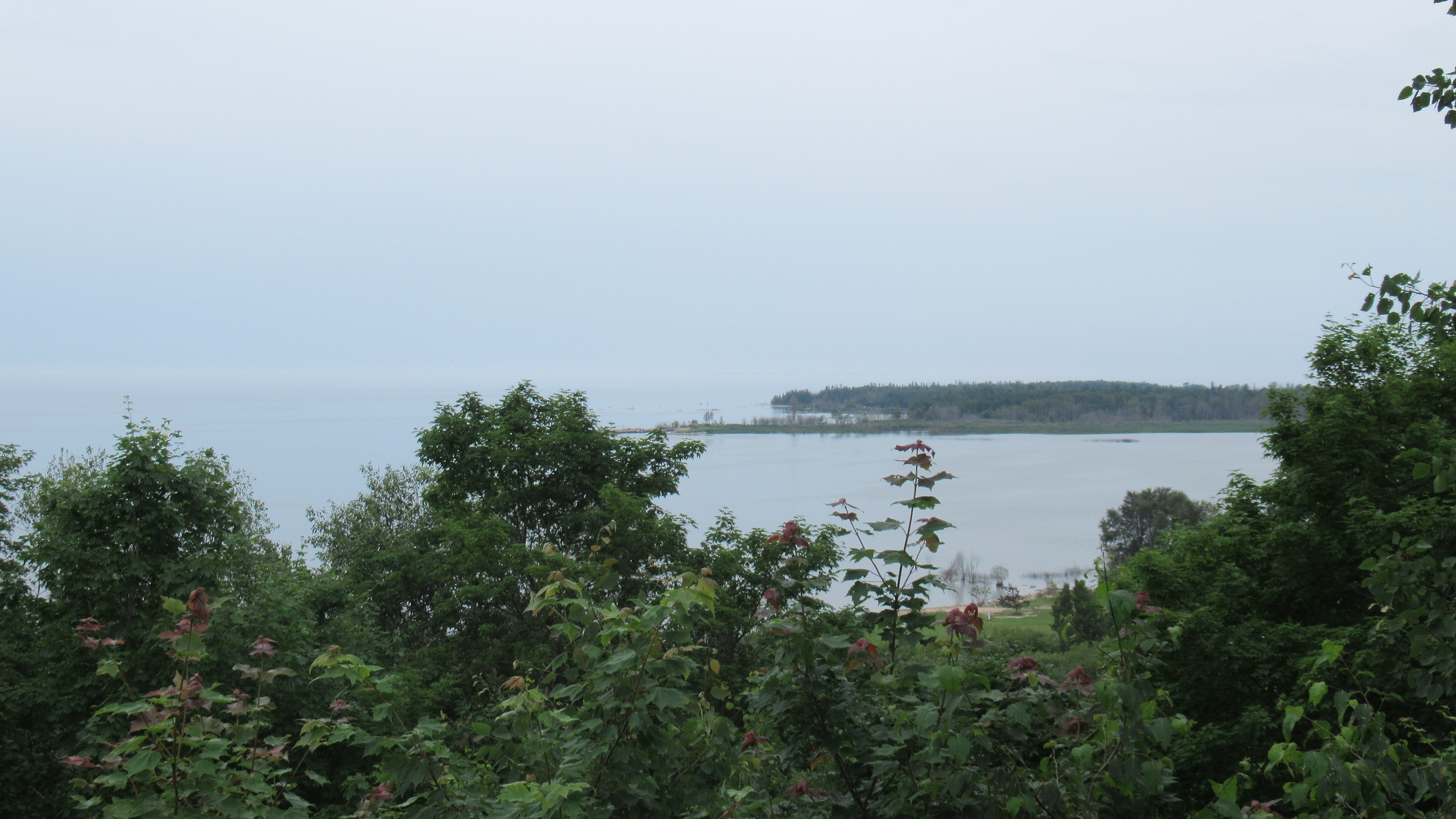
Epoufette Bay

Epoufette is a small community located within Hendricks Township in the state's Upper Peninsula about 30 miles (48.3 km) west of the Mackinac Bridge. Epoufette sits at an elevation of 591 feet (180 m) above sea level.

The community is centered along U.S. Route 2 on the northern shores of Lake Michigan about 27 miles (43.5 km) west of the city of St. Ignace. Other nearby communities include Brevort to the southeast, Trout Lake to the northeast, Garnet to the northwest, and Naubinway and Engadine to the west.

Epoufette no longer contains its own post office and uses the Naubinway 49762 ZIP Code. The community is served by Engadine Consolidated Schools, and Epoufette is at the easternmost edge of the district's boundaries.

The Cut River is located just to the east of the community, and the Cut River Bridge along U.S. Route 2 is listed on the National Register of Historic Places. Epoufette is located along a small natural harbor named Epoufette Bay. The western portion of the bay is a small cape named Point Epoufette that extends a short distance into Lake Michigan. The western side of Point Epoufette is a much smaller bay named Kenyon Bay. Just off the southern coast of the cape is a small uninhabited island named Epoufette Island.
