= Garnet, Michigan =

- Unincorporated community
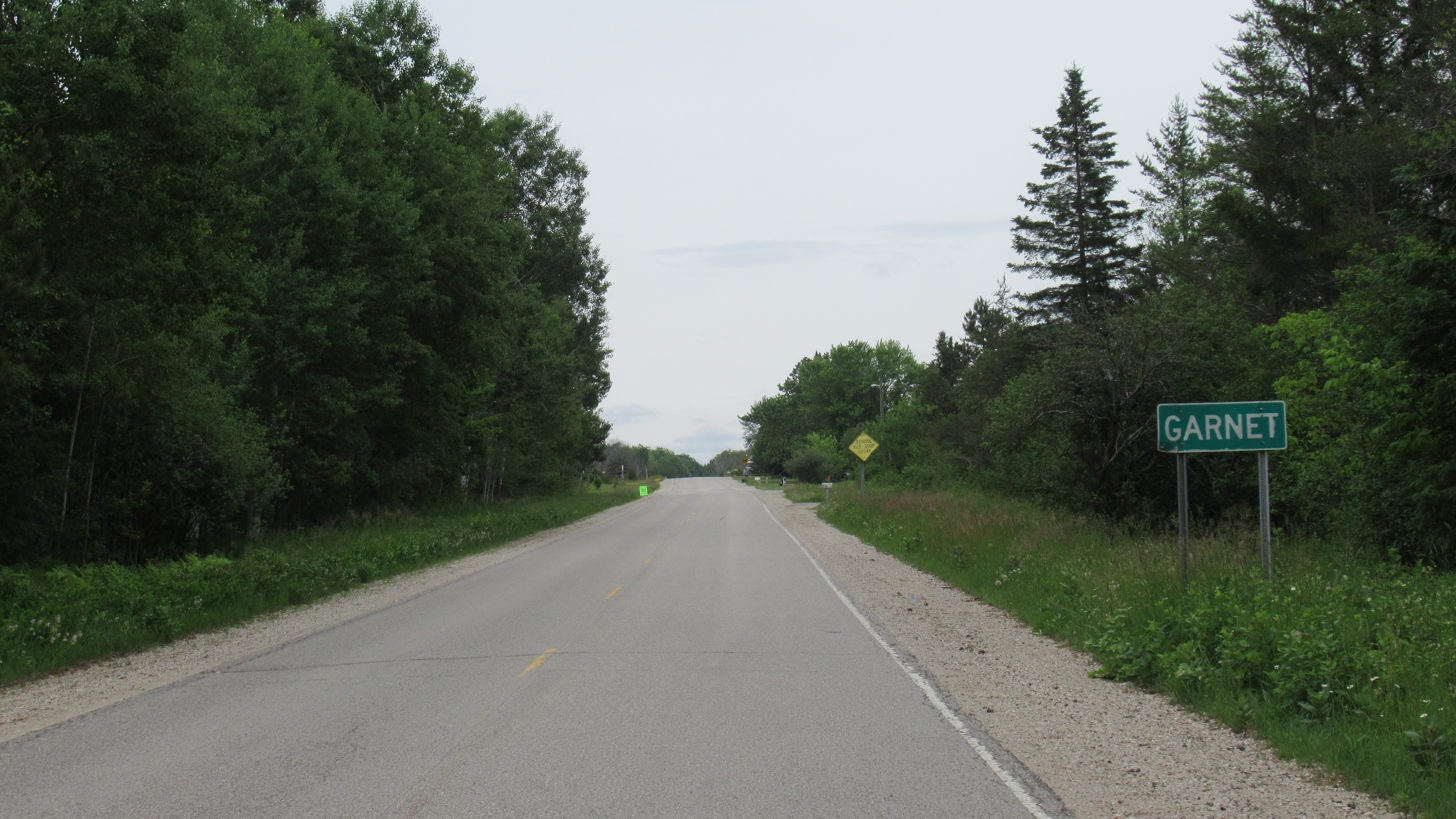
- Signage looking east along Hiawatha Trail

- Location within the state of Michigan Location within the United States
- Coordinates: 46°09′30″N 85°18′24″W
- Country: United States
- State: Michigan
- County: Mackinac
- Township: Hudson
- Settled: 1891
- Elevation: 840 ft (260 m)
- Time zone: UTC-5 (Eastern (EST))
  - Summer (DST): UTC-4 (EDT)
- ZIP code(s): 49762 (Naubinway)
- Area code: 906
- GNIS feature ID: 626672

Garnet (/ɡɑːrˈnɪt/ gar-NIT) is an unincorporated community in Mackinac County in the U.S. state of Michigan. The community is located within Hudson Township. As an unincorporated community, Garnet has no legally defined boundaries or population statistics of its own.

== History ==
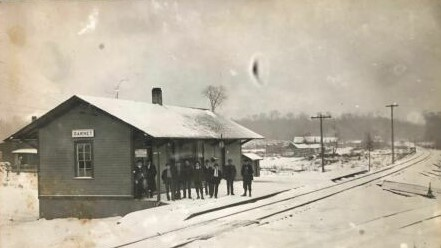
Former rail depot in Garnet

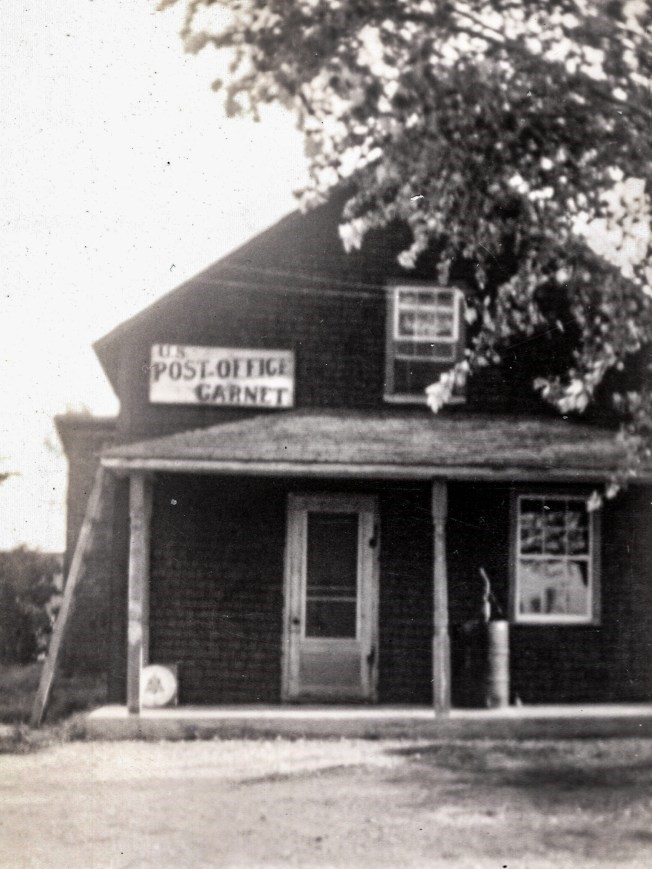
Historic photo of the former post office

A railway line was constructed through the area as early as 1888, and the area soon received a railway depot. The Minneapolis, St. Paul and Sault Ste. Marie Railroad opened a railway stop under the name "Welch" in 1891. The community began to grow and included a sawmill and general store. A post office was opened on November 4, 1898. George Donaldson, who owned the general store, served as the community's first postmaster. By 1900, the population of Welch was around 500. The name of the post office was changed to Garnet on December 31, 1904. The community grew around the sawmill and also became a dairy producing area, as well as including its own school, hotel, saloon, and other businesses. In 1906, the Hudson Lumber Company began operating a steam-powered sawmill and electric plant near the railway in order to harvest the area's vast supply of hemlock trees.

The population began steadily declining, and the community had about 150 residents by 1915. Aside from the railway line and creation of M-48 and M-84, travel to Garnet was difficult and hindered the community's growth. When U.S. Route 2 was constructed and rerouted through the area in the 1930s, it was built further south to provide a more scenic route and bypassed Garnet. In the early 1940s, M-48 was also decommissioned through the area. With a lack of highways and amenities, Garnet never benefited from the tourism boom that followed World War II. In the 1970s, the sawmill closed down. The post office operated until February 4, 1972 when it became a community post office branch; it was finally discontinued on January 13, 1978.

The community of Garnet no longer contains any businesses and is scattered with some remaining abandoned structures. The railway line remains active and is operated by Canadian National Railway but no longer contains a stop or railway station within Garnet. There is still a small population of residents living in Garnet, but by some accounts, it can be considered a ghost town.

== Geography ==
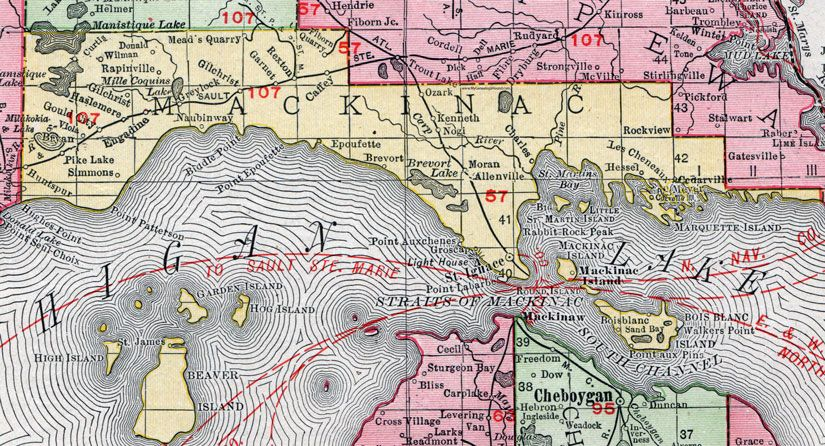
Garnet appearing on a 1911 county map

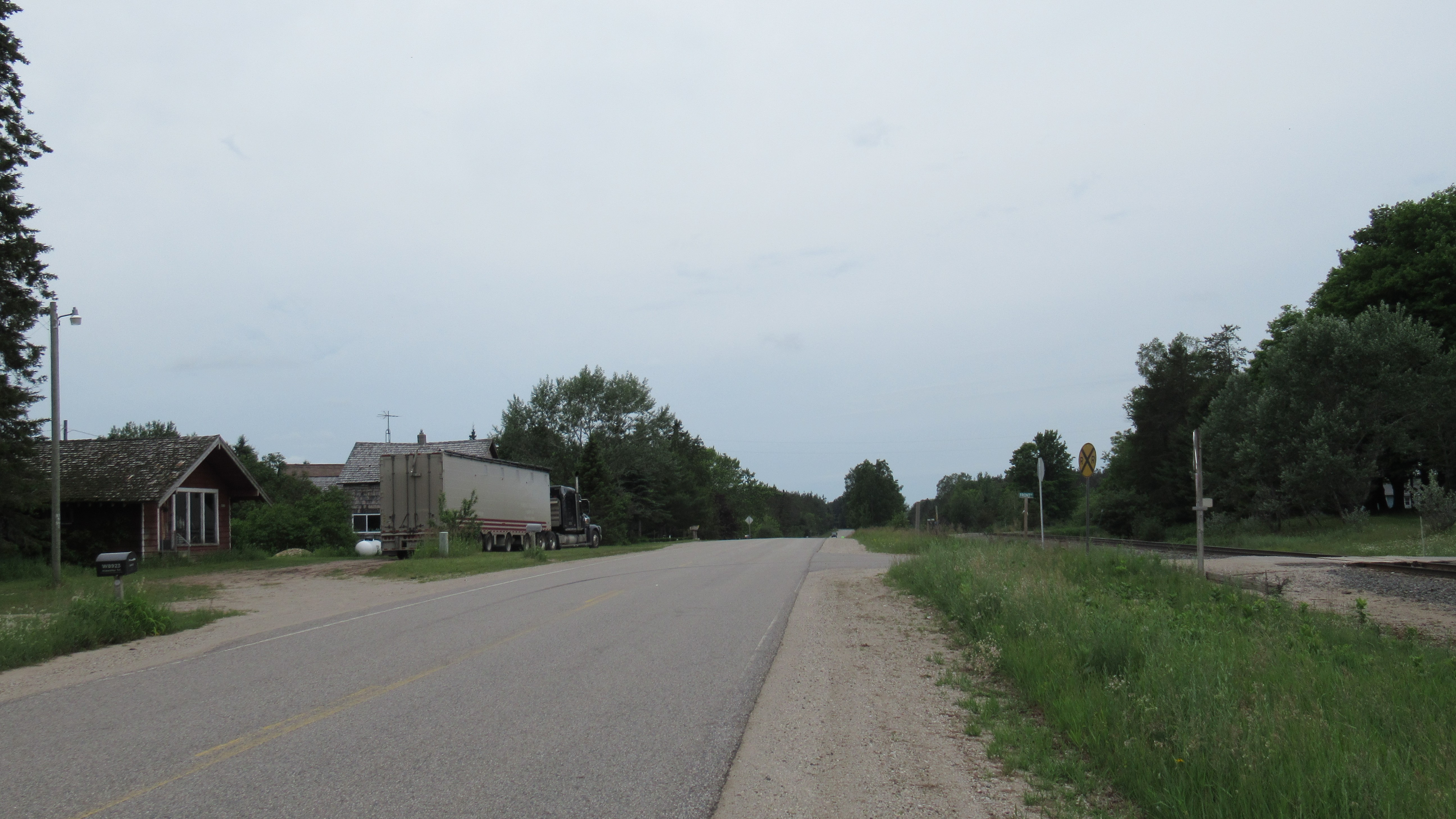
Looking west along Hiawatha Trail (H-40)

Garnet is centrally located within Hudson Township in Mackinac County in the state's Upper Peninsula. The community is located along Hiawatha Trail (County Highway 40) just east of Borgstrom Street in a very rural area surrounded by forests belonging to the Lake Superior State Forest. The Hiawatha National Forest is just to the east of the community. Garnet sits at an elevation of 840 feet (260 m) above sea level.

U.S. Route 2 runs along the northern shores of Lake Michigan about 5.5 miles (8.9 km) to the south. M-28 is about 12 miles (19.3 km) to the north. The nearest sizable community is the village of Newberry about 20 miles (32.2 km) to the northwest, and the city of St. Ignace is about 45 miles (72.4 km) to the southeast. Other smaller communities nearby include Naubinway to the southwest, Epoufette to the southeast, and Millecoquins and Engadine to the west. The community of Rexton is just east along Hiawatha Trail and is the only other community within the sparely-populated Hudson Township.

Garnet and the surrounding area is served by Engadine Consolidated Schools. Garnet does not contain its own post office and utilizes the Naubinway 49762 ZIP Code.

Garnet Lake is located within the community. The lake encompasses 32.1 acres (13.0 ha) and also includes the Garnet Lake State Forest Campground. The rustic lakefront campground was formerly operated by the Michigan Department of Natural Resources but is now operating under the administration of the township.
