= Hudson Township, Mackinac County, Michigan =

Hudson Township, Michigan
- Civil township
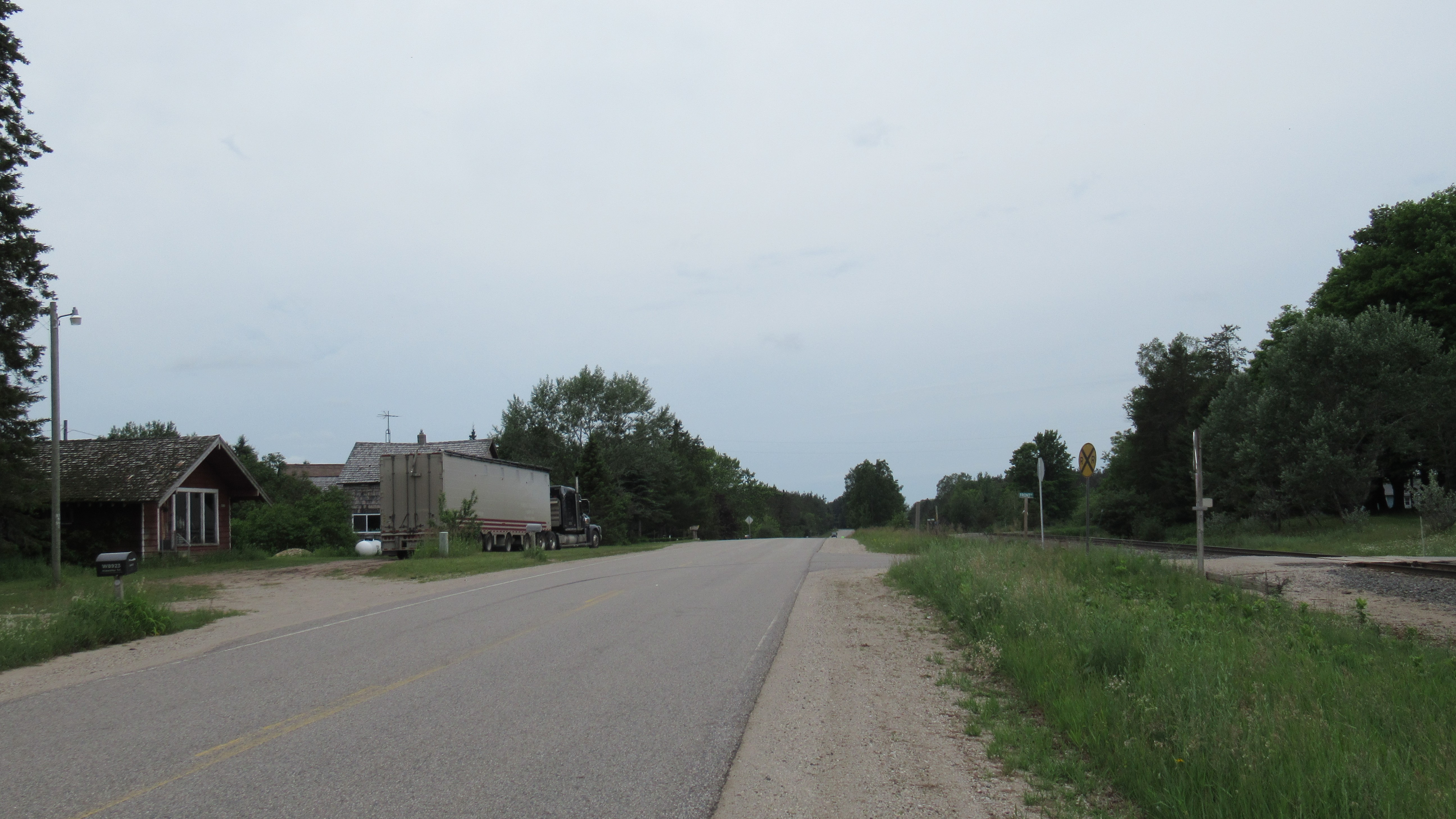
- Community of Garnet along Hiawatha Trail

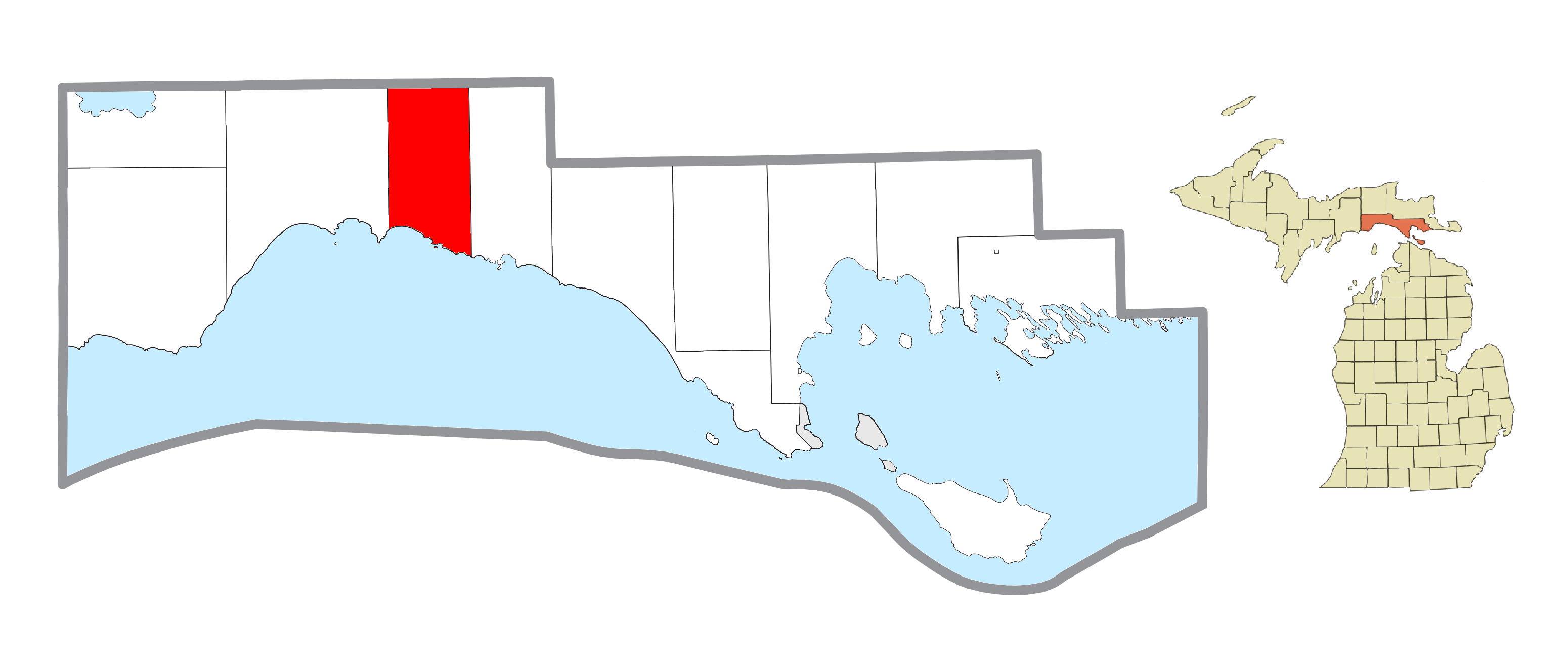
- Location within Mackinac County

- Location within the state of Michigan Location within the United States
- Coordinates: 46°08′32″N 85°17′34″W
- Country: United States
- State: Michigan
- County: Mackinac

Government
  - Supervisor: John Kostiuk
  - Clerk: Barbara Kerridge

Area
  - Total: 69.42 sq mi (179.8 km^{2})
  - Land: 68.77 sq mi (178.1 km^{2})
  - Water: 0.65 sq mi (1.7 km^{2})
- Elevation: 840 ft (256 m)

Population (2020)
  - Total: 193
  - Density: 2.63/sq mi (1.02/km^{2})
- Time zone: UTC-5 (Eastern (EST))
  - Summer (DST): UTC-4 (EDT)
- ZIP Code: 49762 (Naubinway)
- Area code: 906
- FIPS code: 26-097-39760
- GNIS feature ID: 1626500

Hudson Township is a civil township of Mackinac County in the U.S. state of Michigan. As of the 2020 census, its population was 193.

== Geography ==
The township is in western Mackinac County on the northern shore of Lake Michigan. It is bordered to the east by Hendricks Township and to the west by Garfield Township, both in Mackinac County; to the north by Pentland Township in Luce County; and at its northeast corner by Hulbert Township in Chippewa County.

According to the United States Census Bureau, Hudson Township has a total area of 69.42 square miles (179.80 km^{2}), of which 68.77 square miles (178.11 km^{2}) are land and 0.65 square miles (1.68 km^{2}) (1.07%) are water.

=== Highways ===
- US 2 runs east–west along the southern edge of the township along the Lake Michigan coastline.
- H-40, known locally as Hiawatha Trail, runs east–west through the center of the township.

=== Attractions ===
- Garlyn Zoo is located within Hudson Township along U.S. Route 2.
- Garnet Lake State Forest Campground
- Hog Island Point State Forest Campground

=== Communities ===
- Garnet is an unincorporated community in the township at 46°09′30″N 85°18′24″W. This was a stop on the Minneapolis, St. Paul and Sault Ste. Marie Railway named Welch in 1891. A settlement had developed around a sawmill and general store. A post office opened with the name Welch on November 4, 1898. The name was changed to Garnet on December 31, 1904, and was discontinued on February 4, 1972. It was a rural branch/CPO until January 13, 1978.
- Rexton is an unincorporated community in the township at 46°09′31″N 85°14′24″W. It was the headquarters for the D. N. McLeod Lumber Company. Canadian bankers financed building the railroad through here, and the settlement is said to have been named in honor of the king of England. A post office opened April 16, 1901 and was discontinued September 1, 1961. It became a station/branch until June 30, 1968.
