= Brevoort River =

River in Michigan, United States

Location
- Country: United States

Physical characteristics
- Source
  - location: Michigan
- Mouth
  - location: 45°57′21″N 84°56′12″W

The Brevoort River (/ˌbrɛˈvɔːrt/ breh-VORT) is a 9.8-mile-long (15.8 km) river on the Upper Peninsula of Michigan in the United States. It begins at the outlet of Brevoort Lake and flows in a highly winding course ultimately southwards to Lake Michigan.

== See also ==
- List of rivers of Michigan
