= Brevoort Lake =

Lake in the state of Michigan, United States

- Location within Michigan Location within the United States
- Location: Mackinac County, Michigan
- Coordinates: 45°59′53″N 84°55′30″W
- Type: Lake
- Primary outflows: Brevoort River
- Basin countries: United States
- Surface area: 4,233 acres (1,713 ha)
- Surface elevation: 623 ft (190 m)

Brevoort Lake (/ˌbrɛˈvɔːrt/ breh-VORT) is a 4,233-acre (1,713 ha) lake in Mackinac County in the U.S. state of Michigan. Much of the lake's sandy shoreline is owned by the National Forest Service as part of Hiawatha National Forest. In summer months, the National Forest operates Brevoort Lake Campground and the adjacent Brevoort Lake Recreation Area, a beach with boat-launch facilities, on and adjacent to a narrow, sandy peninsula that separates most of the lake from Boedne Bay. A fee is charged for use of the campground.

Game fish species occurring in the lake include walleye, northern pike, smallmouth bass, yellow perch, crappies, muskellunge, and sunfish.

The lake's surveyed elevation is 623 feet (190 m) above sea level. It drains via the Brevoort River into Lake Michigan.
