= Hendricks Township, Michigan =

- Civil township
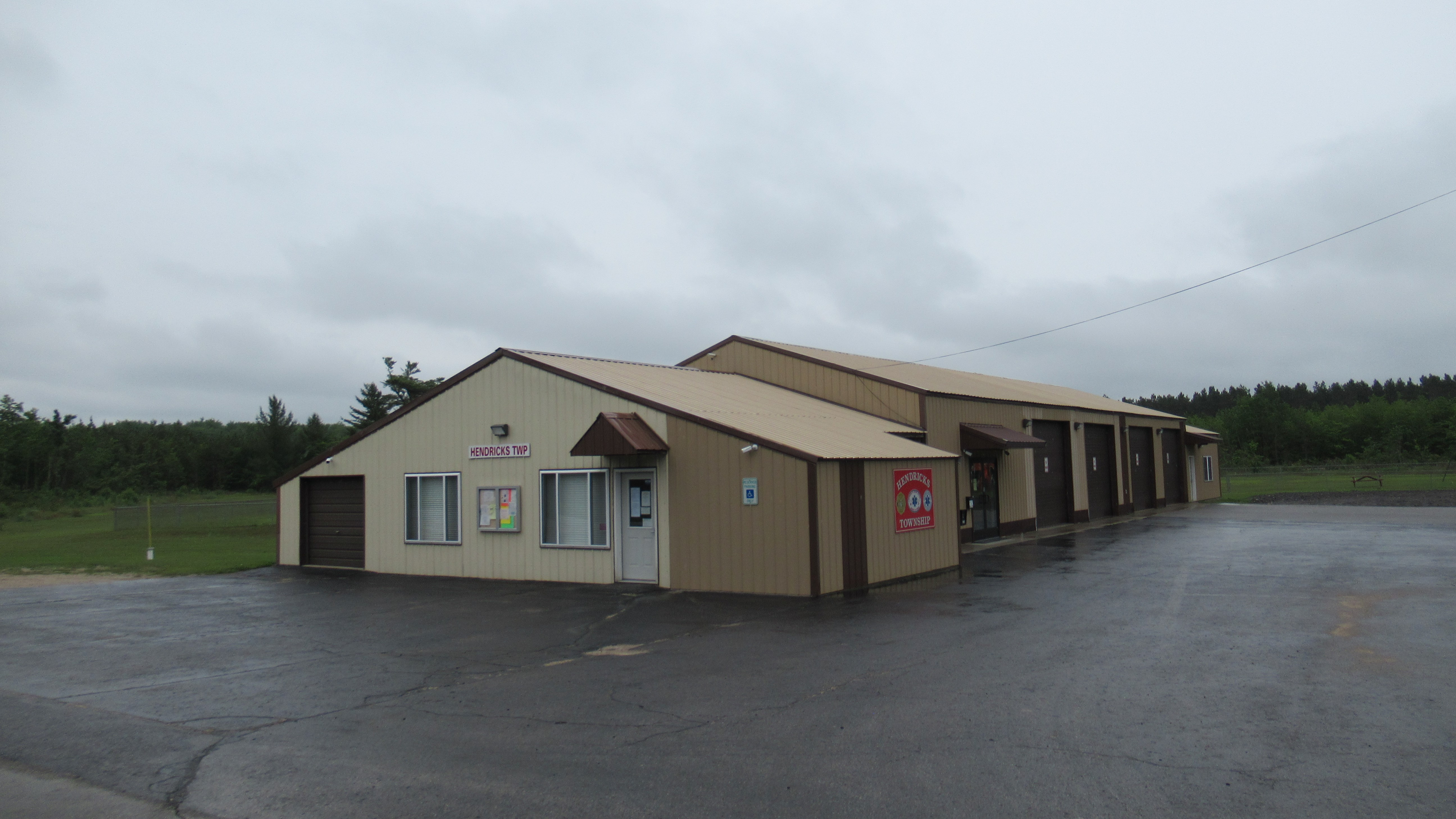
- Hendricks Township Office

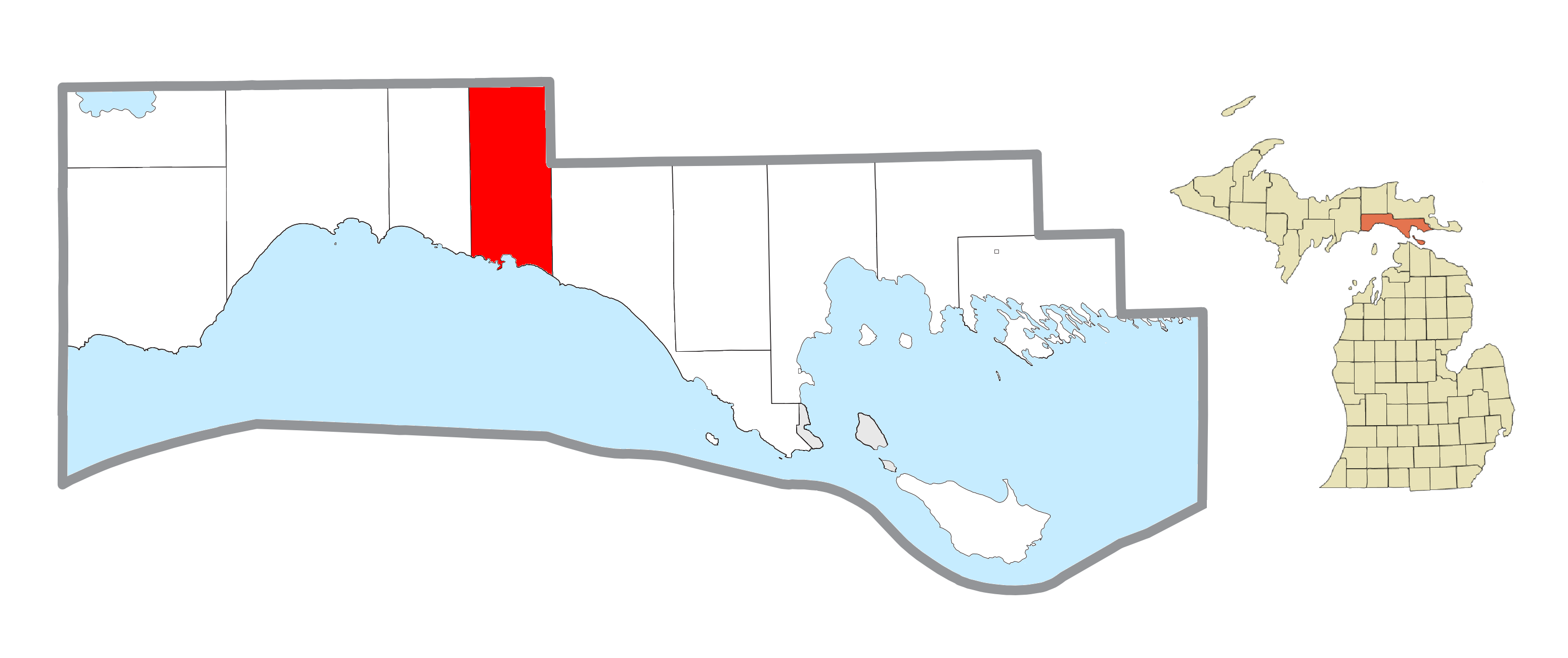
- Location within Mackinac County

- Location within the state of Michigan Location within the United States
- Coordinates: 46°08′26″N 85°10′49″W
- Country: United States
- State: Michigan
- County: Mackinac

Government
  - Supervisor: Howard Hood
  - Clerk: Laurie Collier

Area
  - Total: 81.10 sq mi (210.05 km^{2})
  - Land: 78.97 sq mi (204.53 km^{2})
  - Water: 2.13 sq mi (5.52 km^{2})
- Elevation: 860 ft (262 m)

Population (2020)
  - Total: 117
  - Density: 1.94/sq mi (0.75/km^{2})
- Time zone: UTC-5 (Eastern (EST))
  - Summer (DST): UTC-4 (EDT)
- ZIP Codes: 49762 (Naubinway); 49793 (Trout Lake)
- Area code: 906
- FIPS code: 26-37660
- GNIS feature ID: 1626464

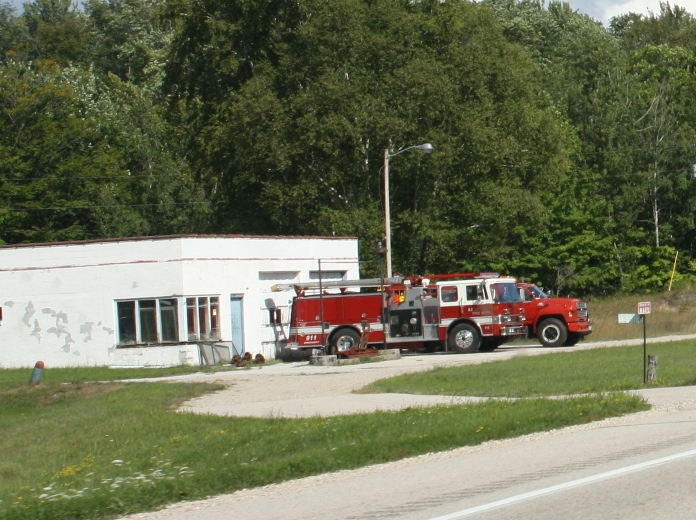
Former Hendricks Township Fire Station

Hendricks Township is a civil township of Mackinac County in the U.S. state of Michigan. The population was 117 at the 2020 census, down from 153 in 2010.

== Geography ==
The township is west of the center of Mackinac County, on the northern shore of Lake Michigan. It is bordered to the east by Moran Township and to the west by Hudson Township, both in Mackinac County; and by Hulbert Township to the north and Trout Lake Township to the northeast, both in Chippewa County.

According to the United States Census Bureau, Hendricks Township has a total area of 81.10 square miles (210.05 km^{2}), of which 78.97 square miles (204.53 km^{2}) are land and 2.13 square miles (5.52 km^{2}) (2.62%) are water.

=== Communities ===
- Caffey, along with the nearby Caffey Corner, was a lumber settlement at 46°10′08″N 85°11′07″W. It is on H-40. West of Caffey, H-40 is also known as the "Hiawatha Trail". At Caffey Corner, the Hiawatha Trail branches off to the south to end at US 2 east of Epoufette. H-40 continues east from Caffey approximately 7 miles (11 km) to Trout Lake and from there on to Rudyard just west of I-75. Its station on the Minneapolis, St. Paul and Sault Ste. Marie Railway was originally called "Lewis", but because at the time there was another post office named Lewis in Michigan, it was given a post office named "Caffey", after the Pennsylvania-born Civil War veteran William N. Caffey, who became the first postmaster in November 1899. The office closed in September 1909 and re-opened with Caffey as postmaster in June 1913. The post office closed permanently in December 1916.
- Epoufette is an unincorporated community in the township on US 2 on Lake Michigan at 46°03′20″N 85°10′06″W. In 1848, a government surveyor, John R. McLeod, found an Ojibwe village here. Amable Goudreau began a commercial fishing business here in 1859, but it did not get a post office until lumbering operations began. McLeod became the first postmaster in December 1879. The name, French for "place of rest", was given by early French settlers because it was believed that Father Jacques Marquette used the harbor as the first step on his trip down Lake Michigan from St. Ignace. A historical marker commemorating the fishing village was erected in 1986. A summer post office operated here from 1959 to 1965 and 1966–1972.
- Fiborn Quarry was a settlement around a limestone quarry.
