= Lake Superior State Forest =

State forest in Michigan, United States

- Map showing state forests in Michigan

- Location within Michigan Location within the United States
- Location: Upper Peninsula, Michigan
- Coordinates: 46.32°N 85.23°W
- Governing body: Michigan Department of Natural Resources

Lake Superior State Forest is a state forest in the Upper Peninsula of Michigan, United States. It is operated by the Michigan Department of Natural Resources. The North Country Trail utilizes this state forest for 43 miles (69 km) of its route.

The Lake Superior forest region was one of the last areas in Michigan to be logged for old-growth Red Pine and White Pine. Logging continued into the 1910s. Much of the sandy, cut-over land was seen as worthless and was allowed to revert to the state of Michigan in lieu of unpaid property taxes. The state reorganized these parcels of property as the Lake Superior State Forest.

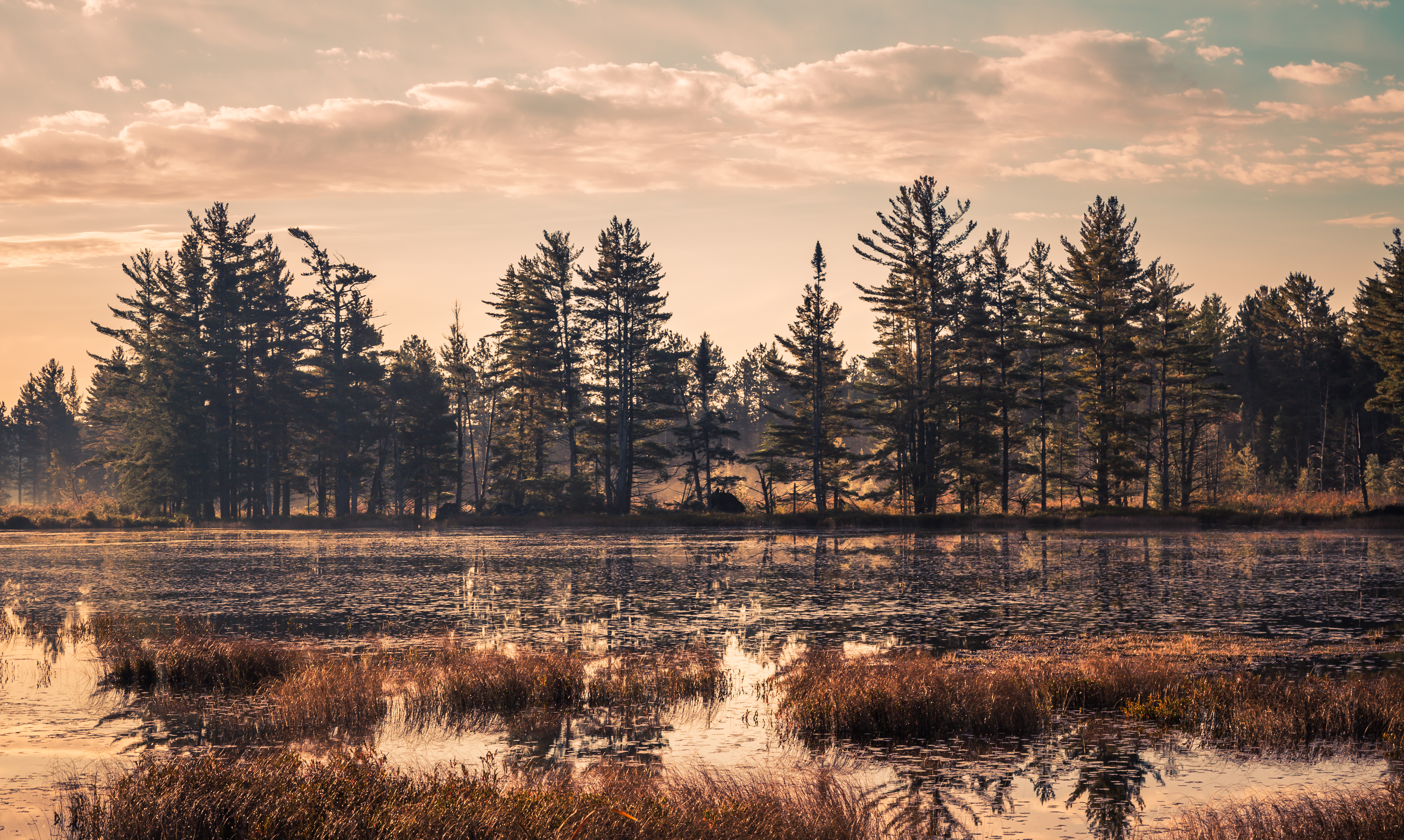
Bog in the Newberry State Forest Area
