= Millecoquins River =

Millecoquins River may refer to a river in Michigan in the United States:

- Lower Millecoquins River
- Upper Millecoquins River
