= Hiawatha Sportsman's Club 1931 Maintenance Building and Commissary =

- U.S. National Register of Historic Places
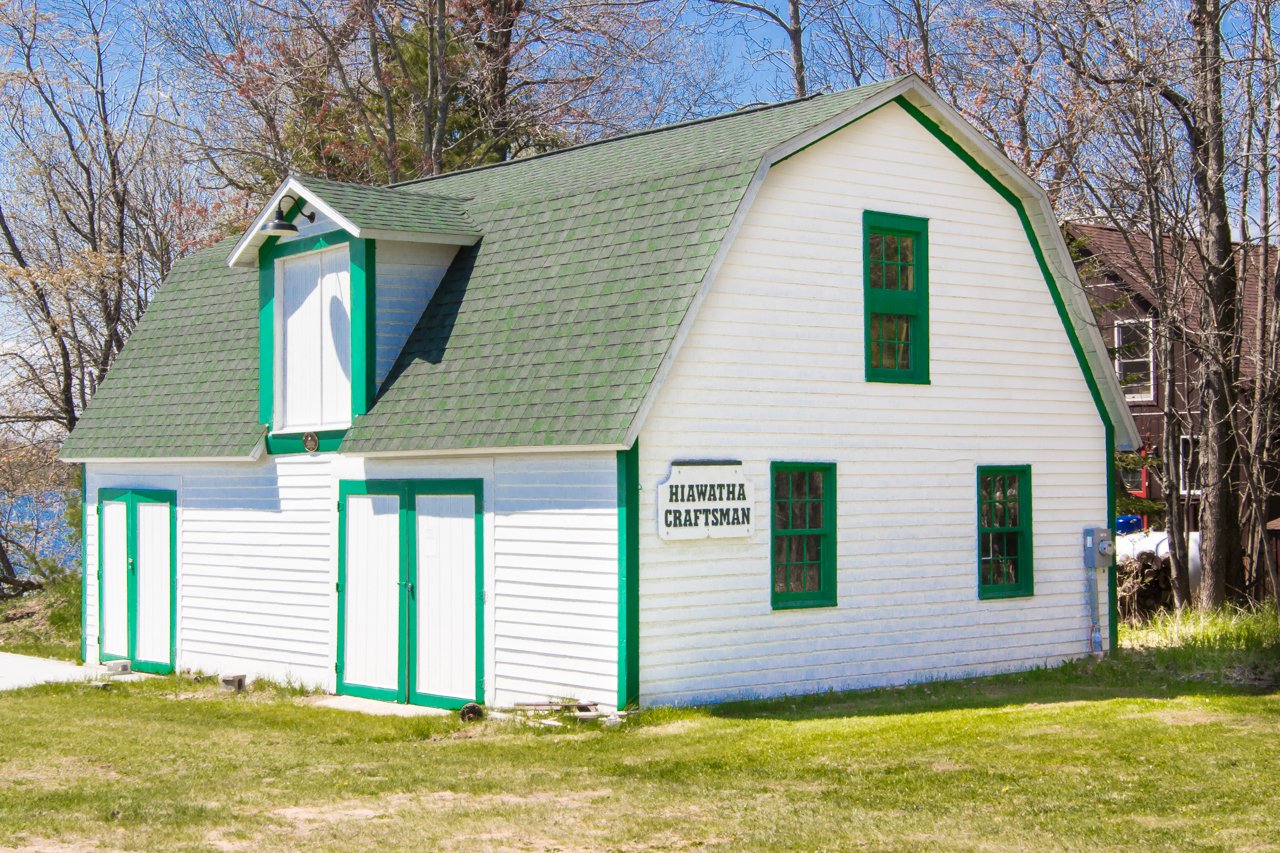
- Maintenance Building

- Location within Michigan
- Interactive map
- Nearest city: Millecoquins, Michigan
- Coordinates: 46°8′48″N 85°30′17″W
- NRHP reference No.: 11000865
- Added to NRHP: November 30, 2011

The Hiawatha Sportsman's Club 1931 Maintenance Building and Commissary are two recreational buildings located on Lake Boulevard, on the grounds of the Hiawatha Sportsman's Club, near Millecoquins, Michigan. The buildings were listed on the National Register of Historic Places in 2011. They are about two miles (3.2 km) from the Manitou Lodge, also on the grounds of the Hiawatha Sportsman's Club and listed on the National Register at the same time.

== History ==
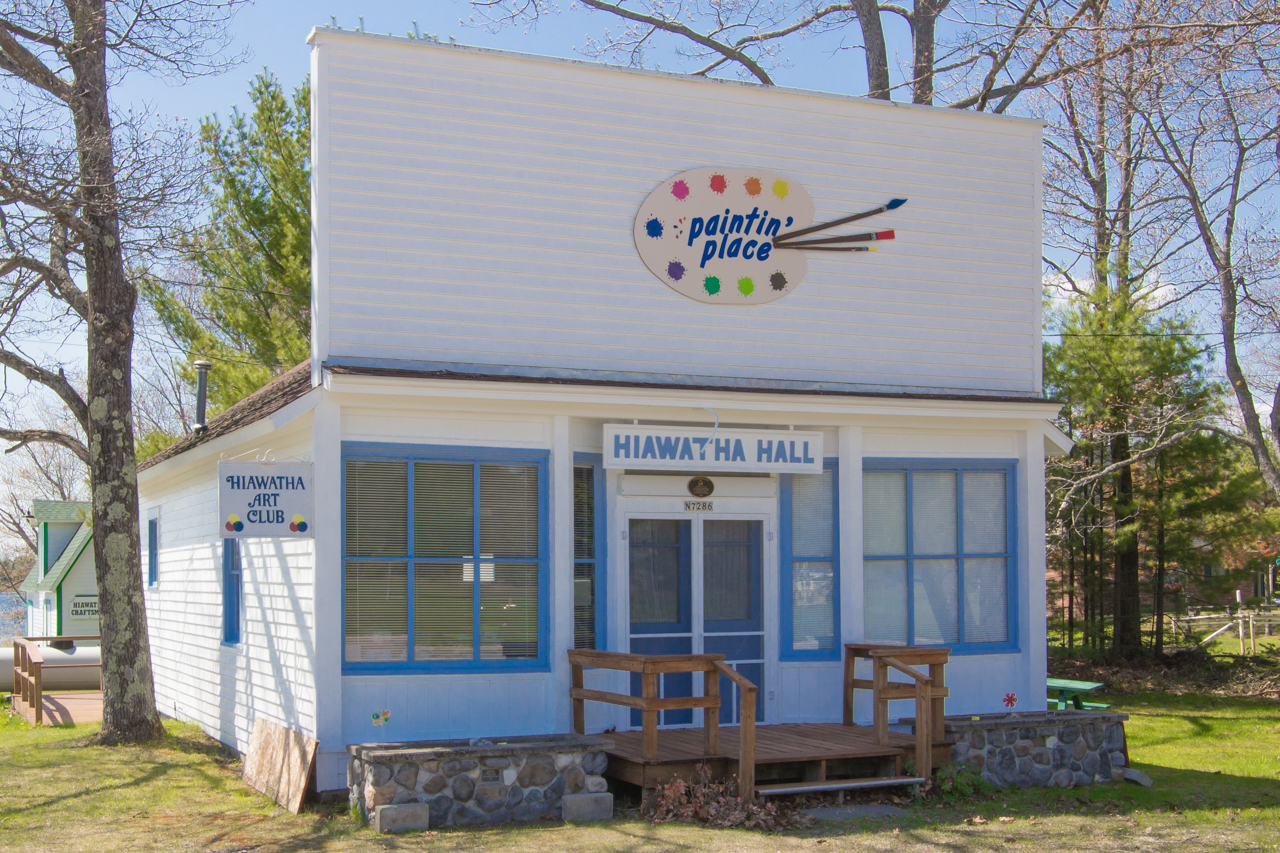
Commissary Building

In the 1920s, Dr. William E. McNamara of Lansing, Michigan purchased 32,000 acres (13,000 ha) of land in Michigan's Upper Peninsula. In 1927, McNamara organized the Hiawatha Sportsman's Club for the purpose of hunting, fishing, and relaxing in a relatively unspoiled environment.

In the late 1920s, the population of Engadine, Michigan, was dwindling due to the description of the main industry in town. In 1931, the club purchased an empty Engadine store and moved it onto the club property to serve as a commissary. The first two commissary managers went on to found grocery stores in nearby towns: Joseph Patrick Rahilly in Newberry, Michigan, and Emmet Joseph Vallier in Naubinway, Michigan. The commissary is currently used by the Hiawatha Sportsman's Club Art Group for painting.

Also in 1931, the club constructed a clapboard-covered frame structure nearby to use as a maintenance building. The building served as the maintenance center for the club until 1946; it was used for storage until the mid-1970s.
