= M117 =

M117 may refer to:

- M117 bomb
- M-117 (Michigan highway)
- Mercedes-Benz M117 engine
