= Milakokia River =

River in the Upper Peninsula of Michigan

- Location within Michigan Location within the United States

Location
- Country: United States
- State: Michigan

Physical characteristics
- Source: Milakokia Lake
  - coordinates: 46.0777222°N 85.8070418°W
- Mouth: Lake Michigan
  - location: Port Inland
  - coordinates: 45.9672044°N 85.8937247°W
  - elevation: 581 ft (177 m)
- Length: 17.6 mi (28.3 km)

The Milakokia River (/ˌmɪləkʊˈkaɪə/ mill-ə-cook-EYE-ə) is a 17.6-mile-long (28.3 km) river on the Upper Peninsula of Michigan in the United States. It flows through Mackinac County and Schoolcraft County before emptying into Lake Michigan near Port Inland. The source of the river is Milakokia Lake.

== See also ==
- List of rivers of Michigan
