= Gilchrist, Michigan =

Gilchrist may refer to the following places in the U.S. state of Michigan:

- Gilchrist, Allegan County, Michigan
- Gilchrist, Mackinac County, Michigan
