= Manitou Lodge =

- U.S. National Register of Historic Places
- Michigan State Historic Site
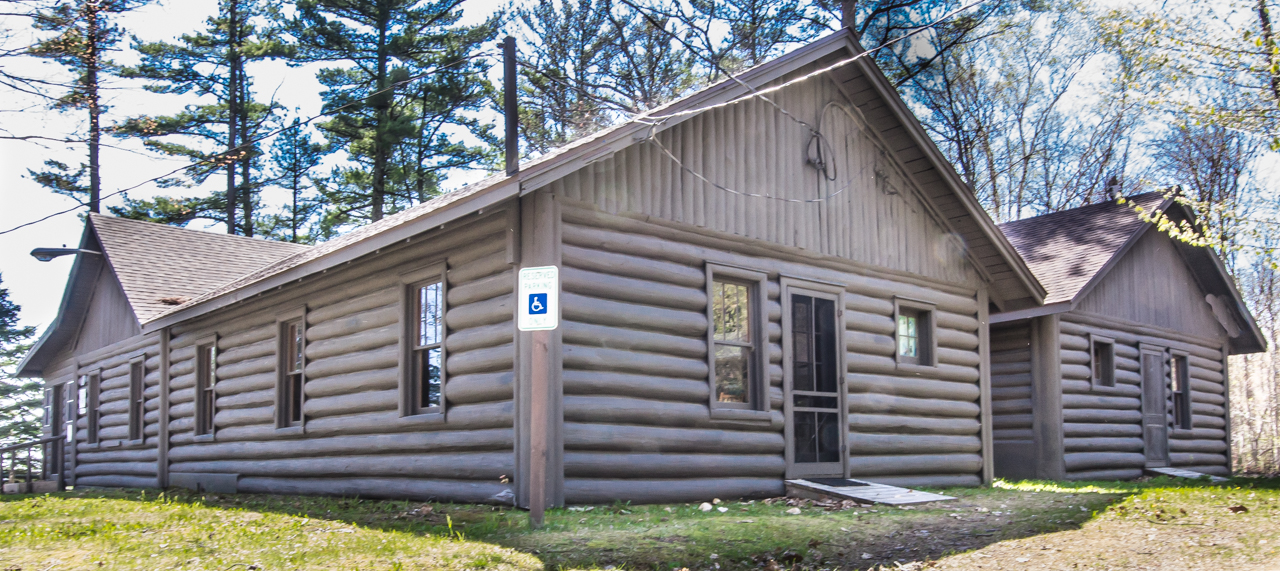

- Location within Michigan Location within the United States
- Interactive map
- Location: G Trail, at the Hiawatha Sportman's Club
- Nearest city: Naubinway, Michigan
- Coordinates: 46°6′8″N 85°27′37″W
- Built: 1931
- Architect: George Bunn, Harold G. Benriter
- NRHP reference No.: 11000866

Significant dates
- Added to NRHP: November 30, 2011
- Designated MSHS: January 23, 1997

The Manitou Lodge is a recreational building located on G Trail, on the grounds of the Hiawatha Sportman's Club, near Naubinway, Michigan. It was designated a Michigan State Historic Site in 1997 and listed on the National Register of Historic Places in 2011. It is about two miles from the Hiawatha Sportsman's Club 1931 Maintenance Building and Commissary, also on the grounds of the Hiawatha Sportsman's Club and listed on the National Register at the same time.

== History ==
In the 1920s, Dr. William E. McNamara of Lansing, Michigan purchased 32,000 acres of land in Michigan's Upper Peninsula. In 1927, McNamara organized the Hiawatha Sportsman's Club for the purpose of hunting, fishing, and relaxing in a relatively unspoiled environment. In 1930, the club, led by McNamara, put together a team or architects and contractors to construct a hotel on club property. The original design specified a hotel with 50 rooms and a screened porch 88 feet (27 m) long running along the front of the building. However, the Great Depression changed economic conditions, and the original design was scaled down to one containing 16 rooms, a lobby, and a 56 feet (17 m) screened porch. The final building included design elements from both Philadelphia architect George Bunn and Lansing architect Harold G. Benriter.

The building was constructed in 1931, using logs cut on the club's property and limestone from a quarry also on the club's property. The limestone fireplace in the lobby was designed and constructed by Barryton, Michigan masons Lloyd, Martin and Lormer Eisenbach. The lodge served as a quiet facility for club members to stay at, in contrast to cabins on Lake Millecoquins that could also be rented.

However, in 1962, the nearby dining hall burned down, and was not replaced. Members use of the lodge decreased. The lodge is currently used by the Hiawatha Sportsman's Club as a library and museum, and it is not open to the public.

== Description ==
The Hiawatha Sportsman's Club's Manitou Lodge is sited on a bluff overlooking Naubinway and Lake Michigan. The lodge is "an excellent example" of log construction. It is still in original condition, and consists of a lobby and sleeping rooms. The main section is a gable-end structure with a low pitched roof, and contains the lobby. The lobby interior showcases exposed roof beams and a large limestone fireplace. A 12 feet (3.7 m) by 56 feet (17 m) screened porch runs along the south side of the building, and provides a view of the lake. Two gable-end wings on the north side, mirror images of each other, house the sleeping rooms.
