= Newton Township, Mackinac County, Michigan =

Newton Township, Michigan
- Civil township
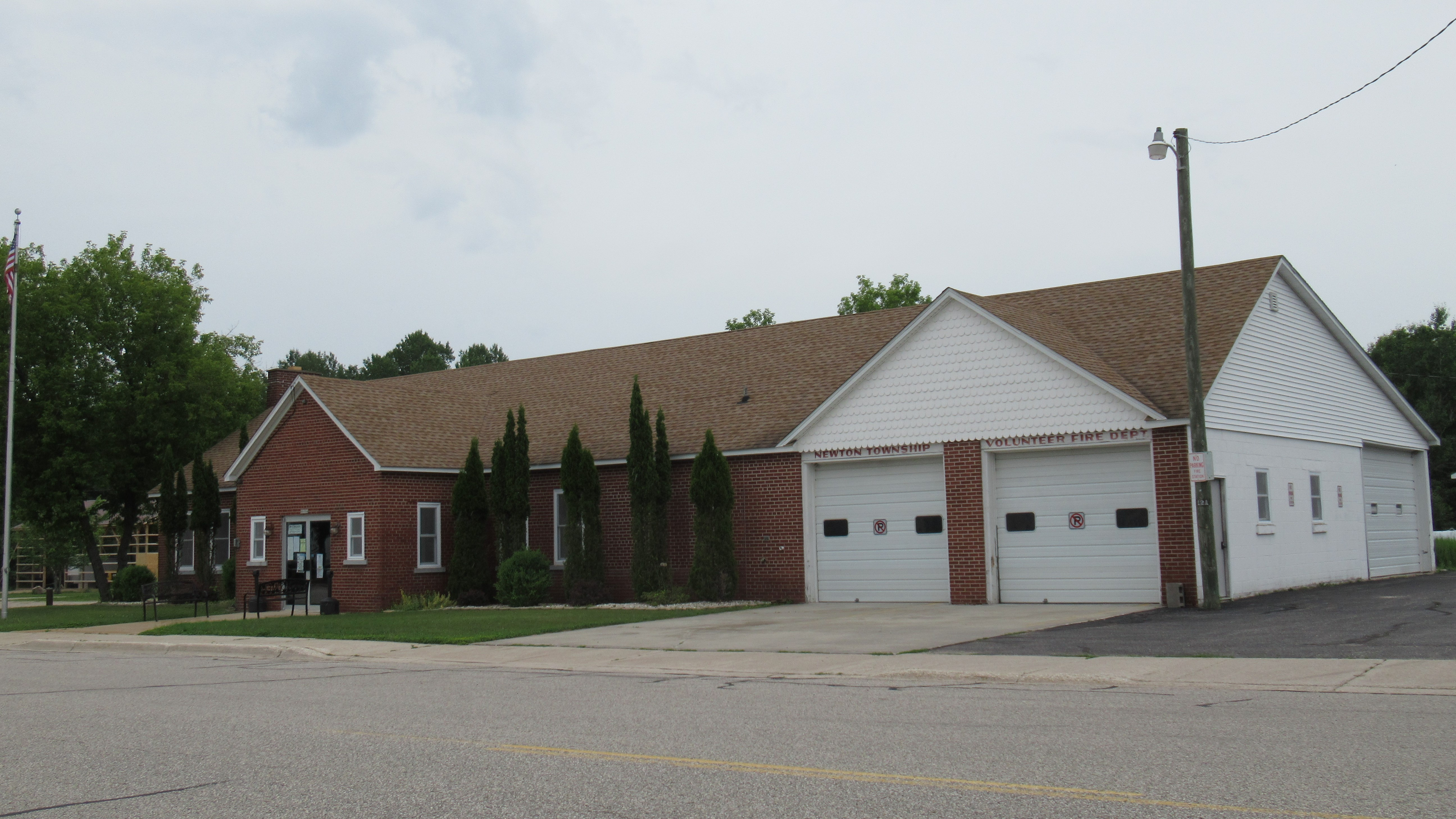
- Newton Township Office and Fire Department

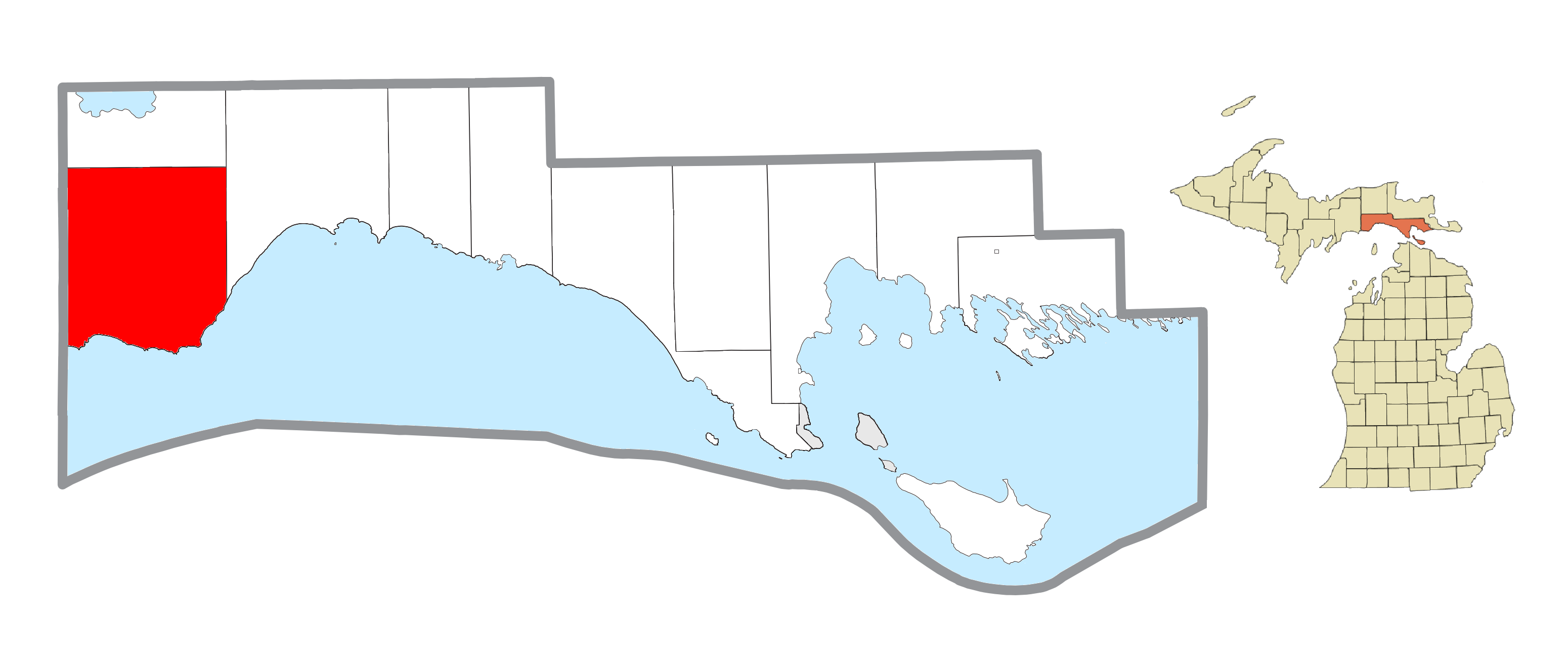
- Location within Mackinac County

- Location within the state of Michigan Location within the United States
- Coordinates: 46°04′46″N 85°42′23″W
- Country: United States
- State: Michigan
- County: Mackinac
- Established: 1878

Government
  - Supervisor: Frederick Burton
  - Clerk: Nikki Tremblay

Area
  - Total: 154.91 sq mi (401.22 km^{2})
  - Land: 148.60 sq mi (384.87 km^{2})
  - Water: 6.31 sq mi (16.34 km^{2})
- Elevation: 750 ft (230 m)

Population (2020)
  - Total: 430
  - Density: 2.87/sq mi (1.11/km^{2})
- Time zone: UTC-5 (Eastern (EST))
  - Summer (DST): UTC-4 (EDT)
- ZIP code(s): 49838 (Gould City); 49820 (Curtis); 49827 (Engadine)
- Area code: 906
- FIPS code: 26-097-57640
- GNIS feature ID: 1626805
- Website: newtontownshipgouldcity.com

Newton Township is a civil township of Mackinac County in the U.S. state of Michigan. As of 2020, its population was 430.

== History ==
The area was settled as early as 1765 by the St. Helena Island fisheries, which was operated by the Newton Brothers firm. The township itself was formally organized much later in 1878 and named after Nelson Newton.

== Geography ==
The township is in western Mackinac County, on the northern shore of Lake Michigan. It is bordered to the north by Portage Township and to the east by Garfield Township, both in Mackinac County, and to the west by Mueller Township in Schoolcraft County. St. Ignace, the Mackinac county seat, is 50 miles (80 km) to the east via US Highway 2, and Manistique is 30 miles (48 km) to the west.

According to the U.S. Census Bureau, Newton Township has a total area of 154.91 square miles (401.22 km^{2}), of which 148.60 square miles (384.87 km^{2}) are land and 6.31 square miles (16.34 km^{2}) (4.07%) are water.

Milakokia Lake is a 1,956-acre (792 ha) lake found on the western side of the township.

=== Communities ===
- Bryan was founded in 1905 as the railroad stop for the Escanaba Lumber Company. A village was laid out next to the railroad stop by William P. Bryan. It had a post office from 1906 until 1920. By that year lumbering operations in the area had ended, and within a decade the place was entirely abandoned.
- Corinne was a lumbering settlement and station on the Minneapolis, St. Paul and Sault Ste. Marie Railroad. It had a post office from 1889 until 1942 named "Viola".
- Gould City is an unincorporated community just south of US 2 at 46°05′43″N 85°41′48″W. It was founded in 1886 by Samuel Stites, a grocer and lumberman, who named it for another lumberman. It was also a station on the Minneapolis, St. Paul and Sault Ste. Marie Railroad. A post office was established in September 1888. The Gould City 49838 ZIP Code serves most of the township.
- Simmons is a former settlement that centered around a mill operated by the Simmons Lumber Company. A post office operated in Simmons from May 20, 1903, until February 15, 1911. It should not be confused with a different unincorporated community of the same name located in Marquette Township to the east.

== Demographics ==
As of 2020, the population of the township was 430, and the median household income was $30,313.

== Transportation ==
Indian Trails provides daily intercity bus service via Gould City between St. Ignace and Ironwood, Michigan.
