= Milakokia Lake =

Lake in Mackinac County, Michigan, United States

- Pike Lake
- Location within Michigan Location within the United States
- Location: Newton Township, Mackinac County, Michigan
- Coordinates: 46.0777222°N 85.8070418°W
- Primary inflows: Quarry Creek
- Primary outflows: Milakokia River
- Basin countries: United States
- Surface area: 1,956 acres (792 ha)
- Max. depth: 26 feet (7.9 m)
- Surface elevation: 732 feet (223 m)

Milakokia Lake (/ˌmɪləkʊˈkaɪə/ mill-ə-cook-EYE-ə) is a 1,956-acre (792 ha) lake in Newton Township, Mackinac County, Michigan. The bottom of the lake is mainly flat, with the exception of the southeast corner and it has a maximum depth of 26 feet (7.9 m). Milakokia Lake is the headwaters for the Milakokia River, which flows from the lake into Lake Michigan. The Milakokia Lake Management Area borders the lake and surrounding areas. The Management Area consists of 14,387 acres of state-owned land in Schoolcraft and Mackinac Counties. There is a large limestone quarry to the west of the lake.

== See also ==
- List of lakes in Michigan
