= Gould City, Michigan =

- Unincorporated community
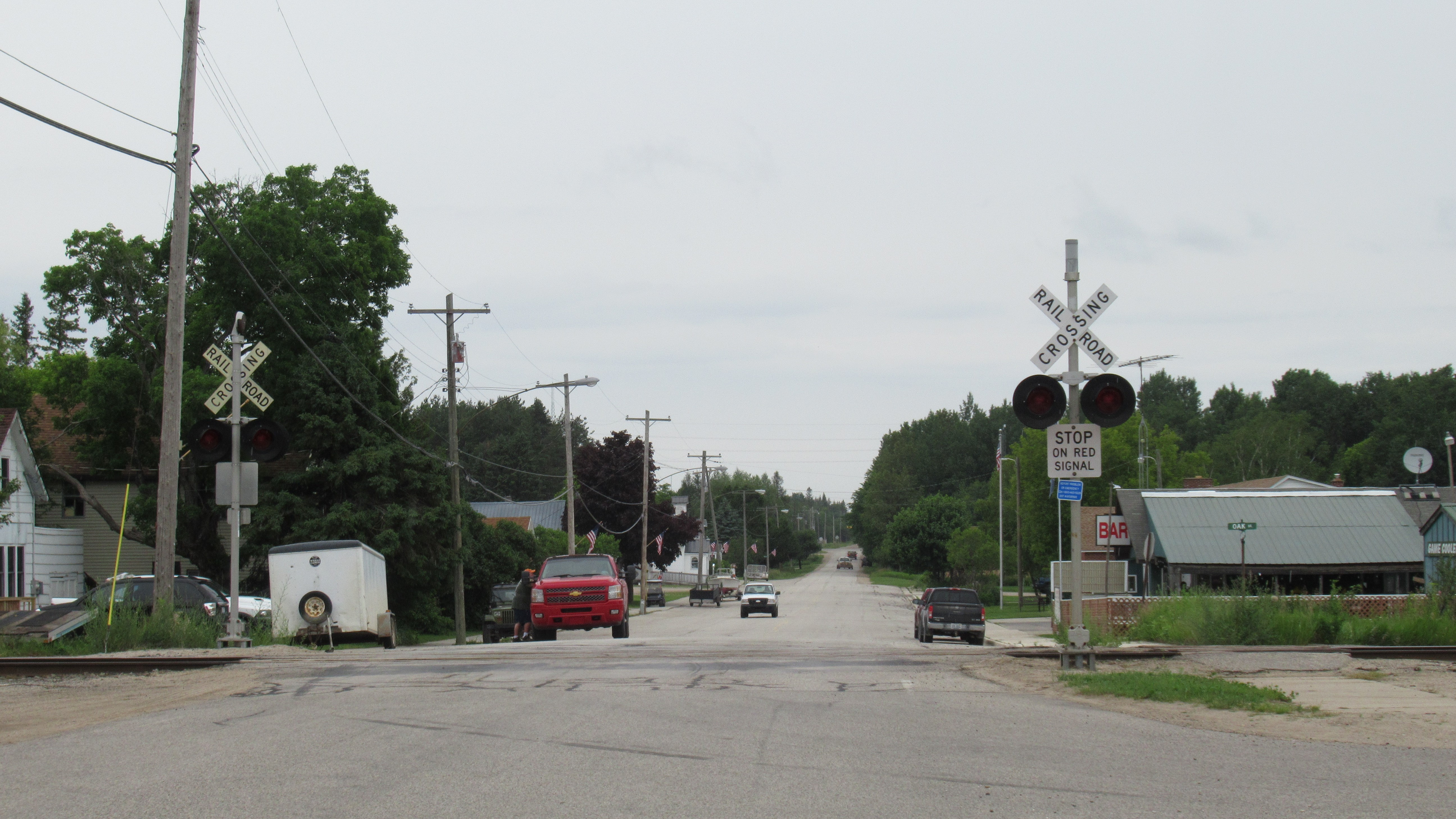
- Looking north along S. Gould City Road

- Location within the state of Michigan Location within the United States
- Coordinates: 46°05′43″N 85°41′48″W
- Country: United States
- State: Michigan
- County: Mackinac
- Township: Newton
- Settled: 1886
- Established: 1888
- Elevation: 742 ft (226 m)
- Time zone: UTC-5 (Eastern (EST))
  - Summer (DST): UTC-4 (EDT)
- ZIP code(s): 49838
- Area code: 906
- GNIS feature ID: 627018

Gould City is an unincorporated community in Mackinac County in the U.S. state of Michigan. The community is located within Newton Township. As an unincorporated community, Gould City has no legal autonomy of its own but does have its own post office with the 49838 ZIP Code.

== History ==
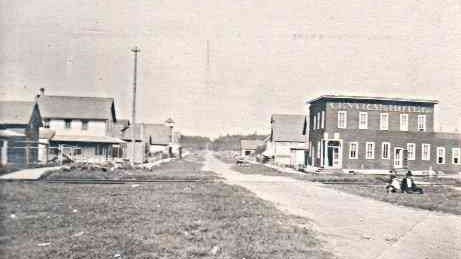
Gould City in 1907

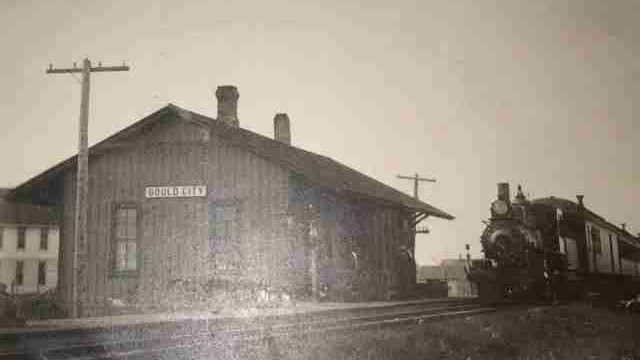
Gould City train depot in 1910

Newton Township itself was formally organized in 1878. Gould City was first settled as early as 1886 by Sam Stiles, who was a lumberman and also opened a grocery store in the area. The community's post office opened on September 26, 1888 with Adolph Highstone serving as the first postmaster. The post office has operated continuously ever since. Stiles named the community after the Gould family, who were among the first commercial fishermen on the northern Lake Michigan shoreline, as well as fellow lumbermen with Stiles.

By 1893, the community received a railway station along the Minneapolis, St. Paul and Sault Ste. Marie Railroad (Soo Line Railroad). At the time, Gould City contained a post office, several general stores, cedar mill, and pharmacy. The lumber boom reached Gould City by 1905, and lumber development was extensive in the area. At the height of the community's growth, it contained numerous sawmills, two churches, two hotels, two saloons, and many other small businesses. In 1910, Gould City's population reached its peak at around 200 permanent residents. While the lumber industry began declining after this time, Gould City's lumber industry continued into the 1930s.

Many of the buildings in the community were destroyed by a fire in 1929, and very few buildings before that time remain standing. Beginning in the 1940s, U.S. Route 2 was constructed just to the north of Gould City and provided a major transportation route through the area. Of the original two churches in Gould City, the Catholic church shut down and was razed around 1971. The other church, the Community Presbyterian Church, remains open. Among the other oldest buildings in the community include McNeil's Bar, which occupies a building that was once Charles May's hotel. He was a local resident who later served as a member of the Michigan House of Representatives. The railway line remains active and is operated by the Canadian National Railway but no longer contains a stop or railway station within Gould City.

== Geography ==
Gould City is a rural community located in central Newton Township about 30 miles (48 km) east of the city of Manistique and about 70 miles (110 km) northwest of St. Ignace. Gould City sits at an elevation of 742 feet (226 m) above sea level. The community is located about 0.5 miles (0.8 km) south of U.S. Highway 2 (Lake Michigan Scenic Highway) and is centered along South Gould City Road. Other nearby communities include Corinne just to the southwest, Curtis and Helmer to the north, Engadine and Naubinway to the east, and Blaney Park to the west. Lake Michigan is about 10 miles (16 km) to the south, and some of the surrounding areas are included as parts of the Sault Ste. Marie portion of Lake Superior State Forest.

Gould City contains its own post office that uses the 49838 ZIP Code. The post office is located at N6116 South Gould City Road in the center of the community. The ZIP Code serves a much larger area that includes the majority of Newton Township, as well as a very small portion of Portage Township to the north and Garfield Township to the east.

The community is served by Engadine Consolidated Schools, which is located to the east in the community of Engadine. The Newton Township Office is located in the center of the community at N6164 South Gould City Road, and the building also contains the Newton Township Volunteer Fire Department. As most of Newton Township uses the Gould City ZIP Code, the two names are often used interchangeably, such as the Gould City Township Park located much further to the south on Lake Michigan.

== Images ==
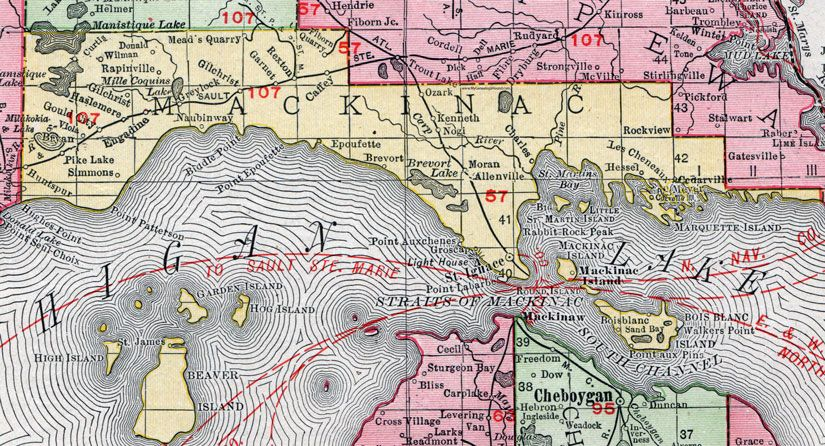
Gould City listed on a 1911 county map

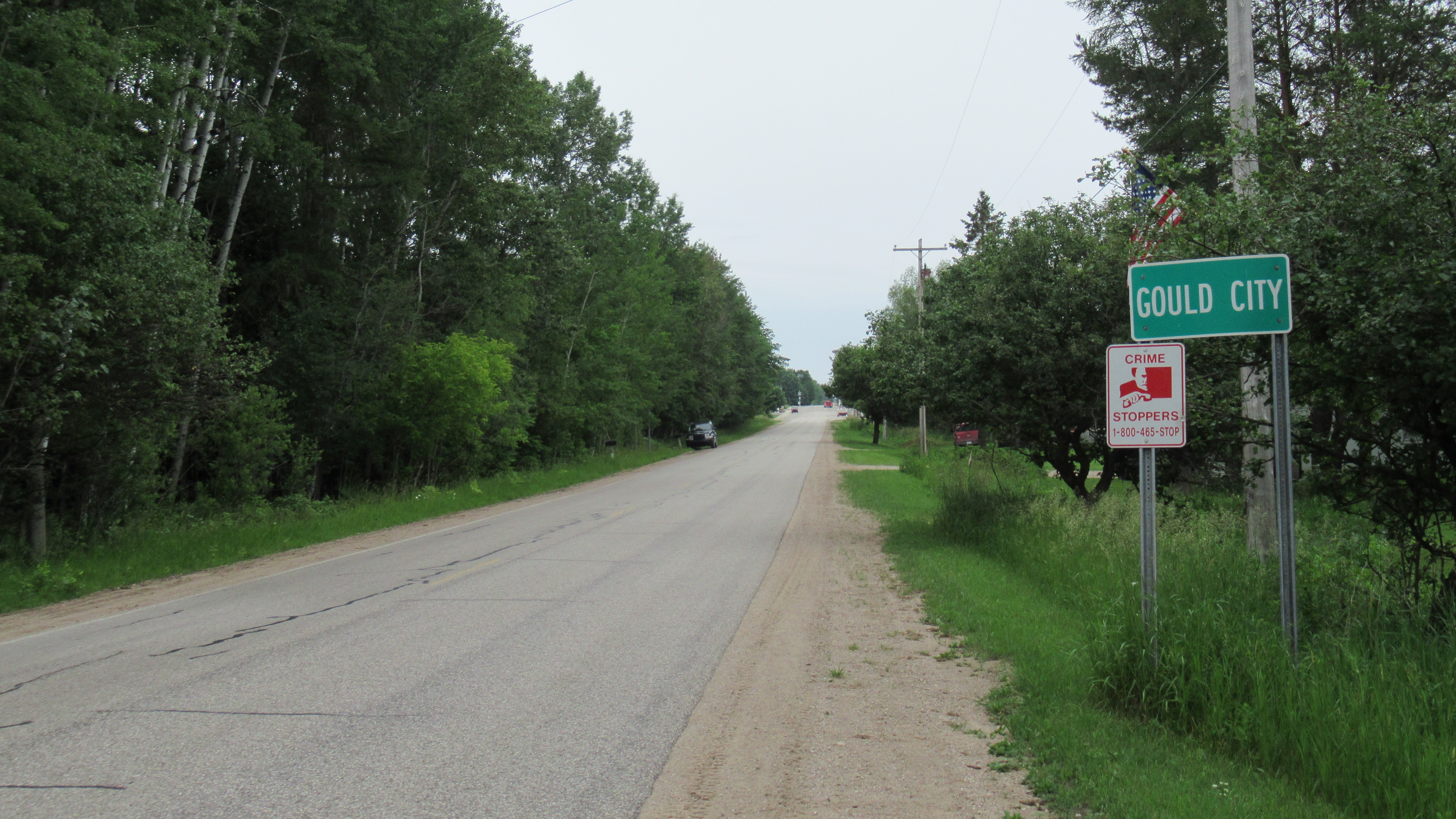
Road signage along Gould City Road

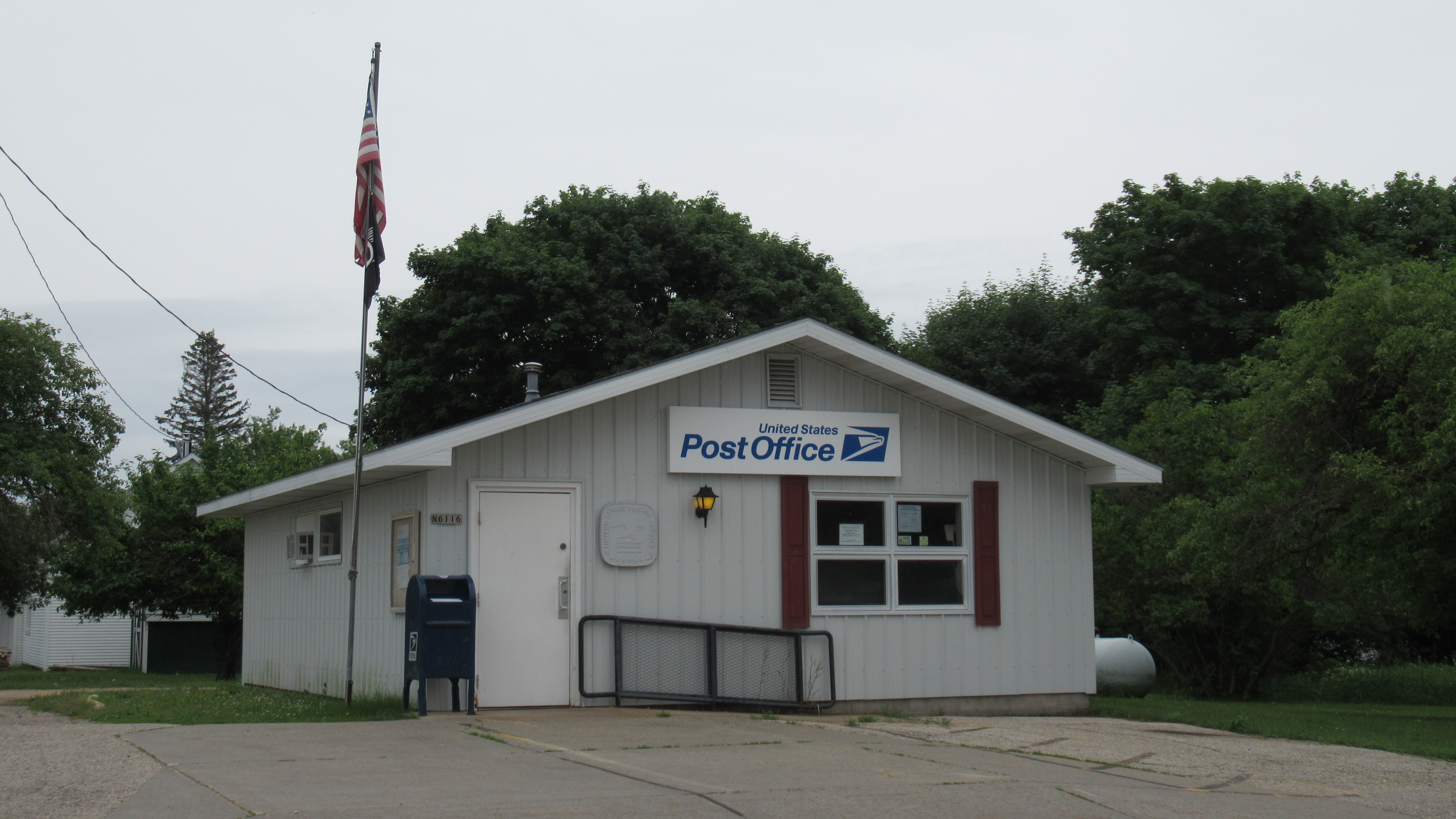
U.S. Post Office in Gould City

== See also ==
- Scott Point site, an archaeological site located south of Gould City near the shores of Lake Michigan
