= Scott Point Site =

Archaeological site in Michigan, United States

- U.S. National Register of Historic Places
- Location within Michigan Location within the United States
- Location: near Scott Point, west of Point Patterson
- Nearest city: Gould City, Michigan
- Coordinates: 45°57′44″N 85°42′0″W
- Area: 1 acre (0.40 ha)
- NRHP reference No.: 76001032
- Added to NRHP: July 30, 1976

The Scott Point Site, also known as 20MK22 or (erroneously) as the Point Patterson Site, is an archaeological site located near the shore of Lake Michigan near Scott Point, south of Gould City, Michigan and west of Point Patterson. It was listed on the National Register of Historic Places in 1976.

== Description ==
The Scott Point Site is located about 300 to 400 feet (91 to 122 m) inland from a small sandy bay on the shore of Lake Michigan, in Section 8, Township 41 North, Range 11 West. The adjacent shoreline is relatively rocky, making this bay the best canoe landing place in the immediate area. The site covers approximately 1 acre (0.40 ha), much of which has been exposed by sand erosion.

The site was once a Late Woodland period village, with groupings of fire-damaged rocks indicating the locations of hearths. Pottery sherds, flint arrowheads and scrapers, hammerstones, and bone tools were collected at the site. The site also included numerous fish remains, as well as the remains of deer, moose, and beaver. The site was likely a seasonal fall fishing village similar to the nearby Juntunen site. A nearby burial site, designated 20MK450, may have been associated with this village.

== History ==
The Scott Point Site was examined by archaeologist George Quimby multiple times in the early 1960s.
