= Juntunen site =

Archaeological site in Michigan, United States

- Juntunen Site
- U.S. National Register of Historic Places
- Aerial view of the Juntunen Site

- Location within Michigan Location within the United States
- Location: Western tip of Bois Blanc Island
- Coordinates: 45°49′0″N 84°35′0″W
- Area: 2 acres (0.81 ha)
- NRHP reference No.: 78001504
- Added to NRHP: March 21, 1978

The Juntunen Site, also known as 20MK1, is a stratified prehistoric Late Woodland fishing village located on the western tip of Bois Blanc Island. It was listed on the National Register of Historic Places in 1978.

== Description ==
The Juntunen Site is located on a low sand beach about 600 feet from and 17 feet above the current lakeshore. The site was a large seasonal fishing camp covering approximately 2 acres (0.81 ha). It was likely a seasonal fall fishing village similar to the nearby Scott Point site. The site also contains five ossuaries, plus an infant burial and additional remains collected from the surface. The site was used during the Late Woodland period (c. 800 A.D.-1400 A.D.) The burials primarily dated from 1200 to 1400 AD. The frequent but seasonal occupation of the site led to a stratified layering of archaeological remains at the site, consisting of up to 25 separate layers.

== History ==
The Juntunen Site was discovered in 1932 by Robert Braidwood of the University of Michigan, who found human remains eroding from the surface of a group of mounds. Excavations were carried out over the next few years. Mr. Charles Juntunen, the property owner of the site, discovered more remains in 1959 while bulldozing a road. Juntunen contacted The University of Michigan, and the University's Alan McPherron and James Griffin conducted multiple excavations from 1960 to 1963.

== Results of 1960–1963 excavations ==
The excavations yielded features, human burials, prehistoric artifacts, animal bone, and plant remains.

The excavators recorded 25 stratigraphic layers which represented 6 occupations and 3 phases with 2 intermediate phases where the site was apparently unoccupied for extended periods of time:

- Mackinac Phase, c. 800 A.D. – 910 A.D., occupations A and B, stratigraphic layers I–XIV
- Intermediate I Phase, c. 910 A.D. – 1000 A.D., occupation C, stratigraphic layer XV–XV
- Bois Blanc Phase, c. 1000 A.D. – 1200 A.D., occupation D, stratigraphic layers XVI–XIX
- Intermediate II Phase, c. 1200 A.D. – 1250 A.D., stratigraphic layers XX–XXI
- Juntunen Phase, c. 1250 A.D. – 1400 A.D., occupations E and F, stratigraphic layers XXII–XXV

Excluding the intermediate phases, the sequence is generalized as: Mackinac Phase, c. 800 A.D.-1000 A.D.; Bois Blanc Phase 1000 A.D.-1200 A.D.; Juntunen Phase 1200-1400 A.D.

=== Features ===
Features present at the site included hearths, pits (large and small) and animal burials (dog, snowshoe hare and bald eagle). Hundreds of post molds were found but except for the outlines of a longhouse, no other structures could be discerned.

=== Human burials ===
There were 65 burials, some of them in ossuaries. The presence of ossuaries is evidence of cultural practices which are documented in early historic accounts of the Huron Feast of the Dead and similar ceremonies. 10 out of the 65 burials had a piece or plaque of bone from the cranium removed, a practice not seen in early historic times.

=== Animal bone ===
The major species present were sturgeon, whitefish, beaver, bald eagle, dog (both as food and ceremonial burials), loon and walleye. Fully 85% of the bones belonged to fish species. These bones were unmodified, unlike the worked bone artifacts discussed in the “Artifacts” section, and are interpreted as food remains.

=== Plant remains ===
Several plant remains were recovered from the site, including birch bark, hazelnut, maize, fire cherry and blackberry. Juntunen marks the furthest northerly appearance of maize in the prehistoric archaeological record.

=== Artifacts ===
Artifacts recovered from the site included:

- Pottery (101,477 sherds representing at least 631 vessels)
- Stone tools including 245 scrapers and 198 projectile points (of which 133 were triangular Juntunen points as defined by the excavators)
- Ground stone artifacts (11), including celts and adzes
- Bone tools (120) – including 69 awls and 9 harpoon heads
- Copper artifacts – Juntunen is the only known copper manufacturing site in the Late Woodland. Including wastage and raw materials, 776 copper artifacts were present. Of the finished products, the most common categories were awls (57) and beads (25)

One individual buried in one of the ossuaries contained an unusual personal kit containing tools, skins, animal bones, a red stone tablet and a strike-a-light set. No other individuals had grave goods so it may be that this individual was prominent in the community or that he was a shaman or medicine man.

=== Late Woodland occupations and associated pottery types ===
Due to the extremely large sample size of pottery sherds, and the stratified nature of the site, the researchers were able to present a detailed record of cultural development and discern relationships with other regions.

Three indigenous Late Woodland phases of pottery types were identified: Mackinac, Bois Blanc and Juntunen. In addition, 4 "foreign" pottery types were also present: Late Woodland Blackduck and Point Sauble, Upper Mississippian Oneota and Middle Mississippian Ramey ware. A few other pottery types were also present in trace amounts.

Miniature vessels were also present at Juntunen (91 sherds representing at least 21 vessels). These are common at other sites in the area and could be interpreted as “toy” pots or attempts by young children to practice making pottery.

==== Mackinac ware ====
1,713 sherds were recovered, representing at least 631 vessels. This pottery is characterized by rounded, generally squat vessels with well-defined shoulders and tempered by coarse grit temper. Surface finish is generally cord-wrapped paddle impressed with decorations applied by cord-wrapped paddle or twisted cords and punctates. No collars or castellations appear during this phase. Similar pottery dating to the Late Woodland has been reported from the Heins Creek site in Wisconsin.

Five types of Mackinaw ware are defined:

- Mackinac undecorated – 299 rim sherds, representing at least 169 vessels. Characterized by undecorated surfaces and notched, splayed or outrolled lips.
- Mackinac punctate – 392 rim sherds, representing at least 157 vessels. Characterized by various types and patterns of decoration using punctates; lips are thickened and splayed or outrolled.
- Mackinac cord impressed – 275 rim and decorated body sherds, representing at least 108 vessels. Characterized by patterns of horizontal or vertical bands of cord-wrapped stick impressions.
- Mackinac banded – 722 rim and decorated body sherds, representing at least 182 vessels. Characterized by horizontal bands of decoration produced by cord-wrapped stick and/or paddle, and punctates produced by a sharp tool.
- Mackinac zigzag lip – 25 rim sherds representing at least 15 vessels. Characterized by thickened lips decorated in zigzag patterns by cord-wrapped object impressions.

==== Bois Blanc ware ====
793 sherds were recovered, representing at least 138 vessels. Characterized by rounded vessels lacking the well-defined shoulders of Mackinac Ware; cord-wrapped stick and twisted cord exterior decoration; lips thickened by either folding over the clay or addition of a clay strip; and castellated, straight to slightly everted rims. This pottery has similarities to other Late Woodland wares including Blackduck, Heins Creek and Point Sauble.

Three types of Bois Blanc ware are defined:

- Bois Blanc braced rim – 496 rim and decorated body sherds, representing at least 108 vessels. Characterized by braced rims created by adding a strip or molding lip and rim. Rims are castellated and profiles straight to slightly excurved. Surface treatment similar to Mackinac Ware.
- Bois Blanc banded – 239 rim and decorated body sherds representing at least 25 vessels. Characterized by rims thickened by a strip of beading.
- Bois Blanc castellated corded – 58 sherds representing a minimum of 5 vessels. Characterized by castellated, unthickened rims; little rim outflare or eversion; cord and cord wrapped object decoration with punctates.

==== Juntunen ware ====
1,031 rim and decorated body sherds were recovered, representing at least 309 vessels. This pottery is characterized by round bodied vessels without pronounced shoulders; less decoration with cords and cord-wrapped objects; collared and everted rims; punctate and drag-and-jab decoration. Similar to pottery found in Southwest Ontario including early Ontario Iroquois.

Three types of Juntunen ware are defined:

- Juntunen linear punctate – 96 sherds representing at least 6 vessels. Characterized by smoothed-over cordmarked surface with bands of linear punctations on the collar.
- Juntunen collared – 35 sherds representing at least 22 vessels. Characterized by a coarser paste and larger temper particles; smooth surface lacking any cord-wrapped stick treatment; and decorated rims.
- Juntunen drag-and-jab – 893 sherds representing at least 281 vessels. Characterized by cord-wrapped paddle surface finish decorated in a variety of motifs, including drag-and-jab; rims collared and castellated.

==== Blackduck ware ====
154 rim sherds representing at least 45 vessels of Blackduck Ware was also present at the site. Blackduck was a Late Woodland culture encompassing a vast territory in Canada and the extreme north of the United States, centered on the north shore of Lake Superior. Blackduck has been dated from about 900 A.D. to early Historic period (c. 1600s A.D.). The Blackduck pottery is characterized by rounded vessels with recurved rims; cordmarked surfaces decorated by cord-wrapped stick or by punctates. It appears at Juntunen in Occupation A in the Mackinac Phase and may extend into the Bois Blanc Phase but was probably no longer being made during the Juntunen Phase.

Earlier researchers have developed typologies for Blackduck, but the researchers at Juntunen recognized 2 types defined from the Juntunen assemblage:

- Blackduck banded – 46 rim sherds representing at least 20 vessels. Characterized by horizontal bands of cord-wrapped stick impressions associated with punctuate decoration.
- Blackduck punctate – 98 rim sherds representing at least 25 vessels. Like Blackduck Banded except decorations are limited to punctates.

==== Point Sauble collared ====
Point Sauble collared is a pottery type associated with the Late Woodland Effigy Mound culture of eastern Wisconsin. 40 sherds representing at least 15 vessels were recovered at Juntunen, mostly associated with the Bois Blanc Phase. Similar pottery has been reported from Aztalan, a Middle Mississippian site in southern Wisconsin. This pottery is characterized by cordmarked surfaces and cord-wrapped stick decoration on the rim and neck. Rims are braced and the 2 of the Juntunen specimens have angular orifices like those reported at Aztalan.

==== Ramey incised ====
Eleven sherds representing a single vessel were present at Juntunen. Ramey Incised is a Middle Mississippian pottery type first identified at the Cahokia Old Village site in southern Illinois. It has also been recovered at Carcajou Point in Wisconsin, but its presence at Juntunen marks the northernmost occurrence of any Middle Mississippian pottery type. Tempering is shell-tempered mixed with grit and decoration is a distinctive pattern of curvilinear designs. The vessel shape is thought to be a bowl with sharply defined shoulder. It was recovered in intermediate strata between the Bois Blanc and Juntunen Phases.

==== Oneota ware ====
Oneota is an Upper Mississippian ware from Wisconsin and surrounding states. It is generally a shell-tempered ware but the specimens from Juntunen were almost all grit-tempered. 212 rim and body sherds representing at least 35 vessels were grit-tempered, while only 6 sherds representing 1 vessel were shell-tempered. The Juntunen specimens were characterized by flared rims, smooth surfaces, and scalloped, crimped or finger-pinched lips. One sherd was finger-trailed but otherwise all sherds were undecorated. No handles were observed. The Oneota at Juntunen is similar to the Oneota component at the Mero site in Wisconsin.

== Significance ==
The Juntunen Site provides a detailed record of Late Woodland cultural development from approximately 800 A.D. through the 1400s A.D. Because of its centralized location relative to the Great Lakes, and the importance of water travel in prehistoric times, it shows influences from all directions. The Mackinac and Bois Blanc Phases tend to show affinities with Wisconsin cultures, while the Juntunen Phase tends to show influence from Ontario and the Iroquois Tradition, the Blackduck pottery shows influence from the north and the Middle Mississippian pottery shows influence from the south. Juntunen is also the northernmost site from which maize has been recovered.

Juntunen also shows signs of what would later become cultural practices of early historic tribes. It is suggested that the ossuary burials were a tradition that later grew into the elaborate ceremonies such as the Huron Feast of the Dead, after European contact and the fur trade had transformed Native American cultures in the region. The “medicine kit” recovered from one of the burials, and the bald eagle burial, anticipates the practices of religious groups in early historic tribes, such as the Midewiwin Society of the Algonkian tribe, or the False Face Society of the Iroquois. The practice of removing a plaque of the cranium of some burials, provides evidence of a prehistoric religious practice that had apparently disappeared by historic times.

The researchers determined the seasonality of the site to be May through October, based on analysis of the species of animal bone and plant remains present. This would coincide with the spawning season of the sturgeon (late spring to early summer) and the whitefish (in the fall). These are the two major categories of animal bone collected at the site.

The copper industry at Juntunen is also unique in the Late Woodland period. The last time copper had such a prominent role in artifact manufacture was in the Archaic Old Copper Culture (c. 3000 B.C.-1000 B.C.)

== Gallery ==
Juntunen points

Bone harpoons

Bone awls

Partially reconstructed Mackinac punctate vessels

Partially reconstructed Mackinac banded vessels

Partially reconstructed Bois Blanc braced rim vessel

Partially reconstructed Bois Blanc braced rim vessel with similarities to Blackduck pottery

Partially reconstructed Juntunen drag-and-jab vessel

Middle Mississippian Ramey incised sherds

Miniature children's vessel
