= Naubinway Island =

Island in Lake Michigan

- Location within Michigan Location within the United States

Geography
- Location: Lake Michigan
- Coordinates: 46.0755520°N 85.4453736°W
- Highest elevation: 581 ft (177.1 m)

Administration
- United States
- State: Michigan
- County: Mackinac County
- Township: Garfield Township

Naubinway Island is an island in Lake Michigan. It is located in Garfield Township, in Mackinac County, Michigan. The island lies just over a half mile south of Michigan's Upper Peninsula mainland. The unincorporated community of Naubinway is north of the island.
