= Naubinway, Michigan =

- Census-designated place (CDP) and unincorporated community
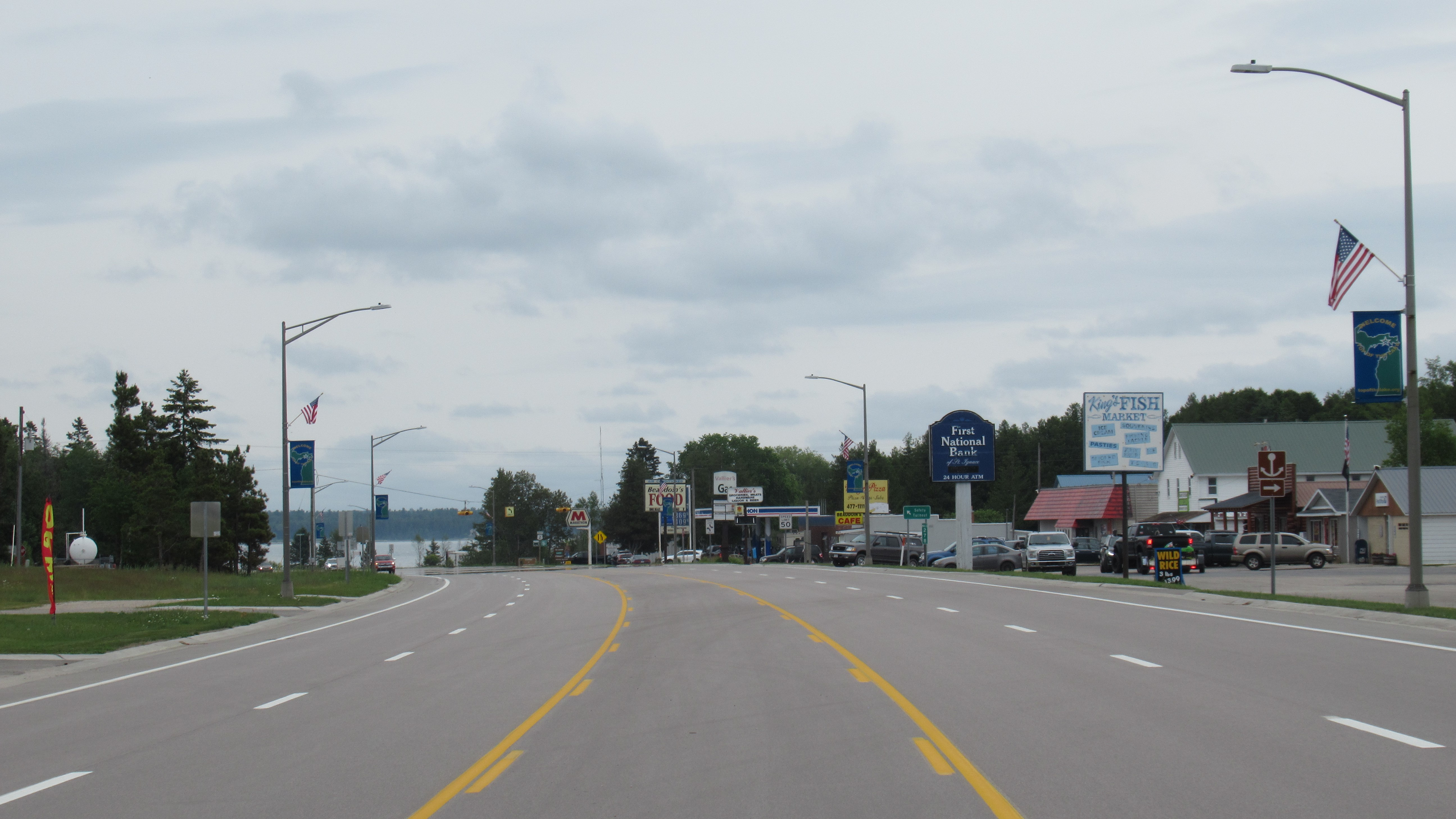
- Looking east along U.S. Route 2

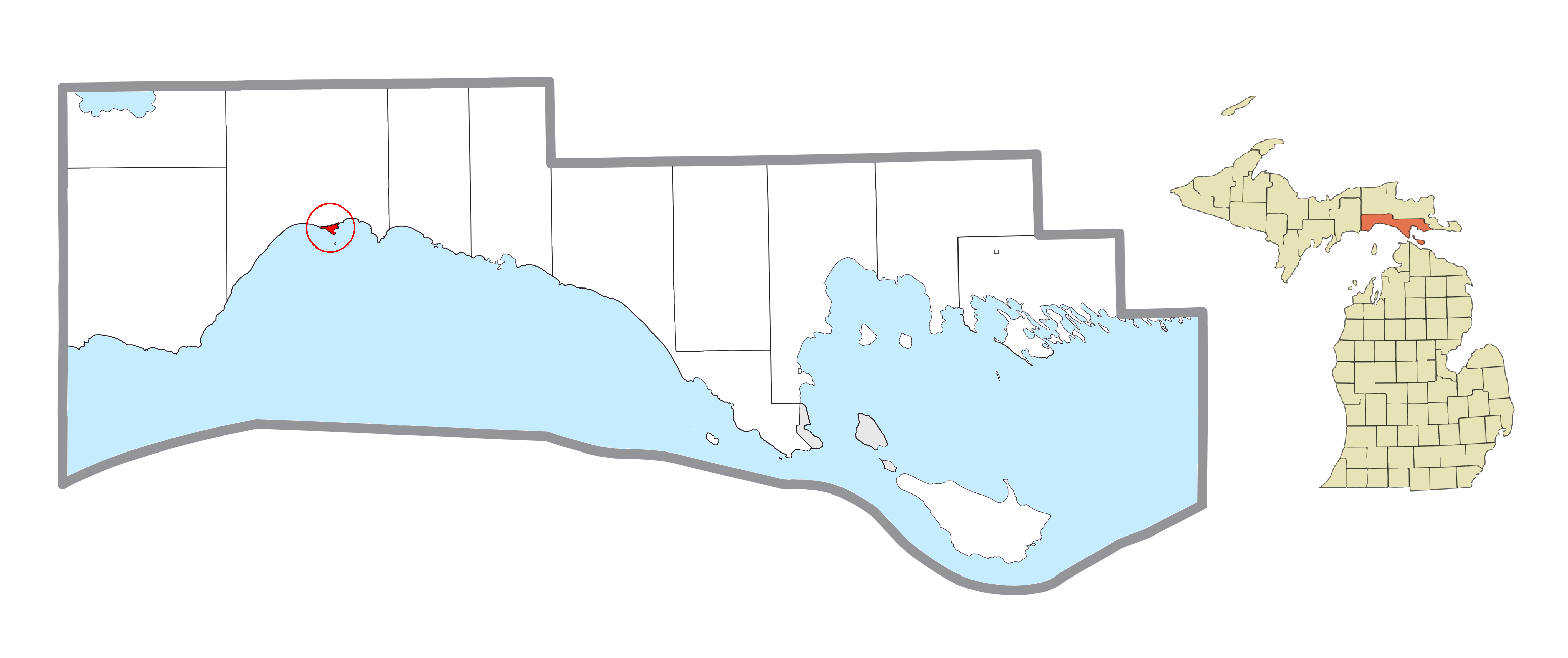
- Location within Mackinac County

- Location within the state of Michigan Location within the United States
- Coordinates: 46°05′27″N 85°27′03″W
- Country: United States
- State: Michigan
- County: Mackinac
- Township: Garfield
- Settled: 1843
- Established: 1873

Area
  - Total: 0.47 sq mi (1.22 km^{2})
  - Land: 0.41 sq mi (1.07 km^{2})
  - Water: 0.058 sq mi (0.15 km^{2})
- Elevation: 594 ft (181 m)

Population (2020)
  - Total: 147
  - Density: 358.54/sq mi (138.43/km^{2})
- Time zone: UTC-5 (Eastern (EST))
  - Summer (DST): UTC-4 (EDT)
- ZIP code(s): 49762
- Area code: 906
- GNIS feature ID: 2806342
- FIPS code: 26-56760

Naubinway (/ˈnɔːbɪnweɪ/ NAW-bin-way) is an unincorporated community and census-designated place (CDP) in Mackinac County in the U.S. state of Michigan. The population of the CDP was 147 at the 2020 census, which was the first year that it was recorded by the census. The community is located within Garfield Township.

As an unincorporated community, Naubinway has no legal autonomy of its own but does have its own post office with the 49762 ZIP Code. Naubinway is located along U.S. Route 2 and is the northernmost community on the shores on Lake Michigan. It is also the largest commercial fishing port in the state's Upper Peninsula.

== History ==
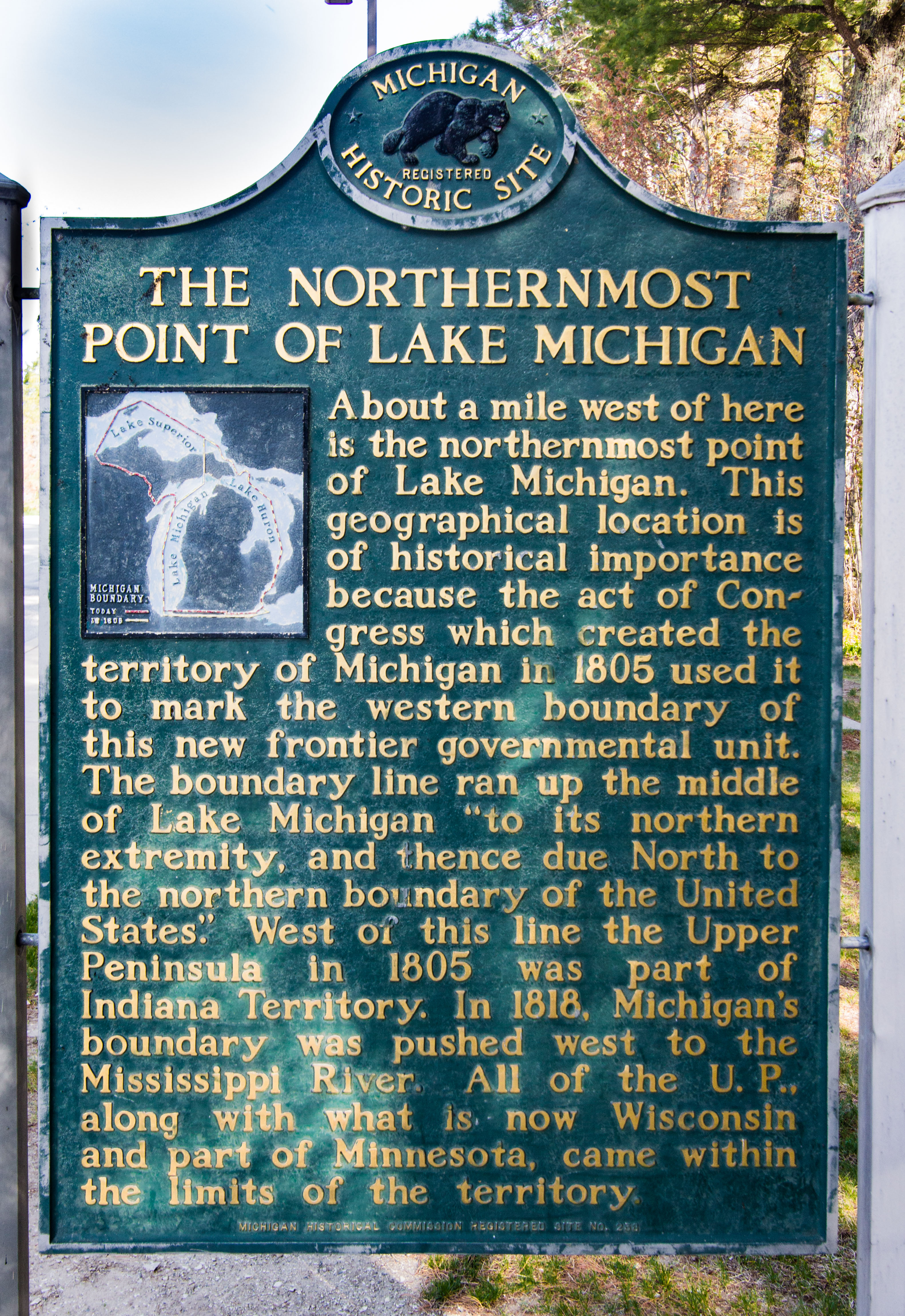
Historic marker in Naubinway

The first European traveler to settle in the area was William Boucha (or Boucher), who partook in the fur trade from Mackinac Island and moved west in 1843. He and his family built their home near Millecoquins Point. They stayed in the area until around 1857. Later in 1873, Boucha received a federal deed under President Ulysses S. Grant to occupy 27.3 acres (11.0 ha) of land at a very inexpensive cost. The new community was settled as "Bouchaville" but soon renamed as Naubinway. The name Naubinway came from the Ojibwe language (Anishinaabemowen) word “Inaabinawe”(root “inaabi”): “sits and keeps watch for something” or “to look or gaze in wonderment” although local tourist sites often translate the meaning as "place of echoes".

A post office was first established in Naubinway on November 28, 1879, with Benjamin Perkins serving as the first postmaster. The post office has continuously remained in operation and is currently located at West 11631 US Highway 2 in the center of the community. The Naubinway Cemetery (also referred to as the Garfield Township Cemetery) is located just north of the community. The active cemetery contains graves dating back to 1881.

Naubinway began as a lumbering community at the beginning of the lumber boom in the Upper Peninsula by 1880. The history of the nearby community of Engadine had a similar origin, and the two communities grew rapidly and became centers of large lumbering companies. The population of Naubinway and the surrounding area was estimated as high as 10,000 residents during the decade. The Canadian Pacific Railway built a line through the area in 1889. The railway line passed to the north of Naubinway through Engadine, and both communities benefited greatly from the railroad and the exportation of its lumber. Naubinway also benefited from being a port community on Lake Michigan. In addition to the growing lumber industry, the community also had a large commercial fishing industry. When the lumber industry declined after the turn of the century, the fishing industry continued.

The community received a railroad depot just to the north of the community. The depot was referred to as the Naubinway Junction, although its exact location and dates of operation are unknown. The line was served by the Minneapolis, St. Paul and Sault Ste. Marie Railroad and connected many of the Upper Peninsula's lumber communities. The railway line remains active and is operated by the Canadian National Railway but no longer contains a stop or railway station within Naubinway. Beginning in the 1940s, U.S. Route 2 was constructed and rerouted to pass directly through the community of Naubinway along Lake Michigan. U.S. Route 2 provided a major transportation route through the area.

As Naubinway is at the northernmost stretches of Lake Michigan, the point was designated as a Michigan State Historic Site named "the Northernmost Point of Lake Michigan" on April 14, 1964. This point was used to draw the westernmost boundary of the Michigan Territory when it was created in 1805. West of this point belonged to the Indiana Territory until the Michigan Territory expanded westward in 1818.

In recent years, due to the community's remoteness and lack of amenities, the area's population has steadily declined. The community is supported primarily by commercial fishing and tourism. For the 2020 census, Naubinway was included as a newly-listed census-designated place, which is included for statistical purposes only. Naubinway continues to remain an unincorporated community with no legal autonomy of its own.

== Geography ==
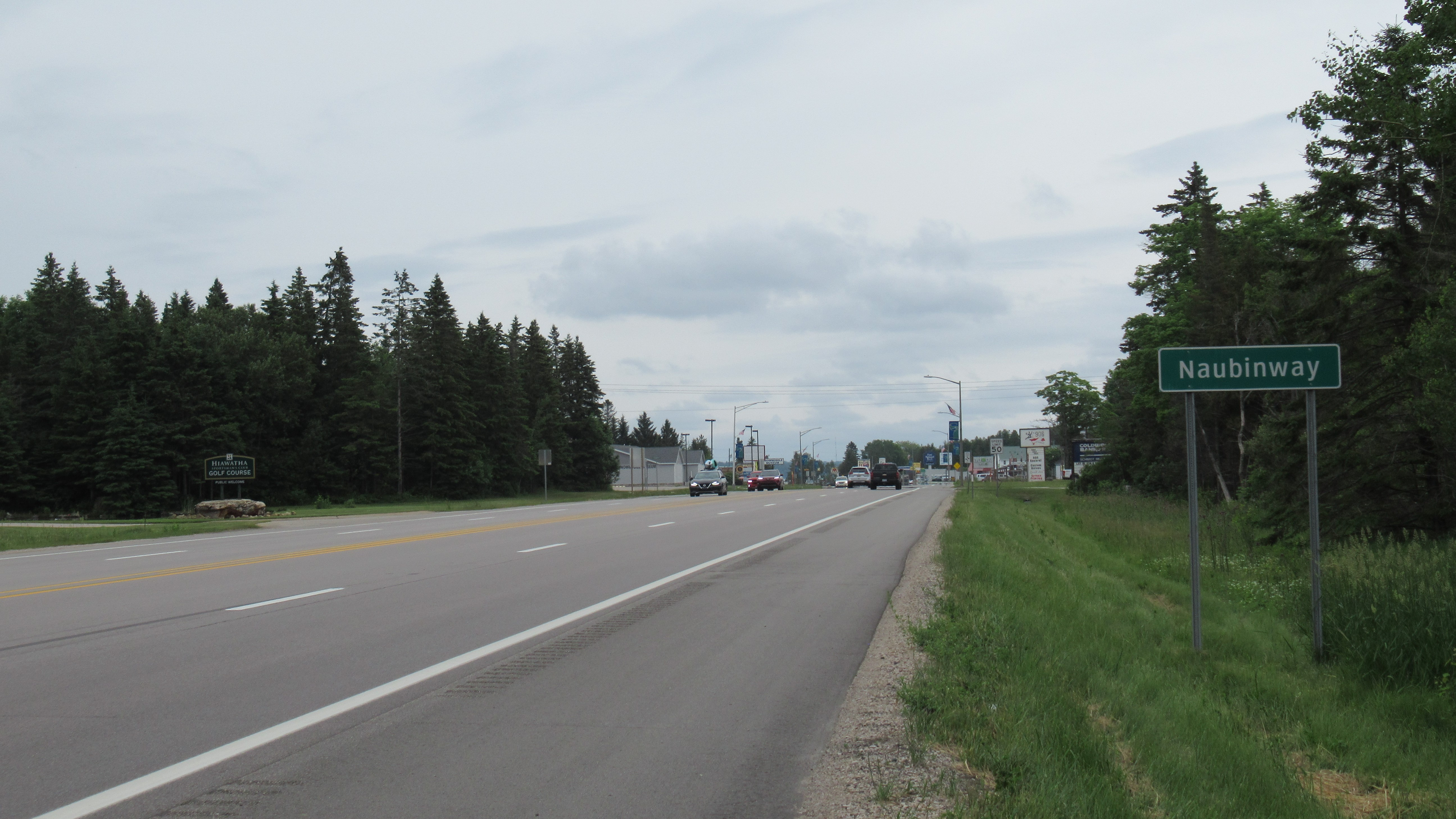
Naubinway road signage looking east along U.S. Route 2

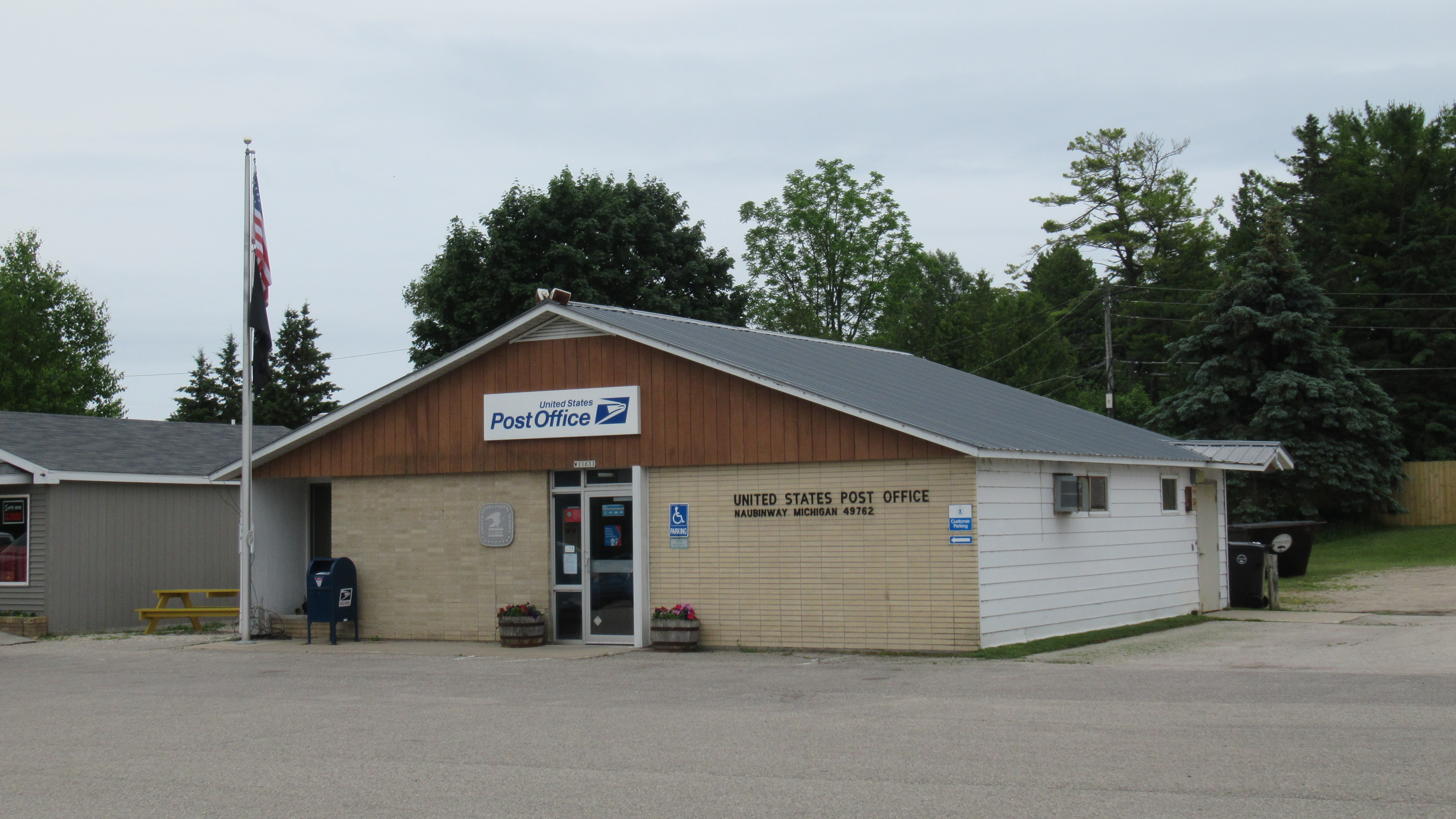
U.S. post office in Naubinway

Naubinway is located along the northernmost shores of Lake Michigan within Garfield Township in the state's Upper Peninsula. The community is centered along U.S. Route 2 (Lake Michigan Scenic Highway) about 41 miles (66 km) west of St. Ignace and 45 miles (72 km) east of Manistique. Hiawatha Trail (County Highway 40) is located just north of the center of Naubinway, and M-117 is to the west. Portions of the surrounding area are part of Lake Superior State Forest. The community sits at an elevation of 932 feet (284 m) above sea level.

According to the U.S. Census Bureau, the Naubinway CDP has a total area of 0.47 square miles (1.22 km^{2}), of which 0.06 square miles (0.16 km^{2}), or 12.34%, are water. U.S. Route 2 forms the northern edge of the community.

Smaller communities nearby include Engadine and Millecoquins to the northwest, Gould City to the west, Garnet to the northeast, and Epoufette to the east. Waterways near Naubinway include the Lower Millecoquins River a mile to the west and the east and west branches of Mile Creek the same distance to the east, which all drain into Lake Michigan. The southernmost point of land in the community is called Millecoquins Point. This cape creates a small natural harbor known as Naubinway Harbor, which contains a park and marina called the Naubinway–Garfield Township Marina. The Michigan Department of Natural Resources maintains a public boating access site in Naubinway on Lake Michigan.

Naubinway and the surrounding area is served by Engadine Consolidated Schools. Naubinway contains its own post office that uses the 49762 ZIP Code. The post office serves the southern portion of Garfield Township and a much larger area to the east of Naubinway, including most of Hudson Township, all of Hendricks Township, and a small western portion of Moran Township. The Garlyn Zoo, located to the east in Hudson Township, also uses the Naubinway ZIP Code.

Naubinway Island is a small island located about 0.63 miles (1.01 km) south of the community in Lake Michigan. The Naubinway Island Light was first constructed in 1931 on the island. The original structure has been replaced with a cylindrical tower and continues as an active lighthouse. The lighthouse was necessary to alert vessels of the shallow underwater Naubinway Reef, which can pose a hazard for vessels heading in and out of Naubinway Harbor. The rocky reef is located about 1.4 miles (2.3 km) south of the island and creates very shallow waters of only 4 feet (1.2 m) deep.

== Demographics ==
At the 2020 census, the population of the CDP of Naubinway was 147.

Historical population
Census	Pop.	Note	%±
2020	147		—
U.S. Decennial Census
