= Engadine, Michigan =

- Unincorporated community
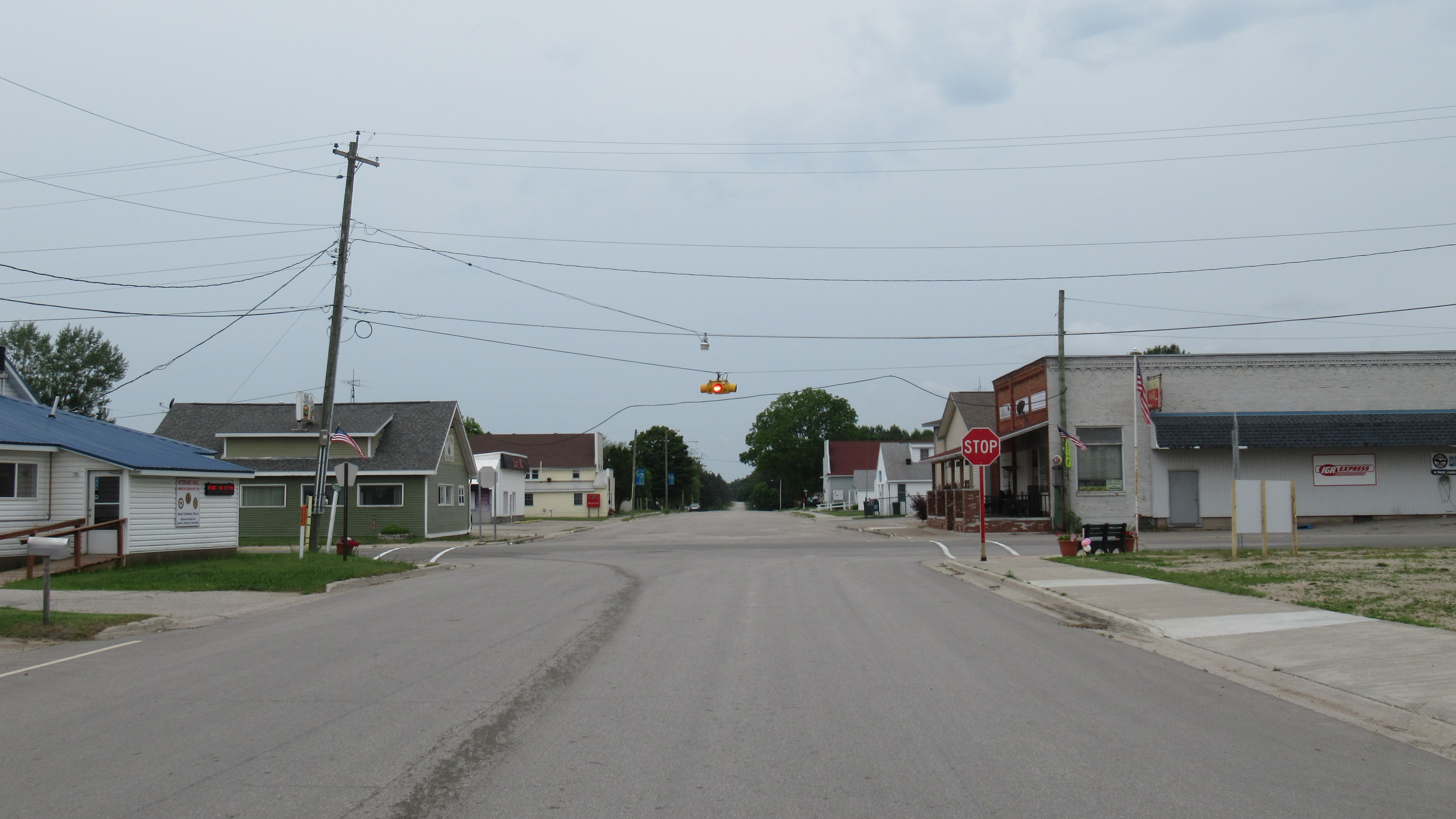
- Melville Street (H-40) looking west toward M-117

- Location within the state of Michigan Location within the United States
- Coordinates: 46°07′00″N 85°34′15″W
- Country: United States
- State: Michigan
- County: Mackinac
- Township: Garfield
- Settled: 1889
- Established: 1894
- Elevation: 673 ft (205 m)
- Time zone: UTC-5 (Eastern (EST))
  - Summer (DST): UTC-4 (EDT)
- ZIP code(s): 49827
- Area code: 906
- GNIS feature ID: 625593

Engadine (/ˈɛnɡədaɪn/ EN-gə-dyne) is an unincorporated community in Mackinac County in the U.S. state of Michigan. The community is located within Garfield Township. As an unincorporated community, Engadine has no legally defined boundaries or population statistics of its own but does have its own post office with the 49827 ZIP Code.

== History ==
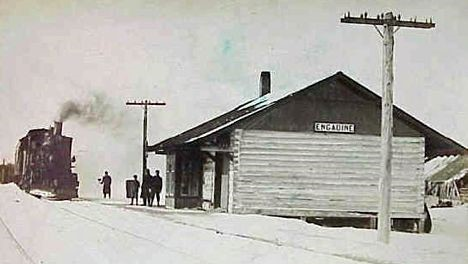
Historic image of the former Engadine train station

The history of Engadine is similar to that of the nearby community of Naubinway to the southeast. The first European settler to the area was William Boucha and his family, who moved to the Naubinway area in 1843. Naubinway and Engadine began as lumbering communities at the beginning of the lumber boom in the Upper Peninsula by 1880. The two communities grew rapidly and became centers of large lumbering companies.

The new community was officially named Kennedy when its post office opened on August 23, 1889. It was also referred to as Kennedy Siding. The Canadian Pacific Railway built a line through the area as early as 1888, and the new community centered along the railway. The community received a train depot, which connected it to many of the Upper Peninsula's lumber communities. Early settler and lumberman Sam Peterson soon moved to the area and suggested changing the name from Kennedy to Engadine, as he formerly resided in the Engadine valley in Switzerland. The community and post office officially changed names to Engadine on December 2, 1893. Since being established in 1889, the post office has remained in operation and is currently located at 104 Melville Street.

In addition to the railway, lumber was also hauled to Naubinway to be shipped across the Great Lakes. The railway was served by the Minneapolis, St. Paul and Sault Ste. Marie Railroad. The railway line remains active and is operated by Canadian National Railway but no longer contains a stop or railway station within Engadine. Beginning in the 1940s, U.S. Route 2 was constructed and rerouted to pass just to the south of Engadine. Around the same time, M-117 was commissioned as a short connector route from U.S. Route 2 north to M-28 near Newberry. Engadine is the only community located along M-117. The Engadine Cemetery (also referred to as the Garfield Cemetery) is located just north of the community center. The active cemetery contains graves dating back to 1911.

The Hiawatha Sporting Club was founded in Engadine in 1927 by famed doctor William McNamara, who purchased 54.5 square miles (141.2 km^{2}) of land for the purposes of fishing, hunting, and preserving the environment after the lumber industry came to an end. It was established as the largest and one of the most elite private clubs in Michigan. It consisted of several miles of Lake Michigan shoreline and numerous lakes stretching from Engadine through Naubinway. In 1931, the club purchased an empty Engadine store and moved it onto the club property to serve as a commissary. This building, designated as the Hiawatha Sportsman's Club 1931 Maintenance Building and Commissary, was listed on the National Register of Historic Places in 2011 and currently serves as a recreational building. It remains an active private club with its headquarters in Engadine.

== Geography ==
Engadine is located within Garfield Township in the state's Upper Peninsula about 40 miles (64.4 km) east of the city of Manistique. The community is centered along the southern stretch of M-117 and Melville Street. Melville Street carries the designation of County Highway 40 (H-40) east of M-117. H-40 runs east for 52.6 miles (84.7 km) to M-48 in Chippewa County. Shortly after exiting the community to the east and west, Melville Street changes names to Hiawatha Trail. Portions of the surrounding area are part of Lake Superior State Forest. The community is located about 5 miles (8.0 km) north of Lake Michigan and sits at an elevation of 673 feet (205 m) above sea level.

Located about 20 miles (32.2 km) to the north, the village of Newberry is the nearest sizable community. Other smaller communities nearby include Curtis and Millecoquins to the northwest, Gould City to the southwest, and Naubinway to the southeast.

Engadine contains its own post office that uses the 49827 ZIP Code. The post office serves a much larger area that includes most of Garfield Township, as well as a small portion of northeastern Newton Township and eastern portions of Portage Township. The Garfield Township Municipal Building is located within the center of Engadine at 6760 M-117.

== Education ==
Engadine lends its name to its own school district, Engadine Consolidated Schools. The district consists of a single campus located at 13920 Melville Street just east of M-117 within the community. The district includes preK–12 education and had an enrollment of 344 students in the 2019–20 school year.

Engadine Consolidated Schools serves a very large area of 445.9 square miles (1,154.9 km^{2}), which ranks it among the top 10 largest state districts by area. It is the largest district in Mackinac County and serves the majority of the western half of the county, including all of Garfield Township, Hendricks Township, Newton Township, and a small eastern portion of Portage Township.

== Images ==
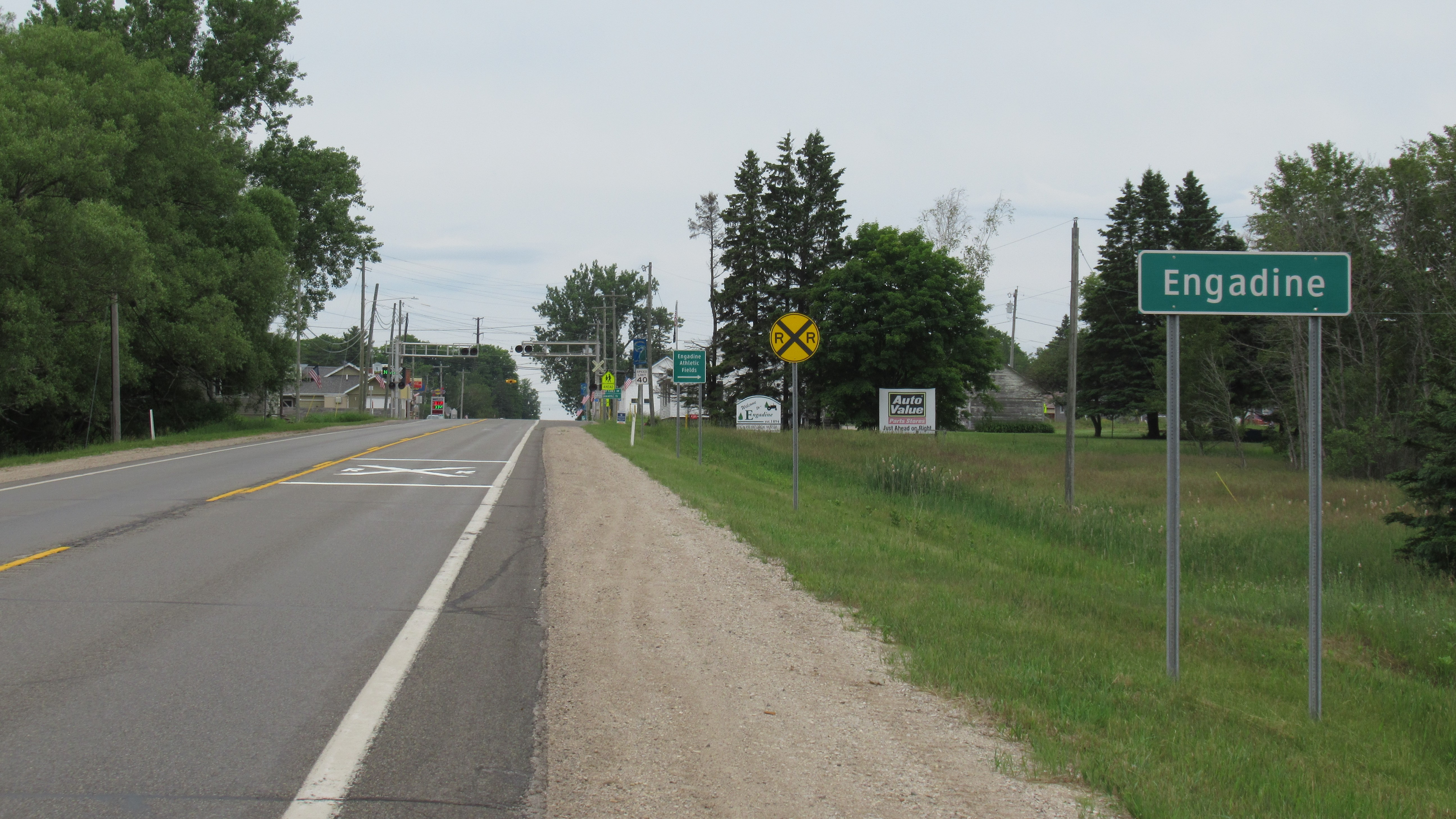
Road signage looking north along M-117

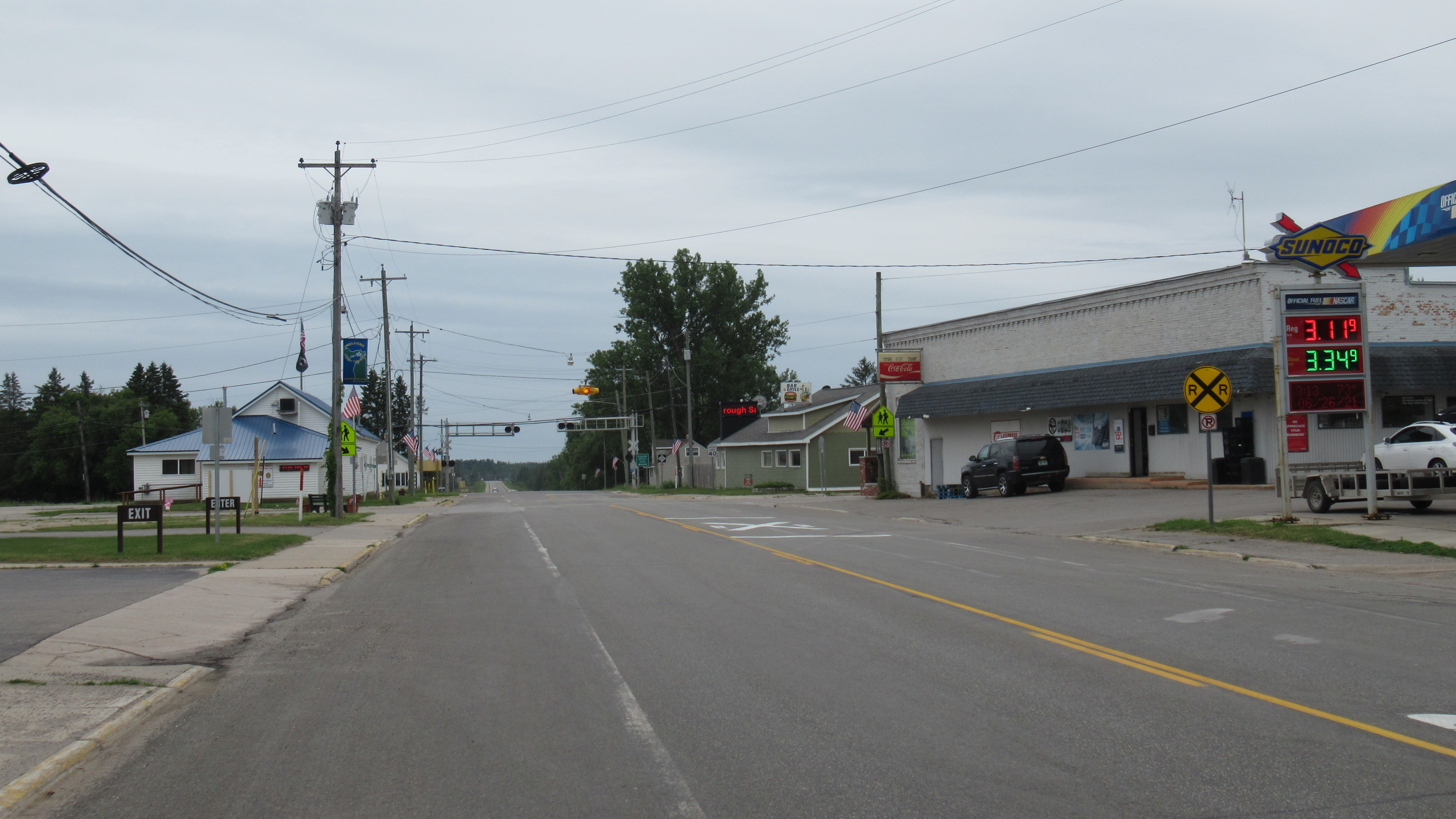
Looking south along M-117

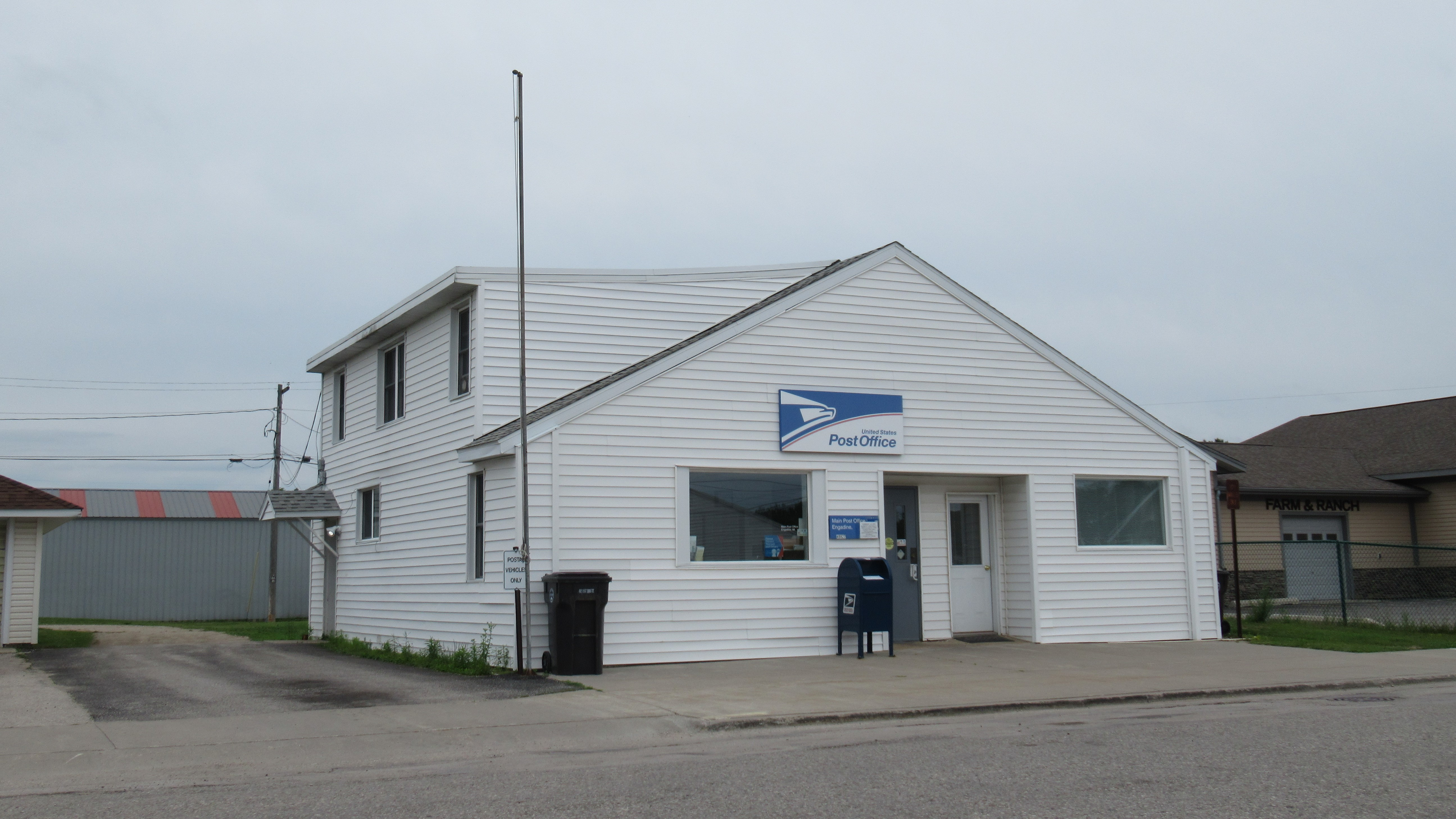
U.S. Post Office in Engadine

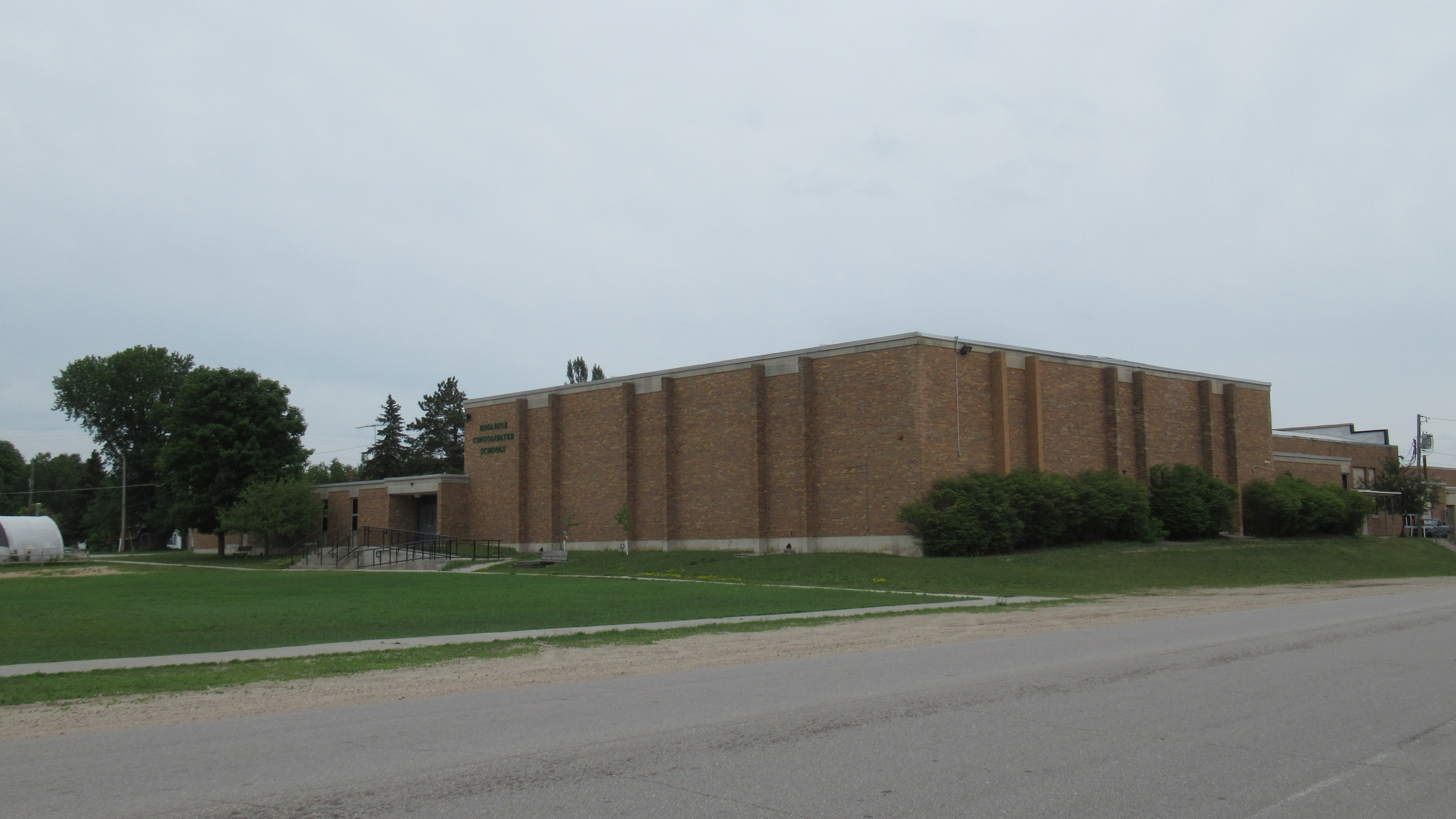
Engadine Consolidated Schools
