= M-117 (Michigan highway) =

State highway in Mackinac and Luce counties in Michigan, United States

M-117
- 117th Quartermaster Battalion Highway
- M-117 highlighted in red

Route information
- Maintained by MDOT
- Length: 14.479 mi (23.302 km)
- Existed: 1941–present

Major junctions
- South end: US 2 near Engadine
- H-40 in Engadine
- North end: M-28 near Newberry

Location
- Country: United States
- State: Michigan
- Counties: Mackinac, Luce

Highway system
- Michigan State Trunkline Highway System; Interstate; US; State; Byways
← M-116	→ M-118

M-117 is a 14.479-mile (23.302 km) state trunkline highway in the eastern Upper Peninsula (UP) of the US state of Michigan. The highway connects US Highway 2 (US 2) with M-28 west of Newberry. The designation has been used twice in the UP, once in 1941 for a former section of US 2 between Rexton and Epoufette, and the second in 1949 for the current corridor. The second version included a section that ran north of Newberry along what is now M-123, but it was truncated to its current routing in the 1960s. Since 1993, the trunkline has been dedicated to the 117th Quartermaster Battalion, a former National Guard unit from Kingsford.

== Route description ==
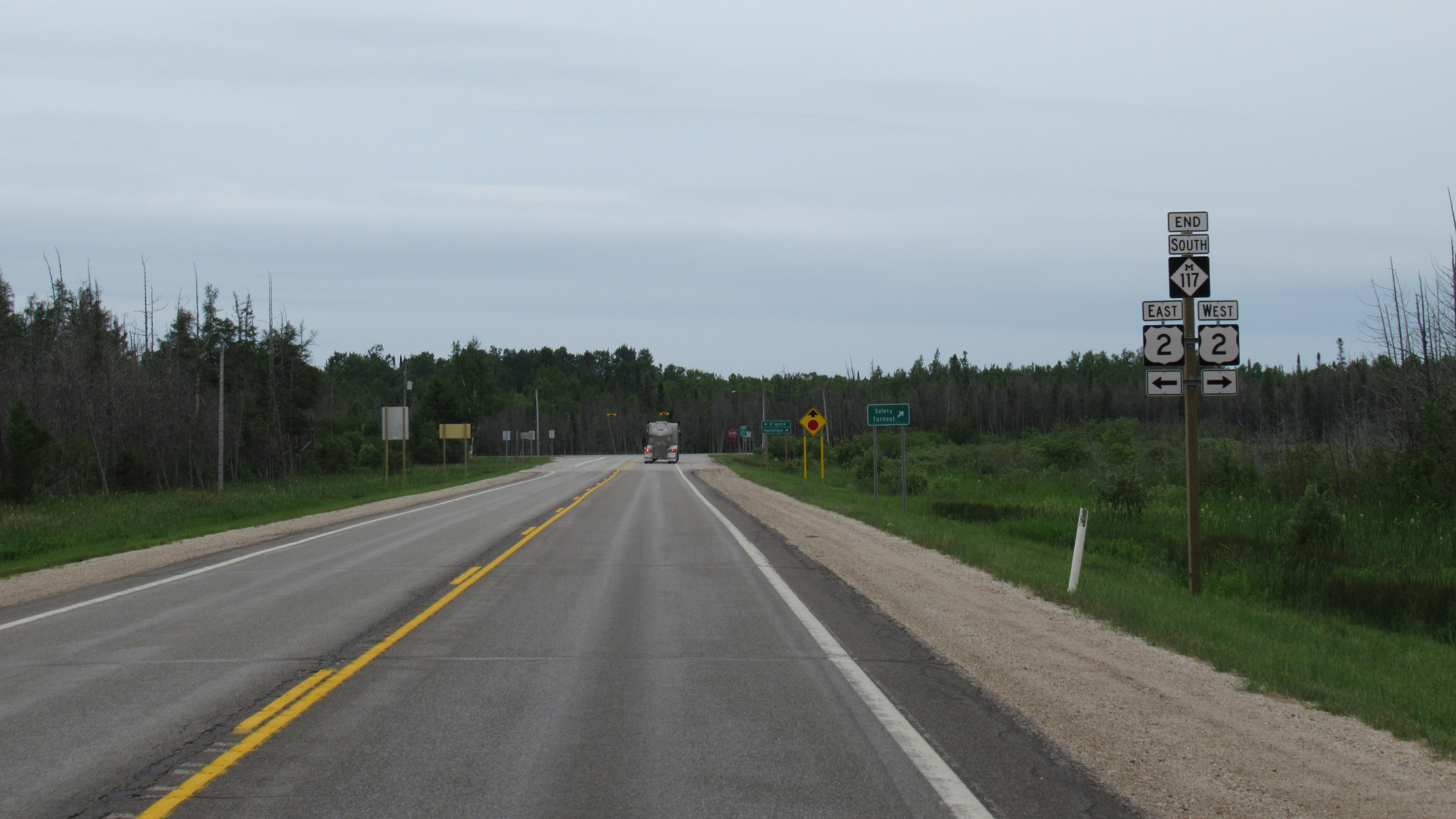
Southern terminus at US 2 in Garfield Township

The highway begins at US 2, one mile (1.6 km) south of Engadine and crosses the Canadian National Railway line before entering town. In Engadine, M-117 meets the western terminus of H-40 which runs on Hiawatha Trail. The trunkline passes a small pond in town and some farm fields north of Engadine. The terrain transitions to forest as the highway crosses into Luce County. The route angles slightly to the northeast to avoid Kaks Lake south of M-28 near Newberry. M-117 provides an important connection between two of the main highways in the UP. This connection is listed on the National Highway System, a network of roadways important to the country's economy, defense, and mobility. Of the ten state trunklines that connect M-28 and US 2, M-117 is one of three that do not overlap either. The others are US 45 and Interstate 75.

As part of the state's maintenance of M-117, the Michigan Department of Transportation (MDOT) tracks the volume of traffic that uses the roadway. These volumes are expressed using a metric called annual average daily traffic, which is a statistical calculation of the average daily number of vehicles on a segment of roadway. MDOT's surveys in 2010 showed that between 1,392 and 1,986 vehicles used the highway per day.

== History ==
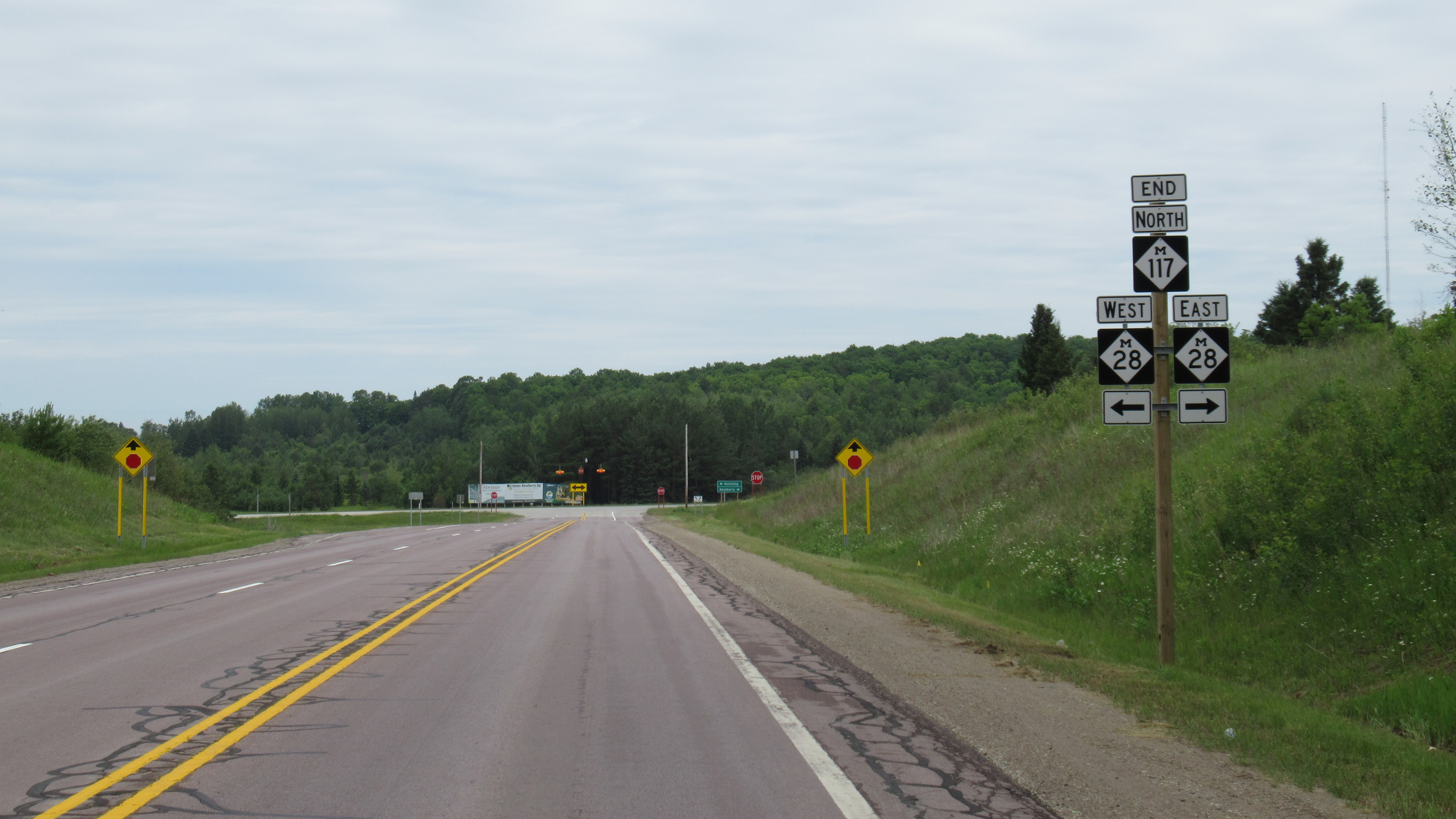
Northern terminus at M-28 in Pentland Township

US 2 was rerouted in 1941 between Gould City and Epoufette, with the previous routing between Epoufette and Rexton becoming a new M-117. The route of M-117 was replaced by a realigned M-48 in 1949. The M-117 designation was transferred to a new routing between Engadine and Newberry at that time, and extended east concurrent along M-28 and north through Newberry on Business M-28 (BUS M-28), replacing a section of M-48. North of town, M-117 extended past BUS M-28 to Four Mile Corner along the former M-48.

M-117 in Mackinac County was shifted to a new routing along Country Avenue in 1957. The previous routing was transferred to local control at the same time. M-117 was truncated to M-28 west of Newberry in late 1961 or early 1962. The section of highway north of M-28 through Newberry to Four Mile Corner was included in an extension of M-123 between Newberry and Paradise. M-117 was dedicated in 1993 to the deactivated 117th Quartermaster Battalion based out of Kingsford.

== Major intersections ==
County	Location	mi	km	Destinations	Notes
Mackinac	Garfield Township	0.000	0.000	US 2 / LMCT – Manistique, St. Ignace	
Mackinac	Engadine	1.025	1.650	H-40 east – Trout Lake	
Luce	Pentland Township	14.479	23.302	M-28 / LSCT – Munising, Newberry	
1.000 mi = 1.609 km; 1.000 km = 0.621 mi
