= Garfield Township, Mackinac County, Michigan =

Garfield Township, Michigan
- Civil township
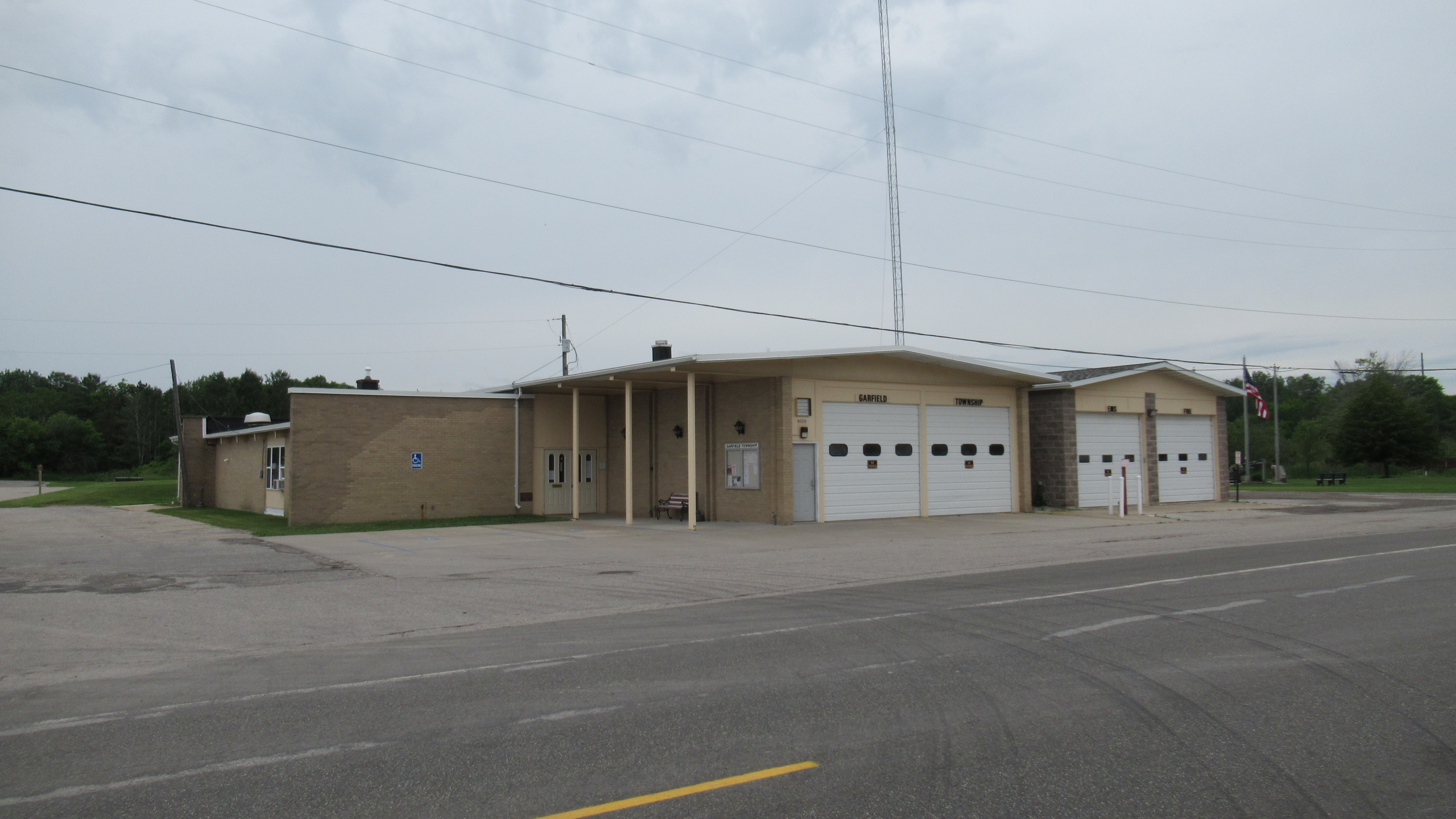
- Garfield Township Municipal Building

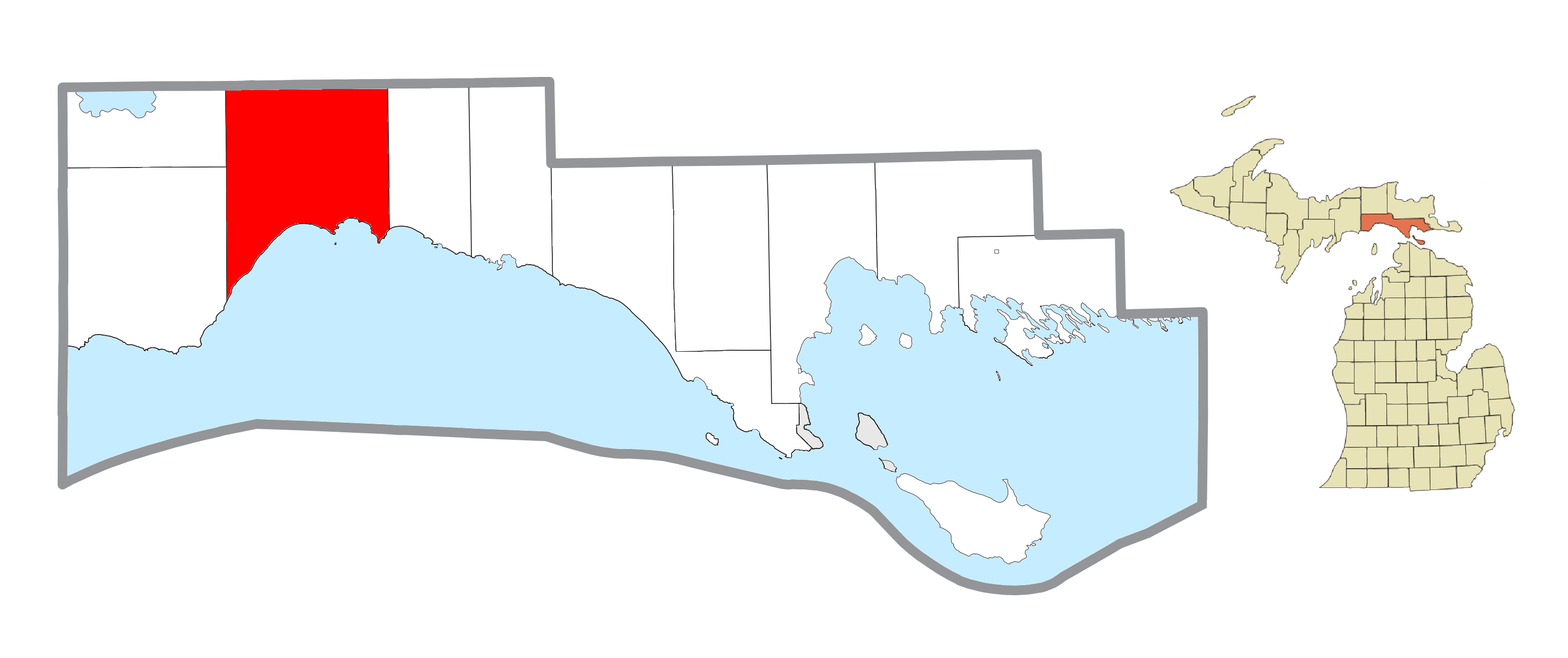
- Location within Mackinac County

- Location within the state of Michigan Location within the United States
- Coordinates: 46°08′40″N 85°30′23″W
- Country: United States
- State: Michigan
- County: Mackinac

Government
  - Supervisor: Donald Butkovitch
  - Clerk: Paula Fillman

Area
  - Total: 137.56 sq mi (356.28 km^{2})
  - Land: 134.52 sq mi (348.41 km^{2})
  - Water: 3.04 sq mi (7.87 km^{2})
- Elevation: 663 ft (202 m)

Population (2020)
  - Total: 1,166
  - Density: 8.52/sq mi (3.29/km^{2})
- Time zone: UTC-5 (Eastern (EST))
  - Summer (DST): UTC-4 (EDT)
- ZIP Codes: 49762 (Naubinway); 49827 (Engadine)
- Area code: 906
- FIPS code: 26-097-31620
- GNIS feature ID: 1626339
- Website: https://www.garfieldtwpmcmi.gov/

Garfield Township is a civil township of Mackinac County in the U.S. state of Michigan. The population was 1,146 at the 2010 census, and 1,166 in 2020.

== Geography ==
The township is in western Mackinac County. It is bordered by Portage Township and Newton Township to the west and Hudson Township to the east, all in Mackinac County, and by Pentland Township in Luce County to the north. The southern border of the township is the shore of Lake Michigan.

Garfield Township is the location of the northernmost point of Lake Michigan. The location, near Naubinway, was designated as a Michigan State Historic Site named "the Northernmost Point of Lake Michigan" on April 14, 1964. This point was used to draw the westernmost boundary of the Michigan Territory when it was created in 1805. West of this point belonged to the Indiana Territory until the Michigan Territory expanded westward in 1818.

According to the United States Census Bureau, Garfield Township has a total area of 137.56 square miles (356.28 km^{2}), of which 134.52 square miles (348.41 km^{2}) are land and 3.04 square miles (7.87 km^{2}) (2.26%) are water.

=== Communities ===
- Engadine is an unincorporated community at 46°07′00″N 85°34′15″W along M-117 and H-40 (Melville Street), approximately one mile (1.6 km) north of U.S. Route 2. It began as a lumber settlement called "Kennedy Siding" and was given a post office in August 1889. In December 1893, the name changed to Engadine. The Engadine 49827 ZIP Code serves most of Garfield Township, as well portions of Portage Township and Newton Township.
- Gilchrist is an unincorporated community at 46°08′34″N 85°23′05″W on H-40 (Hiawatha Trail), approximately six miles (9.7 km) east of Millecoquins and 3.5 miles (5.6 km) west of Garnet. It was a lumber settlement with a station on the Minneapolis, St. Paul and Sault Ste. Marie Railroad. A post office operated from September 1879 to June 1883 and again from June 1888 until November 1906. It was named for John Gilchrist, a local landowner.
- Millecoquins is an unincorporated community at 46°08′07″N 85°30′27″W on H-40 (Hiawatha Trail), approximately three miles (4.8 km) east of Engadine and 9.5 miles (15.3 km) west of Garnet. It is on the southern end of Millecoquins Lake, which divides the upper and lower segments of the Millecoquins River. The name Millecoquins (pronounced "mel-a-coke-ins)" is a French word meaning "a thousand thieves", which was derived from the Indian terms Manana koking or Minakoking, meaning a place where the hardwood is plentiful.
- Naubinway is an unincorporated community and census-designated place at 46°05′33″N 85°26′51″W on U.S. Route 2 along the Lake Michigan shoreline. A post office was established in November 1879. The Naubinway 49762 ZIP code serves the southern portion of Garfield Township and a much larger area to the east, including most of Hudson Township, all of Hendricks Township, and a small western portion of Moran Township. The Garlyn Zoo, located to the east in Hudson Township, also uses the Naubinway ZIP Code. Naubinway Island lies a half mile south of the community.

== Transportation ==
=== Highways ===
- US 2 runs east–west along the southern edge of the township along the Lake Michigan coastline.
- H-40, known locally as Hiawatha Trail, runs east–west through the center of the township.

=== Bus service ===
- Indian Trails provides daily intercity bus service via Engadine between St. Ignace and Ironwood, Michigan.
