= Carmeuse Lime & Stone (railroad) =

Railroads in Michigan, United States

The Carmeuse company operates two shortline railroads carrying freight along the shoreline of Lake Huron and Lake Michigan in the U.S. state of Michigan. Carmeuse operates two major Michigan quarries, and uses a variety of transportation methods, including stub short lines, to carry crushed stone and aggregate to waterfront locations where the material can be placed on conveyor belts for water transportation.

== Description ==
On Michigan's Upper Peninsula, near Gould City in the northwest corner of Mackinac County, a significant quarry ships metallurgical limestone southward to Port Inland, Michigan. A 15-mile-long (24 km.) short line railroad, located in Mackinac County and in adjacent Schoolcraft County, moves the Carmeuse calcium stone to waiting lake freighters for transport to steel mills, where the material serves an essential role in the smelting process. The Port Inland line has a junction with Canadian National, and small quantities of limestone are re-shipped by rail. As of late 2021, Carmeuse planned to expand operations at Gould City.

Also in the Upper Peninsula, in Clark Township, near the unincorporated community of Cedarville, a rich layer of dolomite, part of the Niagara Escarpment, is mined by Carmeuse. The resulting aggregate is carried approximately 5 miles (8 km.) south by a dedicated rail line to Port Dolomite for loading and water transport. As with Port Inland, the Port Dolomite operations use lake freighters for most of the tonnage/mile transport needs of the product. The Port Dolomite line is a stub operation that does not connect to the national network, so there is no bulk shipment for long distances by rail.

Neither Carmeuse operation has ever carried passengers in revenue service, nor are they licensed to serve as common carriers in freight revenue service.
