= Upper Millecoquins River =

Location
- Country: United States

Physical characteristics
- Source
  - location: Michigan
- Mouth
  - location: 46°09′56″N 85°31′07″W

The Upper Millecoquins River is a 7.6-mile-long (12.2 km) river on the Upper Peninsula of Michigan in the United States. It begins at the outlet of Millecoquins Pond in northern Mackinac County and flows generally south to Millecoquins Lake. The outlet of Millecoquins Lake is the Lower Millecoquins River which flows to Lake Michigan.

== See also ==
- List of rivers of Michigan
