= Mueller Township, Michigan =

- Civil township
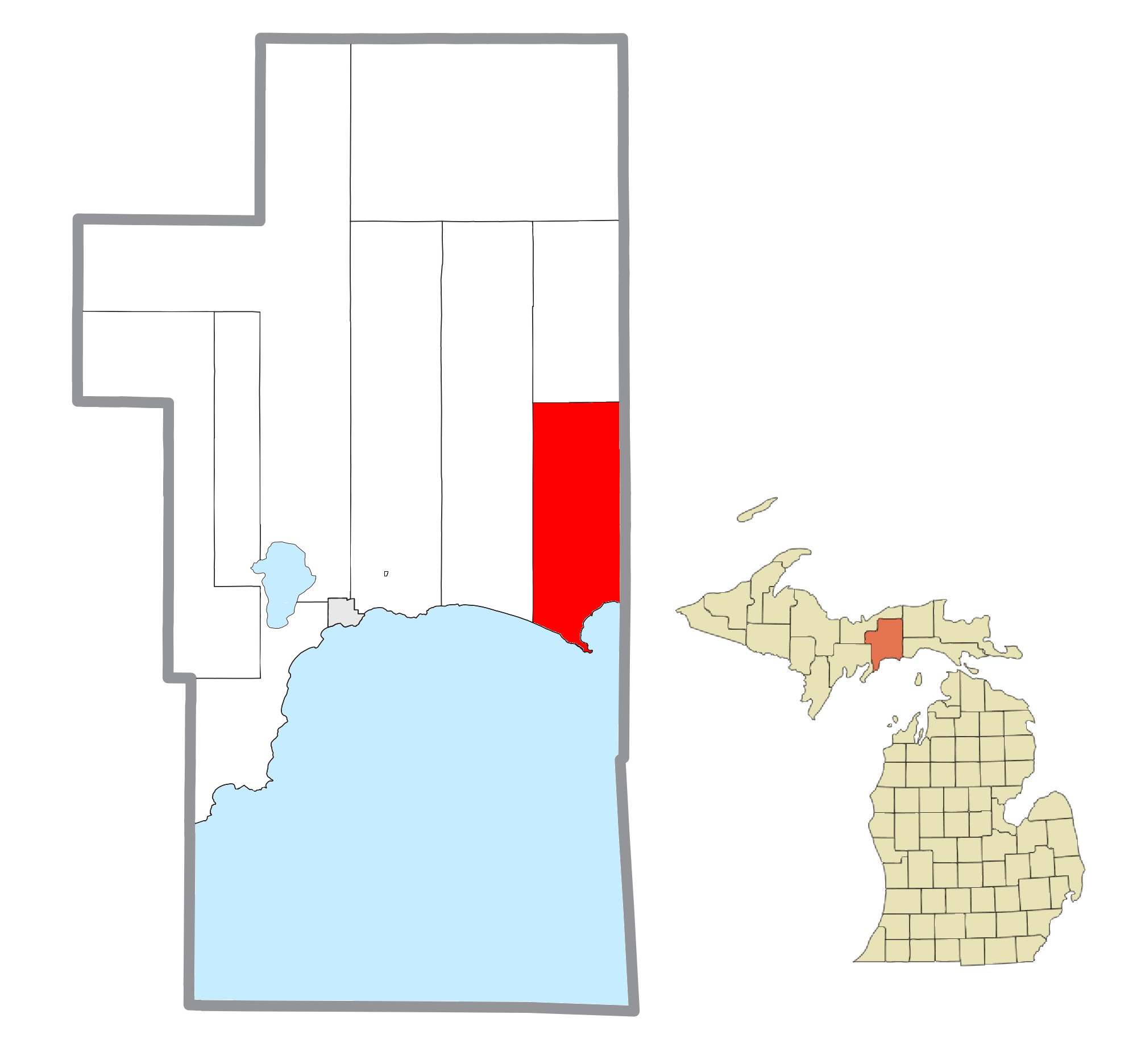
- Location within Schoolcraft County

- Location within the state of Michigan Mueller Township (the United States)
- Coordinates: 46°03′31″N 85°55′14″W
- Country: United States
- State: Michigan
- County: Schoolcraft

Government
  - Supervisor: Jerry Glasscock
  - Clerk: Mary Lee

Area
  - Total: 87.78 sq mi (227.3 km^{2})
  - Land: 83.61 sq mi (216.5 km^{2})
  - Water: 4.17 sq mi (10.8 km^{2})
- Elevation: 702 ft (214 m)

Population (2020)
  - Total: 260
  - Density: 3.1/sq mi (1.2/km^{2})
- Time zone: UTC-5 (Eastern (EST))
  - Summer (DST): UTC-4 (EDT)
- ZIP code(s): 49836 (Germfask); 49840 (Gulliver); 49854 (Manistique)
- Area code: 906
- FIPS code: 26-56060
- GNIS feature ID: 1626777
- Website: https://muellertownship.com/

Mueller Township is a civil township of Schoolcraft County in the U.S. state of Michigan. The population was 260 in 2020.

== Geography ==
According to the United States Census Bureau, the township has a total area of 87.78 square miles (227.35 km^{2}), of which 83.61 square miles (216.55 km^{2}) is land and 4.17 square miles (10.80 km^{2}) (4.75%) is water.

=== Communities ===
- Blaney Park was established as a lumbering town by the William Mueller Company, a Chicago-based company that operated steam ships on the great lakes. It was not a successful operation so the town was sold in 1909 to the Wiscon Land and Mining Company, which continued lumbering operations until 1927. It was then converted into a resort town.
- Port Inland is a commercial port in the eastern end of the township at 45°58′15″N 85°52′20″W It transships the limestone carried to it by Carmeuse, a quarry company. In 2013, it was the 81st largest port in the United States ranked by tonnage.

== Demographics ==
As of the 2000 census, there were 245 people, 102 households, and 84 families residing in the township. The population density was 2.9 per square mile (1.1/km^{2}). There were 301 housing units at an average density of 3.6 per square mile (1.4/km^{2}). The racial makeup of the township was 88.98% White, 8.16% Native American, 1.63% from other races, and 1.22% from two or more races. Hispanic or Latinos of any race were 2.86% of the population. By 2020, its population grew to 260.

In 2000, there were 102 households, out of which 19.6% had children under the age of 18 living with them, 75.5% were married couples living together, 3.9% had a female householder with no husband present, and 17.6% were non-families. 14.7% of all households were made up of individuals, and 11.8% had someone living alone who was 65 years of age or older. The average household size was 2.40 and the average family size was 2.62. In the township the population was spread out, with 18.0% under the age of 18, 3.7% from 18 to 24, 21.2% from 25 to 44, 33.9% from 45 to 64, and 23.3% who were 65 years of age or older. The median age was 51 years. For every 100 females, there were 118.8 males. For every 100 females age 18 and over, there were 107.2 males.

In 2000, the median income for a household in the township was $33,571, and the median income for a family was $34,643. Males had a median income of $25,000 versus $21,250 for females. The per capita income for the township was $18,507. About 2.5% of families and 6.0% of the population were below the poverty line, including none of those under the age of eighteen and 10.8% of those 65 or over. As of 2021 census estimates, its median household income was $53,571.

== Transportation ==
Indian Trails provides daily intercity bus service via Blaney Park between St. Ignace and Ironwood, Michigan.
