= Lower Millecoquins River =

Location
- Country: United States

Physical characteristics
- Source
  - location: Michigan
- Mouth
  - location: 46°05′46″N 85°28′49″W

The Lower Millecoquins River is a 9.6-mile-long (15.4 km) river on the Upper Peninsula of Michigan in the United States. It begins at the outlet of Millecoquins Lake and flows in a winding course south to Lake Michigan. The principal inflow of Millecoquins Lake is the Upper Millecoquins River.

== See also ==
- List of rivers of Michigan
