= Carp River (Mackinac County) =

River in Michigan, United States

Location
- Country: United States

Physical characteristics
- Source
  - location: Trout Lake
- Mouth
  - location: Lake Huron
  - elevation: 581 ft (177 m)

National Wild and Scenic River
- Type: Wild, Scenic, Recreational
- Designated: March 3, 1992

Carp River is a 40.2-mile-long (64.7 km) river in Chippewa and Mackinac counties in the U.S. state of Michigan. 21.7 miles (34.9 km) of the river were added to the National Wild and Scenic Rivers System in 1992.

== Description ==
The Carp River is formed by the outflow of Trout Lake (also known as Carp Lake) in southern Trout Lake Township in Chippewa County at 46°10′41″N 85°01′55″W in the eastern Upper Peninsula. The river flows generally south and east into Mackinac County.

The Carp River flows for much of its length through the eastern region of the Hiawatha National Forest. A central portion of the river, near M-123, flows through the Mackinac Wilderness, jointly preserved by the U.S. Forest Service and the Great Lakes Indian Fish & Wildlife Commission of the Ojibwa Indians.

In contrast to much of the Upper Peninsula, the Carp River's watershed is relatively flat, and there are only a few small rapids on the river. It is often used by canoeists. Fishermen can find brook trout, brown trout, and rainbow trout in the river in summer, with some salmon in fall.

Close to its mouth, the Carp River is spanned by the Mackinac Trail – Carp River Bridge, a 1920 spandrel arch bridge that was listed on the National Register of Historic Places in December 1999. The river then empties into St. Martin Bay of Lake Huron at 46°01′29″N 84°41′33″W.

== Tributaries and features ==
From the mouth:

- Saint Martin Bay
- (left) Red Creek
- (left) Flat Creek
- (right) Platz Lake
- (right) Lower Farm Hill Creek
- (right) Upper Farm Hill Creek
- (right) Spring Lake Creek
  - Spring Lake
- (right) North Branch Carp River
  - (left) Taylor Creek
    - (left) Bissel Creek
  - (right) East Lake Branch Carp River
    - East Lake
- (left) South Branch Carp River
- Rock Rapids
- (right) Ozark Creek
  - (right) Mud Creek
- (left) Mud Lake
- (right) Frenchman Lake
  - Wegwaas Lake
- Trout Lake (also known as Big Trout Lake and Carp Lake)
  - Schwesinger Creek
  - Little Trout Lake
    - Kneebone Creek

== Drainage basin ==
The drainage basin of the Carp River includes all or part of the following:

- Chippewa County
  - Trout Lake Township
- Mackinac County
  - Brevort Township
  - Moran Township
  - St. Ignace Township
