= St. Ignace–Trout Lake Trail =

Bicycle and hiking trail

Coordinates: 45°52′29″N 84°44′6″W

The St. Ignace–Trout Lake Trail is a 26-mile (42 km) ORV, bicycle and hiking trail in Michigan that creates a non-highway right-of-way between the Straits of Mackinac and the interior of Michigan's Upper Peninsula. The trail uses a section of the former roadbed of the Duluth, South Shore and Atlantic Railway. Proceeding from south to north, the trail departs St. Ignace, at a point adjacent to the northern end of the Mackinac Bridge, and runs concurrently for the first five miles (8.0 km) of its route with the North Country Trail. The two trails then diverge and, continuing to follow the former railroad bed, the St. Ignace–Trout Lake Trail crosses Mackinac County from south to north and enters Chippewa County. At the trail's northern end, the unincorporated community of Trout Lake in Chippewa County, the trail's right-of-way resumes its active use as a railroad and the trail ends.

Points of interest along the trail, from south to north, include:

- St. Ignace
- Chain Lake
- Moran
- Fred Dye Nature Sanctuary
- Ozark
- Trout Lake
