= Gros Cap Archaeological District =

Archaeological site in Michigan, United States

- U.S. National Register of Historic Places
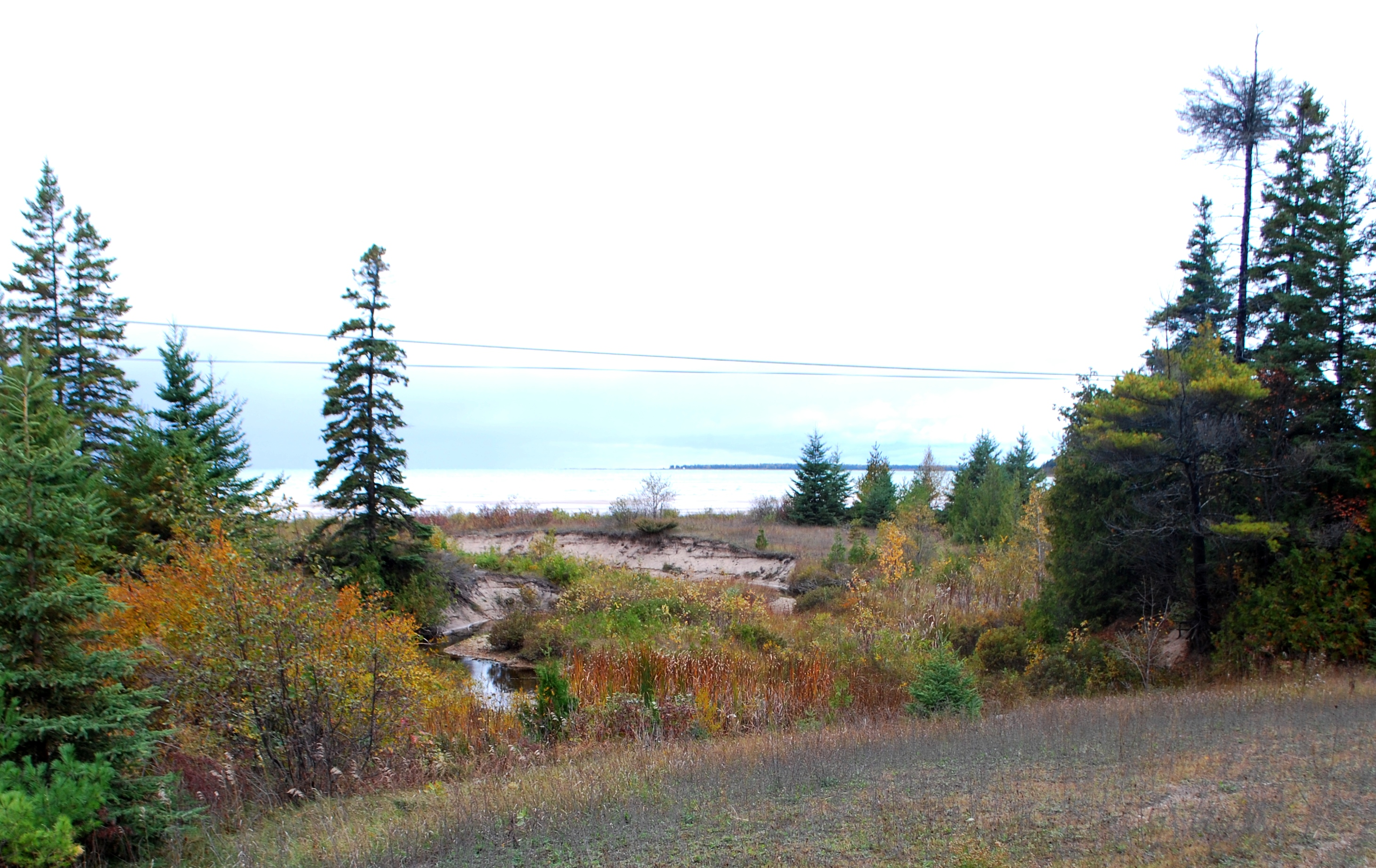
- Part of site at West Moran Bay and mouth of stream.

- Location within Michigan Location within the United States
- Location: West Moran Bay, Southeast of Gros Cap on US 2 (Note: The NRIS gives the location of the Gros Cap Archaeological District as "Address Restricted". However, multiple sources specify that the Odawa village was on West Moran Bay, and contiguous with the Gros Cap Cemetery. Geocoordinates given are approximate.)
- Nearest city: Gros Cap, Michigan
- Coordinates: 45°52′0″N 84°48′0″W
- Area: 13.5 acres (5.5 ha)
- NRHP reference No.: 82000540
- Added to NRHP: October 29, 1982

The Gros Cap Archaeological District is a set of three archaeological sites located in Moran Township, Michigan, US, designated 20MK6, 20MK7 and 20MK111. It was listed on the National Register of Historic Places in 1982. The three sites cover 13.5 acres (5.5 ha) and include a village site and portions of the Gros Cap Cemetery.

== History ==
The site is associated with the Odawa people, who settled in the area around West Moran Bay in the late 17th century. The Odawa village, located on the shore of the bay, had at one time 1500 people living in it, and was connected via a trail to the village to the east where St. Ignace is now located. A cemetery (now known as the Gros Cap Cemetery and still in use) was originally adjacent to the tribal village and was used as their burial ground. As more European settlers moved into the area, the Ottawa population decreased due to further emigration or intermarriage with the arriving settlers. However, the cemetery continued to be used by French, English and, eventually, American settlers.
