= Fred Dye Nature Sanctuary =

Nature sanctuary

- Location within Michigan
- Location: Upper Peninsula, Mackinac County, Michigan USA
- Nearest city: Ozark, Michigan
- Coordinates: 46.0986°N 84.9312°W
- Area: 36 acres (15 ha)
- Established: 1970
- Governing body: Michigan Nature Assoc. (non-profit)

Fred Dye Nature Sanctuary, commonly referred to as Fred Dye, is a 36-acre (15 ha) nature sanctuary located in Mackinac County, Michigan. It is maintained and preserved by the non-profit organization Michigan Nature Association. Originally created as the Purple Coneflower Plant Preserve in 1970, the site protects a disjunct tallgrass prairie in the Upper Peninsula of Michigan. With the help of an anonymous donor, the site was enlarged and renamed in 2003 and dedicated (or rededicated) in 2004.

Geologically, the site consists of dolomitic karstland, with hard rock close to the earth's surface and little opportunity for trees to grow deep roots. A prairie opening has taken this parcel for its own, with grasses, wildflowers such as the purple coneflower for which the Sanctuary was once named, butterflies such as the monarch, and small birds such as the ruby-throated hummingbird.

The Sanctuary land parcel lies along the historic roadbed of the Duluth, South Shore and Atlantic Railway (DSS&A), an active railway during the Upper Peninsula's lumbering era. Developers platted a townsite on this spot, and entrepreneurs built a saloon and a general store. The site is now the ghost town of Kenneth, Michigan; the foundations of these buildings form part of the sanctuary.

The roadbed of the DSS&A has been torn up and its right-of-way repurposed as part of the St. Ignace–Trout Lake Trail. An active State highway, M-123, runs adjacent to the Fred Dye Preserve and serves the site.
