= Chain Lake (Michigan) =

Lake in Mackinac County, Michigan, U.S.

- Location within Michigan Location within the United States
- Location: Mackinac County, Michigan
- Coordinates: 45°52′41″N 84°45′25″W
- Type: Lake
- Primary outflows: Moran River
- Basin countries: United States
- Surface elevation: 600 ft (180 m)

Chain Lake is a large pond or small lake in Mackinac County near St. Ignace in the U.S. state of Michigan at an elevation of 600 feet (180 m). The lake is served by Interstate 75, which provides a rest area and lake overlook for southbound drivers at mile 346. The lake is also served by the North Country Trail, running in concurrence with the St. Ignace-Trout Lake Trail. This trail uses the right-of-way abandoned by a spur line of the Duluth, South Shore and Atlantic Railway, a logging-era railroad that helped remove most of the old-growth timber from around the lake. Second-growth woodland surrounding the small sheet of water is owned by the private sector and by Hiawatha National Forest.

The lake is noted for rock bass, bullhead, sunfish, sucker, largemouth bass, perch, and northern pike. In winter seasons with suitable weather conditions it can be used to play pond hockey. It may be named for being part of a "chain" of streams and lakes that offered alternative canoe passage from St. Ignace westward. Although the eastern tip of the lake is less than 1 mile from Lake Huron, it drains down the Moran River and through Freschette Lake into West Moran Bay in Lake Michigan.
