= Gros Cap Cemetery =

Historic cemetery in Mackinac County, Michigan

- U.S. National Register of Historic Places
- Michigan State Historic Site
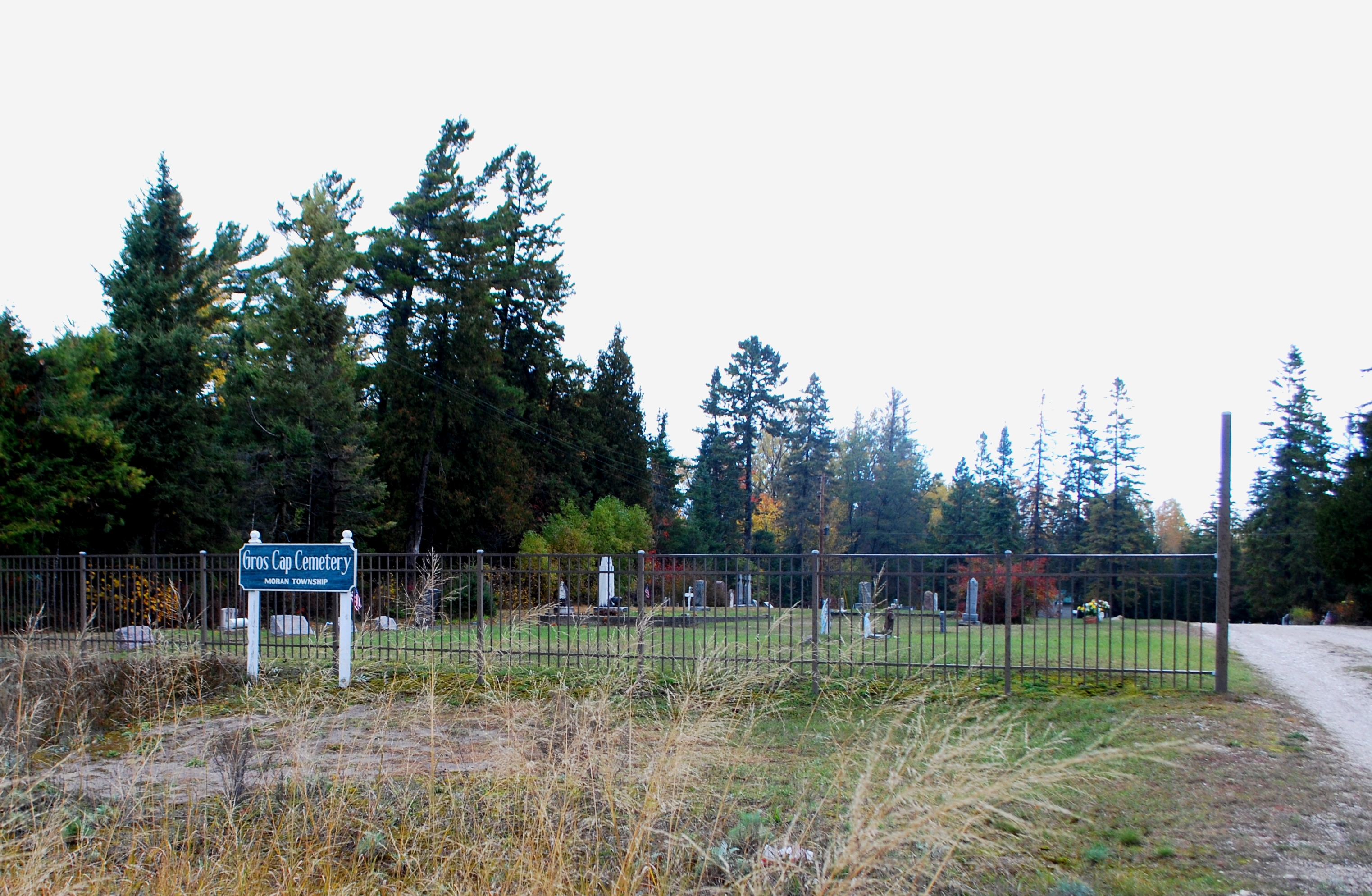

- Location within Michigan Location within the United States
- Interactive map
- Location: Southeast of Gros Cap on US 2
- Nearest city: Gros Cap, Michigan
- Coordinates: 45°52′13″N 84°47′57″W
- Area: 5.5 acres (2.2 ha)
- Built: 1889
- NRHP reference No.: 71000406

Significant dates
- Added to NRHP: April 16, 1971
- Designated MSHS: November 6, 1970

The Gros Cap Cemetery, once known as the Western Cemetery, is a cemetery located southeast of Gros Cap, Michigan on US 2. It is one of the oldest cemeteries in the United States to be continuously used, and a portion is contained in the Gros Cap Archaeological District. It was designated a Michigan State Historic Site in 1970 and listed on the National Register of Historic Places in 1971.

== History ==
In the late 17th century, a group of Ottawa Indians settled in the area around West Moran Bay. The village had, at one time, 1500 people living in it.

The Gros Cap Cemetery was originally adjacent to the tribal village and was used as their burial ground. As more European settlers moved into the area, the Ottawa population decreased due to further emigration or intermarriage with the arriving settlers. However, the cemetery continued to be used by French, English, and eventually American settlers. In 1889, the cemetery was placed under the jurisdiction of Moran Township, at which time the size of the cemetery was reduced and some of the remains reburied within the smaller remaining area. Later, the cemetery was increased in size to the north and east.

== Description ==
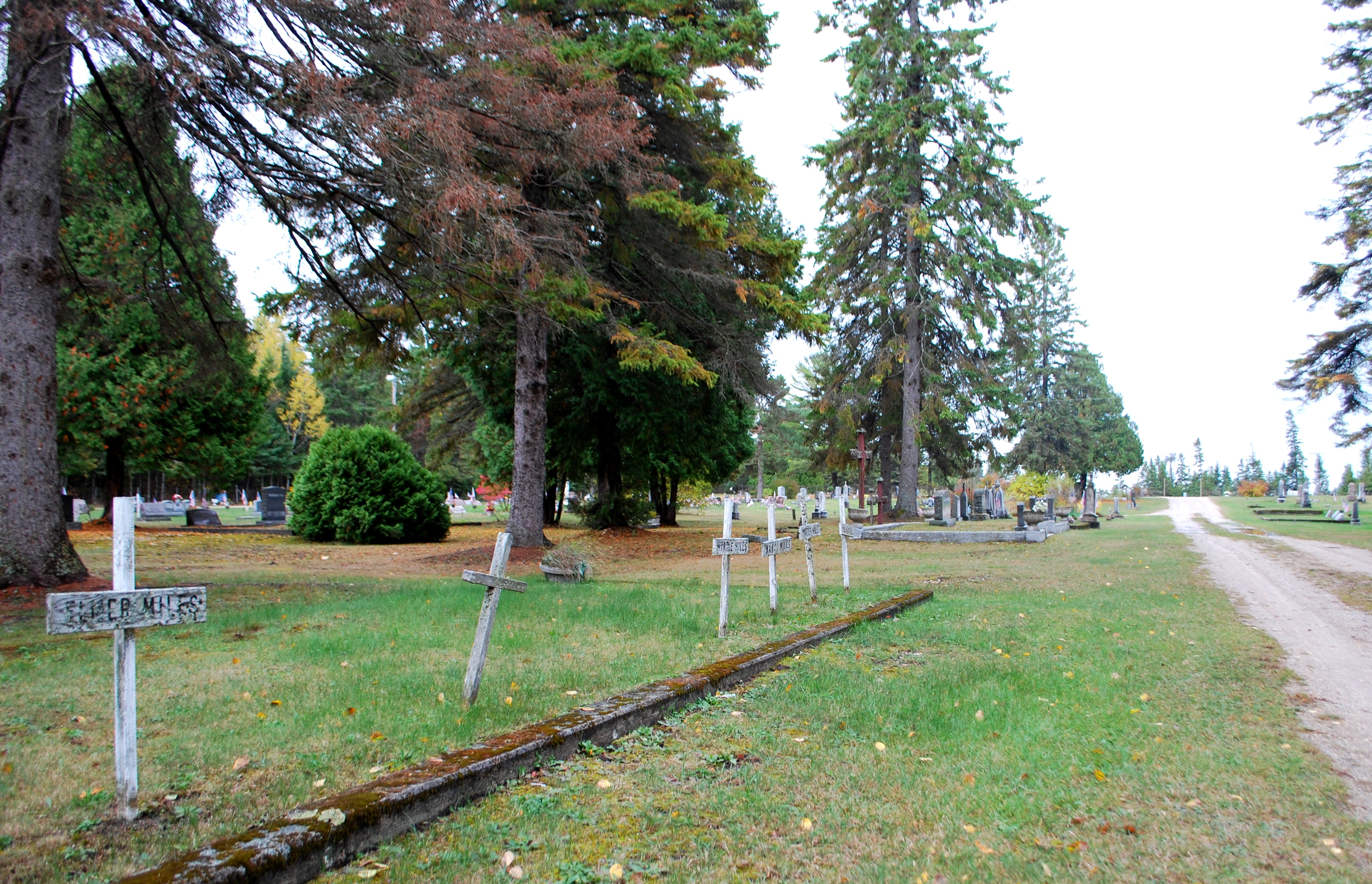

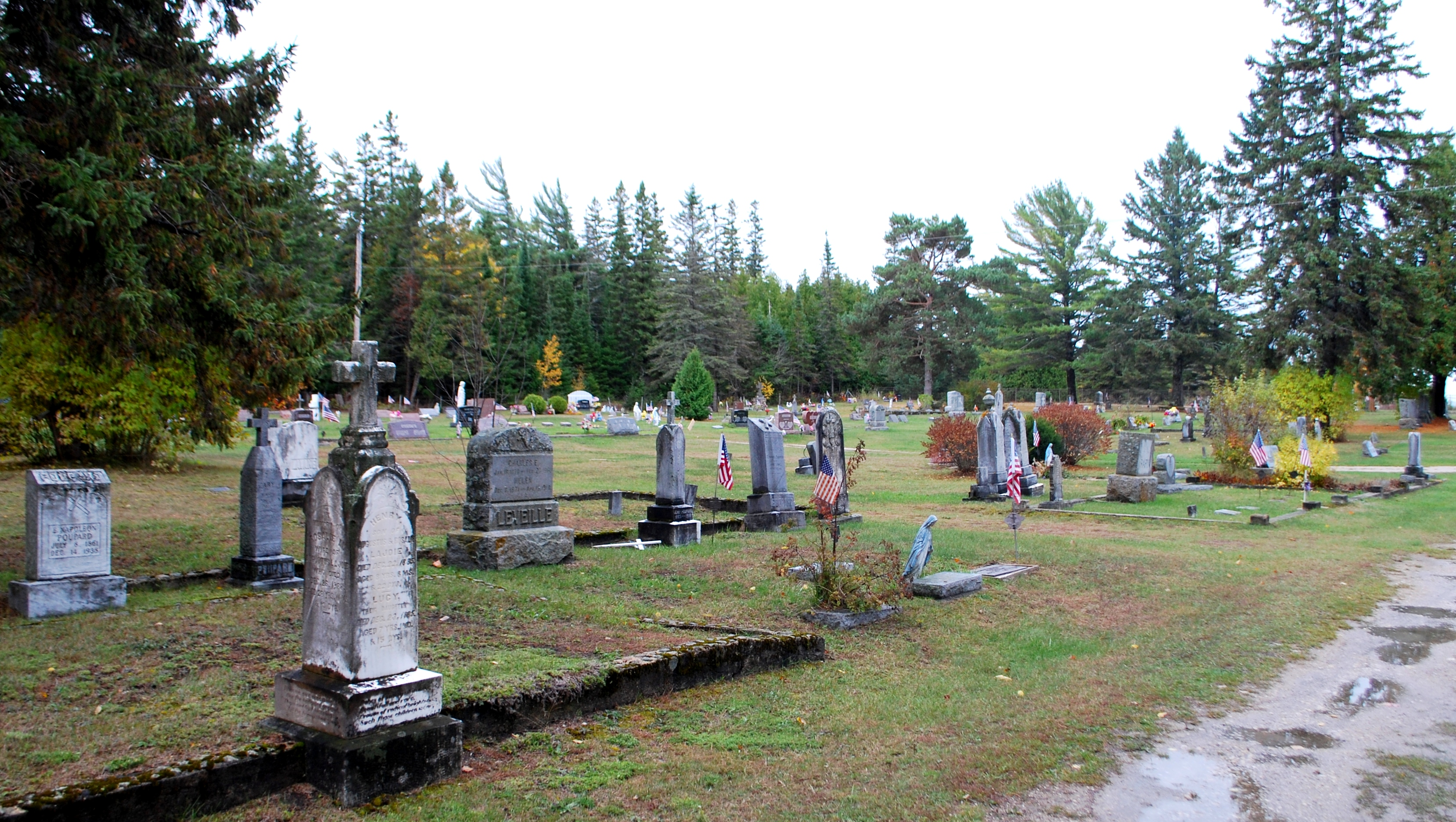

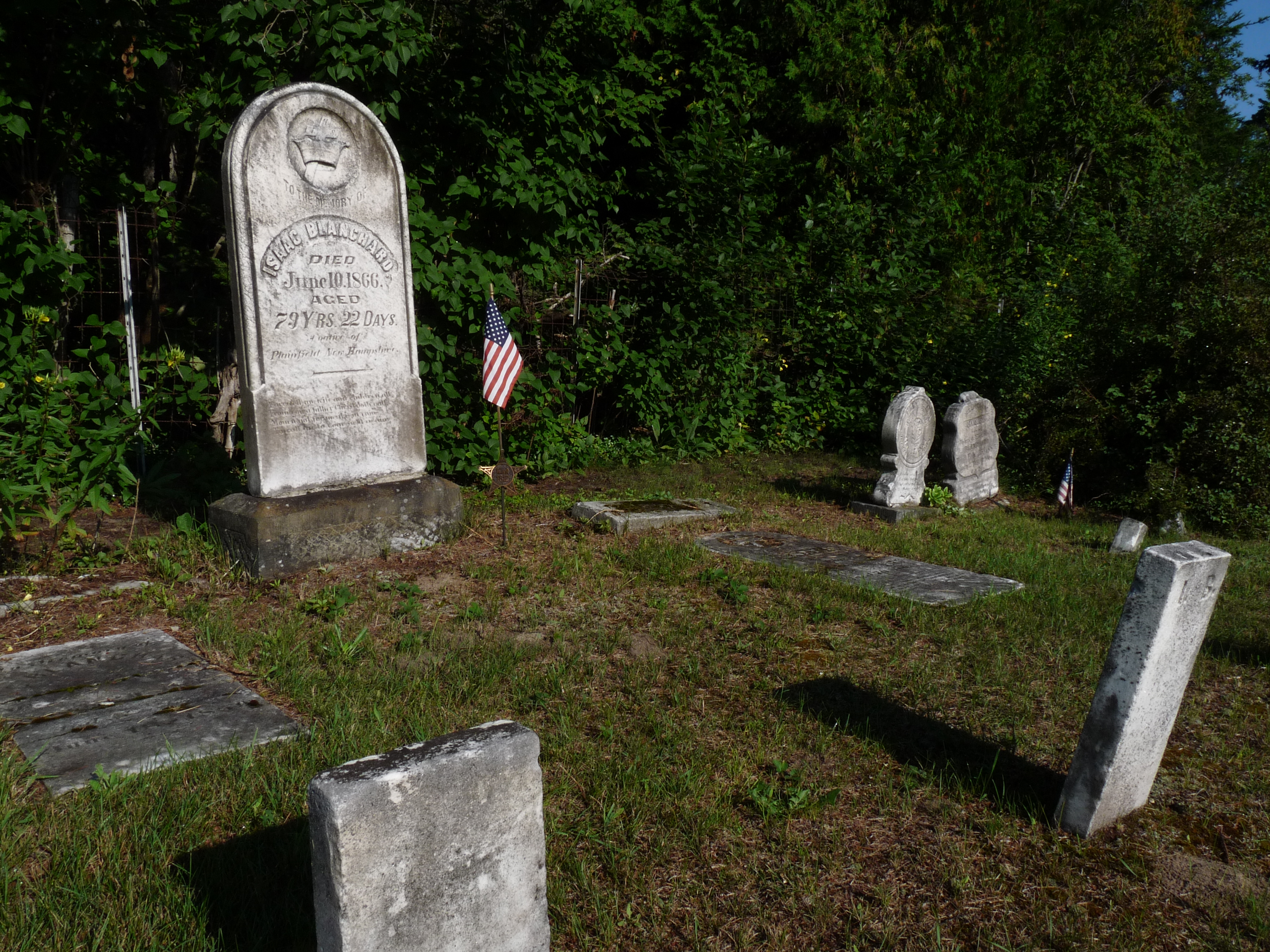

The original cemetery covered a wide area; however, the current Gros Cap Cemetery is a plot of land measuring 375 by 600 feet (114 by 183 m), surrounded by a chain link fence. The cemetery contains the graves of both Indians and Europeans, with wooden crosses, 19th century headstones, and modern tombstones.
