= Mackinac Trail–Carp River Bridge =

- U.S. National Register of Historic Places
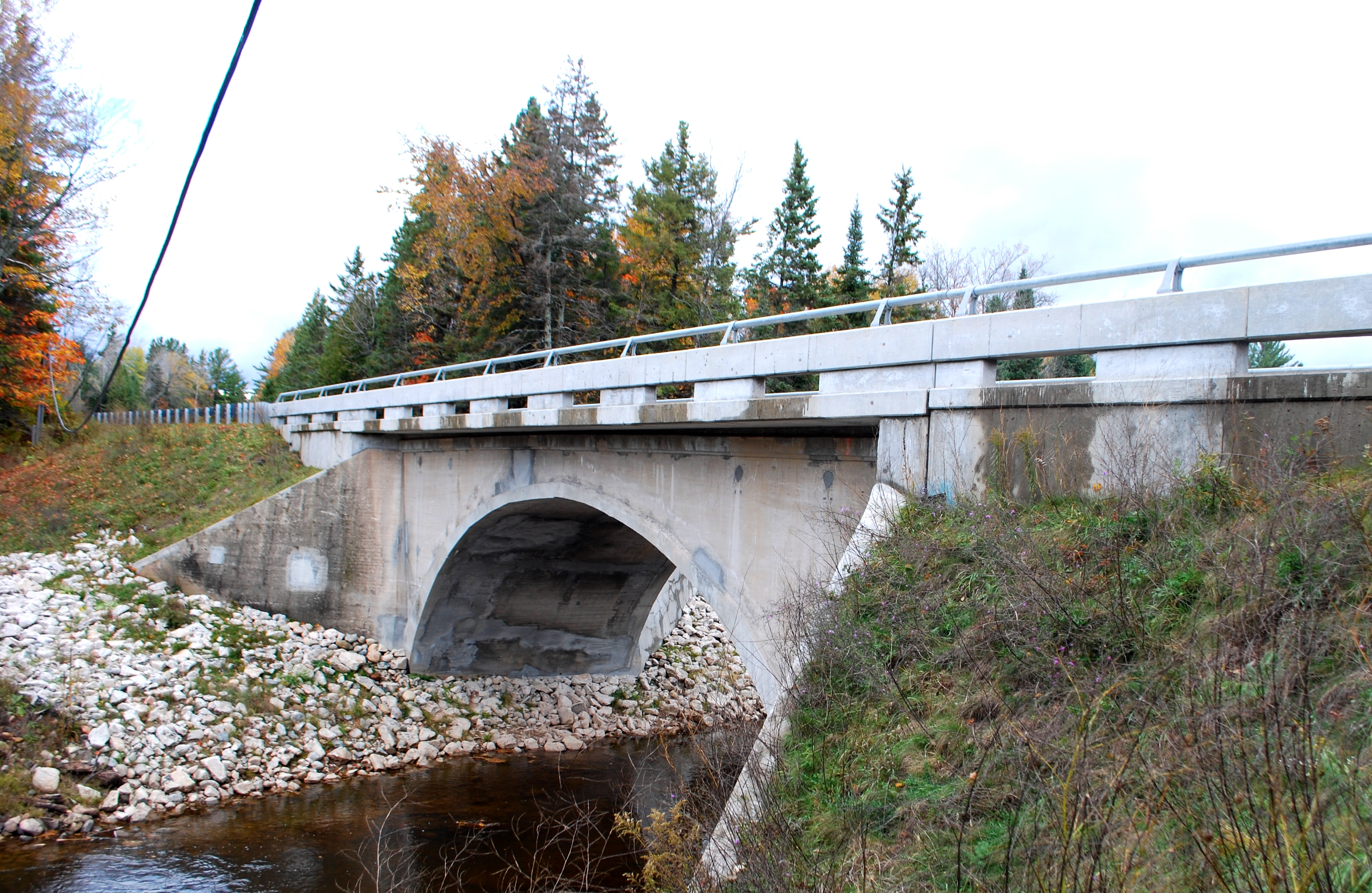
- Bridge arch, 2012

- Location within Michigan Location within the United States
- Interactive map
- Location: Mackinac Trail over Carp R., St. Ignace Township, Michigan
- Coordinates: 46°1′6″N 84°43′6″W
- Area: less than one acre
- Built: 1920
- Built by: A. S. Decker
- Architect: Michigan State Highway Department
- Architectural style: spandrel arch
- MPS: Highway Bridges of Michigan MPS
- NRHP reference No.: 99001528
- Added to NRHP: December 17, 1999

The Mackinac Trail–Carp River Bridge is a bridge located on H-63 (Mackinac Trail) over the Carp River in St. Ignace Township, Michigan. It is the oldest bridge in Mackinac County, and was listed on the National Register of Historic Places in 1999.

== History ==
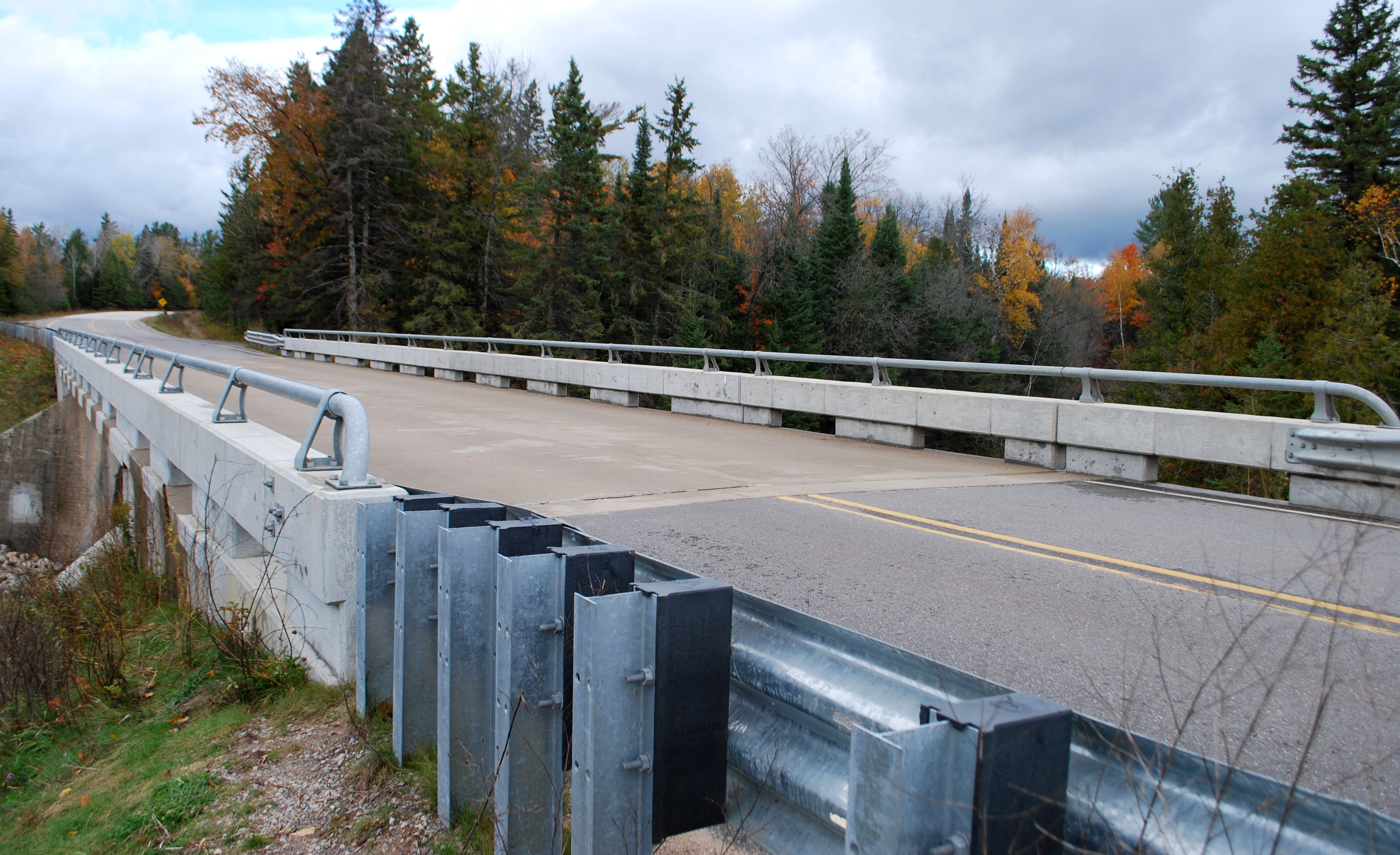
Bridge deck, 2012

In 1913, road improvement began on the Mackinac Trail a state trunkline highway connecting St. Ignace and Sault Ste. Marie. The improvement project included both grading the road surface and upgrading the bridges along the roadway. For one of these bridges, which carried the Mackinac Trail over the Carp River, the Michigan State Highway Department designed a 60-foot (18 m) concrete arch bridge in 1919. The department awarded the contract to construct the bridge to A. S. Decker of Flint, Michigan, who completed work on the bridge in 1920.

This section of the Mackinac Trail was later incorporated into U.S. Highway 2 (US 2) increasing the traffic flow across the bridge. In response, in 1929–30, new guardrails were added to the bridge, the deck was widened by five feet (1.5 m), and new approaches of decorative cobblestone were constructed. The section of US 2 was later replaced by Interstate 75, and the Mackinac Trail was redesignated as a county road, later numbered H-63.

In 2009, the bridge was considered for demolition. However, it was decided in 2010 to refurbish the bridge instead. Weakened concrete was replaced, drains installed, and the roadway was widened by another five feet (1.5 m). The Mackinac Trail–Carp River Bridge still carries local traffic.

== Description ==
The Mackinac Trail–Carp River Bridge is an arch bridge, 60 feet (18 m) in length, with a roadway width of 27 feet (8.2 m). The arch sits on large concrete abutments with angled wingwalls. The roadway approaches are flanked with cobblestone retaining walls. The original guardrail was removed during the 1929–30 road widening and replaced with ornamental steel rails with concrete bulkheads. This rail design, although called a "standard" design, appears to be unique among surviving bridges in Michigan. The Mackinac Trail–Carp River Bridge is one of the few remaining arch bridges constructed by the Michigan State Highway Department during its early period of design and construction.

== See also ==
- List of bridges on the National Register of Historic Places in Michigan
- National Register of Historic Places listings in Mackinac County, Michigan
