= Edward Fenlon =

American politician

Edward "Ned" Fenlon (October 7, 1903 – September 19, 2010) was an American politician who served as a Member of the Michigan State House of Representatives, as well as a circuit judge in Michigan. He was a member of the Michigan Democratic Party.

== Background ==
Fenlon was born in St. Ignace Township but was raised in nearby Hessel, Michigan. Married in 1939, he and his wife, Jane W. Fenlon, had one child, two granddaughters, and six great-grandchildren. His wife Jane died in 2001 at age of 87.

== Education ==
Fenlon attended Grand Rapids Community College (1923–1925), then attended Notre Dame University for his undergraduate degree. Fenlon also attended Saint Louis University School of Law in 1928, then getting his law degree from La Salle University.

== Politics and judgeship ==
Fenlon returned to Michigan after completing his education. He ran for Michigan State Legislature and won in 1933. He continued to hold the office till 1938. During his term he introduced several bills that laid the groundwork for the building of the Mackinac Bridge. He became a Michigan circuit judge in 1951 and continued in that office till leaving the bench in 1974. He was instrumental in getting several civic projects off the ground for Northern Michigan, including the Blue Water Bridge and Sault Ste. Marie International Bridge. He also helped in the building of several Michigan State Police posts.

== Retirement ==
At 106, Fenlon had a home in Petoskey, Michigan and a winter home in California.
