= Mackinac Wilderness =

Designated area within the Hiawatha National Forest in Mackinac County, Michigan

- IUCN category Ib (wilderness area)
- Location within the United States
- Location: Mackinac County, Michigan, USA
- Nearest city: Moran, Michigan
- Coordinates: 46°03′52″N 84°50′28″W
- Area: 12,230 acres (49.5 km^{2})
- Governing body: U.S. Forest Service & Ojibwa tribe of Native Americans

The Mackinac Wilderness is a 12,230-acre (49.5 km^{2}) unit within the Hiawatha National Forest. It is located in Mackinac County, Michigan. The wilderness is accessible from M-123, which borders the unit. The nearest town is Moran, Michigan.

== Description ==
Like the rest of the Hiawatha Forest, the Mackinac Wilderness was logged starting about 1880 and ending about 1910. The typical method of logging was to clear-cut all marketable timber and leave the discarded slashings on the forest floor. A severe forest fire was almost inevitable, followed by severe erosion and the creation of a second-growth forest that differed from the previous old-growth forest in many ways.

Today, the Mackinac Wilderness is a roadless unit within the managed Hiawatha Forest. Much of the wilderness consists of wetlands alongside the Carp River, a natural trout stream listed as a National Wild and Scenic River, and the unit's wilderness designation helps protect part of the river's drainage. The wilderness is also a template of natural succession that contrasts with most of the Hiawatha National Forest, which continues to be managed for harvestable pulpwood.

The unit's terrain is dominated by postglacial moraines and sand dunes left behind by the Wisconsin glaciation and modified by the stormy climate that accompanied the glacial meltoff. Many of the sandy ridges and mounds are separated by creeks and ribbon-shaped wetlands, and some of the highlands are laced together by beaver dams. Beaver ponds are key features of the wilderness.

Two tree families found in large numbers within the Mackinac Wilderness are aspen and birch, both typical of second-growth forests in the Upper Peninsula of Michigan. In wet areas near the Carp River, the Northern whitecedar is found, although this tree is severely impacted by browsing by whitetail deer.

Birds such as the great blue heron, the osprey, and the sandhill crane nest in the wilderness.

The Mackinac Wilderness had no footpaths as of 2006, and public visitation to the wilderness was centered on the roadside strip adjacent to M-123, and on the Carp River and its banks. As of 2006, the Mackinac Wilderness was managed jointly by the U.S. Forest Service and the Ojibwa tribe of Native Americans.

Like Mackinac Island, the Mackinac Wilderness is pronounced Mack-in-aw, and is often misspelled accordingly. Members of the Ojibwa nation living in the eastern Upper Peninsula often call themselves Chippewa.
