= Brevort Township, Michigan =

- Civil township
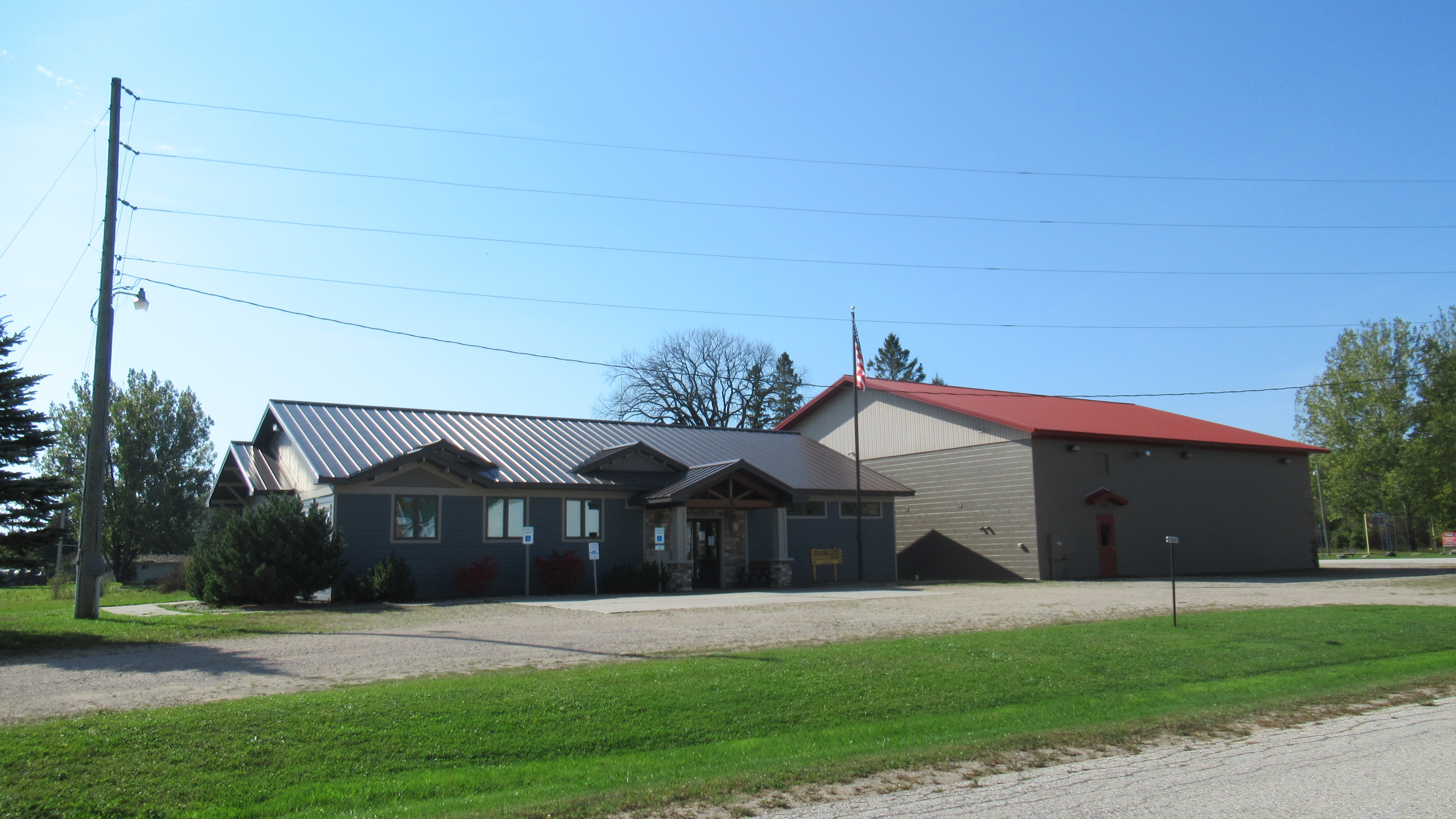
- Brevort Township Community Center

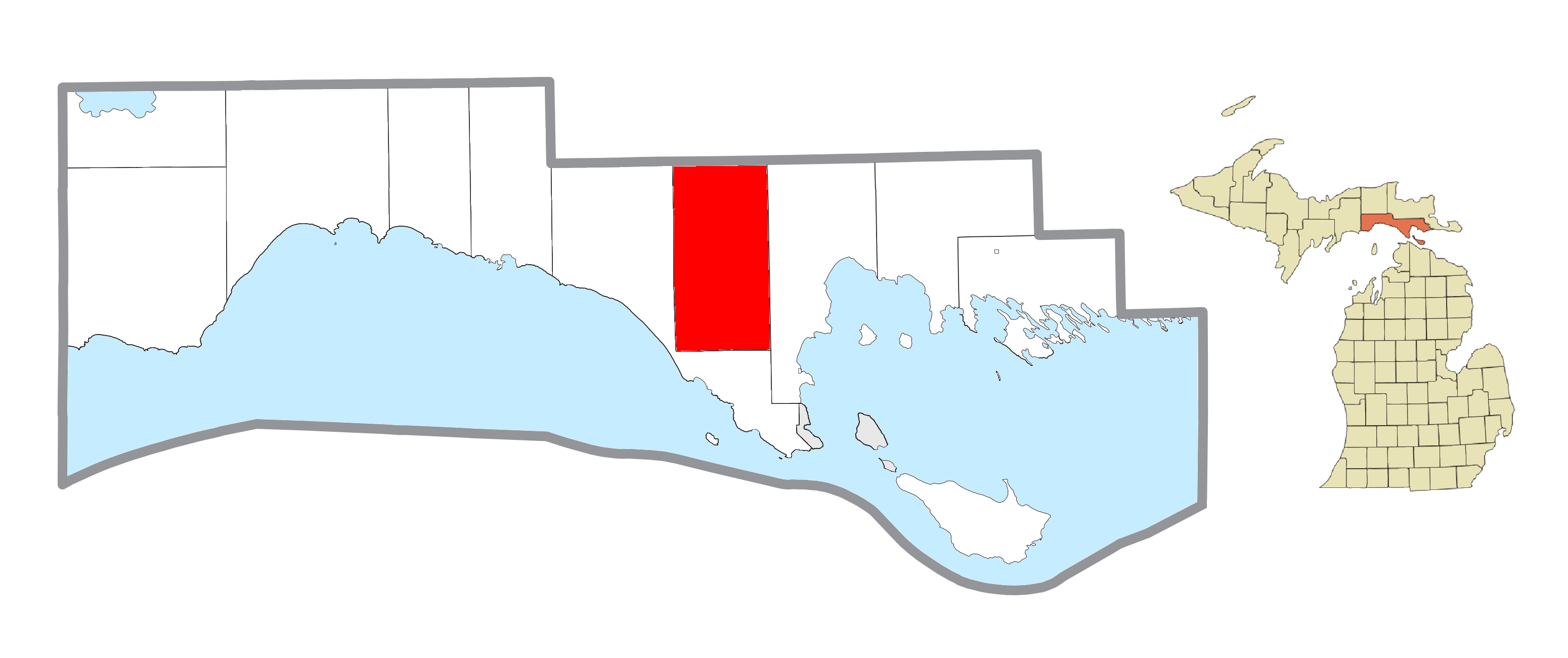
- Location within Mackinac County

- Location within the state of Michigan Location within the United States
- Coordinates: 46°02′46″N 84°50′35″W
- Country: United States
- State: Michigan
- County: Mackinac
- Established: 1881

Government
  - Supervisor: Ed Serwach
  - Clerk: Kaye Matelski

Area
  - Total: 98.84 sq mi (255.99 km^{2})
  - Land: 92.48 sq mi (239.52 km^{2})
  - Water: 6.36 sq mi (16.47 km^{2})
- Elevation: 686 ft (209 m)

Population (2020)
  - Total: 502
  - Density: 6.42/sq mi (2.48/km^{2})
- Time zone: UTC-5 (Eastern (EST))
  - Summer (DST): UTC-4 (EDT)
- ZIP Codes: 49760 (Moran); 49780 (Rudyard)
- Area code: 906
- FIPS code: 26-097-10360
- GNIS feature ID: 1625975
- Website: www.brevorttownship.com

Brevort Township (/brɛˈvɔːrt/ breh-VORT) is a civil township of Mackinac County in the U.S. state of Michigan. As of the 2020 census, the population was 502, down from 594 in 2010.

The township was named after Henry Brevort (or Brevoort), a surveyor assigned to subdivide the area in 1845. Most of the township land is within the eastern portion of the Hiawatha National Forest. The township includes part of the Mackinac Wilderness.

== Geography ==
The township is in central Mackinac County, bordered to the west and south by Moran Township and to the east by St. Ignace Township. It is bordered to the north by Trout Lake Township in Chippewa County. According to the U.S. Census Bureau, Brevort Township has a total area of 98.84 square miles (255.99 km^{2}), of which 92.48 square miles (239.52 km^{2}) are land and 6.36 square miles (16.47 km^{2}) (6.43%) are water.

Highway M-123 passes diagonally southeast–northwest through the township, and U.S. Route 2 and Interstate 75 are just outside of the township boundaries to the south and east.

=== Communities ===
- Allenville was a station on the Detroit, Mackinac and Marquette Railroad less than one mile southeast of Moran at 45°59′05″N 84°49′14″W. It was founded by J. Alley, head of the Alley Lumber Company in 1873. A post office operated from December 1873 until October 1891. Also known as "Alley Town", the community was almost destroyed by fire in 1882.
- Moran is an unincorporated community on M-123 at 45°59′39″N 84°49′51″W approximately 13 miles (21 km) northwest of St. Ignace. Confusingly, the community is not a part of Moran Township, which is adjacent to Brevort Township on the south and west. It was initially called "Jacob City", after the president of the German Land Company of Detroit, which sold land to members in 1881–83. In 1883, Jacob was accused of fraud and ousted from the organization. Another member of the group, William B. Moran, loaned the group funds to buy additional land, and the settlement was renamed after him in 1883. A post office named "Jacob City" was established in February 1882 and renamed "Moran" in January 1883. The office was transferred to and renamed "Allenville" in April 1898, but a Moran post office was re-established in May 1910. The name of Moran Township and other nearby places named Moran such as East Moran Bay in St. Ignace, West Moran Bay on Lake Michigan, and the Moran River all have a different origin, and instead derive from the French Morin.

=== Climate ===
Climate data for Moran, Michigan (1991–2020)
Month	Jan	Feb	Mar	Apr	May	Jun	Jul	Aug	Sep	Oct	Nov	Dec	Year
Mean daily maximum °F (°C)	25.9 (−3.4)	28.2 (−2.1)	37.2 (2.9)	48.4 (9.1)	61.9 (16.6)	72.0 (22.2)	76.6 (24.8)	76.0 (24.4)	68.3 (20.2)	54.6 (12.6)	42.0 (5.6)	32.2 (0.1)	51.9 (11.1)
Daily mean °F (°C)	16.6 (−8.6)	17.6 (−8.0)	26.1 (−3.3)	38.2 (3.4)	50.5 (10.3)	60.3 (15.7)	65.4 (18.6)	64.7 (18.2)	57.3 (14.1)	45.1 (7.3)	34.5 (1.4)	24.3 (−4.3)	41.7 (5.4)
Mean daily minimum °F (°C)	7.2 (−13.8)	6.9 (−13.9)	15.1 (−9.4)	27.9 (−2.3)	39.0 (3.9)	48.5 (9.2)	54.1 (12.3)	53.5 (11.9)	46.3 (7.9)	35.6 (2.0)	27.0 (−2.8)	16.4 (−8.7)	31.5 (−0.3)
Average precipitation inches (mm)	2.19 (56)	1.58 (40)	2.01 (51)	3.14 (80)	2.55 (65)	2.85 (72)	3.20 (81)	3.29 (84)	3.92 (100)	4.25 (108)	3.38 (86)	2.62 (67)	34.98 (890)
Average snowfall inches (cm)	20.4 (52)	14.8 (38)	9.8 (25)	6.8 (17)	0.0 (0.0)	0.0 (0.0)	0.0 (0.0)	0.0 (0.0)	0.0 (0.0)	0.4 (1.0)	7.4 (19)	21.3 (54)	80.9 (206)
Source: NOAA
