= Moran River =

Coordinates: 45°52′06″N 84°47′59″W

Location
- Country: United States

Physical characteristics
- Source
  - location: Michigan

The Moran River is a 2.2-mile-long (3.5 km) river on the Upper Peninsula of Michigan in the United States. It begins at the outlet of Chain Lake just west of St. Ignace and flows west through Freschette Lake to Lake Michigan at West Moran Bay.

== See also ==
- List of rivers of Michigan
