= St. Ignace Township, Michigan =

- Civil township
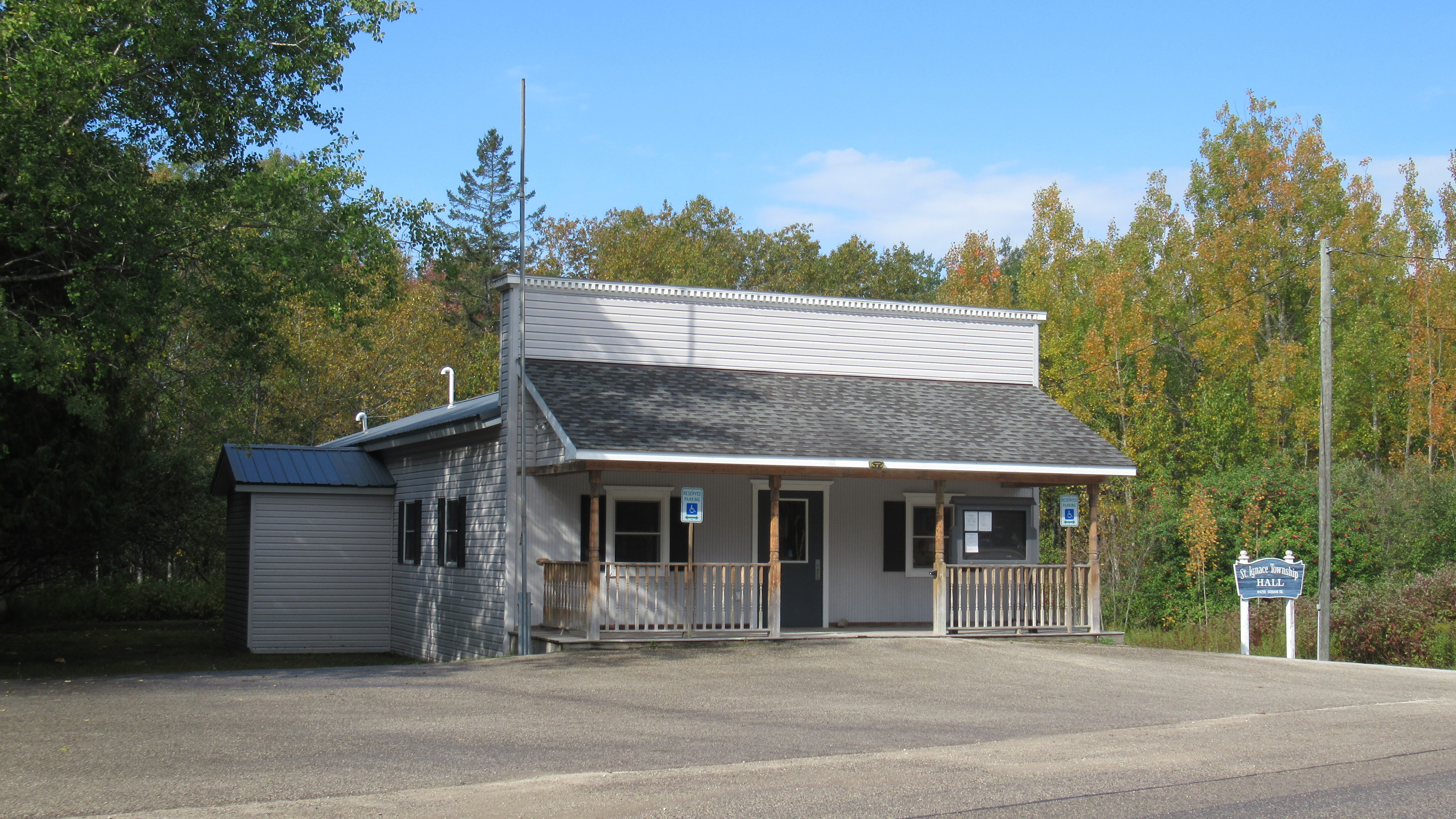
- St. Ignace Township Hall

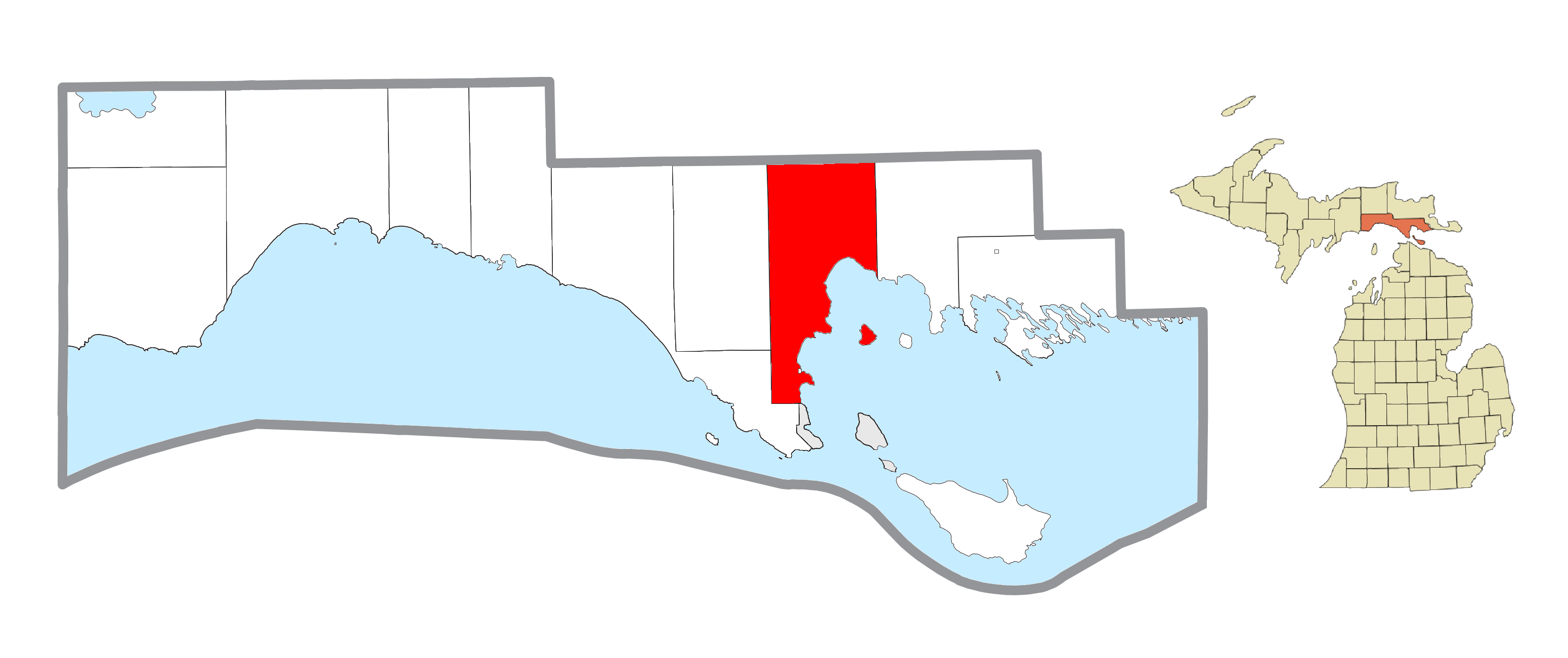
- Location within Mackinac County

- Location within the state of Michigan Location within the United States
- Coordinates: 45°59′33″N 84°42′11″W
- Country: United States
- State: Michigan
- County: Mackinac

Government
  - Supervisor: Eric Danielson
  - Clerk: Sheri Oja

Area
  - Total: 142.01 sq mi (367.8 km^{2})
  - Land: 97.29 sq mi (252.0 km^{2})
  - Water: 44.72 sq mi (115.8 km^{2})
- Elevation: 1,401 ft (427 m)

Population (2020)
  - Total: 973
  - Density: 10/sq mi (3.9/km^{2})
- Time zone: UTC-5 (Eastern (EST))
  - Summer (DST): UTC-4 (EDT)
- ZIP Codes: 49745 (Hessel); 49760 (Moran); 49780 (Rudyard); 49781 (St. Ignace)
- Area code: 906
- FIPS code: 26-097-70860
- GNIS feature ID: 1627028
- Website: stignacetownship.org

St. Ignace Township is a civil township of Mackinac County in the U.S. state of Michigan. As of the 2020 census, the township population was 973.

The city of St. Ignace borders the township on the south, but the two are administered autonomously.

== Geography ==
The township is located east of the geographic center of Mackinac County, extending from the Chippewa County line on the north to the city of St. Ignace at its southern border. The southeast portion of the township is within Lake Huron at its northwest end. Interstate 75 crosses the township from north to south, with access from three exits.

According to the U.S. Census Bureau, the township has a total area of 142.01 square miles (367.80 km^{2}), of which 97.29 square miles (251.98 km^{2}) are land and 44.72 square miles (115.82 km^{2}), or 31.49%, are water.

=== Communities ===
- Charles was a settlement around a mill of the Sterling Lumber Company. It had a post office beginning in 1905.
- Evergreen Shores is an unincorporated community in the township on Lake Huron approximately two miles north of St. Ignace at 45°54′03″N 84°44′11″W.

== Demographics ==
According to the 2020 census, its population was 973, up from 939 in 2010.

== Transportation ==
Interstate 75 passes through this township, with two exits in St. Ignace. Mackinac Trail, or H-63, passes through as well. The western terminus of M-134 and the southern terminus of M-123 are located here.

== Notable person ==
- Edward Fenlon, jurist and legislator
