= Duluth, South Shore and Atlantic Railway =

Railroad in Michigan and Wisconsin, US

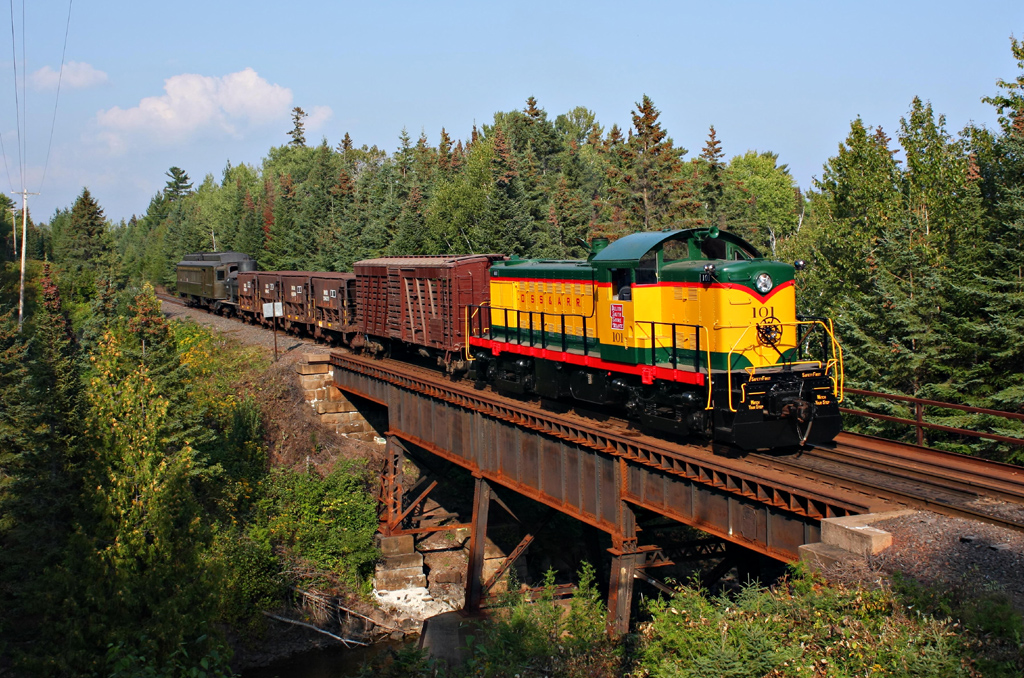
- A former Duluth, South Shore and Atlantic Railway RS-1 locomotive leads a photo charter for the Lake Superior Railroad Museum in 2009

Overview
- Headquarters: Marquette, Michigan
- Reporting mark: DSA
- Locale: Michigan, Wisconsin
- Dates of operation: 1855–1960
- Successor: Soo Line

Technical
- Track gauge: 4 ft 8 1/2 in (1,435 mm) standard gauge

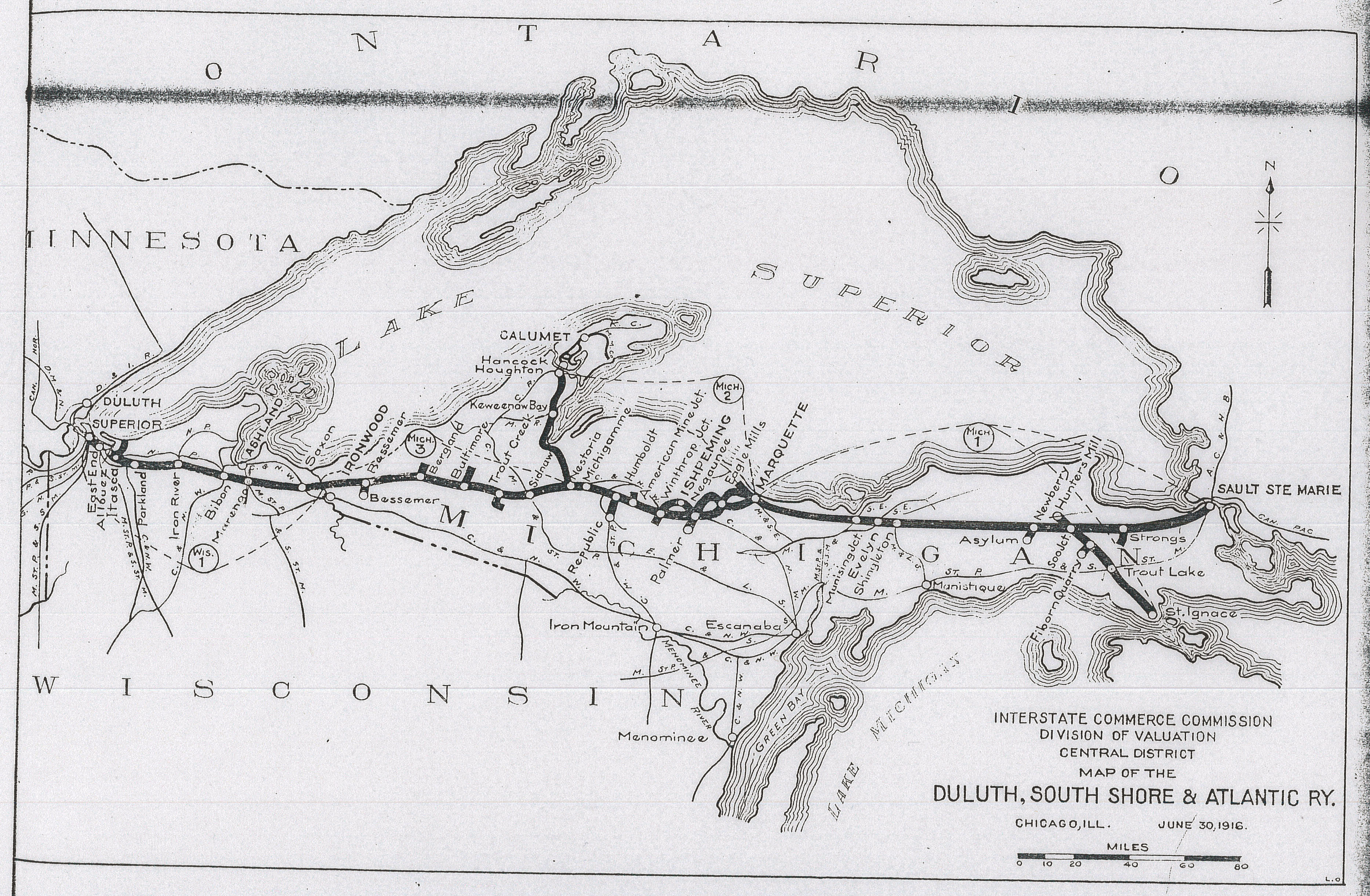
1916 map of the railroad

The Duluth, South Shore and Atlantic Railway (DSS&A; reporting mark DSA) was an American railroad serving the Upper Peninsula of Michigan and the Lake Superior shoreline of Wisconsin. It provided service from Sault Ste. Marie, Michigan, and St. Ignace, Michigan, westward through Marquette, Michigan, to Superior, Wisconsin, and Duluth, Minnesota. A branchline stretched northward from Nestoria, Michigan, up to the Keweenaw Peninsula and terminating at Houghton, Michigan, with two branches extending further to Calumet, Michigan, and Lake Linden, Michigan.

The first predecessor of the DSS&A began operations in 1855. The railroad fell under the control of the Canadian Pacific Railway (CPR) in 1888 and was operated from 1888 until 1960 as an independently nameplated subsidiary of the CPR. In 1949, a reorganization of the DSS&A took place, creating new heralds and designating the company a railroad instead of a railway. In 1961, the DSS&A was folded into the CPR-controlled Soo Line Railroad. Since 2001, the remaining operating trackage of the former DSS&A has been operated by the Canadian National Railway (CN). Short stretches of original DSS&A trackage are still operated between Trout Lake and Munising Junction, from Ishpeming to Baraga, and between White Pine and Marengo Junction.

== Independent railroad ==
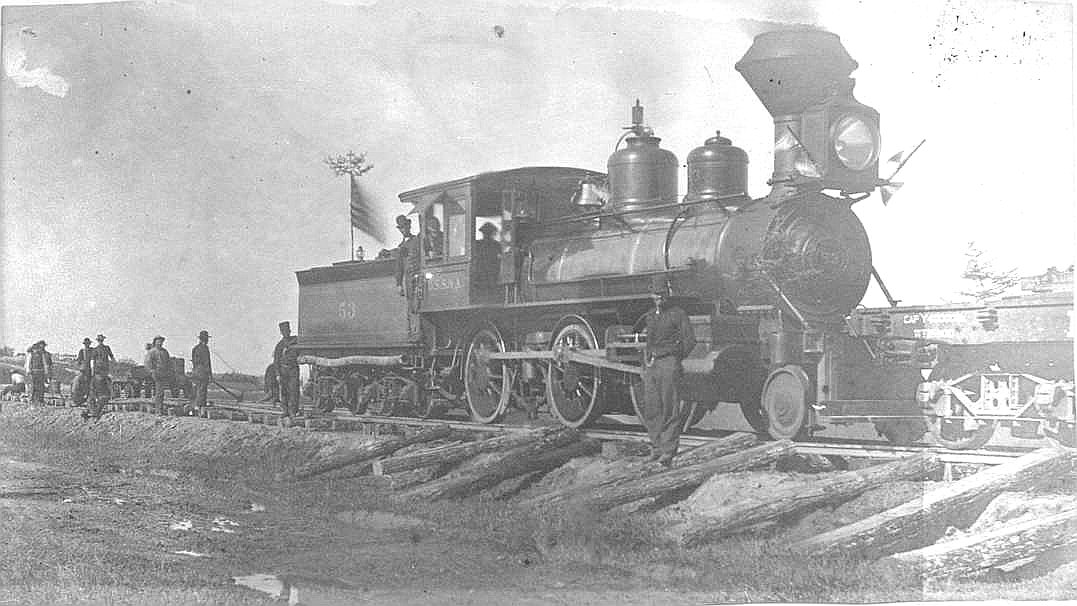
DSSA locomotive, circa 1887

The development in the 1850s of hematite iron ore mines in the Upper Peninsula hills above Marquette encouraged the development of numerous railroad plans for spur lines and connecting routes between mines, local boom towns, and the shores of the Great Lakes. While most of the Upper Peninsula's iron ore and Keweenaw copper was shipped to the rest of the United States by lake boat, the inability of water-based shippers to offer service to northern Michigan in winter encouraged railroad promoters to launch numerous plans for lines in the Upper Peninsula.

By the 1870s, a maze of corporate charters and tiny stub lines had been created or built in the central Upper Peninsula, primarily to carry iron or copper ore from the mines down to smelters and docks on the shores of Lake Superior and Lake Michigan. In 1879-81, venture capitalists led the construction of the Detroit, Mackinac and Marquette Railroad (DM&M), a standard-gauge mainline from St. Ignace, on the Straits of Mackinac, to Marquette on Lake Superior. The roadbed included a surveyor-straight 25-mile (40 km) east-west section, the ancestor of today's "Seney stretch". Although the state of Michigan granted the DM&M more than 1.3 million acres (5,300 km^{2}) of state land, almost 9000 acres-per-mile (23 km^{2}/km) as a construction subsidy, by 1886 the new DM&M went into receivership.

The DM&M was reorganized by venture capitalist James McMillan of Detroit, who led the rapid consolidation of the DM&M and many of the UP's smaller railroads during the early 1880s. The new Duluth, South Shore & Atlantic went into operation as a merger of these lines in December 1886.

== Canadian control ==
The Canadian Pacific Railway (CPR), a transcontinental line, took control of the Duluth, South Shore & Atlantic in 1888. In 1892-94, CPR funds financed the construction of the DSS&A westward from the Keweenaw Peninsula to Duluth.

During the 1890s, the timber industry reached the peak of its operations on the Lake Superior shoreline properties adjacent to the DSS&A's new mainline, shipping old-growth white pine. After white pines were exhausted, local cutters began to turn to high-quality hardwoods such as sugar maple, and then to pulpwoods such as paper birch and aspen.

At the height of the railroad's operations in 1911, the DSS&A operated 623 miles (1,003 km) of track, of which 517 miles (832 km) were main line and 106 miles (171 km) were branch lines and trackage rights. The railroad operated 3,121 pieces of rolling stock, including 82 locomotives, 67 passenger cars, 35 cabooses, and 2,957 freight cars.

In 1913 the DSS&A's freight operations peaked at almost 1 million short tons (900,000 metric tons), of which more than half were forest products. In the late 1910s, timber yields began to decline all over the Upper Peninsula. This was a blow from which the DSS&A could not recover as an independent nameplate. Its story from 1920 onwards was that of the American railway industry as a whole, with negative factors intensified by unfavorable local business conditions in northern Michigan.

In 1957, the State of Michigan opened the Mackinac Bridge, a 5-mile (8.0 km) long suspension bridge carrying an all-weather hard road across the Straits of Mackinac into the Upper Peninsula. The DSS&A responded by ending its remaining passenger rail service in January 1958. In 1961, its Canadian owners merged it with the Minneapolis, St. Paul and Sault Ste. Marie, and the DSS&A became part of the Soo Line.

== Nicknames and challenges ==
The DSS&A's own "official" nickname for itself was "South Shore", referring to the railroad line's route along the south shore of Lake Superior.

However, the DSS&A's allegedly poor-quality service throughout much of the 20th century inspired angry customers to impose several uncomplimentary backronyms on the struggling railroad, such as "Dead Slow Service & Agony" and "Damn Slow, Shabby Affair". Dissatisfied workers, meanwhile, suggested that the railroad's initials stood for "Damn Small Salary & Abuse".

The DSS&A's thinly settled service area made it difficult for the railroad to raise adequate revenue to maintain its trackage in good condition, especially in winter. The region served by the railroad receives more snowfall in one year than other sections of the United States east of the Rockies receive in several years combined. From 1957 through 2005, the average snowfall on the Keweenaw Peninsula has been 241 inches (20.1 ft; 6.1 m) per year. Every winter, the DSS&A had to plow this snow off its tracks.

== Legacy ==
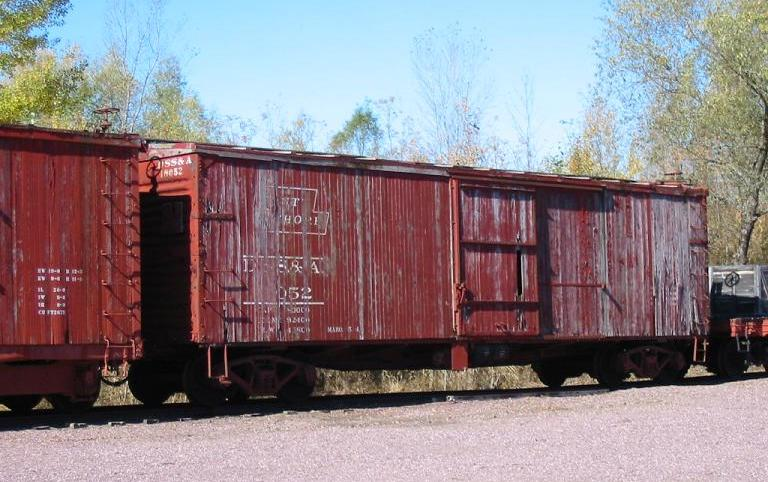
A preserved DSS&A boxcar at the Mid-Continent Railway Museum, North Freedom, Wisconsin

Parts of the former DSS&A alignment have been converted to rail trails. The St. Ignace–Trout Lake Trail preserves a 26-mile (42 km) section of roadbed from St. Ignace to Trout Lake.

== See also ==
- Upper Peninsula of Michigan
- Duluth, South Shore and Atlantic Negaunee Freight Depot
