= Moran Township, Michigan =

- Civil township
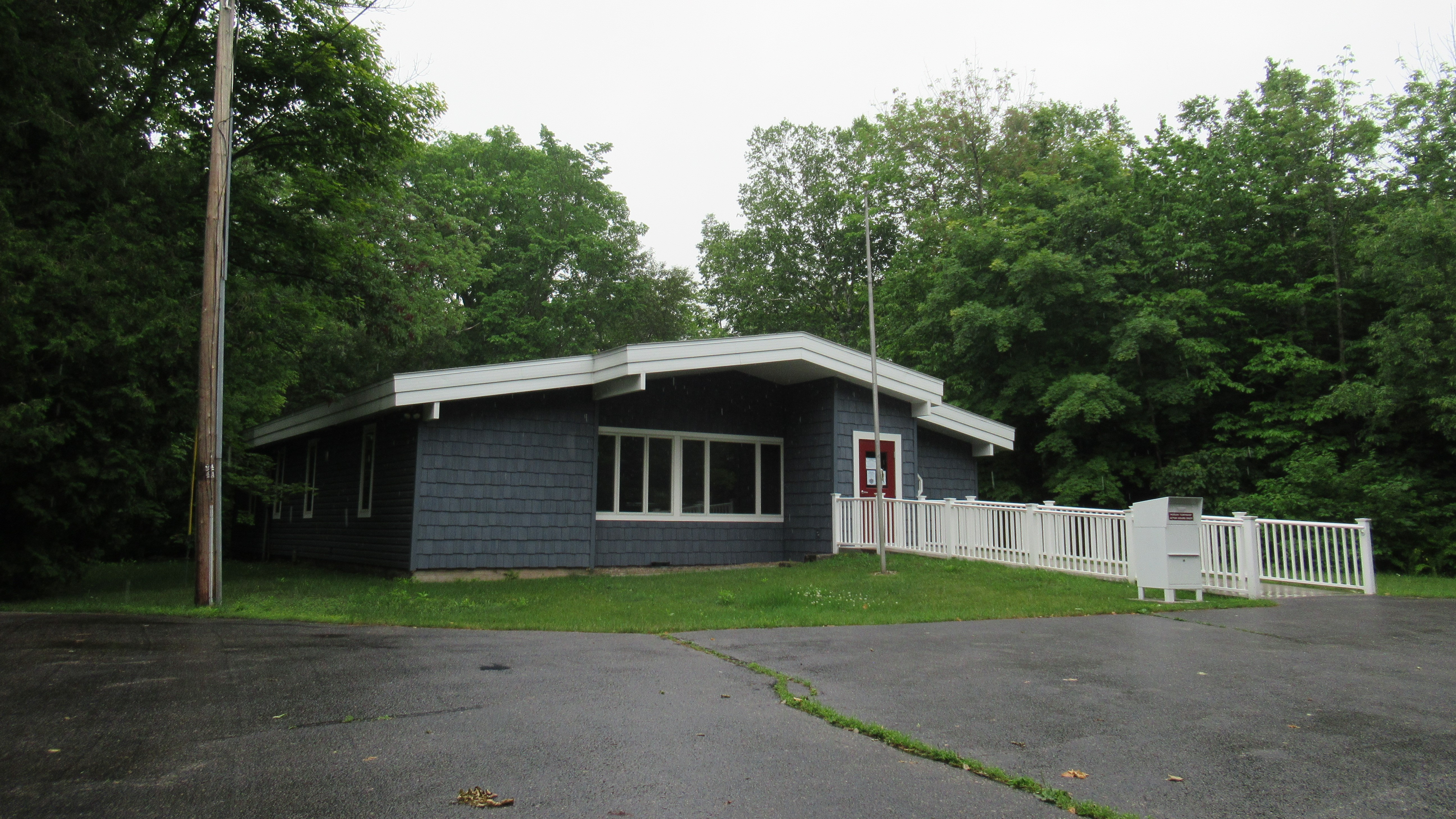
- Moran Township Office

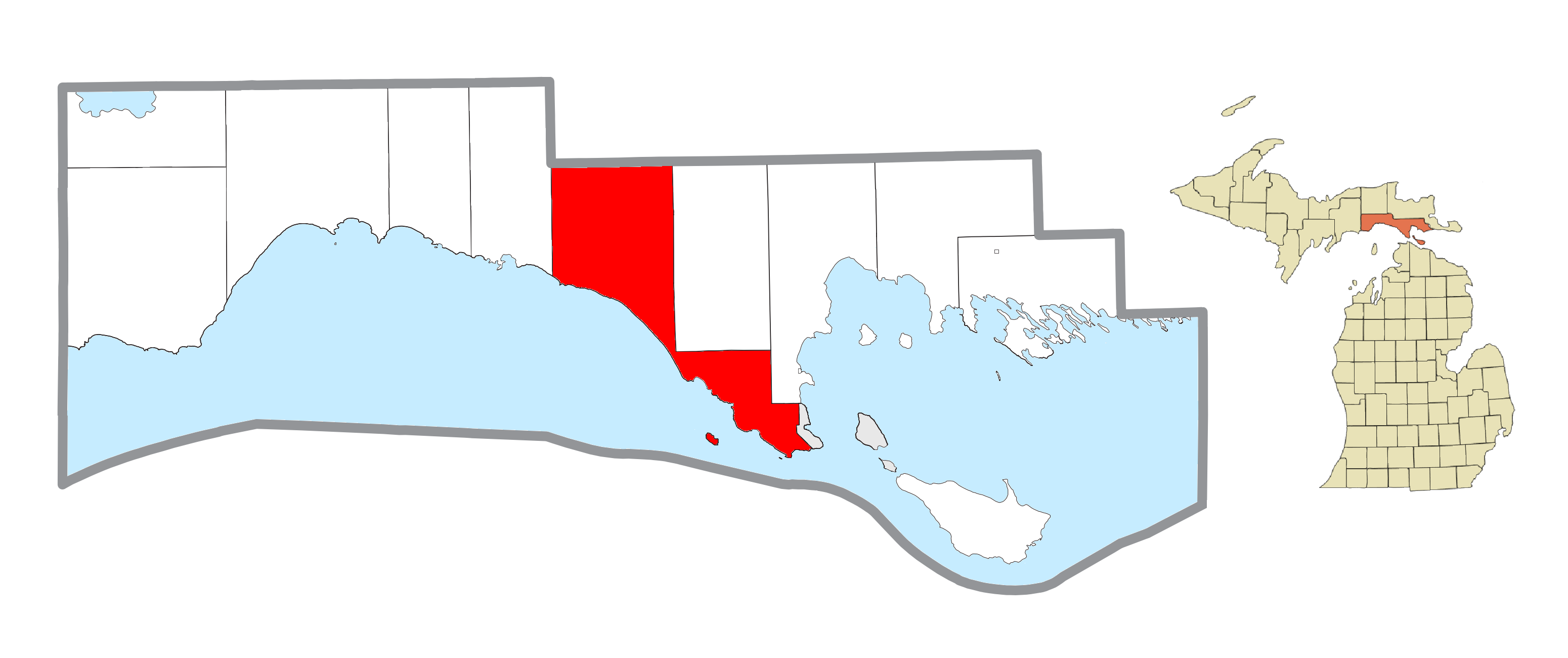
- Location within Mackinac County

- Location within the state of Michigan Location within the United States
- Coordinates: 45°58′41″N 84°55′33″W
- Country: United States
- State: Michigan
- County: Mackinac
- Established: 1844

Government
  - Supervisor: Susan Dionne
  - Clerk: Kristine Vallier

Area
  - Total: 134.42 sq mi (348.1 km^{2})
  - Land: 127.57 sq mi (330.4 km^{2})
  - Water: 6.85 sq mi (17.7 km^{2})
- Elevation: 646 ft (197 m)

Population (2020)
  - Total: 1,029
  - Density: 8.07/sq mi (3.12/km^{2})
- Time zone: UTC-5 (Eastern (EST))
  - Summer (DST): UTC-4 (EDT)
- ZIP Codes: 49760 (Moran); 49762 (Naubinway); 49781 (St. Ignace)
- Area code: 906
- FIPS code: 26-55480
- GNIS feature ID: 1626766
- Website: www.morantownship.com

Moran Township is a civil township of Mackinac County in the U.S. state of Michigan. The population was 1,029 at the 2020 census.

== Geography ==
The township is in central Mackinac County, along the northeast shore of Lake Michigan. The southeastern end of the township touches the Straits of Mackinac at the northeast end of the lake. The city of St. Ignace borders the township to the southeast.

According to the United States Census Bureau, the township has a total area of 134.42 square miles (348.15 km^{2}), of which 127.57 square miles (330.40 km^{2}) are land and 6.85 square miles (17.74 km^{2}), or 5.10%, are water.

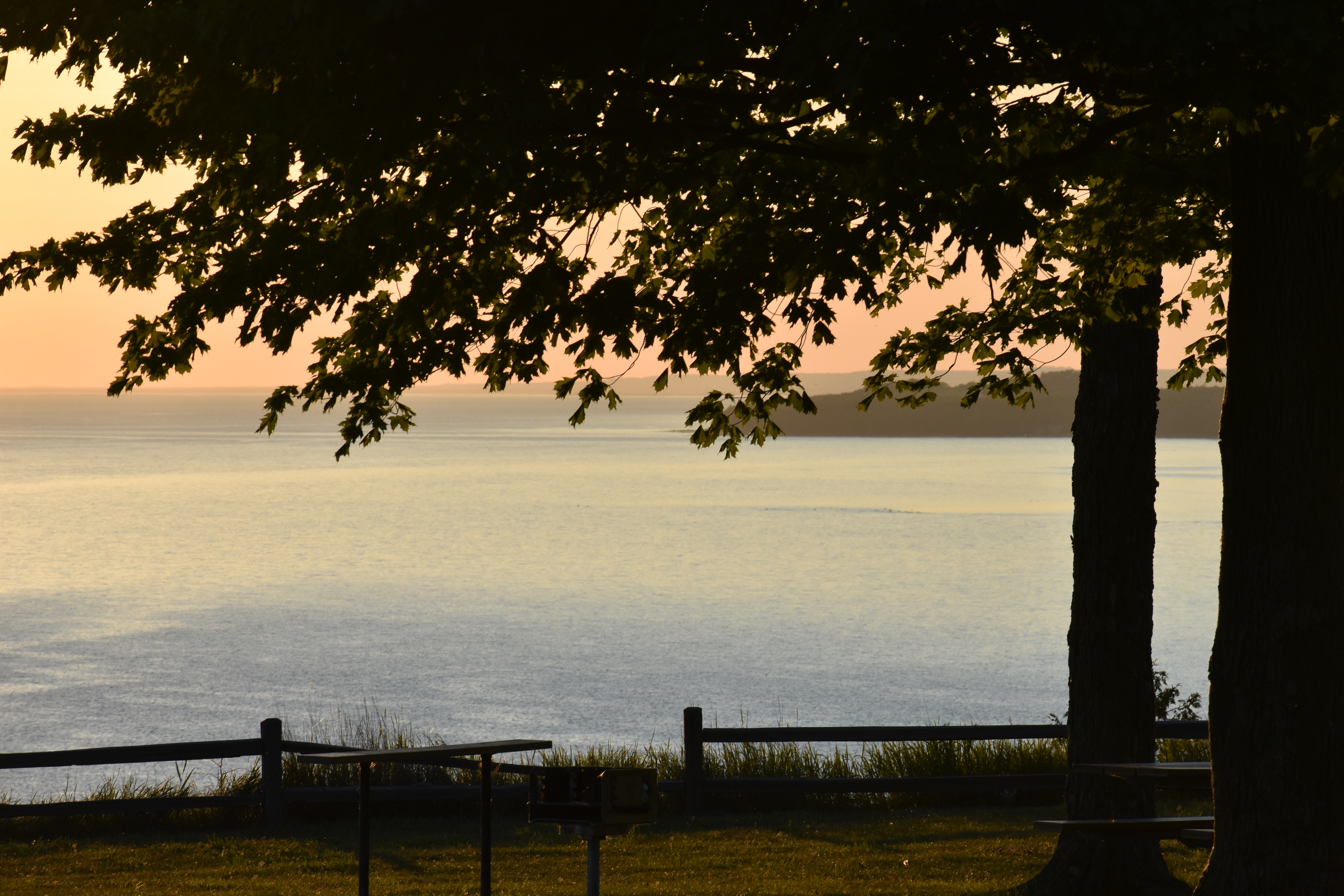
The coastline along Gros Cap, Michigan, in Moran Township, at sunset

=== Communities ===
- Brevort is an unincorporated community in the township on U.S. Highway 2 at 46°01′08″N 85°02′30″W, approximately 20 miles (32 km) northwest of St. Ignace. The community is not a part of Brevort Township, which is adjacent to Moran Township on the north and east.
- Gros Cap is an unincorporated community in the township on Lake Michigan, approximately five miles (8.0 km) west of St. Ignace at 45°52′13″N 84°49′40″W
- Ozark is a mostly unpopulated historic locale in the township at 46°08′31″N 84°57′56″W. It was the site for the charcoal kilns of the Martel Furnace Company and was a flag stop named "Johnson's" on the Duluth, South Shore and Atlantic Railway in 1882. A post office named Ozark operated from June 1884 until August 1966. The name was derived from the early French name for the place Aux Arc, meaning "at the bend."

=== Attractions ===
- Father Marquette National Memorial
- Fred Dye Nature Sanctuary
- Hiawatha National Forest (part)
- North Country Trail (segment)
- St. Helena Island

== Demographics ==
In 2020, the township population was 1,029.
